= Tamale Senior High School =

Coeducational boarding school in Tamale, Ghana

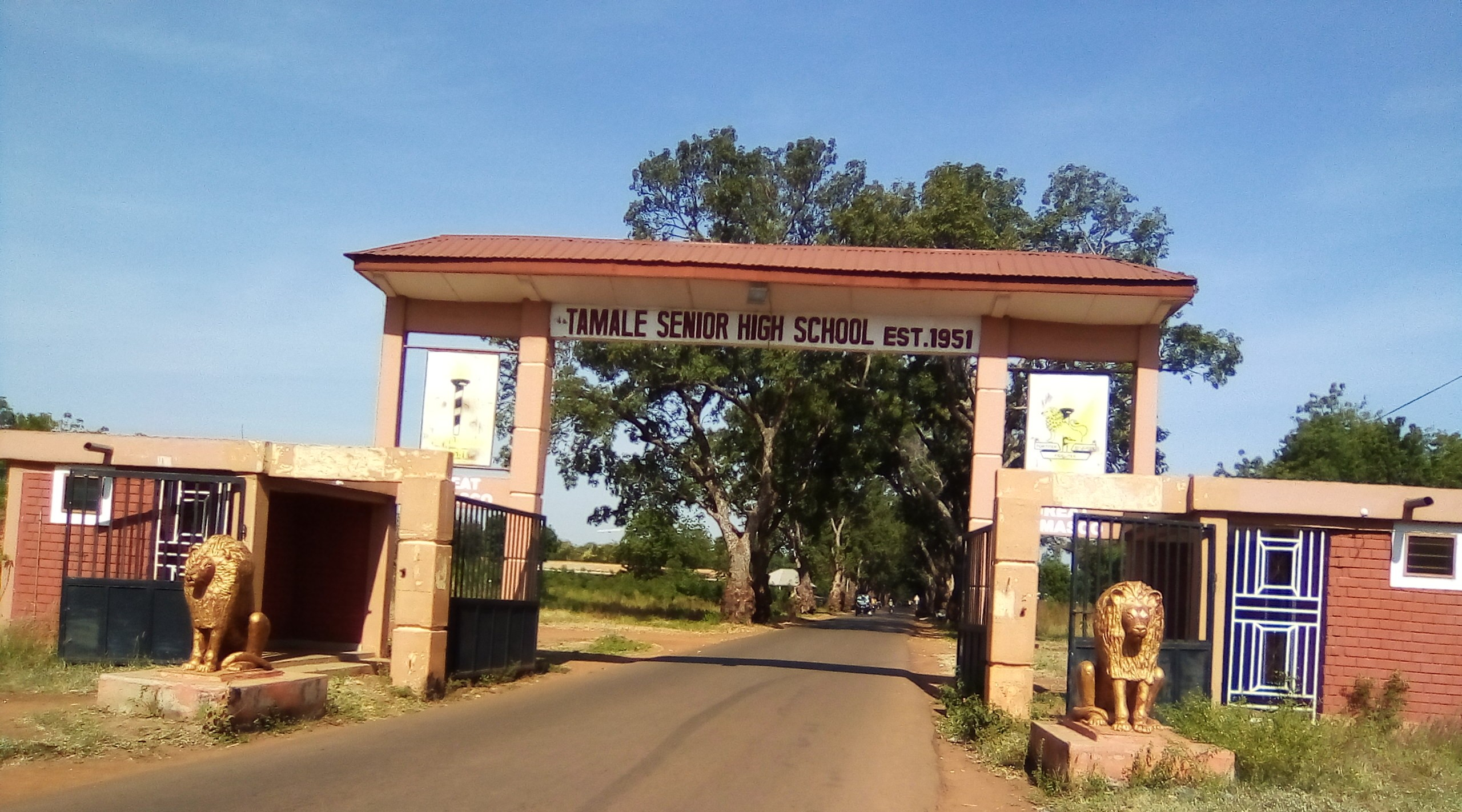
- High school south gate

Location
- P. O. Box 50 E.R Tamale; Education Ridge, Sagnarigu; Northern Region; Ghana

Information
- Former names: Gbewaa Secondary School; Government Secondary School, Tamale; Tamale Secondary School
- School type: Secondary co-educational boarding school
- Motto: Fortiter, Fideliter and Feliciter (Boldly, Faithfully, Successfully)
- Established: 1951; 75 years ago
- Status: Active
- School board: Board of Governors
- School district: Sagnarigu Municipal District
- Oversight: Ghana Education Service
- Grades: Forms 1–3 (Grades 10–12)
- Gender: Co-ed
- Age range: 14 to 18 years
- Education system: Senior High School
- Language: English
- Nickname: Tamasco
- Rivals: Ghana Senior High School (Tamale)

Tamale Senior High School, formerly Government Secondary School, Tamale, Gbewaa Secondary School, and more recently Tamale Secondary School is a co-educational second cycle boarding school located at Education Ridge, a suburb of the Sagnarigu Municipality. The school was founded in 1951 by the then British Colonial Authorities as the first second cycle institution of the Northern Territories.

The school is a selective school that grants admissions to students in Ghana based on their results in the Basic Education Certificate Examination, and for students outside Ghana, based on a special entrance examination prepared by the school. Courses offered by the school include; Business, General Science, Home Economics, Technical, General Arts, and Visual Arts.

Tamale senior high school is one of the prestigious senior high schools in Ghana and Northern region in particular. Hence the students refer to the school as the Northern light. Tamale Senior High School is the only senior high that has won the zonal championship twice in a role. Tamale Senior High School is the first and only senior high school in the Northern Region that has qualified for the Semi-final stage in the year 2021 in the National Science and Maths Quiz Competition.

Tamale Senior High School is considered amongst institutions of the highest prestige in Ghana, due to its longstanding history predating independent Ghana, and its prominent alumni. The school can count amongst its ranks; a head of State, two vice presidents of the fourth republic of Ghana, a speaker of parliament, two Justices of the Supreme Court of Ghana, two Chiefs of Defence Staff, and a host of government ministers and members of parliament.

== History ==
Tamale Senior High School was founded by then British Colonial Administration as Government Secondary School, Tamale in 1951. The school was developed from an already existing middle school called the Tamale Senior Boys School. The school then became the first secondary school in then Northern Territories under the then British Colonial Administration. The main objective of the establishment of the institution amongst others was to mitigate the widening gap of the human resource capacity between the North and the South of the then British Colony. The school throughout its existence has gone through various name changes. In 1972, the name of the school was changed to Gbewaa Secondary School. The name was later changed to Tamale Secondary School and now, Tamale Senior High School.

== Admissions ==
Tamale Senior High School was originally founded for students in the Northern territories but later opened to students in the south. As a selective school, admissions are based on the results of applicants in the Basic Education Certificate Examination (BECE). After the results are released, students gain admission through a computerized system that selects students who chose the school prior to writing their BECE based on their raw score. Due to this, students gain admission solely on merit. For students outside Ghana who want to attend the school, special entrance examinations are organized by the school to accept such students based on merit. After students who qualify are given admission, they are given an official prospectus which will help them know what is required of them as new students of the school. Prior to the introduction of common national entry examinations, students from the Northern territories were selected based on specially prepared examinations on English and Arithmetic. Students who passed were selected by a local selection board and awarded the scholarships. Also, following ongoing pressure and concerted efforts from the Northern Territories Council, both the Colonial Administration and later the Nkrumah Regime established the Special Northern Scholarship Scheme which enabled individuals from the Northern territories, who lacked secondary education but exhibited a strong desire and aptitude for higher studies, to gain admission to the school. These students were subsequently afforded the opportunity to pursue further education at the expense of the Central Government. Some of these students included John S. Nabila who later became Minister for Information and Tourism during the Limann regime.

== Student Population ==
In 1958, the school begun with twenty boys, but enrolled its first cohort of female students by 1958. But as of December 15, 2021, the population of students of Tamale Senior High School was 3,638 with 1,682 females and 1,956 males. which is almost three-fold higher than the previous enrollment figure. The school is gradually reaching a point where it will record 50 percent enrollment for both males and females due to the high demand for the school.

== Curriculum and halls of residence ==
Courses provided by the school at its inception were; English, Mathematics, Science, History, Latin, Geography, Citizenship, Hygiene and Physiology, Agriculture, Music, Arts and Crafts. The Crafts taught were Cloth Weaving, Book Binding, Leather Work and Pottery. Today, courses run by the school include; Business, General Science, Home Economics, Technical, General Arts, and Visual Arts. Students who apply for the school also choose the course they will want to offer prior to writing their BECE examination. The computerized system subsequently places students not only into the school but also into their preferred course.

There are eight halls of residence in the school and they are;

- Tamakloe House
- Gbewaa House
- Pattinson House
- Nkrumah House
- Hayfron House
- Wemah House
- Gbadamoshi House
- Bawumia House

== Awards and recognition ==
=== NSMQ records ===
- 2021: Qualified to Semi-final stage of the Ghana National Science and Maths Quiz competition for the first time, after beating Adisadel College and Kumasi Academy, with the scores; Tamale Senior High 59, Adisadel College 44 and Kumasi Academy 30.
- 2024: Qualified once again to the Semi-final stage of the Ghana National Science and Maths Quiz competition after beating St John's School and Accra Academy. They face Koforidua Senior High School and Keta Senior High School (KETASCO) at the Semifinals of the competition where they fell shot with 24pts placing 3rd at the end of the contest.
- 2025: Tamale Senior High School won the Northern Zonal Championship after beating Ghana Senior High School (GHANASCO) and Tamale Islamic Science SHS in the final.

== Alumni ==
A number of distinguished citizens who have served the world in a variety of positions have been created by the school over the years. Political notables include the President of the 3rd Republic of Ghana, Dr Hilla Limann, the late Former Vice President, Alhaji Aliu Mahama, Vice President Dr. Mahamudu Bawumia, current Speaker of the House of Representatives, Alban Sumani Bagbin, and Dr. Mohammed Ibn Chambas. Alumni of Tamale Senior High School are those old students who have excelled in their various fields of endeavor. Alumni of the school have played prominent roles in government and public service. Some of these old students are listed below;

=== Government and politics. ===
- Hilla Limann, President of Ghana (1979–1981)
- Aliu Mahama, vice-president of Ghana (2001–2008)
- Mahamudu Bawumia, vice-president of Ghana (2016–)
- Alban Bagbin, Minister for Water Resources, Works and Housing (2010–2012), Minister for Health (2012–2013), Speaker of parliament (2021–)
- Mohammed Ibn Chambas, President of the Economic Community of West African States (ECOWAS) (2006–2009)
- Malik Al-Hassan Yakubu, Minister for Interior (2001–2002)
- Muhammad Mumuni, Minister for Foreign Affairs (2009–2013)
- Ibrahim Mahama, Minister for Information (1968–1969)
- Mahama Iddrisu, Minister for Transport and Communications (1983–1987), Minister for Defence (1987–1993 and 1997–1999), Minister for Interior (1996–1997)
- Otiko Afisa Djaba, Minister for Gender, Children and Social Protection (2017–2018)
- John Tia, Minister for Information (2010–2012)
- Mustapha Abdul-Hamid, Minister for Information (2017–2018), Minister for Zongo and Inner City Development (2018–2021), chief executive officer of National Petroleum Authority (2021–)
- Roger Joseph Felli, Commissioner for Works and Housing (January 1972–November 1972), Commissioner for Industries (1972-1974), Commissioner for Economic Planning (1974–1975), Commissioner for Foreign Affairs (1975–1979)
- D. A. Iddisah, Northern Regional Commissioner (1972-1973), Brong Ahafo Regional Commissioner (1973–1974), Commissioner for Trade and Tourism (1974–1975), Commissioner for Transport and Communications (1975-1976), Commissioner for Lands and Mineral Resources (1976–1977)
- George Minyila, Upper Regional Commissioner (1972–1973), Regional Commissioner for the Eastern Region (1973–1975), Commissioner for Industries (1975–1976), Commissioner for Local Government (31 May 1976 - 31 July 1976), Ghana ambassador to Burkina Faso (with oversight in Mali) (2001–2006)
- John S. Nabila, Minister for Information and Tourism (1980–1981), president of the National House of Chiefs from (2008-2016)
- Abubakar Boniface Siddique, Minister of Youth, Labour, and Employment (2005–2007), Minister of Water Resources, Public Works and Housing (2007–2009)
- Mubarak Mohammed Muntaka, Minister for Youth and Sports (January 2009–June 2009)
- C. D. Benni, Commissioner for NRC Affairs (1972–1974), formerly Ghana's ambassador to Togo and Benin, and Liberia
- Edward Mahama, formerly flag bearer of the People's National Convention (PNC), currently Ghana's Ambassador-at-Large
- Solomon Namliit Boar, North East Regional Minister (2019–)
- Gilbert Seidu Iddi, Northern Regional Minister (1997-1998 and 2000–2001), Volta Regional Minister (1998-2000)
- Joshua Alabi, Greater Accra Regional Minister (1997-1998 and 2000–2001), Northern Regional (1998-2000)
- Mohammed Amin Adam, former Deputy Minister for the Northern Region, Former Deputy Minister of State for Finance and Member of parliament for Karaga (2021–)
- Adam Mahama, Member of parliament for Damango-Daboya Constituency (1997–2001)
- Jacob Bawiine Boon, Member of parliament for Lambussie (1993–1997)
- Emmanuel Samba Zumakpeh, Member of parliament for Nadowli South (1993–2005)
- Zuwera Ibrahimah, Member of parliament for Salaga South (2021–)
- Alhassan Wayo Seini, Member of parliament for Tamale Central (2005–2006)
- Said Sinare, Member of parliament for Ayawaso Central (1993–1997), Ghana ambassador to Egypt (2012–2014), Ghana ambassador to Saudi Arabia (2014–2017)
- Ben Baluri Saibu, Member of parliament for West Mamprusi (1993–1997)
- Yusuf Iddrisu, Member of parliament for Yendi (1993–1997)
- Basit Abdulai Fuseini, Member of parliament for Gakpegu-Sabongida (1993–1997)
- Edward Aliedong Alhassan, Member of parliament Damango-Daboya (1993–1997)
- Muhammad Bawah Braimah, Member of parliament for Ejura-Sekyedumase (2017–)
- Issifu Pangabu Mohammed, Member of parliament for Ejura-Sekyedumase (2005–2013)
- Daniel Abdulai Bayensi, Member of parliament for Nalerigu (1969–1972)
- Yakubu Mohammed, Member of parliament for Ahafo Ano South East (2025–)
- Francis Badgie, Ghana's High Commissioner to the United Kingdom (1980–1982)
- Kojo Bonsu, Metropolitan Chief Executive of Kumasi (2013–2016)
- Dominic Akuritinga Ayine, Member of Parliament for Bolgatanga East and 27th Attorney General of Ghana

=== Judges ===
- Joseph Bawa Akamba, Justice of the Supreme Court of Ghana (2012–2016)
- William Atuguba, Justice of the Supreme Court of Ghana (1995–2018)

=== Academia ===
- Mohammed-Sani Abdulai, academic
- J. K. Acquaye, Professor of Haematology, president of the West African College of Physicians (2003–2004)

=== Business, banking and finance ===
- Abdul Nashiru Issahaku, Governor of the Bank of Ghana (2016–2017)
- Ibrahim Mahama, Ghanaian engineer and businessman

=== Media ===
- Amin Alhassan, 17th Director General of the Ghana Broadcasting Corporation (2019–)
- Albert Don-Chebe, 15th Director General of the Ghana Broadcasting Corporation (2013–2016)

=== Military and police ===
- Chemogoh Kevin Dzang, Chief of the Naval Staff (1973–1974 and 1975–1977)
- Joshua Hamidu, Chief of Defence Staff (1978–1979)
- Michael Samson-Oje, Chief of Air Staff (2009–2016) and Chief of Defence Staff (2016–2017)
- Issah Adam Yakubu, Chief of the Naval Staff (2021–)
- Bawa Andani Yakubu, Inspector General of the Ghana Police Service (1969–1971)

=== Religion ===
- Lucas Abadamloora, Catholic Bishop of the Diocese of Navrongo-Bolgatanga
- Philip Naameh, Bishop of the Roman Catholic Archdiocese of Tamale

=== Sports ===
- Lepowura Alhaji M.N.D Jawula, President of the Ghana Football Association (GFA) (1997–2000)

== Former Headmasters ==
1. 1960–1964 Mr. Kenneth L. Purser
2. 1964–1967 Mr. B. O. Ayittey
3. 1967–1969 Mr. A. F. Clayton
4. Sept. 1969–1970 Mr. W. A. Ofori
5. 1970–1973 Mr. Adu
6. 1973–1980 Alhaji Rahimu Gbadamoshi
7. 1980-1982 Mr Abu Juan
8. 1981–1982 Mr. S. M. Amankwa
9. 1983–1986 Mr. Mahama Adam (AG)
10. 1986–1988 Mr. L. M. Awuni (AG)
11. 1988–1990 Mr. E. K. Kudiabor
12. 1990–1991 Mr. A. A. Daramanu
13. 1991–1998 Mr. Bolina Saaka
14. 1998–2001 Alhaji Amadu Belko
15. Feb. 2001 – Oct. 2001 Mrs. Mary Asobayire Dan-Braimah (AG)
16. Oct. 2001–2004.. Alhaji Mahamadu Saani Abdul-Rahman
17. 2005–2008 Alhaji T. A. Mahama
18. 2004–2005 Mr. J. B. Dakorah
19. 2008–2016 Mr. J. B. Dakorah
20. 2008–2016 Mrs. Mary Asobayire Dan-Braimah
21. 2016–ŋun na beni Hajia Amina Musah
22. 2017-2021 Shaibu Adams Wilberforce
23. 2021-2023 Rev Edward Azika
24. 2024–Present Yakubu Mohammed Mustapha

== Assistant Headmasters/Headmistresses Of Administration ==
- Baba Abdulai(Assistant Headmaster in charge of administration)
- Madam Celestine Ninnoni

== See also ==
- List of senior high schools in Ghana

== School Code ==
0080101

== School Motto ==
FORTITER FIDELITER FELICITER
