= Kwame Agbo =

Ghanaian soldier and politician

Lieutenant Colonel Kodzo Agbo

Member of the National Redemption Council
- In office 13 January 1972 – 9 October 1975
- President: Colonel I. K. Acheampong

Commissioner for Local Government
- In office 9 October 1975 – 14 October 1975
- President: Colonel I. K. Acheampong
- Preceded by: Major General N. A. Aferi
- Succeeded by: Lt. Col. B. K. Ahlijah

Commissioner for Labour and Social Welfare
- In office ? – 9 October 1975
- President: Colonel I. K. Acheampong
- Preceded by: Major Kwame Asante
- Succeeded by: Rear Admiral Joy Amedume

Commissioner for Industry
- In office 1972–?
- President: Colonel I. K. Acheampong
- Preceded by: Richard Quarshie
- Succeeded by: Lt. Col. George Minyila

Personal details
- Born: November 29, 1937
- Died: January 28, 2021 (aged 83)
- Profession: Soldier

Military service
- Allegiance: Ghana Armed Forces
- Branch/service: Ghana Army
- Rank: Lieutenant Colonel
- Unit: First Infantry Battalion
- Commands: Second-in-Command

Lieutenant Colonel Kodzo Barney Agbo (1937-2021) was a Ghanaian soldier and politician. He was a member of the National Redemption Council (NRC), which overthrew the government of Kofi Abrefa Busia on 13 January 1972.

== Military career ==
The last position Agbo held in the Ghana Armed Forces before getting involved with politics was as Second in Command of the First Infantry Battalion of the Ghana Army based at Tema with the rank of Major.

== Politics ==
Colonel Kutu Acheampong was the leader and Head of State after the 13 January 1972 coup d'état. The people he is reputed to have trusted with plans for the coup include Major Agbo, Major Kwame Baah, who was the Second in Command of the Fifth Infantry Battalion in Accra, and Major Anthony Selormey, who was the Second in Command of the Armoured Reconnaissance Squadron in Accra. He became one of the members of the NRC. He initially served as the Commissioner for Industry. Still, Kutu Acheampong later appointed him the Commissioner for Labour, Social Welfare and Co-operatives until the NRC was superseded by the Supreme Military Council (SMC) on 9 October 1975. The formation of the SMC removed Agbo, Selormey, and Baah from the executive government council. He was appointed the Commissioner for Local Government. Agbo felt that the three of them had been shortchanged by Kutu Acheampong and opted to resign from the government shortly afterward.

== See also ==
- National Redemption Council
- Supreme Military Council, Ghana

Political offices
Preceded by Richard Quarshie	Commissioner for Industry; 1972 – ?	Succeeded by Lt. Col. Minyila
Preceded by Major Kwame Asante	Commissioner for Labour and Social Welfare ? – 1975	Succeeded by Rear Admiral Amedume
Preceded by Major General N. A. Aferi	Commissioner for Local Government; 1975	Succeeded by Lt. Col. B. K. Ahlijah
