= Kofi Badu =

Ghanaian politician

Commissioner for Consumer Affairs
- In office 1978–1979
- President: Ignatius Kutu Acheampong
- Preceded by: New
- Succeeded by: Anyetei Kwakwranya
- In office 26 June 1979 – September 1979
- President: John Rawlings
- Preceded by: Anyetei Kwakwranya

Commissioner for Sports and Local Government
- In office January 1979 – 26 June 1979
- President: Fred Akuffo

Member of Parliament for Manso
- In office June 1965 – February 1966
- President: Dr. Kwame Nkrumah
- Preceded by: New
- Succeeded by: Constituency abolished

Personal details
- Born: Kofi Badu Gold Coast
- Citizenship: Ghanaian

Kofi Badu was a Ghanaian politician and journalist. He served as a member of parliament during Ghana's first republic and a minister of state during the Supreme Military Council (SMC) era and the Armed Forces Revolutionary Council (AFRC) era. As a journalist, he was editor for various newspapers.

Badu was editor of various newspapers, including the Cape Coast Daily Mail and the Daily Gazette. He assisted T. D. Baffoe as a publicist for the Trades Union Congress and later became editor of the Ghanaian Times, with T. D. Baffoe as the chief editor. In June 1965, Badu became the member of parliament for the Manso constituency as a member of the Convention People's Party. He remained in parliament until the overthrow of the Nkrumah government in 1966. After the overthrow, Badu became the editor of the Evening Standard, a newspaper that was owned by Komla Agbeli Gbedemah.

In the 1969 parliamentary election, Badu contested for the Adansi constituency seat on the ticket of the National Alliance of Liberals but lost to Stephen Nuamah of the Progress Party, who polled 7,812 votes against Badu's 2,292 votes. During the second republic, Badu was the editor and owner of the Spokesman newspaper.

After the overthrow of the Busia government, he was appointed the National Redemption Council (NRC) spokesman for the press. In early 1978 he was appointed Commissioner for Consumer Affairs by the then ruling government, the Supreme Military Council (which was the NRC from 1972 until 1975). In 1979 he became the Commissioner of Sports and Local Government. He remained in this post until June 1979 when the SMC was overthrown.

During the Armed Forces Revolutionary Council (AFRC) rule, he was reverted to the ministry of Consumer Affairs in June 1979, and served in this capacity until September 1979, when the military government handed over to civilian rule. Badu later became Chairman of the Press Commission.

== See also ==
- List of MPs elected in the 1965 Ghanaian parliamentary election
- Minister for Local Government (Ghana)
- Supreme Military Council (Ghana)
- Armed Forces Revolutionary Council, Ghana
