= Emmanuel Nyante =

Ghanaian soldier and politician

Emmanuel Obeng Nyante

Commissioner for Education, Youth and Culture
- In office 1974 – October 1975
- President: Colonel I. K. Acheampong
- Preceded by: Lt-Colonel Paul Nkegbe
- Succeeded by: E. Owusu-Fordwouh

Volta Regional Commissioner
- In office May 1973 – January 1974
- President: Colonel I. K. Acheampong
- Preceded by: Major P. K. D. Habadah
- Succeeded by: Colonel J. A. Kabore

Eastern Regional Commissioner
- In office 1972–1973
- President: Colonel I. K. Acheampong
- Preceded by: G. L. A. Djabanor
- Succeeded by: Lt. Col. George Minyila

Military service
- Allegiance: Ghana Armed Forces
- Branch/service: Ghana Army
- Rank: Colonel

Colonel Emmanuel Obeng Nyante is a Ghanaian soldier and politician. He was a member of the National Redemption Council (NRC) government which ruled Ghana between January 1972 and October 1975 following a military coup led by Colonel Kutu Acheampong.

Following the overthrow of the constitutionally elected Progress Party government of Kofi Abrefa Busia, Nyante was appointed as a member of the NRC which formed a military government. He first served as the Eastern Regional Commissioner from January 1972 to 1973.

In May 1973, he was moved to the Volta Region where he replaced Major P. K. D. Habadah as the Volta Regional Commissioner until January 1974.

In 1974, Nyante became the Commissioner for Education, Youth and Culture. He held this position until the NRC was replaced by the Supreme Military Council in October 1975.
(Commissioner for Education, Youth and Culture)
