= C. D. Benni =

Ghanaian politician

Member of the National Redemption Council
- In office 13 January 1972 – 9 October 1975
- President: Colonel Acheampong

Commissioner for NRC Affairs
- In office January 1972 – c. 1974
- President: Colonel Acheampong
- Preceded by: T. D. Brodie-Mends
- Succeeded by: Colonel C. R. Tachie-Menson

Ambassador to Togo and Benin
- In office 13 January 1972 – 9 October 1975
- President: Lt. General Akuffo

Ambassador to Liberia
- President: Colonel Acheampong

Personal details
- Born: Chemogo Dodzil Benni; 15 March 1939 (age 87) Nandom, Ghana
- Profession: Soldier

Military service
- Allegiance: Ghana Armed Forces
- Branch/service: Ghana Army
- Years of service: 1959–1975
- Rank: Lieutenant Colonel
- Unit: Third Infantry Battalion
- Commands: Commander

Lieutenant Colonel Chemogo Dodzil Benni is a Ghanaian soldier, politician and diplomat. He was a member of the National Redemption Council (NRC) military government which ruled Ghana between January 1972 and October 1975.

== Early life and education ==
Benni was born at Nandom, now in the Upper West Region of Ghana where the Dagaaba people are located. His secondary school education was at the Government Secondary School at Tamale between 1954 and 1958.

== Military career ==
Benni enlisted in the Ghana Army in 1959. He underwent training at the Ghana Military Academy at Teshie, near Accra. He then proceeded to the Indian Military Academy at Dehra Dun for further studies between 1960 and 1962. He also studied at Fort Leavenworth in the United States. He later rose to become the commander of the Third Battalion of the Second Infantry Brigade (now Central Command of the Ghana Army). He was deployed with Ghanaian troops for peacekeeping duties in the Congo with the United Nations peacekeeping mission in Congo in 1962 where he served as a platoon commander and then as an assistant liaison officer at the headquarters in Kinshasa.

On his return to Ghana, he was appointed company commander of the Fifth Infantry Battalion based at Accra. He was moved to the Ministry of Defence as the Deputy Assistant Adjutant-General in 1966. Benni then became the Brigade Major of the First Infantry Brigade group (now Southern Command) in Accra in 1967. In 1968, he was transferred to Tamale where he served at the Sixth Battalion. His final posting in the army was as Commander of the Third Infantry Battalion based at Sunyani, now in the Bono Region in 1970.

== Politics ==
Although Benni was not among the soldiers who initiated the 13 January 1972 coup d'état to overthrow the Busia government, he was one of the first to be appointed onto the original NRC. He was also made the Commissioner for NRC Affairs. In May 1973, he led the delegation which arranged for the return of the body of Kwame Nkrumah from Guinea to Ghana where Nkrumah had been living in exile since the coup of 24 February 1966.

He was dropped when the NRC was replaced by the Supreme Military Council to accommodate the most senior military officers in government. He was also appointed the Commissioner for information in January 1972.

== Diplomatic service ==
During the era of the Supreme Military Council, Benni was appointed as Ghana's ambassador to Liberia and in 1979, reappointed as ambassador with concurrent accreditation to Togo and Benin.

== See also ==
- National Redemption Council
