= 1978 Ghanaian governmental referendum =

Ghanaian referendum

30 March 1978
- Do you approve whether or not some form of Union Government would become the basis of Ghana's political system?

Results
Choice	Votes	%
Yes	1,372,427	60.12%
No	910,386	39.88%

A referendum on the system of government was held in Ghana on 30 March 1978.

== Background ==
In December 1971 the government of Kofi Abrefa Busia drastically devalued the cedi. However, the authorities' inability to control the subsequent inflationary pressures led to discontent, and military officers seized power in a bloodless coup on 13 January 1972.

The coup leaders, led by Col. Ignatius Kutu Acheampong, formed the National Redemption Council (NRC) to which they admitted other officers, the head of the police, and one civilian. The NRC promised improvements in the quality of life for all Ghanaians and based its programs on nationalism, economic development, and self-reliance. In 1975, a government reorganization resulted in the NRC's replacement by the Supreme Military Council (SMC), also headed by now-General Acheampong.

Unable to deliver on its promises, the NRC/SMC became increasingly marked by mismanagement and rampant corruption. In 1977, General Acheampong brought forward the concept of union government (UNIGOV), which would make Ghana a non-party state.

== Question ==
The referendum posed the question:

- Do you approve whether or not some form of Union Government would become the basis of Ghana's political system?

There were 4,497,803 registered voters for the referendum.

== Results ==
Choice	Votes	%
For	1,372,427	60.12
Against	910,386	39.88
Total	2,282,813	100.00
Registered voters/turnout	4,497,803	–
Source: African Elections Database

== Aftermath ==
Although the referendum passed, professional groups and students perceived UNIGOV to be ploy by Acheampong to retain power, and continued the strikes and demonstrations against the government which had begun in 1977. The steady erosion in Acheampong's power led to his arrest in July 1978 by his chief of staff, Lt. Gen. Fred Akuffo, who replaced him as head of state and leader of what became known as the SMC-2.

Akuffo abandoned UNIGOV and established a plan to return to constitutional and democratic government. A Constitutional Assembly was established, and political party activity was revived. Akuffo was unable to solve Ghana's economic problems, however, or to reduce the rampant corruption in which senior military officers played a major role. On 4 June 1979, his government was deposed in a violent coup by a group of junior and non-commissioned officers - the Armed Forces Revolutionary Council (AFRC) - with Flt. Lt. Jerry Rawlings as its chairman. Presidential and parliamentary elections were held in the summer of 1979.
