= Faustina Acheampong =

First Lady of the Republic of Ghana

First Lady of Ghana
- In role January 13, 1972 – July 5, 1978
- Preceded by: Adeline Y. Akufo-Addo
- Succeeded by: Emily Akuffo

Personal details
- Born: July 2nd (Gold Coast (British colony)) Gold Coast
- Party: National Redemption Council; Supreme Military Council
- Spouse: Ignatius Kutu Acheampong
- Profession: First Lady, Campaigner

Faustina Acheampong (/əˈtʃæmˈpɒŋ/ ə-CHAM-PONG-G) was the First Lady of the Republic of Ghana from 1972 to 1978. She was the spouse of General Ignatius Kutu Acheampong, Chairman of the National Redemption Council and Supreme Military Council and Head of state of Ghana from 1972 to 1978.

== Office ==
She lost her position to Emily Akuffo, when General Acheampong was toppled in a Palace Coup led by General Fred W.K. Akuffo, who then formed the Supreme Military Council II (SMC II) Government. This regime while in the process of bringing Ghana back to Constitutional Governance was itself toppled by the Armed Forces Revolutionary Council, led by Jerry Rawlings.

== Post First Lady ==
She has most recently been living in the UK and has been involved with charitable institutions working with Ghana.
