= D. A. Iddisah =

Ghanaian soldier and politician (born 1936)

Lieutenant Colonel David Amadu Iddisah

Commissioner for Lands and Mineral Resources
- In office 1 June 1976 – 1977
- President: Colonel I. K. Acheampong
- Preceded by: Col. T. T. Kutin
- Succeeded by: Col. Abdulai Ibrahim

Commissioner for Transport and Communications
- In office 9 October 1975 – 1 June 1976
- President: Colonel I. K. Acheampong
- Preceded by: Col. T. T. Kutin
- Succeeded by: Col. P. K. Agyekum

Commissioner for Trade and Tourism
- In office 2 January 1974 – 9 October 1975
- President: Colonel I. K. Acheampong
- Preceded by: Col. Roger Joseph Felli
- Succeeded by: Lt. Col. K. A. Quarshie

Brong Ahafo Regional Commissioner
- In office 30 May 1973 – 2 January 1974
- President: Colonel I. K. Acheampong
- Preceded by: Lt. Col. Victor Coker-Appiah
- Succeeded by: J. A Kyeremeh

Northern Regional Commissioner
- In office 28 January 1972 – 30 May 1973
- President: Colonel I. K. Acheampong
- Preceded by: Alhassan Braimah
- Succeeded by: Col. P. K. Agyekum

Personal details
- Born: 29 October 1936 (age 89)
- Education: Tamale Senior High School
- Profession: Soldier

Military service
- Allegiance: Ghana Armed Forces
- Branch/service: Ghana Army
- Rank: Lieutenant colonel

Alhaji David Amadu Iddisah (born 29 October 1936) was a Ghanaian military officer and politician who served in various capacities in the National Redemption Council and Supreme Military Council (Ghana) governments as well as the military.

== Early life and education ==
Iddisah was born on 29 October 1936, in Maluwe in the Savannah Region which was at the time within the Northern Region of Ghana. He attended the Government Secondary School in Tamale (now Tamale Senior High School), where he completed his secondary education in 1955. He enlisted in the Ghana Army soon after leaving secondary school, and was selected for military training at the Regular Officers' Special Training School at Teshie in 1956. In the subsequent years, he attended various courses at various military schools overseas. These included the Royal Military Academy, Sandhurst from 1956 to 1959, the Young Officers Course at Aldershot, England in 1959 and the Transportation Officer's Advanced course at Fort Eustis in Virginia, US, from 1969 to 1970.

== Career ==
Iddisah served as a platoon commander in the Congo during the UN-Congo Operations. During the National Liberation Council (NLC) regime, he served as a member of the Northern Regional Committee of Administration. Prior to the take-over of the Busia administration on 13 January 1972, Iddisah was acting director of Supplies and Transport at the Ministry of Defence, Accra. Following the overthrow, Iddisah was appointed Regional Commissioner in charge of the Northern Region. He served in this capacity until 15 May 1973 when he was made Regional Commissioner for the Brong Ahafo region. On 2 January 1974, he was appointed Commissioner for Trade and Tourism and he remained in this post until 9 October 1975 when the National Redemption Council was reconstituted as the Supreme Military Council. Following the changes in administration, he was appointed Commissioner for Transport and Communications until 1 June 1976. He was then put in charge of the Ministry for Lands and Mineral Resources as commissioner. Iddisah retired from the armed forces in 1977. In 1979, when the Armed Forces Revolutionary Council (AFRC) overthrew the Supreme Military Council, he was arrested and a 15-year sentence was pronounced on him.

== Personal life ==
Iddisah was married and had four children. He had a keen interest in reading and electronics, enjoyed listening to music, and did gardening during his leisure hours.
