= Kwakye =

Kwakye is a name. Notable people with the name include:

== Given name ==
- Kwakye Addo (born 1951), Ghanaian politician
- Kwakye Darfour (born 1957), Ghanaian politician

== Middle name ==
- Felix Kwakye Ofosu (fl. 2018–19), Ghanaian politician
- Kwabena Kwakye Anti (born 1923), Ghanaian lecturer and politician

== Surname ==
- Benjamin Kwakye (born 1967), Ghanaian novelist and lawyer
- Benjamin Samuel Kofi Kwakye (fl. 1978–79), Ghanaian police official
- Isaac Kwakye (born 1977), Ghanaian footballer
- Jeanette Kwakye (born 1983), English sprinter and sports broadcaster

== Other ==
- Jacob Kwakye-Maafo (born 1940), Ghanaian physician
- Peter Yaw Kwakye-Ackah (born 1957), Ghanaian politician
