= George Minyila =

Ghanaian soldier and politician

Lieutenant Colonel George Minyila

Ghana ambassador to Burkina Faso (with oversight in Mali)
- In office 1 November 2001 – 2006
- President: John Kufuor
- Preceded by: Baffour Assasie-Gyimah
- Succeeded by: Mogtari Sahanun

Commissioner for Local Government
- In office 31 May 1976 – 31 July 1976
- President: Colonel I. K. Acheampong
- Preceded by: Lt. Col. B. K. Ahlijah
- Succeeded by: Major E. Yirimambo

Commissioner for Industries
- In office 1975–1976
- President: Colonel I. K. Acheampong
- Preceded by: Paul Kwame Nkegbe
- Succeeded by: Lt. Col. B. K. Ahlijah

Eastern Regional Commissioner
- In office 1973–1975
- President: Colonel I. K. Acheampong
- Preceded by: Colonel Emmanuel Obeng Nyante
- Succeeded by: Colonel Kweku Adade Takyi

Upper Regional Commissioner
- In office 28 January 1972 – 1 January 1973
- President: Colonel I. K. Acheampong
- Preceded by: Salifu Imoro
- Succeeded by: W. C. O. Acquaye-Nortey

Personal details
- Born: 1934
- Died: 2016 (aged 81–82)
- Education: Tamale Senior High School
- Profession: Soldier

Military service
- Allegiance: Ghana Armed Forces
- Branch/service: Ghana Army
- Rank: Lieutenant Colonel

Colonel George Minyila (7 July 1938 – 2016) was a Ghanaian military officer, diplomat and politician who served in various capacities in the National Redemption Council and Supreme Military Council (Ghana) governments as well as the military during his lifetime. He is best remembered for his reforms in the Eastern Region of Ghana, where he was assigned under the policy of former Head of State Ignatius Kutu Acheampong to deploy Ministers to regions they did not hail from.

== Early life and education ==
Minyila was born on 7 July 1938, in Navrongo, a town in the Upper East Region of Ghana. He had his secondary education at the Government Secondary School in Tamale (now the Tamale Senior High School) from 1953 to 1957. After completing his secondary education, he joined the Ghana Armed Forces in 1958 and was later admitted to the Royal Military Academy in Sandhurst, United Kingdom, graduating in 1962.

After his graduation from Sandhurst, Minyila served in various positions within the Ghana Armed Forces. He enrolled at the Ghana Military Academy for the Company Commander Course in 1966 and a year later, studied a Small Weapons course in Britain. In 1968, he travelled to Toronto for a Junior Defence course. In 1969, he studied at the Staff College, Camberley until 1970.

== Career ==
Following his studies at the Staff College, Camberley, Minyila was made Platoon Commander until 1963. That same year, he became Adjutant of the Armed Forces Training College (AFTC) and worked in that capacity until 1964. In 1965, he was Adjutant of the 6th battalion in Takoradi and a year later he proceeded to the Ghana Military Academy for further studies.

Minyila's political career began during the regime of the Supreme Military Council (SMC). On 28 January 1972, Minyila was appointed Upper Regional Commissioner, a position he held until 1 January 1973 when he was transferred to the Eastern Region to serve as Regional Commissioner. During his tenure as Eastern Regional Commissioner, Minyila introduced reforms that transformed the region's infrastructure, including the eviction and relocation of the Zongo community from their slums in the middle of Koforidua, a move that paved the way for the planned settlements and good road networks in the Eastern regional capital. In 1975, when the National Redemption Council was reconstituted as the Supreme Military Council, he was appointed Commissioner for Industries. He served in this capacity until 31 May 1976 when he was moved to the Ministry of Local Government to serve as Commissioner for Local Government. In August 1976, he was appointed Director of Logistics at the Ghana Armed Forces.

However, Minyila's career took a hit in 1977 when he and 13 other military officers were detained on suspicion of plotting a coup to overthrow the then Acheampong government. He was eventually released on 4 August 1978, and his assets and those of his wife were unfrozen on 18 August 1978.

In 2002, Minyila was appointed Ghana's ambassador to Burkina Faso with oversight in Mali. He served in this capacity until 2006.

== Personal life ==
Minyila was married to Susanna Minyila and had several children, grandchildren, and great-grandchildren. He was known to have a passion for football and hockey.

== Honours and awards ==
In 2008, Minyila was awarded the Companion of the Order of the Volta by former President John Agyekum Kuffour for his contributions to security and public service.

== Death ==
Colonel George Minyila died in 2016. He was survived by his wives Susana Minyila and Selina Minyila, a number of children, grandchildren, and great-grandchildren.
