= Victor Coker-Appiah =

Ghanaian soldier

Colonel Victor Coker-Appiah

Brong-Ahafo Regional Commissioner
- In office 1974 – 30 April 1975
- President: Colonel Acheampong
- Preceded by: Commander J. A. Kyeremeh
- Succeeded by: Lt. Col. O. K. Abrefa

Commissioner for Works and Housing
- In office 1972–1974
- President: Colonel Acheampong
- Preceded by: Major Roger Felli
- Succeeded by: Colonel R. E. A. Kotei

Commissioner for Local Government
- In office 1972–1972
- President: Colonel Acheampong
- Preceded by: Major General N. A. Aferi

Personal details
- Education: Royal Military Academy Sandhurst
- Alma mater: Achimota School
- Profession: Soldier

Military service
- Allegiance: Ghana Armed Forces
- Branch/service: Ghana Army
- Rank: Colonel
- Unit: Field Engineers Regiment

Victor Coker-Appiah was a Ghanaian soldier and politician. He served in various capacities in the National Redemption Council (NRC) military government led by Colonel I. K. Acheampong which overthrew the civilian elected government led by Kofi Abrefa Busia.

== Education and training ==
Coker-Appiah attended Achimota School for his secondary education. After joining the Ghana Army, he became one of the first Ghanaians to be commissioned into the Engineers Regiment. He was also one of the first Ghanaians to train at the Royal Military Academy Sandhurst for between 1957 and 1958. He was promoted to the rank of Major in August 1965.

== Politics ==
Coker-Appiah is reported to be one of the officers who was involved in the overthrow of President Kwame Nkrumah's Convention People's Party (CPP) government. He was responsible for arresting the Director of Military Intelligence among others. He was the commander of the Field Engineers Regiment based at Wajir Barracks at Teshie in Accra at the time.

During the era of the National Liberation Council (NLC) military government, Coker-Appiah was the administrative head for the Western Region in 1969. He was instrumental in averting a strike by staff of the Prestea State Farms Corporation in the region during this period.

Following the abortive attempt in April 1967 to overthrow the NLC government, Coker-Appiah led investigations that resulted in the public execution of the leaders.

Colonel Acheampong initially appointed him as Commissioner for Local Government. He was moved shortly afterwards to be the head for the Ministry of Works and Housing. In 1974, he was transferred to the Brong-Ahafo region where he became the Regional Commissioner.

In April 1975, he was removed from the NRC government and later appointed the military attaché to the Organisation of African Unity (OAU) in Addis Ababa, Ethiopia.

Political offices
Preceded by Kwabena Kwakye Anti	Commissioner for Local Government; 1972 – 1972	Succeeded by Nathan Apea Aferi
Preceded by Major Roger Felli	Commissioner for Works and Housing; 1972 – 1974	Succeeded by Robert Kotei
Preceded by S. D. Dombo	Brong-Ahafo Regional Commissioner; 1974 – 1975	Succeeded by Lt. Col. Selormey
