= Edward Kwaku Utuka =

Ghanaian military officer (1937–1979)

- Born: 27 January 1937; Likpe-Mate, Ghana
- Died: 16 June 1979 (aged 42); Accra, Ghana
- Military career
- Allegiance: Ghana
- Service years: 19??–1979
- Rank: Major general
- Commands: Border guards Ghana Military Academy; Second Infantry Battalion

Edward Kwaku Utuka (27 January 1937 – 16 June 1979) was a Ghanaian military officer, who held the rank of major general of the Ghana Armed Forces, was a former border guards commander and member of the Supreme Military Council I & II, the ruling government of Ghana from 9 October 1975 to 4 June 1979.

== Early life and education ==
Utuka was born on 27 January 1937, at Likpe-Mate in the Volta Region of Ghana. He had his secondary education at the Accra Academy and took to teaching before joining the military.

== Military career ==
Utuka attended the Royal Military Academy Sandhurst in the United Kingdom. He served in the Ghana Armed Forces and was active during the Congo Crisis. In July 1961, he was commissioned as a Second Lieutenant in the Ghana Army. He rose to the rank of Lieutenant Colonel and was appointed commander of the Second Battalion based at Takoradi. In 1975, he became the Border Guards commander.

== Politics ==
In October 1975, after the formation of the Supreme Military Council (SMC) as the military government replacing the National Redemption Council, he became a member of government as all the service commanders became members of the SMC.

== Execution ==
Following the military coup d'état which replaced the SMC government of Lt. General Akuffo with the Armed Forces Revolutionary Council, he was executed, along with former head-of-state Acheampong on 16 June 1979.
