= 1970s in Ghana =

1970s in Ghana details events of note that happened in Ghana in the years 1970 to 1979.

== Events ==
- August 1970 - National Liberation commission dissolved.
- 7 July 1972 - Kwame Nkrumah buried.
- October 1975 - the National Redemption Council is reorganized into the Supreme Military Council (SMC).
- 1977 - SMC faces mounting nonviolent opposition.
- March 1978 - national referendum held allow Ghanaians to accept or reject the union government concept.
- July 1978 - some SMC officers force I. K. Acheampong to resign, replacing him with Lieutenant General Frederick W.K. Akuffo.
- 1 January 1979 - ban on party politics lifted.
- 1979 - constitutional assembly working on a new constitution presents an approved draft to government.
- 15 May 1979 - a group of junior officers led by Flight Lieutenant Jerry Rawlings attempt a coup.
- Coup is unsuccessful, the coup leaders were jailed and held for court-martial.
- June 4, sympathetic military officers overthrow the SMC II government led by W. K. Akuffo.
- June 1979 - Jerry Rawlings and other junior officers released from prison.
- 1979 - Rawlings and the young officers form the Armed Forces Revolutionary Council (AFRC).
- 1979 - executions of former heads of military governments, including leading members of the SMC.
- September 1979 - Ghana returns to constitutional rule.
- 24 September 1979 - Hilla Limann, leader of the People's National Party (PNP), sworn in as president of Ghana.
- 24 September 1979 - the Third Republic begins.

== Deaths ==
- 27 April 1972 - Kwame Nkrumah, first president of Ghana, natural causes in Romania (b. 1909).

== National holidays ==
- January 1: New Year's Day
- March 6: Independence Day
- May 1: Labor Day
- December 25: Christmas
- December 26: Boxing Day

In addition, several other places observe local holidays, such as the foundation of their town. These are also "special days."
