= L. K. Kodjiku =

Ghanaian soldier and politician (1931–2022)

Lawrence Kpabitey Kodjiku

Northern Regional Commissioner
- In office 1978 – September 1979
- President: John Rawlings
- Preceded by: Major R. K. Zumah
- Succeeded by: Alhaji I. Haruna

Regional Commissioner for the Greater Accra Region
- In office 1977–1978
- President: Ignatius Kutu Acheampong
- Preceded by: Lt. Col. William Adjei Thompson
- Succeeded by: Commander G. E. Osei

Regional Commissioner for the Ashanti Region
- In office 9 October 1975 – 1977
- President: Ignatius Kutu Acheampong
- Preceded by: Commander Joy K. Amedume
- Succeeded by: Commander G. E. Osei

Personal details
- Born: Lawrence Kpabitey Kodjiku; 30 July 1931 Odumase-Krobo, Eastern Region, Gold Coast
- Died: 2022 (aged 91)
- Citizenship: Ghana
- Education: Presbyterian Boys' Senior High School
- Alma mater: Presbyterian College of Education, Akropong; University of Ghana
- Known for: First Director of the National Service Secretariat

Lawrence Kpabitey Kodjiku (30 July 1931 – 2022) was a Ghanaian soldier and politician. He was the first Director of the National Service Secretariat from 1973 to 1975, Regional Commissioner (Regional Minister) of the Ashanti Region from 1975 to 1977, Greater Accra Regional Commissioner from 1977 to 1978, and the Northern Regional Commissioner from 1978 to 1979.

== Early life and education ==
Kodjiku was born on 30 July 1931 at Odumase-Krobo. He had his early education at the Presbyterian Middle School in Bana Hill where he obtained his standard 7 certificate in 1947. He had his secondary education at the Presbyterian Secondary School (now the Presbyterian Boys Senior High School, Legon) from 1948 until 1952 when he received his Cambridge School Certificate. After his secondary school studies, he enrolled at the Presbyterian Teachers Training College, Akropong (now the Presbyterian College of Education, Akropong), where he was awarded his Teachers' Training Certificate (Teachers' Certificate 'A'). He entered the University of Ghana in 1962 where he was awarded his Bachelor of Arts degree in 1965.

== Career ==
Kodjiku begun as a teacher in 1955, teaching in primary, middle, and secondary schools and also Polytechnics until 1962 when he enrolled at the University of Ghana. Following his studies at the University of Ghana, he taught briefly at Prempeh College prior to his commissioning into the Ghana Armed Forces Education Corps in 1965. From 1965 until 1967, he taught at the Ghana Military Academy, he was later moved to the Ministry of Defence where he served as the Staff Officer of the ministry's Education Directorate from 1967 to 1973.

Upon the establishment of the National Service Secretariat in 1973, Kodjiku was appointed the secretariat's first director. He served in this capacity until 1975. In 1975, when the National Redemption Council (NRC) was reconstituted into the Supreme Military Council (SMC), he was appointed as the Regional Commissioner for the Ashanti Region. He worked in this office until 1977 when he was appointed Greater Accra Regional Commissioner. In 1979, he was appointed Regional Commissioner for the Northern Region under the Armed Forces Revolutionary Council. In 1992, he became a member of the 1992 Electoral Commission.

== Personal life and death ==
Kodjiku retired from public service in 1980 and went into farming. His hobbies included reading and hunting. He was married with four children.

L. K. Kodjiku died in 2022, at the age of 91.
