= P. K. D. Habadah =

Ghanaian soldier and politician

Phillip Kofi Dovia Habada

Regional Commissioner for Greater Accra
- In office 30 May 1973 – 9 October 1975
- President: Ignatius Kutu Acheampong
- Preceded by: W. C. O. Acquaye-Nortey
- Succeeded by: William Adjei Thompson

Regional Commissioner for the Volta Region
- In office 1972 – 29 May 1973
- President: Ignatius Kutu Acheampong
- Preceded by: Alfred Senaya Kpodonu
- Succeeded by: J. A. Kabore

Personal details
- Born: Phillip Kofi Dovia Habadah; 6 April 1928 (age 98) Hatorgodo, Keta Municipal District, Volta Region, Gold Coast
- Citizenship: Ghanaian

Lt Col Kofi Dovia Habada was a Ghanaian army officer and politician. He was the Volta Regional Commissioner (Volta Regional Minister) from 1972 to May 1973, and the Greater Accra Regional Commissioner (Greater Accra Regional Minister) from 1973 to October 1975.

== Early life and education ==
Habada was born on 6 April 1928 at Hatorgodo, a suburb of the Keta Municipal District (then a part of the Anlo District) in the Volta Region of Ghana (then Gold Coast). He had his early education at the Abor Roman Catholic Mission School, and the Keta Roman Catholic Senior School until 1944.

== Career ==
Habada joined the Royal West African Frontier Force (RWAFF) in 1945, and a year later, he was made instructor of the Sierra Leone Army. In 1947 he became a Warrant Officer Class II, and that same year he was attached to the Educational wing of the African Frontier force, serving in this capacity for about ten years. In 1959, he was commissioned officer in the second Battalion, and served under Emmanuel Kwasi Kotoka as the Commander Pay Master of the Headquarters Company. He also worked as the Mechanical Transport Officer of the 2nd Battalion and the Ghana Military Academy and Training School. He later became the Deputy Adjutant, and the Quarter Master General of the Ghana Military Academy and Training School.

Following the 1966 overthrow of the Nkrumah government, Habada became a member of the Volta Regional Committee of Administration. He was the Camp Commandant at the Ghana Army Headquarters, and Officer in command of the Headquarters of the Military Academy Training School in Teshie.

Following the overthrow of the Busia government in 1972, he was appointed Commissioner for the Volta Region in the National Redemption Council (NRC) military government led by Colonel I. K. Acheampong. In May 1973 he became the Greater Accra Regional Commissioner, succeeding, W. C. O. Acquaye-Nortey. He remained in this position until 9 October 1975 when he was retired following the replacement of the NRC by the Supreme Military Council military government. He was succeeded by William Adjei Thompson.

== Personal life ==
Habada was married with eight children. His hobbies included reading, gardening, playing basketball, and playing volleyball.
