= J. C. Adjeitey =

Ghanaian soldier, dentist and politician

Commissioner for Health
- In office 1972–1973
- President: Colonel I. K. Acheampong
- Preceded by: Simon Diedong Dombo
- Succeeded by: Lt. Col. Anthony Selormey

Personal details
- Citizenship: Ghanaian
- Occupation: Soldier
- Profession: Dential surgeon

Military service
- Allegiance: Ghana
- Branch/service: Ghana Army
- Rank: Colonel

J. C. Adjeitey was a Ghanaian soldier and Commissioner for Health in the National Redemption Council military government.

Prior to his involvement in politics, Adjeitey worked as a dentist at the 37 Military Hospital in Accra. He was promoted from Major to Lieutenant Colonel in 1961.

== Politics ==
Following the overthrow of the Busia government by the military led by Colonel Acheampong in January 1972, Adjeitey was appointed the Commissioner for Health. He served in this capacity until 1973 when he was replaced by Lt. Colonel Selormey. He led the Ghana delegation to the 26th World Health Assembly of the World Health Organization (WHO) which took place in Geneva, Switzerland in 1973.

Political offices
Preceded by S. D. Dombo	Commissioner for Health; 1972 – 1973	Succeeded by Lt. Col. Selormey
