= Omaboe =

Omaboe is a surname. Notable people with the surname include:

- Emmanuel Noi Omaboe (1930–2005), Ghanaian civil servant, businessman and traditional ruler
- Grace Omaboe (born 1946), Ghanaian actress, singer and television personality
- William Codjoe Omaboe Acquaye-Nortey (born 1930), Ghanaian soldier and politician
