= J. A. Kabore =

Ghanaian soldier and politician

John Augustine Kabore

Volta Regional Commissioner
- In office January 1974 – 9 October 1975
- President: General I. K. Acheampong
- Preceded by: Col. E. O. Nyante
- Succeeded by: Lt. Colonel G. K. Amevor

Border Guard Unit Commander
- In office 1972 – January 1974
- President: Colonel I. K. Acheampong
- Preceded by: New position
- Succeeded by: Lt.General F. W. K. Akuffo

Chief Administrator, Korle Bu Hospital
- In office ???–1992
- Succeeded by: Commodore Pumpuni

Personal details
- Born: Ghana
- Died: Ghana
- Profession: Soldier
- Cabinet: National Redemption Council

Military service
- Allegiance: Ghana Armed Forces
- Branch/service: Border Guard Unit
- Rank: Colonel
- Commands: Border Guards Commander

Colonel John Augustine Kabore was a Ghanaian soldier and politician. He served as the Volta Regional Comissioner in the National Redemption Council (NRC) military government which ruled Ghana between January 1972 and October 1975.

== Military service ==
Kabore served in the Ghana Armed Forces prior to going into politics. Part of his training was at the Royal Military Academy Sandhurst. After the Border Guard Unit of the Armed Forces was created, Kabore served as its first commander.

== Politics ==
Following the 13 January 1972 coup-d'état, the NRC replaced the Progress Party government of Kofi Abrefa Busia. In January 1974, he was appointed the Volta Regional Commissioner in the military government. He served in this capacity until the NRC government was replaced by the Supreme Military Council (Ghana) on 9 October 1975. Kabore is considered by many as being very productive as the Volta Regional Minister.

== Health administration ==
Kabore served as the Chief Administrator of the biggest hospital in Ghana, the Korle-Bu Teaching Hospital until 1992 when he was replaced by Commodore Kwame Pumpuni.

== Honours ==
In December 2013, Kabore was awarded the Volta Heroes Awards posthumously along with six other persons by the Volta Heroes Foundation.

The Kabore Estates built during the era of the NRC government was named after him.

The Kabore School Complex which he established is also named after him.
