= A. S. O. Mensah =

Ghanaian politician

Regional Chief Executive for Greater Accra
- In office 1969 – January 1972
- President: Edward Akufo-Addo
- Prime Minister: Kofi Abrefa Busia
- Preceded by: J. G. Smith
- Succeeded by: W. C. O. Acquaye-Nortey

Personal details
- Born: Gold Coast
- Citizenship: Ghanaian

A. S. O. Mensah was a Ghanaian politician. He was the Regional Chief Executive (Regional Minister) of the Greater Accra Region from 1969 until 1972 when the Busia government was over thrown by the NRC military junta. As was the norm of the time, he was consequently imprisoned by the then military government together with state officials that had gained appointment in the Busia regime. He was released in 1973 by the same military government.

Mensah was an accountant by profession. He was an accountant at the Posts and Telecommunications (P&T) company (now Ghana Post, and Ghana Telecom) prior to his political appointment.
