= Baah =

Baah is a surname. Notable people with the surname include:

- Rebop Kwaku Baah (1944–1983), Ghanaian-Swedish musician
- Kofi Baah (born 1998), Ghanaian professional footballer
- Kwadwo Baah (born 2003), German-English footballer
- Kwame Baah (politician) (born 1938), Ghanaian soldier and government official
