= Paul Nkegbe =

Ghanaian soldier and politician

Colonel Paul Nkegbe

Commissioner for Health
- In office 1978–1978
- President: Colonel I. K. Acheampong
- Preceded by: Neville Alexander Odartey-Wellington
- Succeeded by: Emmanuel Evans-Anfom

Commissioner for Agriculture
- In office 1976–1978
- President: Colonel I. K. Acheampong
- Preceded by: Colonel Frank Bernasko
- Succeeded by: Lt. Col. Neville Alexander Odartey-Wellington

Commissioner for Industries
- In office 1974–1975
- President: Colonel I. K. Acheampong
- Preceded by: Colonel J. C. Adjeity
- Succeeded by: Colonel George Minyila

Commissioner for Education, Culture and Sports
- In office 28 January 1972 – 1 January 1974
- President: Colonel I. K. Acheampong
- Preceded by: R. R. Amponsah
- Succeeded by: Colonel Emmanuel Obeng Nyante

Personal details
- Born: 1934 (age 91–92)
- Education: St. Augustine's College, Cape Coast
- Alma mater: University of Ghana, Legon
- Profession: Soldier

Military service
- Allegiance: Ghana Armed Forces
- Branch/service: Ghana Army
- Rank: Colonel

Paul Kwame Nkegbe (born 26 April 1934) is a Ghanaian politician and military officer. He served as Commissioner for Education, Culture, and Sports, Commissioner for Industries, Commissioner for Agriculture and Commissioner for Health in Ghana.

== Early life and education ==
Nkegbe was born in Denu, in the Keta District of the Volta Region of Ghana in 1934. He began his early education at the Roman Catholic Mission School at Anfoega Akukome and completed his middle school education at the Roman Catholic Mission School in Abor in 1949. In 1950, Nkegbe enrolled at St. Augustine's College in Cape Coast and obtained the Cambridge School Leaving Certificate in 1953. After completing his secondary education, he worked for the Ghana Railways from 1953 to 1956 while continuing his studies in preparation for university. In 1956, he returned to St. Augustine's College to complete the Sixth Form course, after which he gained admission to the University of Ghana, Legon, in 1958. He pursued an honors course in history and graduated with a B.A. History (Second Class Honors) in 1961.

== Career ==
After graduating from the University of Ghana, Nkegbe was commissioned into the Ghana Army as a Lieutenant in August 1961. He was posted to the Military Academy as an Instructor and served in that capacity until 1966. In 1966, he was appointed Acting Defence Adviser to the Ghana High Commission in the United Kingdom, and subsequently became the Deputy Defence Adviser in 1967 and 1968.

In 1972, when the National Redemption Council (NRC) took over at the helm of Ghana's governmental affairs, Nkegbe was appointed Commissioner for Education, Culture, and Sports. On 2 January 1974 he was made Ghana's Commissioner for Industries. He remained in that position until October 1975, when he became Commissioner for Agriculture under the Supreme Military Council (SMC) regime. In 1978, Nkegbe was appointed Commissioner for Health under the Supreme Military Council (SMC) regime. He served in this capacity until he resigned later that same year in 1978 under Gen I K Acheampong’s Supreme Military Council (SMC) regime. The SMC was overthrown by SMC II. The SMC II regime and government was overthrown by the Armed Forces Revolutionary Council (AFRC) on 4 June 1979.

== Personal life ==
Nkegbe is married and has four children. He is known to be an all-around sportsman with a keen interest in various sports and games, particularly football and athletics. He also enjoys dancing and listening to music, and engages in backyard farming in his spare time.
