= Kwame Baah (politician) =

Ghanaian politician (1938–1997)

Commissioner of Lands and Mineral Resources
- In office February 1972 – November 1972
- President: Ignatius Kutu Acheampong
- Preceded by: T. D. Brodie-Mends
- Succeeded by: D. C. K. Amenu

17th Minister for Foreign Affairs (Ghana)
- In office 1972–1975
- President: Ignatius Kutu Acheampong
- Preceded by: Nathan Aferi
- Succeeded by: Roger Felli

Commissioner for Economic Planning
- In office 1975–1979
- President: Ignatius Kutu Acheampong
- Preceded by: Robert K. A. Gardiner
- Succeeded by: J. L. S. Abbey

Personal details
- Born: 21 May 1938 Dormaa Ahenkro, Gold Coast (now Ghana)
- Died: 8 April 1997 (aged 58)
- Profession: Soldier

Military service
- Allegiance: Ghana
- Branch/service: Ghana Army
- Rank: Colonel

Colonel Kwame R. M. Baah (21 May 1938 – 8 April 1997) was a soldier and politician. He was the Ghanaian foreign minister between 1972 and 1975.

Colonel (then Major) Kwame Baah was appointed minister for foreign affairs after the government of Kofi Abrefa Busia was overthrown in a coup d'état on 13 January 1972. This replaced the Progress Party government with the National Redemption Council. He was then appointed foreign minister by General (then Colonel) Ignatius Kutu Acheampong in 1972, a position he held till 1975.

== Early life and education ==
Baah was born on 21 May 1938 in Dormaa Ahenkro, in the Gold Coast (now Ghana). He enrolled at Prempeh College in 1953 and graduated in 1958. He continued at the Indian Military Academy in Dehra Dun, India, and subsequently enlisted in Ghana Army in March 1959. He joined Royal Officers' Specialist Training School, Teshie, in 1963.

== Career ==
Baah was commissioned as a regular infantry officer in June 1962. In Congo, he served as the company second-in-command, and later company commander of the Ghana Second Infantry Battalion from 1962 to 1963. He later became the inspector of the Ghana Military Academy and Training School, and staff officer to the Defence Adviser of the Ghana High Commission to the United Kingdom from 1966 to 1967. From 1967 to 1968, he served as the defence and armed forces attache of the Ghana Embassy in Washington DC. A year later, he was appointed second-in-command of the Second and Fifth Battalions, a position held until 1971. In 1972, he was made Second in Command of the Fifth Battalion of Infantry in Accra. Baah was one of the key soldiers involved in the coup that replaced the Busia government with the NRC together with Major K. B. Agbo and Major Selormey. He was later promoted to the post of lieutenant-colonel, and appointed Commissioner of Lands and Mineral Resources in 1972. In November 1972, he became the Commissioner for Foreign Affairs, he served in this capacity until 1975. He became a member of the Supreme Military Council when it was inaugurated in 1975, and in that same year, he was appointed Commissioner for Economic Planning. He held this position until 1979 when the SMC government was overthrown. Baah was consequently arrested and sentenced to 150 years imprisonment in July 1979. He was later released in October 1979.

== National Reconciliation Commission hearings ==
At the hearings of the National Reconciliation Commission in Accra on 1 June 2004, a Captain Koda is said to have reported that Colonel Kwame Baah and others were supposed to be among a third batch of officers to be executed during the era of the Armed Forces Revolutionary Council. This was never carried out. His successor as foreign minister, Col. Roger Felli was however executed along with five other army officers on 26 June 1979.

== Personal life ==
Baah married Esther Ayew on 21 May 1966. Together, they had three daughters. His hobbies included squash and tennis. He died on 8 April 1997.

Political offices
Preceded by Major General Nathan Apea Aferi	Foreign Minister; 1972 – 1975	Succeeded by Colonel Roger Felli
