= William Adjei Thompson =

Ghanaian soldier and politician (1937–2025)

Regional Commissioner for Greater Accra
- In office April 1988 – 1991
- President: Jerry John Rawlings
- Preceded by: Selina Taylor
- Succeeded by: Nii Okaidja Adamafio
- In office 1985–1986
- President: Jerry John Rawlings
- Preceded by: Amarkai Amarteifio
- Succeeded by: Selina Taylor
- In office 9 October 1975 – 1977
- President: Ignatius Kutu Acheampong
- Preceded by: P. K. D. Habadah
- Succeeded by: L. K. Kodjiku

Regional Commissioner for the Western Region
- In office 1986–1988
- President: Jerry John Rawlings
- Preceded by: E. G. A. Don-Arthur
- Succeeded by: John. R. E. Amenlemah

Regional Commissioner for the Central Region
- In office 1 July 1978 – 4 June 1979
- President: Ignatius Kutu Acheampong
- Preceded by: John A. K. Otoo
- Succeeded by: Kobena Gyapea Erbynn

Regional Commissioner for the Brong Ahafo Region
- In office 1977–1978
- President: Ignatius Kutu Acheampong
- Preceded by: O. K. Abrefa
- Succeeded by: R. K. Zumah

Personal details
- Born: William Adjei Thompson; 3 October 1937 Greater Accra Region, Gold Coast
- Died: 2025 (aged 87–88)
- Citizenship: Ghanaian
- Education: Accra Academy

William Adjei Thompson (3 October 1937 – 2025) was a Ghanaian soldier and politician. He was the Greater Accra Regional Commissioner (Greater Accra Regional Minister) from 1975 to 1977, the Regional Commissioner for the Brong Ahafo Region (Brong Ahafo Regional Minister) from 1977 to 1978, and the Central Regional Commissioner (Central Regional Minister) from 1978 to June 1979. In 1985, he was reappointed Greater Accra Regional Minister (Regional Secretary) and in 1986, appointed Regional Secretary for the Western Region. He remained in this position until April 1988 when he was made Greater Accra Regional Minister for a third time. He served in this capacity until 1991.

== Early life and education ==
Thompson was born in Accra on 3 October 1937. He studied at the Accra Academy where he obtained his West African School Certificate in 1958. Following his enlistment in the army, he undertook various post-commission courses, some of which include; the Platoon Commanders' Course which he took in 1962, and the Company Commanders' Course which he studied in 1966. He enrolled at the Junior Staff Defence College in 1967 and the Staff College in Kingston, Canada in 1971.

== Career ==
Following his secondary education, Thompson joined the Bank of West Africa in 1959 as an Accounts Clerk. He worked there for a year, and later gained employment at the Post and Telecommunications Department in Accra (now Ghana Post and Ghana Telecom) in 1961. In April that same year, Thompson enlisted in the Ghana Army. There he enrolled at the Officers' Cadet Training Course at the Ghana Military Academy, and was subsequently commissioned in the Ghana Army in April 1962. He became the Training Officer at the Armed Forces Training College in Kumasi, and the second brigade group's General Staff Officer at the group's headquarters. In 1968, he was made provost marshal, and a year later, Staff Officer II Coordinate (MOD) (PA). He worked in this capacity until 1971. He also doubled as the Sub-Assistant Deputy Director of Personnel Administration and the Deputy Director-General of Personnel Administration, responsible for Coordination in 1970. He became Brigade Major at the second brigade's Army Headquarters in November 1972, and the Third Battalion of Infantry's Commanding Officer from January 1973 until October 1975 when he gained appointment as the Greater Accra Regional Commissioner.

Thompson remained Regional Commissioner for the Greater Accra Region from 9 October 1975 to 1977 when he was made the Regional Commissioner for the Brong Ahafo Region. He served in this capacity for about one year. In 1978, he was appointed Regional Commissioner for the Central Region, he remained in this appointment until the Armed Forces Revolutionary Council coup in June 1979. He was subsequently recalled to barracks. In 1985 he was reappointed Greater Accra Regional Minister (the portfolio was then Regional Secretary), and a year later, appointed Regional Secretary for the Western Region. He served in this capacity from 1986 until April 1988 when he was reappointed Greater Accra Regional Minister for a third time. He served in this appointment until 1991. He was succeeded by Nii Okaidja Adamafio.

== Personal life and death ==
Thompson was married with three children. He died in 2025.
