= Eastern Regional Minister =

The Eastern Regional Minister is the Ghana government official is responsible for overseeing the administration of the country's Eastern Region, one of sixteen administrative regions in Ghana since a referendum in 2019. The region is home to a large part of the Akan ethnic group and its capital is Koforidua.

The Regional Minister replaced the previous roles of Regional Chief Executive, Regional Commissioner and Regional Secretary.

== List of Eastern Regional Ministers ==
Number	Minister	Took office	Left office	Government	Party
1	Emmanuel Humphrey Tettey Korboe (MP)	1957	1965	Nkrumah government	Convention Peoples' Party
2	Joseph Essilfie Hagan (MP)	1965	1966	Nkrumah government	Convention Peoples' Party
3	G. A. K. Dzansi (Eastern Regional Chief Executive)	1966	1969	National Liberation Council	Military government
4	Augustine Kwame Adu (Eastern Regional Chief Executive)	1969	1969	Busia government	Progress Party
5	G. L. A. Djabanor (Eastern Regional Chief Executive)	1970	1972	Busia government	Progress Party
6	Colonel Emmanuel Obeng Nyante (Eastern Regional Commissioner)	1972	1973	National Redemption Council	Military government
7	Lt. Col. George Minyila (Eastern Regional Commissioner)	1973	1975	National Redemption Council	Military government
8	Lt. Col. Kweku Adade Takyi (Eastern Regional Commissioner)	1975	October 1975	National Redemption Council	Military government
8	Lt. Col. Kweku Adade Takyi (Eastern Regional Commissioner)	October 1975	1977	Supreme Military Council	Military government
9	Commander G. E. Osei (Eastern Regional Commissioner)	1977	1978	Supreme Military Council	Military government
10	Lt. Colonel Obed Kwabena Abrefa (Eastern Regional Commissioner)	1978	June 1979	Supreme Military Council	Military government
11	S. H. Annancy	June 1979	September 1979	Armed Forces Revolutionary Council	Military government
12	F. K. B. Amoah	1979	Dec 1981	Limann government	People's National Party
13	Fred Ohene-Kena (Eastern Regional Secretary)	1982	?	Provisional National Defence Council	Military government
14	Daniel Ohene Agyekum (Eastern Regional Secretary)	1983	1986	Provisional National Defence Council	Military government
15	Kofi Acquaah Harrison (Eastern Regional Secretary)	1986	?	Provisional National Defence Council	Military government
16	Emmanuel Tetteh	1996	1997	Rawlings government	National Democratic Congress
17	Patience Addo	1997	?	Rawlings government	National Democratic Congress
18	S. K. Osafo Mensah	2001	2005	Kufuor government	New Patriotic Party
19	Yaw Barimah	2005	2007	Kufuor government	New Patriotic Party
20	Kwadwo Afram Asiedu	2007	January 2009	Kufuor government	New Patriotic Party
21	Samuel Ofosu-Ampofo	2009	2011	MIlls government	National Democratic Congress
22	Kwasi Akyem Apea-Kubi	2011	2012	MIlls government	National Democratic Congress
23	Victor Emmanuel Smith	2012	July 2012	MIlls government	National Democratic Congress
23	Victor Emmanuel Smith	July 2012	January 2013	Mahama government	National Democratic Congress
24	Julius Debrah	2013	March 2013	Mahama government	National Democratic Congress
25	Helen Ntoso	March 2013	July 2014	Mahama government	National Democratic Congress
26	Antwi Boasiako Sekyere	July 2014	January 2017	Mahama government	National Democratic Congress
27	Kwakye Darfour	February 2017	January 2025	Akufo-Addo government	New Patriotic Party
28	Rita Akosua Adjei Awatey	30 January 2025	Incumbent	Mahama Second Term	National Democratic Congress

== See also ==
- Ministers of the Ghanaian Government
- Eastern Region
