= Greater Accra Regional Minister =

The Greater Accra Regional Minister is the Ghana government official who is responsible for overseeing the administration of the Greater Accra Region of Ghana. The region was initially an administrative district within the Eastern Region of Ghana. The region was formally created by law in July 1982 by Provisional National Defence Council government through the Greater Accra Region Law (PNDCL 26) as a legally separate region. Currently, the southern boundary of the Greater Accra Region is the Atlantic Ocean. To the east is the Volta Region, Central Region to the west and the Eastern Region to the north. There are currently sixteen administrative regions in Ghana.

== List of Greater Accra Regional Ministers ==
Number	Minister	Took office	Left office	Government	Party
1	Paul Tagoe (MP) (Special Commissioner for Greater Accra)	August 1964	1965	Nkrumah government	Convention Peoples' Party
2	Henry Sonnie Torgbor Provencal (MP)	1965	February 1966	Nkrumah government	Convention Peoples' Party
3	Rear Admiral D. A. Hansen (Regional Administrative Committee Chairman)	1966	1967	National Liberation Council	Military government
4	J. G. Smith (Regional Administrative Committee Chairman)	1967	1969	National Liberation Council	Military government
5	A. S. O. Mensah (Regional Chief Executive)	1969	January 1972	Busia government	Progress Party
6	Colonel W. C. O. Acquaye-Nortey (Regional Commissioner)	14 January 1972	29 May 1973	National Redemption Council	Military government
7	Lt. Colonel P. K. D. Habadah (Regional Commissioner)	30 May 1973	9 October 1975	National Redemption Council	Military government
8	Lt. Colonel William Adjei Thompson (Regional Commissioner)	9 October 1975	1977	Supreme Military Council	Military government
9	Lt. Colonel L. K. Kodjiku (Regional Commissioner)	1977	1978	Supreme Military Council	Military government
10	Commander G. E. Osei (Regional Commissioner)	1978	June 1979	Supreme Military Council	Military government
11	E. R. K. Dwemoh (Regional Commissioner)	June 1979	September 1979	Armed Forces Revolutionary Council	Military government
12	I. T. Torto	c. 1980	31 December 1981	Limann government	People's National Party
13	Atukwei Okai (Regional Secretary)	1982	28 July 1982	Provisional National Defence Council	Military government
14	Amarkai Amarteifio (Regional Secretary)	28 July 1982	1985	Provisional National Defence Council	Military government
15	Col (rtd) William Adjei Thompson (Regional Secretary)	1985	1986	Provisional National Defence Council	Military government
16	Selina Taylor(Regional Secretary)	1986	1988	Provisional National Defence Council	Military government
17	Col (rtd) William Adjei Thompson (Regional Secretary)	April 1988	1991	Provisional National Defence Council	Military government
18	Nii Okaidja Adamafio (Regional Secretary)	1991	1993	Provisional National Defence Council	Military government
19	Mike Gizo (MP)	1993	1997	Rawlings government	National Democratic Congress
20	Joshua Alabi (MP)	1997	1998	Rawlings government	National Democratic Congress
21	Daniel Ohene Agyekum	1998	January 2000	Rawlings government	National Democratic Congress
22	Joshua Alabi (MP)	January 2000	January 2001	Rawlings government	National Democratic Congress
23	Sheikh I. C. Quaye	2001	January 2009	Kufuor government	New Patriotic Party
24	Nii Armah Ashitey (MP)	2009	July 2012	Mills government	National Democratic Congress
24	Nii Armah Ashitey (MP)	July 2012	January 2013	Mahama government	National Democratic Congress
25	Joshua Nii Laryea Afotey-Agbo (MP)	February 2013	March 2013	Mahama government	National Democratic Congress
26	Julius Debrah	March 2013	July 2014	Mahama government	National Democratic Congress
27	Joshua Nii Laryea Afotey-Agbo (MP)	May 2014	January 2017	Mahama government	National Democratic Congress
28	Ishmael Ashitey	February 2017	March 2021	Akufo-Addo government	New Patriotic Party
29	Henry Quartey (MP)	March 2021	14 February 2024	Akufo-Addo government	New Patriotic Party
30	Nii Kwartei Titus Glover (MP)	14 February 2024	6 January 2025	Akufo-Addo government	New Patriotic Party
31	Linda Obenewaa Akweley Ocloo	30 January 2025	Incumbent	Mahama government 2	National Democratic Congress

== See also ==
- Ministers of the Ghanaian Government
- Greater Accra Region
