= Operation Feed Yourself =

Ghanaian agricultural policy under the Acheampong government from 1972 to 1978

Operation Feed Yourself was an agricultural program administered in Ghana under military general and head-of-state Ignatius Kutu Acheampong. This policy was initiated in February 1972 and remained until the end of Acheampong's regime in 1978. Operation Feed Yourself aimed to increase levels of food crops produced in Ghana for domestic consumption. Ideologically, the program was an attempt toward self-sufficiency. Ultimately, Operation Feed Yourself failed to improve domestic food conditions in Ghana as local food crops remained scarce and price levels on these remained high.

== Background ==
=== Colonial background ===
Ghana became a recognized, independent country in 1957. Under the colonial rule of Great Britain, Ghana's agricultural structure was engineered to produce lucrative crops (palm oil in the 19th century and cocoa in the 20th century) for the profit of the British mainland. Because living conditions in Ghana were harsh on Europeans, settler-agriculture was not a significant presence and Ghanaian agriculture under British rule relied primarily on peasants. Peasant populations in Ghana willingly collaborated with a system of export-oriented agriculture in exchange for the compensation provided by British rule. As a result, Ghana's agricultural system leading up to Operation Feed Yourself was export-oriented and produced crops tailored for European rather than domestic tastes.

=== Kofi Busia regime (1969–72) ===
Kofi Abreba Busia's regime as Prime Minister immediately preceded the regime of Ignatius Kutu Acheampong and Operation Feed Yourself. Busia's removal from office at the hands of Acheampong was strongly motivated by Ghana's economic performance under Busia. Busia's regime produced a decline in per capita production and per capita income without a proposed plan in response. Busia was also heavily reliant on aid from western countries, characteristic which was despised by Acheampong who hinged his regime on self-reliance.

== Goals ==
The primary goal of Operation Feed Yourself was to increase the volume and diversity of agriculture intended for domestic consumption in Ghana. Specifically, the program's first "Five Year Plan" set as a goal of 6% annual growth in agricultural output. Ghana had produced an annual growth rate in agricultural output of 2.6% between 1969 and 1972. This growth in agriculture would also have significant effects on employment levels. The Acheampong government projected an increase of 0.8 million in the number of farmers nationwide by the year 1990. Additionally, the program projected a rise in GDP contributed by agriculture from 1,800 million cedis at the start of the program to 2,600 million cedis by 1990. Ideologically, the goal of Operation Feed Yourself was self-reliance, an uplift of Ghana by its own people.

== Program structure ==
=== Zones ===
With the intent to maximize crop production, Operation Feed Yourself divided Ghana's territory into 9 zones and assigned to each zone the production of the crops most profitably grown there. The zones and crop assignments were as follows:

Eastern Region: cassava, maize, plantains, sugarcane, tea, avocado, citrus, and yams.

Central region: maize, yams, cassava, plantain, rice, pineapple, and sugarcane.

Western Region: plantain, palm oil, bananas, rice, and coconut.

Ashanti Region: plantain, maize, soya bean, and yams.

Brong Ahafo: tomatoes, plantain, maize, yams, groundnuts, rice, and soya beans.

Greater Accra: maize, cassava, vegetables, rice, watermelons, and cashew.

Volta Region: cassava, rice, maize, and yams.

Northern and Upper Regions: yams, guinea corn, maize, groundnut, millet, and rice.

=== Administrative structure ===
Operation Feed Yourself was a program within Ghana's Ministry of Agriculture. The program's structure included components at the national and regional levels. At the national level, the principal agent leading Operation Feed Yourself was the Commissioner of Agriculture, who oversaw the entire program. Much of the program's implementation was carried out through the National Operations Committee, which was composed of departments specializing in food production and distribution: The Department of Agricultural Economy, the Department of Fisheries, the Seed Multiplication Unit, the Crop Production Unit and the Agricultural Mechanization Unit. The National Operations Committee had am important agent for the execution of its plans in the Program Control Executive, who issued all instructions within Operation Feed Yourself.

At the regional level, the principal position was the regional commissioner. There was one regional commissioner for each of the nine regions. Regional commissioners each led a Regional Agricultural Committee, which received directives from the National Operations Committee and the Program Control Executive. Underneath Regional Agricultural Committees were regional agricultural coordinators, who supervised the distribution of information to farmers at the regional level. The actual distributor of information and primary source of contact for farmers was the district agricultural officer.

=== Involved state production agencies ===
Additionally, the following state agencies were charged with actual production and distribution: State Farms Corporation, Food Production Corporation, Settlement Division, Food Distribution Corporation, Grains and Legumes Development Board, State Fishing Corporation, Cotton Development Board, and Pomazde Poultry Enterprise.

== Methods ==
=== Outreach ===
Operation Feed Yourself sought to increase the number of citizens working towards crop growth, and therefore, the Acheampong government made significant outreach efforts. These efforts included programming and propaganda on television and radio promoting agriculture. Additionally, the government employed its ties with institutions such as universities, the military, and prisons to encourage the creation of agricultural production units within each.

=== Government collectivization ===
The Acheampong government created a system for collecting, transporting, storing and trading crops within the country. The purposes of this system were to ensure the existence of a buyer for crops cultivated in rural areas, and to provide a means for these food products to reach urban areas. For example, agencies such as Meat Marketing Board, State Fishing Corporation and Food Distribution Corporation purchased crops from farmers and sold them at discounted prices to urban-dwellers.

=== Subsidized tools and tax exemptions ===
In an effort to motivate increased agricultural production, the government subsidized the price of seeds and fertilizers, as well as farming tools such as hoes and cutlasses. Additionally, the government removed taxes on the import of agricultural machinery. The government also provided tax exemptions for income from cocoa specifically, and more generally, for farms within their first five years of operation.

=== Loans from banks ===
Institutions such as the National Investment Bank and African Development Bank became involved with Operation Feed Yourself by providing credit for loans to a diverse array of Ghanaians. The AFB especially facilitated loans for non-farmers who were willing to become involved in agriculture, as well as owners of large parcels of farmable land. Initially, the AFB had stricter requirements for peasant farmers to receive loans, but eventually requirements for these were also lightened.

== Results ==
Operation Feed Yourself is considered a failure as the program began to falter by the mid-1970s. Signs of failure included general public discontent, a reduction in target acreage planted, domestic food products continuing to be expensive and the expansion of Ghana's budget deficit from 190 million cedis in 1972 to 807 million cedis in 1977. The number of urban residents who adopted agricultural enterprise also dwindled compared to the start of the program, likely due to perceived problems in infrastructure within the countryside (e.g. lack of access to clean drinking water, electricity and good roads). By 1977, intervention by International Food Aid was needed in order to mitigate food shortages in Ghana.

=== Problems with collectivization ===
Operation Feed Yourself intended to increase accessibility and affordability of domestic food crops and in order to achieve this, the government sought to collect crops from rural farms, store them and transport them into cities. These operations were met with obstacles such as inaccessibility to many farms for government vehicles caused by poor-quality roads, insufficient storage facilities or storage facilities lacking conditions for proper food preservation, and pricing policies and rates that were not properly researched or updated by agencies such as the Meat Marketing Board. The combination of these three factors resulted in large amounts of spoiled food items and prices on food crops that were unaffordable to the average worker.

=== Mismanagement of state funds and corruption ===
Operation Feed Yourself saw government subsidies and loans be granted to large-scale farmers especially. A significant issue became the use of these funds for personal expenditures instead of crop growth. Activities which mismanaged funds included paying off old debts and were identified by the African Development Bank as reason for discontinuing loans. Additionally, owners of large farms held close ties with bureaucratic actors (or sometimes personally held bureaucratic positions) and were able to benefit from resources at the government's disposal at much higher rates than peasants, who composed a large majority of the farming workforce.

=== Bureaucratic roadblocks ===
The organizational structure of Operation Feed Yourself included a large bureaucracy, and many bureaucratic bodies did not prioritize small-scale and peasant farmers in the distribution of farming resources aimed toward agricultural production. These conditions combined to create several bureaucratic roadblocks for small-scale farmers. These roadblocks included requirements for documentation of land ownership in order to receive a loan from the African Development Bank, which was difficult to obtain when much rural land in Ghana was communally owned and allocated by chiefs. There also existed acreage requirements for cultivatable lands in order to secure a loan. These requirements were accompanied by difficulties in obtaining documentation, which entailed travel to the capital city of Accra.

=== Premature reprioritization for export crops ===
Operation Feed Yourself also saw many farmers who received government benefits depart from crop production for domestic use towards export crops. These farmers justified their abandonment of domestic efforts for more lucrative export-oriented agriculture based on the Ghanaian government declaring Operation Feed Yourself a success after its first two years. Because large-scale farmers were prioritized for the distribution of state resources by the government over small-scale farmers, their abandonment of efforts to grow crops for domestic use left Ghana stranded during a time of food shortages.

== Legacy ==
On May 6, 2017, the President of the Ghana National Chamber of Commerce and Industry (NCCI) publicly suggested that the chamber consider reigniting Operation Feed Yourself a way to address food security issues as well as national employment levels. One year later, on October 3, 2017, the Ministry of Food and Agriculture published a plan for the implementation of a new program titled Planting for Food and Jobs (PFJ), a program inspired by Operation Feed Yourself.

Planting for Food and Jobs was created on a premise that foods such as maize, rice and sorghum are insufficiently produced in Ghana. Solutions that the program puts forth include government subsidies of high-quality seeds and fertilizers, education regarding effective farming practices, and the strengthening of connections between farmers and potential buyers of crops in both the public and private spheres. The program will cost the government US$717,548,101 over 4 years (2017–2020) and the structure is divided into a national, regional and district level.

== See also ==
- Economic history of Ghana
