= Emmanuel Samba Zumakpeh =

Ghanaian politician

Hon. Emmanuel Samba Zumakpeh

Member of the Ghana Parliament for Nadowli South
- In office 7 January 1993 – 6 January 2005
- Preceded by: None
- Succeeded by: Hon. Mathias Asoma Puozaa

Personal details
- Born: June 15, 1955 (age 71) Wa, Ghana
- Party: National Democratic Congress
- Education: Wa Training College, Tamale Secondary School, University of Ghana, McMaster University in Hamilton-Canada
- Profession: Politician, Teacher

Emmanuel Samba Zumakpeh (born June 15, 1955) is a Ghanaian politician and was the member of parliament for Nadowli South constituency in the Upper West Region of Ghana. He was a member of parliament in the 1st, 2nd, and 3rd parliaments of the 4th republic of Ghana.

== Early life and education ==
Mr. Zumakpeh was born on June 15, 1955, in Wa. He began his educational journey and completed middle school in 1971 with distinction. In the same year, he proceeded to Wa Teacher Training College to pursue a 4-year Teachers Certificate ‘A’ program.

In 1975, he took the General Certificate of Education (O-Level) as a private candidate and obtained a Division 1 grade. Just two weeks later, he sat for the Teachers Certificate ‘A’ examination and subsequently taught as a teacher for one year. From 1976 to 1978, Mr. Zumakpeh attended Tamale Secondary School, where he was awarded a GCE A Level certificate. That same year, in 1978, he gained admission to the University of Ghana to pursue a Bachelor of Arts degree. He graduated with a Second-Class Upper in 1981.

Seeking to further his education, he attended McMaster University in Hamilton, Canada, in 1991, where he was awarded a Master of Arts degree. In 2004, he returned to the University of Ghana to pursue an M.Phil. degree, which he completed in 2006.

Mr. Zumakpeh later returned to work for the Ghana Education Service, where he served as the Director of Education in several districts, a municipality and an entire region. These included the then Garu-Tempane District, Bongo District, Bawku Municipality, and the Bolgatanga Regional Education Directorate.

Currently, he holds the position of Director of Administration for the National Democratic Congress (NDC).

== Career ==
Zumakpeh is a teacher by profession. He is also a Ghanaian politician.

== Politics ==
Zumakpeh is a member of the National Democratic Congress. He was inaugurated into the first parliament of the fourth republic of Ghana on 7 January 1993 after he was elected unopposed in the 1992 Ghanaian parliamentary election held on 29 December 1992.

He was subsequently elected as the member of parliament for Nadwoli South constituency in the Upper West region in the 2nd and 3rd parliament of the 4th republic of Ghana.

=== 2000 General Elections ===
Zumakpeh was also elected as the member of parliament for the Nadwoli South constituency in the 2000 Ghanaian general elections. He was elected on the ticket of the National Democratic Congress. His constituency was a part of the 7 parliamentary seats out of 12 seats won by the National Democratic Congress in that election for the Upper West Region.

The National Democratic Congress won a minority total of 92 parliamentary seats out of 200 seats in the 3rd parliament of the 4th republic of Ghana. He was elected with 7,075 total valid votes cast. This was equivalent to 65.50% of the total valid votes cast. He was elected over Richard Dunee of the Peoples National Convention and Ye-Anyi Albert Dakura of the New Patriotic Party.

They obtained 2,603 and 1,129 respectively out of the total valid votes cast. These were equivalent to 24.10% and 10.40% respectively of total valid votes cast.

== Personal life ==
Zumakpeh is a Christian.
