= Minister for Local Government (Ghana) =

The Minister for Local Government in Ghana is responsible for decentralised administration of the country. This minister is also responsible for enhancing the development of the rural areas of Ghana. The title of the position has been altered under some governments to reflect this.

== List of ministers ==
Number	Minister	Took office	Left office	Government	Party
1	A. E. A. Ofori-Atta (MP) (Local Government and Justice)	6 March 1957		Nkrumah government	Convention People's Party
2	Kwaku Boateng (MP) (Interior and Local Government)	?	?	Nkrumah government	Convention People's Party
3	Mumuni Bawumia (MP)	1 February 1965	1966	Nkrumah government	Convention People's Party
4	Alex A. Y. Kyerematen (Commissioner for Local Government)	1966	1969	National Liberation Council	Military government
5	K. K. Anti (MP)	1969	1971	Busia government	Progress Party
6	Colonel Victor Coker-Appiah	1972	1972	National Redemption Council	Military government
7	Major General Nathan Aferi	1972	Oct 1975	National Redemption Council	Military government
8	Lt. Col. B. K. Ahlijah			Supreme Military Council	Military government
9	Lt. Col. K. A. Jackson			Supreme Military Council	Military government
10	C. K. Tedam	1978	1979	Supreme Military Council	Military government
11	Kofi Badu (Local Government and Sports)	Jun 1979	Jun 1979	Armed Forces Revolutionary Council	Military government
12	Nii Anyetei Kwakwranya	Jun 1979	Sep 1979	Armed Forces Revolutionary Council	Military government
13	Kwame Sanaa-Poku Jantuah	1979	1981	Limann government	People's National Party
14	John Agyekum Kufuor	1982	1982	Provisional National Defence Council	Military government
15	F. A. Jantuah	1984	1986	Provisional National Defence Council	Military government
16	William H. Yeboah	1987	1987	Provisional National Defence Council	Military government
17	Joyce Aryee	1987	1988	Provisional National Defence Council	Military government
18	Kwamena Ahwoi (Local Government and Rural Development)		1993	Provisional National Defence Council	Military government
18	Kwamena Ahwoi (Local Government and Rural Development)	1994		Rawlings government	National Democratic Congress
19	Cecilia Johnson (Local Government and Rural Development)		6 January 2001	Rawlings government	National Democratic Congress
20	Kwadwo Baah-Wiredu (Local Government and Rural Development)	2001	2003	Kufuor government	New Patriotic Party
21	Kwadwo Adjei-Darko (Local Government and Rural Development)	2003	2005	Kufuor government	New Patriotic Party
22	Charles Bimpong Bintim (Local Government and Rural Development)	2005	2006	Kufuor government	New Patriotic Party
23	Stephen Asamoah Boateng (Local Government and Rural Development and Environment)	2006	2007	Kufuor government	New Patriotic Party
24	Kwadwo Adjei-Darko	2007	6 January 2009	Kufuor government	New Patriotic Party
25	Joseph Yieleh Chireh (MP)	2009	2011	Mills government	National Democratic Congress
26	Samuel Ofosu-Ampofo	2011	2012	Mills government	National Democratic Congress
26	Samuel Ofosu-Ampofo	2012	2013	Mahama government	National Democratic Congress
27	Akwasi Oppong Fosu (MP) (Local Government and Rural Development)	2013	May 2014	Mahama government	National Democratic Congress
28	Julius Debrah (Local Government and Rural Development)	June 2014	February 2015	Mahama government	National Democratic Congress
29	Collins Dauda (MP) (Local Government and Rural Development)	February 2015	6 January 2017	Mahama government	National Democratic Congress
30	Alima Mahama (Minister for Local Government and Rural Development)	January 2017	incumbent	Akufo-Addo government	New Patriotic Party
31	Ahmed Ibrahim (MP) (Minister for Local Government, Chieftaincy and Religious Affairs)	25 January 2025	7 August 2026	Mahama's 2nd government	National Democratic Congress
32	Mahama Ayariga (MP)	29 August 2026	Incumbent	Mahama's 2nd government	National Democratic Congress
