= J. G. Smith =

Ghanaian politician

Chairman of the Greater Accra Regional Committee of Administration
- In office 1967–1969
- President: Joseph Arthur Ankrah
- Preceded by: David Animle Hansen
- Succeeded by: A. S. O. Mensah

Personal details
- Born: Gold Coast
- Citizenship: Ghanaian

J. G. Smith was a Ghanaian Civil servant, politician, and member of the National Liberation Council. He was the Chairman of the Greater Accra Regional Committee of Administration (Regional Minister) from 1967 to 1969.

Smith was then the deputy Commissioner for the Ghana Police Service and also deputy Chairman of the Accra Regional Committee of Administration (deputy Regional Minister) in 1966, prior to his appointment as the Chairman of the Greater Accra Regional Committee of Administration in 1967.
