= Kwakye Darfour =

Ghanaian politician

The Honourable Kwakye Darfour

Eastern Regional Minister
- Incumbent
- Assumed office February 2017
- President: Nana Akuffo-Addo
- Preceded by: Antwi Boasiako Sekyere

Personal details
- Born: Ghana
- Party: New Patriotic Party

Eric Kwakye Darfour (born 1957) is a Ghanaian politician and a member of the New Patriotic Party in Ghana. He is the Eastern Regional minister of Ghana. He was appointed by President Nana Addo Danquah Akuffo-Addo in January 2017 and was approved by the Members of Parliament in February 2017.

== Early life and education ==
He was born on the 29 September 1957 in Achimota Accra. He started his basic education at Obo Government School in Obo Kwahu his hometown. After his middle school certificate he processed to St. John Grammar School and Ofori Panin Senior High for his 'O' Level And 'A' Level respectively.

In 1981, Kwakye Darfour studied in the University of Dakar, Senegal for a higher diploma in French and later acquired BA (HONS) in French and Linguistics from University of Ghana, Legon.

== Political career ==
He was elected in 2012 Ghanaian general elections and re-elected in 2017 after obtaining 73.48% of votes cast.
