= Minister for Communications (Ghana) =

Cabinet portfolio in Ghana

Although the first minister was responsible for Communications, the designation has changed over the years. The position became combined with that of Transport for many years. Over the past decade, they have remained as separate ministries, each with its own minister of state.

== List of ministers ==
Number	Minister	Took office	Left office	Government	Party
1	Archie Casely-Hayford	6 March 1957		Nkrumah government	Convention People's Party
2	Krobo Edusei; Minister for Transport and Communications			Nkrumah government	Convention People's Party
3	Alfred Jonas Dowuona-Hammond	1964	February 1966	Nkrumah government	Convention People's Party
4	Matthew Poku	Feb 1968	Apr 1969	National Liberation Council	Military government
5	Harona Esseku; Minister for Transport and Communications	1969	1971	Busia government	Progress Party
6	Jatoe Kaleo; Minister for Transport and Communications	1971	1972	Busia government	Progress Party
7	Lt. Col. Anthony Selormey; Commissioner for Transport and Communications	1972		National Redemption Council	Military government
8	Colonel David A. Iddisah; Commissioner for Transport and Communications			Supreme Military Council	Military government
9	Group Captain T. T. Kutin; Commissioner for Transport and Communications			Supreme Military Council	Military government
10	Eric R.K. Dwemoh; Commissioner for Transport and Communications			Supreme Military Council	Military government
11	George Harlley; Commissioner for Transport and Communications	1979	1979	Armed Forces Revolutionary Council	Military government
12	Harry Sawyerr; Minister for Transport and Communications	1979	1981	Limann government	People's National Party
13	Mahama Iddrisu; Secretary for Transport and Communications	1983	1987	Provisional National Defence Council	Military government
14	Yaw Donkor; Secretary for Transport and Communications	1987	1992	Provisional National Defence Council	Military government
15	Kwame Peprah; Secretary for Transport and Communications	1992	1993	Provisional National Defence Council	Military government
16	Edward Salia; Minister for Transport and Communications	1993	1995	Rawlings government	National Democratic Congress
17	Ekwow Spio-Garbrah		1998	Rawlings government	National Democratic Congress
18	John Mahama	1998	2001	Rawlings government	National Democratic Congress
19	Felix Owusu-Adjapong; Minister for Transport and Communications	2001	2003	Kufuor government	New Patriotic Party
20	Albert Kan Dapaah	2003	2006	Kufuor government	New Patriotic Party
21	Mike Oquaye	2006	2007	Kufuor government	New Patriotic Party
22	Dr. Ben Aggrey Ntim	2007	2009	Kufuor government	New Patriotic Party
23	Haruna Iddrisu	2009	2012	Mills government	National Democratic Congress
23	Haruna Iddrisu	2012	2013	Mahama government	National Democratic Congress
24	Edward Omane Boamah	2013	2017	Mahama government	National Democratic Congress
25	Ursula Owusu-Ekuful	2017	2025	Nana Akufo-Addo 's govrernment	New Patriotic Party
26	Sam Nartey George	2025	Incumbent	John Dramani Mahama's government	National Democratic Congress (Ghana)

== See also ==
- Minister for Transport (Ghana)
