= W. C. O. Acquaye-Nortey =

Ghanaian soldier and politician (born 1930)

William Codjoe Omaboe Acquaye-Nortey

Regional Commissioner for the Western Region
- In office 1 September 1975 – 9 October 1975
- President: Ignatius Kutu Acheampong
- Preceded by: George Minyila
- Succeeded by: Michael Ofori-Akuamoah

Regional Commissioner for the Upper Region
- In office 30 May 1973 – 30 August 1975
- President: Ignatius Kutu Acheampong
- Preceded by: J. A. Kyeremeh
- Succeeded by: Michael Ofori-Akuamoah

Regional Commissioner for Greater Accra
- In office 14 January 1972 – 29 May 1973
- President: Ignatius Kutu Acheampong
- Preceded by: A. S. O. Mensah
- Succeeded by: P. K. D. Habadah

Personal details
- Born: William Codjoe Omaboe Acquaye-Nortey; 1 April 1930 Accra, Gold Coast
- Citizenship: Ghanaian
- Education: Accra Academy

William Codjoe Omaboe Acquaye-Nortey (born 1 April 1930) was a Ghanaian soldier and politician. He served as the Greater Accra Regional Minister from 1972 to 1973, the Upper Regional Minister (now Upper East Region and Upper West Region) from 1973 to 1975, and the Western Regional Minister from September 1975 to October 1975.

== Early life and education ==
Acquaye-Nortey was born on 1 April 1930 in Accra. He began schooling at Bishop's Boys' School in Accra in 1935 and later moved to Government School in Kibi, where he studies from 1940 to 1942. A year later, he enrolled at Government School in Accra where he completed his elementary education in 1944. In 1945, he was admitted into the Accra Academy for his secondary education, where he graduated in 1948. Acquaye-Nortey entered Eaton Hall Officer Cadet School in Chester in 1957 for a year long course, and the Royal Army Service Corps, Aldershot, England, for another year long course in Long Transport from April 1963 to April 1964. In 1971, he enrolled at the Joint Services Staff College in Latimer, England, for an eight-month course spanning from January 1971 to August 1971.

== Career ==
Following his secondary education, Acquaye-Nortey enlisted into the Gold Coast Regiment in February 1949. He was then posted to the 19 Command Supply Depot of the West African Army Services Corps. In 1953, he was promoted to the rank of a sergeant, and worked as a training officer from 1953 to 1961. While working as a training officer, he was commissioned a lieutenant in March 1958. From 1961 to 1962, he was the commanding officer of the Mechanical Transport Company of the Ghana Army Supplies and Transport Services. He was later made commanding officer of the Military Hospital of the Ghana Army Medical Services until 1963. A year later, he was made director of the Ghana Armed Forces Supplies and Transport Services. He worked in this capacity until 1972.

In 1966 when the National Liberation Council government took over from the Nkrumah government, he was made chairman of council's Logistics Committee. He served in that capacity until 1969. He was also made chairman of the Board of Directors of the State Transport Corporation from 1966 to 1970. From 1967 to 1969, he doubled as the chairman of the Central Road Transport Advisory Council.

Following the inception of the Acheampong regime, Acquaye-Nortey was appointed executive chairman of the Accra Tema City Council, he served in this capacity until November 1972. He doubled as the Regional Commissioner for the Greater Accra from 14 January 1972 until 29 May 1973. He was appointed Regional Commissioner for Upper Region on 30 May 1975 and he remained in this post until 30 August 1975. He was later made Regional Commissioner for the Western Region on 1 September 1975, he served in this capacity until October 1975 when he was retired.

== Personal life ==
Acquaye-Nortey married Caroline Nerteley Nettey in 1953. Together, they had two daughters and three sons. His hobbies included golfing.
