= Kwabena Kwakye Anti =

Ghanaian politician

Member of the Ghana Parliament for Birim-Anafo
- In office 1969–1972

Minister for Local Government
- In office 1969–1971
- President: Edward Akufo-Addo
- Prime Minister: Kofi Abrefa Busia
- Preceded by: Alex A. Y. Kyerematen
- Succeeded by: Nathan Apea Aferi

Personal details
- Born: Kwabena Kwakye Anti; 23 November 1923 Akim Awisa, Gold Coast
- Education: Mfantsipim School; Achimota School; Leeds University; University of Colorado

Kwabena Kwakye Anti was a lecturer and a Ghanaian politician. He was a minister of state in the Second Republic of Ghana.

== Early life and education ==
Kwabena was born on 23 November 1923 at Akim Awisa near Akim Oda in the Eastern Region. He died on June 13, 1983.

His early formative years began at Awisa Presbyterian School and Saltpond English Church Mission School where he completed in 1937. He had his secondary education at Mfantsipim School from 1939 to 1943 and Achimota School from 1945 to 1946. In 1950 he enrolled at University of Leeds and graduated in 1954 with a bachelor of Commerce with emphasis on Local Government. In 1959, he enrolled at the University of Colorado graduating with a master of business administration in 1960.

== Career ==
He taught at the Kumasi University of Science and Technology between 1954 and 1959. On his return he worked at the Development Secretariat and rose to the rank of Chief Industrial Promotions Officer.

== Politics ==
During the Second Republic of Ghana, from 1969 to 1972 he was elected member of parliament for Birim-Anafo. He was appointed Minister for Local Government from 1969 until 1971.

== Personal life ==
He was married with four children.

== See also ==
- Busia government
- Minister for Local Government (Ghana)
- Obituary and dead
