= Philemon Quaye =

Ghanaian diplomat (1924–2010)

Philemon F. Quay
- Born: 1924
- Occupation: diplomat
- Employer: a senior officer in the Ghana Army

Commodore Philemon F. Quaye (1924 – 29 August 2010) was a Ghanaian naval personnel, politician, diplomat and religious leader. He served as Chief of the Naval Staff of the Ghana Navy and as a senior officer in the Ghana Army as well. He served as Chief of Naval Staff of the Ghana Navy from 1 April 1969 to 15 May 1972. He was once Scripture Union International Council chairman. He was also active with World Vision International in Ghana and elsewhere.

== See also ==
- Ghana Navy

Military offices
Preceded by Air Vice Marshal Michael A. Otu	Chief of Naval Staff; September 1961 – June 1967	Succeeded by Commander Joy Amedume
