= Roger Joseph Felli =

Ghanaian soldier and politician

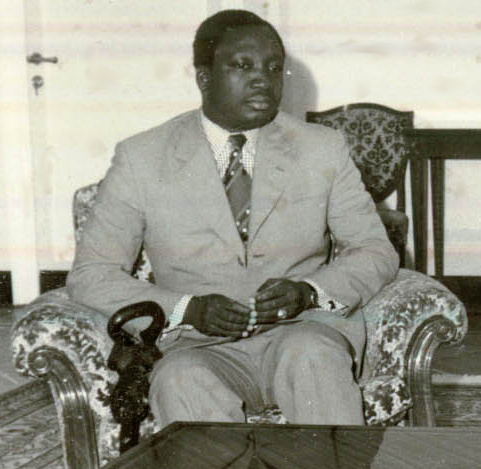

18th Minister for Foreign Affairs (Ghana)
- In office 1975 – June 1979
- President: Kutu Acheampong
- Preceded by: Kwame Baah
- Succeeded by: Gloria Amon Nikoi

Personal details
- Born: May 2, 1941 Navrongo
- Died: June 26, 1979 (aged 38) Accra
- Resting place: Navrongo
- Profession: Soldier, politician

Military service
- Allegiance: Ghana
- Branch/service: Ghana Army
- Years of service: 1963 – 1979
- Rank: Colonel

Colonel Roger Joseph Atogetipoli Felli (May 2, 1941 – June 26, 1979) was a soldier and politician who was once the foreign minister of Ghana.

Roger Felli was born at Navrongo, the capital of the Kassena-Nankana District in the Upper East Region of Ghana.

== Military ==
He was commissioned as a lieutenant in the Ghana army in 1963. He rose through the ranks after attending courses in Ghana and the United Kingdom.

== Politics ==
After the overthrow of Dr. Kofi Abrefa Busia's Progress Party government on January 13, 1972, the then Major Felli became a member of the ruling National Redemption Council led by General (then Colonel) Ignatius Kutu Acheampong. He was appointed the Commissioner for the Works and Housing Ministry in the new government. He later also held the portfolios of the Trade and Industry Ministry and the Finance and Economic Planning Ministry respectively. Colonel (then Major) Roger Felli was appointed Minister of Foreign Affairs in 1975. He held this position till the coup d'état of June 4, 1979 which brought the Armed Forces Revolutionary Council (AFRC) led by Flt. Lt. Jerry Rawlings to power.

== Execution ==
Colonel Roger Felli was one of six senior military officers who had previously served in government, executed by firing squad at the Teshie Military Range at Teshie, at the outskirts of Accra. The executions were ordered by the AFRC and carried out on June 26, 1979. The other officers executed with him were two former heads of state of Ghana, Gen Fred Akuffo and Lt Gen Akwasi Afrifa and three other military officers, namely Air Vice Marshal Boakye, Maj. Gen R.E.A. Kotei and Rear Admiral Joy Amedume. They were buried in unmarked graves at Adoagyiri near Nsawam in the Eastern Region of Ghana.

== Reburial at Navrongo ==
On December 27, 2001, the remains of Col. Roger Felli, along with the remains of the five executed with him and two executed a few days earlier were handed over to their families at a ceremony at the Garrison Methodist and Presbyterian Church in Accra. Raphael Felli, a US-based attorney and nephew of Colonel Felli, is reported to have said "We're very upset, very angry, ... But our success is our revenge." His younger brother, Joe Felli, is reported to have demanded in a tribute, that relatives and sympathisers had the right to know what happened before his brother and the other seven senior officers brother were executed. He is also reported to have said that the spirit behind the Ghana's motto "Freedom and Justice" was still a guiding principle in the conduct of the nation's domestic affairs. He is reported to have said in addition that;

"We have the right to know what happened, as a nation, we must ensure that never again will we allow such acts and utter disrespect for the sanctity of life to recur in our country." He said the only lasting legacy that Ghanaians could bequeath to the memory of Roger Felli and his colleagues was to rededicate and recommit our selves "to the defence of, the rule of law, the defence of our constitution, even at the peril of our lives."

He was reburied at Navrongo, his hometown, after traditional and Catholic rites.

== See also ==
- National Redemption Council
- Supreme Military Council, Ghana
- Minister for Foreign Affairs (Ghana)

Political offices
Preceded by S.W. Awuku Darko; Minister for Works	Minister for Works and Housing; 1972	Succeeded by Colonel Victor Coker Appiah
Preceded by Dr. William Godson Bruce-Konuah; Minister for Housing	Minister for Works and Housing; 1972	Succeeded by Colonel Victor Coker Appiah
Preceded by ?	Minister for Trade and Industry; 1972 – 1975	Succeeded by Colonel K.E. Quarshie; Minister for Trade and Tourism
Preceded by ?	Minister for Finance and Economic Planning; 1years=? – ?	Succeeded by ?
Preceded by Col. Kwame Baah	Foreign Minister; 1975 – 1979	Succeeded by Gloria Amon Nikoi
