= Supreme Military Council (Ghana) =

Military government of Ghana (1975–1979)

Overview
- Established: 9 October 1975
- Dissolved: 4 June 1979
- State: Ghana
- Leader: Chairman (Ignatius Kutu Acheampong)
- Headquarters: Accra

The Supreme Military Council (SMC) was the ruling government of Ghana from 9 October 1975 to 4 June 1979. Its chairman was Colonel I.K. Acheampong. He was also the Head of state of Ghana due to his chairmanship.

== SMC I and II ==
The period of the SMC can be divided into two eras. These are :

- Acheampong era - SMC - 1 (October 9, 1975 - July 5, 1978)
- Akuffo era - SMC 2 - (July 5, 1978 - June 4, 1979)

== Formation of the Supreme Military Council ==
On 9 October 1975, the National Redemption Council was replaced by the Supreme Military Council. Its composition consisted of Acheampong, the chairman, and the others including all the military service commanders such as Lt. Gen. Akuffo the Chief of Defence Staff, and the army, navy, air force and Border Guards commanders respectively. Some officers were promoted, some changed portfolios and many others were dropped. The Commanders of the First and Second Infantry Brigades of the Ghana Army were also included. It is thought that this coup removed Agbo, Baah and Selormey whom Acheampong had begun to see as a threat. It also made the various service commanders in charge of both the military and the state as there had been some tensions between relatively junior officers in government and the senior commanders of the Armed Forces.

== Union government ==
Acheampong introduced the Union Government concept which will see both the military and civilians involved in government. An ad hoc committee was set up under the Attorney General of Ghana, Gustav Koranteng-Addow to come up with a plan. The Koranteng-Addow committee reported after collating views from around the country that the people of Ghana wanted

"a form of representative government of the people, having as its philosophical foundation the concepts of national unity and consensus, and selecting its functionaries from all levels and sections of the community on a basis other than membership of an institutionalised political party or parties".

It also advocated for an Executive President and Vice President and a single legislative chamber to be elected by universal adult suffrage. It also suggested a Council of State comprising the Chief of Defence Staff, the Inspector General of Police and representatives of the House of Chiefs. There was some opposition to this concept. It was put to a national referendum on 30 March 1978. One person who voiced concerns about the plans of the government was Lt. Gen. Akwasi Afrifa who was the Head of state of Ghana and Chairman of the National Liberation Council between 1967 and 1969. He stated in a letter to Acheampong and published in the Daily Graphic newspaper of 1 February 1978 among others that

...I feel greatly disturbed about the future after your government... ...In order to discourage the military from staging coups in the future, how about if they line all of us up and shoot us one by one? ... I do not certainly want to be arrested, given some sort of trial and shot. These are genuine fears. All members of the N.L.C., including Gen. Joseph Ankrah, are involved. I still have no regrets whatsoever about my part in the operations of 1966. My fears even increase when I look at the Koranteng-Addow Report as a whole. I do not like the Union Government as proposed in the report. The political forces militating against it are too strong. ... I do not see how I can be SECURE in the Union Government. I do not also see how you yourself can be secure in that government....

The SMC went on to organise the Union Government referendum on 30 March 1978. The SMC's union government won the referendum. The Electoral Commission Commissioner, Justice I. K. Abban went into hiding for his own safety. Four days later, he was accompanied by the Catholic Archbishop of Cape Coast, John Kodwo Amissah and Hilary Senoo of the Catholic Secretariat and the Rev. M. C. Awotwe Pratt of the Methodist Church. Acheampong assured Abban that he had nothing against him and that he could go back to the bench.

== Opposition ==
In November 1975, J. H. Mensah, Finance Minister in the Busia government was jailed by an Accra Special Court together with Kwame Karikari, a former private secretary of Busia and I. C. Quaye, a former Progress Party MP for Ayawaso between 1969 and 1972 for publishing material against the SMC. In September 1976, the Ghana Bar Association asked the SMC to abolish the military tribunals in the country and also to initiate steps towards returning the country to civilian rule. Groups which had campaigned against Union government, including the People's Movement for Freedom and Justice (PMFJ), The Third Force and the Front for Prevention of Dictatorship were banned shortly after the referendum. The PMFJ was formed in January 1978 and led by Komla Gbedemah, Akwasi Afrifa and William Ofori Atta. Gbedemah, Ofori Atta, Victor Owusu, John Bilson and Adu Boahen were placed in detention. Others opposed to union government and the SMC went into exile. Opposition and discontent within the military and the general population continued throughout 1978. At the start of the Union government project, two officers who raised concerns were removed. They were Rear Admiral C. K. Dzang, Navy commander and Brigadier Joseph Nunoo-Mensah.

== Palace coup ==
There had been growing tension within the military as with the worsening economic situation and the aftermath of the referendum that was widely believed to be rigged, many soldiers felt that the reputation of the military was being tarnished by politics and that the military had to return to barracks. Some senior officers in the SMC tried to raise this issue but Acheampong blamed the military hierarchy for loss of military prestige. Akuffo initiated a plot to replace Acheampong under the pretext of the meetings of the Military Advisory Council and it ended with Rear Admiral Amedume chairing a meeting where senior officers agreed for the need for the withdrawal of the military from government. The meeting moved to the residence of Acheampong where Akuffo read a speech informing Acheampong that the armed forces wanted him to step down. He was forced to sign a resignation letter after being convinced that he no more had the support of his colleagues. On 5 July 1978, it was announced to the nation that Acheampong had resigned as chairman of the SMC and had also voluntarily retired from the Ghana Armed Forces. This was done apparently in the interest of the nation. He was replaced by Lt. Gen. Akuffo who was the Chief of Defence Staff. Major General R. E. A. Kotei, the Army Commander became the new Chief of Defence Staff. Brigadier N. A. Odartey-Wellington was promoted to major general and made the new army commander. Colonel I. K. Amoah replaced Odartey-Wellington as commander of the First Infantry Brigade, thus becoming a member of the NRC. Brigadier Joseph Nunoo-Mensah, chief of staff at the Ministry of Defence was also made a member of the NRC.

== 15 May 1979 mutiny ==
Towards the end of the SMC2 era, discontent had led to a national strike by nurses. Lower ranks in the army also felt disillusioned about pay and were convinced that resources meant for them were being siphoned off by corrupt senior officers. There was a growing feeling that these officers should not be allowed to return to the barracks without being punished for the ill-gotten gains. There were apparently multiple coup plots but the first to act was that led by FLight Lt. Jerry Rawlings, an Air Force officer who was charismatic and very popular with his enlisted men. On 15 May 1979, he initiated the mutiny. They held a number of hostages at the air force base. He and his colleagues were surrounded by the armoured regiment led by Major Abubakar Sulemana, their commander and subsequently arrested. The public prosecutor during their trial was G. E. K. Aikins. His remarks were critical of military rule in Ghana and painted Rawlings as "an idealist motivated by nationalism and a concern for the poor". This gave Rawlings positive publicity both in the army and among the general public.

== Overthrow of the SMC ==
An alternative coup plot by a group known as the Free Africa Movement involved junior officers and other ranks. They were planning for a coup for a much later date. Their leader was Major Boakye-Djan of the Fifth Infantry Battalion. One of his team, Corporal Peter Tasiri, initiated the plot for a coup. He was arrested together with Lt. Baah Achamfuor, whom they had tried to recruit. Some of his colleagues who managed to avoid arrest arranged a jail break to release Rawlings and his colleagues. A guard and one of the conspirators were reportedly killed at this stage. Rawlings was released and announced the coup but there appeared to be a lot of confusion as there was no clear leadership for the coup attempt throughout the day. Captain Henry Smith of the First Infantry Battalion helped with ammunition. One of the SMC members, the Army Commander Major General Odartey-Wellington led the effort to stop the mutiny. He announced at one stage that the coup had been quelled and requested a meeting with Rawlings. He was however killed later in a gun battle at the Nima Police Station which he was using temporarily as his base. In the evening, Lieutenant General Joshua Hamidu, the Chief of Defence Staff announced that the SMC government had been overthrown.

== Members of the Acheampong government (SMC 1) ==
The council consisted of the Head of state and all service commanders of the Ghana Armed Forces. The head of the police was also included. Many members of the government changed portfolios while others were dropped.

=== SMC I members (October 1975 to July 1978) ===
| Office | Name | Start | End |
| Head of state and Chairman | Colonel Ignatius Kutu Acheampong(General on 7 March 1976) | 9 October 1975 | 5 July 1978 |
| Chief of the Defence Staff | Major General Lawrence Okai (later Lieutenant General) | 9 October 1975 | November 1976 |
| Chief of the Defence Staff | Lieutenant General Fred W. K. Akuffo | November 1976 | July 1978 |
| Chief of Army Staff | Brigadier Fred W. K. Akuffo (later Lieutenant General) | 9 October 1975 | November 1976 |
| Chief of Army Staff | Major General Robert E. A. Kotei | November 1976 | 5 July 1978 |
| Chief of Naval Staff | Captain C. K. Dzang (later Rear Admiral) | 9 October 1975 | June 1977 |
| Chief of Naval Staff | Rear Admiral Joy Amedume | June 1977 | July 1978 |
| Chief of Air Staff | Brigadier Charles Beausoliel | 9 October 1975 | 11 November 1976 |
| Chief of Air Staff | Air Vice Marshal George Yaw Boakye | 12 November 1976 | 5 July 1978 |
| Border Guards Commander | Colonel E. K. Utuka (later Major General ) | 9 October 1975 | ? |
| Inspector General of Police | Ernest Ako | 9 October 1975 | July 1978 |

== The reconstituted National Redemption Council ==
The various commissioners were designated as members of the reconstituted National Redemption Council (NRC) as membership of the SMC was now limited to the Head of State, the Inspector General of Police and the various military service commanders and the Border Guards commander only. The Commanders of the First and Second Infantry Brigades were also included in the NRC under the SMC. Eleven members of the NRC government including E. N. Moore who had been present since January 1972 as well as various ten other military officers were dropped.

=== Military commanders (NRC members) ===
| Office | Name | Start | End |
| First Infantry Brigade Commander | Colonel N. A. Odartey-Wellington (later Major General) | 9 October 1975 | ? |
| First Infantry Brigade Commander | Colonel I. K. Amoah | 5 July 1978 | ? |
| Second Infantry Brigade Commander | | | |
| Chief of Staff, Ministry of Defence | Brigadier Nunoo-Mensah | 5 July 1978 | ? |
=== List of commissioners (NRC members) ===
| Office | Name | Start | End |
| Commissioner for Foreign Affairs | Colonel Roger Felli | 9 October 1975 | ? |
| Commissioner for Internal Affairs; Inspector General of Police | Ernest Ako | 9 October 1975 | July 1978 |
| Commissioner for Internal Affairs; Inspector General of Police | B. S. K. Kwakye | July 1978 | June 1979 |
| Commissioner for Defence | Colonel Kutu Acheampong | 9 October 1975 | July 1978 |
| Commissioner for Defence | Lt. General Fred W. K. Akuffo | July 1978 | June 1979 |
| Attorney-General and Commissioner for Justice | Gustav Koranteng-Addow | 9 October 1975 | January 1979 |
| Commissioner for Finance and Economic Affairs | Colonel Kutu Acheampong | 9 October 1975 | ? |
| Commissioner for Finance and Economic Affairs | Robert Gardiner | 14 October 1975 | May 1978 |
| Commissioner for Finance and Economic Affairs | Colonel E. T. Oklah | 1978 | July 1979 |
| Commissioner for Economic Planning | Lt Col. Kwame Baah | 9 October 1975 | ? |
| Commissioner for Economic Planning | J. L. S. Abbey | 1978 | July 1979 |
| Commissioner for Local Government | Lt. Col. K. B. Agbo | 9 October 1975 | 1975 |
| Commissioner for Local Government | Lt. Col. B. K. Ahlijah | ? | ? |
| Commissioner for Local Government | Lt. Col. K. A. Jackson | ? | ? |
| Commissioner for Local Government | C. K. Tedam | c. 1978 | |
| Commissioner for Agriculture | Lt. Col. Paul K. Nkegbe | 9 October 1975 | 1979 |
| Commissioner for Agriculture | Major General N. A. Odartey-Wellington | 1978 | 1978 |
| Commissioner for Agriculture | Colonel Samuel Akwagiram | 1978 | 1979 |
| Commissioner for Health | Lt. Colonel Anthony Selormey | 9 October 1975 | 14 October 1975 |
| Commissioner for Health | Major General N. A. Odartey-Wellington | 14 October 1975 | |
| Commissioner for Health | Abayifa Karbo | July 1977 | November 1978 |
| Commissioner for Labour, Social Welfare and Co-operatives | Commander Joy Amedume | 9 October 1975 | ? |
| Commissioner for Labour, Social Welfare and Co-operatives | Nii Anyetei Kwakwranya | c. 1978 | |
| Commissioner for Lands and Mineral Resources | Group Captain T. T. Kutin | 9 October 1975 | ? |
| Commissioner for Lands and Mineral Resources | Brigadier K. Osei-Boateng | ? | |
| Commissioner for Lands and Mineral Resources | Lt. Col. Abdulai Ibrahim | ? | |
| Commissioner for Lands and Mineral Resources | George Benneh | c. 1978 | |
| Commissioner for Industry | Colonel George Minyila | 9 October 1975 | ? |
| Commissioner for Industry | Colonel B. K. Ahlijah | c. 1978 | |
| Commissioner for Works and Housing | Lt. Col. K. A. Jackson | 9 October 1975 | ? |
| Commissioner for Works and Housing | Major Edward Yirimambo | c. 1978 | |
| Commissioner for Trade and Tourism | Colonel K. A. Quashie | 9 October 1975 | ? |
| Commissioner for Transport and Communications | Colonel David A. Iddisah | 9 October 1975 | ? |
| Commissioner for Transport and Communications | Group Captain T. T. Kutin | | |
| Commissioner for Transport and Communications | Eric R.K. Dwemoh | | |
| Commissioner for Transport and Communications | George Harlley | c. 1978 | |
| Commissioner for Education and Culture | Ellis Owusu-Fordwor | 9 October 1975 | 1979 |
| Commissioner for Education, Culture and Sports | Lieutenant-Colonel Paul Nkegbe | 9 October 1975 | ? |
| Commissioner for Information | Brigadier Robert E. A. Kotei | 9 October 1975 | November 1976 |
| Commissioner for Information | Colonel Parker H. S. Yarney | c. 1978 | |
| Commissioner for Sports | Colonel Kutu Acheampong | 9 October 1975 | 1978 |
| Commissioner for Sports | E. R. K. Dwemoh | c. 1978 | |
| Commissioner for Cocoa Affairs | Captain J. A. Kyeremeh | 9 October 1975 | 1979 |
| Commissioner for Cooperatives and Consumer Affairs | Kofi Badu | c. 1978 | |
| Commissioner for Fuel and Power | Lieutenant-Colonel Abdulai Ibrahim | | |
| Commissioner for Chieftaincy Affairs | Lt. General Fred W. K. Akuffo | c. 1978 | |
| Commissioner for NRC Affairs | E. K. Buckman | | |
| Commissioner and Special Advisor to the Head of State | Joe Appiah | | |
| Commissioner for Special Duties | Lt. Colonel C. S. C. Grant | c. 1978 | |
=== Regional Commissioners ===
| Ashanti Regional Commissioner | Major L. K. Kodjiku | October 1975 | 1977 |
| Ashanti Regional Commissioner | Commander G. E. Osei | 1977 | 1978 |
| Ashanti Regional Commissioner | Colonel R. K. Zumah | 1978 | 1979 |
| Brong Ahafo Region | Lt. Col. O. K. Abrefa | October 1975 | 1977 |
| Brong Ahafo Region | William Adjei Thompson | 1977 | 1978 |
| Brong Ahafo Region | R. K. Zumah | July 1978 | October 1978 |
| Brong Ahafo Region | Lt. Commander L. K. Awuku | October 1978 | 1979 |
| Central Regional Commissioner | Major J. A. Awuni | 1975 | 1977 |
| Central Regional Commissioner | Commander John A. K. Otoo | 1977 | 1978 |
| Central Regional Commissioner | Lt Colonel William Adjei Thompson | 1978 | 1979 |
| Eastern Regional Commissioner | Colonel Kweku Adade Takyi | 9 October 1975 | 1977 |
| Eastern Regional Commissioner | Lt. Col. George Minyila | 1973 | 1975 |
| Eastern Regional Commissioner | Commander G. E. Osei | 1977 | 1978 |
| Eastern Regional Commissioner | Lt. Colonel Obed Kwabena Abrefa | 1978 | 1979 |
| Greater Accra Regional Commissioner | Lt. Col. William Adjei Thompson | 9 October 1975 | 1977 |
| Greater Accra Regional Commissioner | Lt. Colonel L. K. Kodjiku | 1977 | 1978 |
| Greater Accra Regional Commissioner | Commander G. E. Osei | 1978 | 1979 |
| Northern Regional Commissioner | Major R. K. Zumah | 9 October 1975 | 1978 |
| Northern Regional Commissioner | Lt. Colonel L. K. Kodjiku | 1978 | 1979 |
| Upper Region | Lt. Col. Michael Ofori-Akuamoah | 9 October 1975 | 1978 |
| Upper Region | Lt. Colonel Samuel Gyabaah | 1978 | 1979 |
| Volta Regional Commissioner | Lt. Col. G. K. Amevor | 9 October 1975 | 1979 |
| Western Region | Lt.Commander John A.K. Otoo | 1975 | 1976 |
| Western Region | Lt. Col. E. J. Dawuni | 1976 | 1977 |
| Western Region | J. S. Y. Amenlemah | 1978 | 1979 |

| Office | Name | Dates | Notes |
|---|---|---|---|
| Secretary to the Cabinet | Gilbert Boafo Boahene | 1978-1979 | |

== Members of Akuffo government (SMC 2) ==
Following a bloodless palace coup on 5 July 1978, the SMC was reconstituted. General Acheampng was forced to resign as head of state and placed under house arrest. This government remained in power until its overthrow eleven months later by the Armed Forces Revolutionary Council on 4 June 1979.

=== SMC II members (July 1978 to June 1979) ===
| Office | Name | Start | End |
| Head of state and Chairman | Lieutenant General Fred W. K. Akuffo | 5 July 1978 | 4 June 1979 |
| Chief of the Defence Staff | Major General Robert E. A. Kotei | 5 July 1978 | 23 July 1978 |
| Chief of the Defence Staff | Lieutenant General Joshua Hamidu | 23 July 1978 | 4 June 1979 |
| Chief of Army Staff | Major General Neville Odartey-Wellington | 5 July 1978 | 4 June 1979 |
| Chief of Naval Staff | Rear Admiral Joy Kobla Amedume | 5 July 1978 | 4 June 1979 |
| Chief of Air Staff | Air Vice Marshal George Yaw Boakye | 5 July 1978 | 4 June 1979 |
| Border Guards Commander | Major General E. K. Utuka | 5 July 1978 | 1978 |
| Border Guards Commander | Major General K. Osei Boateng | 1978 | 4 June 1979 |
| Inspector General of Police | Ernest Ako | July 1978 | July 1978 |
| Inspector General of Police | B. S. K. Kwakye | 17 July 1978 | 4 June 1979 |

| Preceded by National Redemption Council (1972-1975) | Governments of Ghana (Military Regime); 1975–1979 | Succeeded by Armed Forces Revolutionary Council (1979) |

Monday 4 June 1979

== Sources ==
- Some of the information here was originally on the German Wikipedia.

== External sources ==
- Past General Officers Commanding /chiefs of the Defence Staff
- Past Army Commanders / Chiefs of Army Staff
- Past Chiefs of Naval Staff 1959 - 2000
- Past Chiefs of Air Staff

| Preceded by National Redemption Council (1972–1975) | Government of Ghana (Military Regime); October 1975 – June 1979 | Succeeded by Armed Forces Revolutionary Council (1979) |
