= Nathan Apea Aferi =

Ghanaian army general and politician (1922–2003)

16th Minister for Foreign Affairs (Ghana)
- In office 1972–1972
- President: Kutu Acheampong
- Preceded by: William Ofori Atta
- Succeeded by: Lt. Colonel Kwame Baah

Personal details
- Born: 21 September 1922 Mampong-Akuapim
- Died: 8 April 2003 (aged 80) Accra, Ghana
- Profession: Soldier

Military service
- Allegiance: Ghana
- Branch/service: Ghana Army
- Rank: Major General
- Commands: Chief of the Defence Staff

Major General Nathan Apea Aferi (21 September 1922 – 8 April 2003) was a soldier and politician in Ghana. He was a Chief of the Defence Staff of Ghana. He also served briefly as Foreign Minister of Ghana.

== Career ==
=== Congo ===
Aferi served with the United Nations Operation in the Congo now the Democratic Republic of Congo. At the time, he was a lieutenant colonel in the Ghana army. He is reported to have been on guard at Radio Congo when Patrice Lumumba attempted a broadcast in the confusion around the time of Congo's independence in 1960 from Belgium.

=== Chief of Defence Staff ===
Aferi continued in the military on his return to Ghana where he rose to the rank of brigadier. He was promoted to Major General and made the Chief of Defence Staff (CDS) after the dismissal of Major General Otu, then CDS by President Nkrumah. He was the last CDS to serve before the overthrow of Nkrumah in Ghana's first military coup.

== Politics ==
Aferi was the first Commissioner for Foreign Affairs in the National Redemption Council military government of General Kutu Acheampong in 1972.

== Death ==
Aferi died on April 8, 2003, in Accra, Ghana.

Military offices
Preceded by Major General Stephen J. A. Otu	Chief of the Defence Staff; 1965 – 1966	Succeeded by Lieutenant General Emmanuel Kwasi Kotoka
Political offices
Preceded by William Ofori Atta	Foreign Minister; 1972	Succeeded by Col. Kwame R.M. Baah
