= Joy Amedume =

Ghanaian rear admiral and Chief of Naval Staff

Rear Admiral Joy Kobla Amedume served in the Ghana Navy. He served as Chief of Naval Staff of the Ghana Navy from June 1977 to June 1979. He was appointed twice to this position first from May 1972 to January 1973 and then from June 1977 to June 1979.

== Arrest and execution ==
He was arrested in June 1979 when Junior Officers of the Ghana armed forces staged a coup d'état on June 4, 1979, and released Flight Lieutenant J J Rawlings who had been arrested and was on trial for attempting a coup on May 15, 1979. The officers then formed the Armed Forces Revolutionary Council (AFRC) and made JJ Rawlings their leader. Under the aegis of the AFRC 8 senior military officers including two former Heads of States as well as Rear Admiral Joy Amedume were put on military trial and executed on June 26, 1979. In 2001, their bodies were released to their families for reburial.

Military offices
| Preceded by Philemon Quaye | Chief of Naval Staff; May 1972 - Jan 1973 | Succeeded by Chemogoh Kevin Dzang |

Military offices
| Preceded by Chemogoh Kevin Dzang | Chief of Naval Staff; Jun 1977 - Jun 1979 | Succeeded by Stephen Obimpeh |
