= National Redemption Council =

Ghana military government (1972–1975)

Overview
- Established: 13 January 1972
- Dissolved: 9 October 1975
- State: Ghana
- Leader: Chairman (Ignatius Kutu Acheampong)
- Headquarters: Accra

The National Redemption Council (NRC) was the ruling Ghana military government from 13 January 1972 to 9 October 1975. Its chairman was Colonel I. K. Acheampong, who was thus also the head of state of Ghana.

== Duration of rule ==
The NRC came into power through a bloodless coup d'état, led by Acheampong, which overthrew the democratically elected Progress Party (PP) government of Dr. K. A. Busia, taking place while Dr. Busia was in the United Kingdom for medical reasons. The constitution was suspended and all political parties banned. One of the main grievances leading to the coup had been the currency devaluations undertaken under the PP regime.

=== 13 January 1972 ===
Acheampong is reported to have been promoted to Colonel just two days prior to the coup to "secure his loyalty" for the Busia government. He was also the commander of the First Infantry Brigade at the time (now Southern Command of the Ghana Army). He collaborated with three officers, Major Agbo, Major Baah and Major Selormey, whose military units were vital for the bloodless coup. Agbo is quoted as stating that Acheampong was brought in at the latter stages to support the coup. Agbo was the second-in-command of the First Infantry Battalion at Tema, Selormey was the second-in-command of the armored regiment and Baah was the second-in-command of the Fifth Infantry Battalion in Accra. Acheampong stated in the nationwide broadcast to announce the coup that:

I bring you good tidings; Busia's hypocrisy has been detected. We, in the Ghana Armed Forces, have today taken over the Government from Busia and his ruling Progress Party. With immediate effect, the Constitution is withdrawn, Parliament is dissolved, the Progress Party and all political parties are banned.

=== 9 October 1975 ===
On 9 October 1975, the NRC was replaced by the Supreme Military Council. Its composition consisted of Acheampong, the chairman, who was also promoted straight from Colonel to General. The others included the military hierarchy including all military service commanders such as Lt. Gen. Akuffo the Chief of Defence Staff, and the army, navy, air force and Border Guards commanders respectively. Some officers were promoted, some changed portfolios and many others were dropped. The Commanders of the First and Second Infantry Brigades of the Ghana Army were also included. It is thought that this coup removed Agbo, Baah and Selormey, whom Acheampong had begun to see as a threat. It also made the various service commanders in charge of both the military and the state as there had been some tensions between relatively junior officers in government and the senior commanders of the Armed Forces.

== Programmes ==
The NRC government embarked on various programmes to help improve the economy. One of its most successful was the "Operation Feed Yourself" programme which encouraged self-reliance on home-grown food by encouraging both large scale and small scale farming. This started well but is ultimately seen as a failure in the end. It was during this era that the National Pledge was also introduced. This was to be recited on national occasions. The government also revalued the national currency which had been devalued by the Busia government by 42 per cent. It also repudiated some of the national debt in February 1972. On 4 August 1974, the "Operation Keep Right" was implemented which changed Ghana's road traffic from driving on the left as introduced by the United Kingdom to driving on the right in harmony with its neighbouring West African states where traffic circulation was on the right. This was supervised by Akuffo who was the Border Guards commander at the time. The NRC government also implemented the official conversion of units of measurement in the country to the metric system on 1 September 1975.

== Foiled coup attempts ==
There were several attempts to overthrow the NRC government. None of them resulted in bloodshed. In November 1972, 8 people were found guilty by a military tribunal for plotting to overthrow the government. They were Staff Sergeant S. J. Opon-Nyantekyi, Daniel D. O. Attakora, Emil W. K. Adzima who was the former press secretary to Kofi Busia, George K. A. Ofosu-Amaah, who was a senior lecturer in law at the University of Ghana and Director of the Special Branch (national intelligence unit) in the Busia regime, Private C. Adu Boateng, Sergeant W. Agyare, Private K. Oduro and Sergeant G. Nimako.

In August 1973, Kojo Botsio, a minister in the Nkrumah CPP government together with others was arrested for planning to overthrow the government.

In December 1973, three out of five accused persons were found guilty of subversion by a military tribunal. The guilty were Imoru Ayarna, former leader of the disbanded People's Action Party, Kojo Botsio and John Tettegah. Albert Kwaku Owusu-Boateng was jailed for 30 years for concealing the plot while Air Force Major Alexander A. Awuviri was acquitted and discharged.

In 1976, a coup plot referred to as the "One Man One Matchet" coup was foiled. The plotters included Brigadier Khattah, the leader, who escaped arrest and the others were Kojo Tsikata, a retired Ghana Army captain, Victor Latzoo, a retired lieutenant in the Ghana Army, Staff Sergeant Godfried K. Amereka, Warrant Officer H. Raphael Nyatepeh, Captain Gustav K. Banini, Corporal John Gbeeze, Francis Agboada and Michael Hamenoo. Tsikata, Staff Sergeant Godfried Amereka, Warrant Officer Raphael Nyatepeh, Francis Agboada and Michael Hamenoo were sentenced to death. Two others were sentenced to eighteen years in jail.

== Members of the NRC ==
The NRC was made up of Acheampong, the various service commanders of the Ghana Armed Forces, the Inspector General of Police, four other army officers of the rank of Major and a civilian who was the Attorney General and Commissioner for Justice.

=== List of members ===
Office	Name	Start	End
Head of state and Chairman	Colonel Ignatius Kutu Acheampong	13 January 1972	9 October 1975
Chief of the Defence Staff	Major General N. Y. A. Ashley-Larsen	13 January 1972	December 1974
Chief of Army Staff	Colonel Emmanuel Alexander Erskine	13 January 1972	?
Chief of Naval Staff	Commodore P.F. Quaye	13 January 1972	?
Chief of Air Staff	Air Commodore Charles Beausoliel	13 January 1972	?
Inspector General of Police	J. H. Cobbina	13 January 1972	September 1974
Member	Colonel J. C. Adjeitey	13 January 1972	
Member	Lt. Colonel C.D. Benni	13 January 1972	9 October 1975
Member	Lt. Colonel Kwame R.M. Baah (then Major)	13 January 1972	9 October 1975
Member	Lt. Colonel Anthony Hugh Selormey (then Major)	13 January 1972	9 October 1975
Member	Lt. Colonel K. B. Agbo (then Major)	13 January 1972	9 October 1975
Member	Major General Roger J A Felli	13 January 1972	9 October 1975
Member	Commander Boham	13 January 1972	?
Member	Lt. Colonel Barnor	1972	
Attorney General & Commissioner for Justice; Member	E. N. Moore	13 January 1972	9 October 1975

=== List of commissioners in NRC government ===
Office	Name	Start	End
Commissioner for Foreign Affairs	Major General Nathan Apea Aferi	1972	1972
Commissioner for Foreign Affairs	Major Kwame Baah	1972	9 October 1975
Commissioner for Internal Affairs and Inspector General of Police	J. H. Cobbina	13 January 1972	September 1974
Commissioner for Internal Affairs and Inspector General of Police	Ernest Ako	September 1974	October 1975
Commissioner for Defence	Colonel Kutu Acheampong	13 January 1972	9 October 1975
Attorney-General and Commissioner for Justice	Edward Nathaniel Moore	13 January 1972	9 October 1975
Commissioner for Finance and Economic Affairs	Colonel Kutu Acheampong	13 January 1972	?
Commissioner for Finance and Economic Affairs	Major Roger J. A. Felli	c. 1974	
Commissioner for Finance and Economic Affairs	Amon Nikoi (Commissioner for Finance and Economic Planning)	?	9 October 1975
Commissioner for Local Government	Colonel Victor Coker-Appiah	c. 1972	
Commissioner for Local Government	Major General Nathan Aferi	13 January 1972	9 October 1975
Commissioner for Agriculture	Major-General Daniel Addo	1972	1973
Commissioner for Agriculture	Colonel Frank Bernasko	1973	1975
Commissioner for Agriculture	Lt. Col Paul Nkegbe	1975	
Commissioner for Health	Colonel J. C. Adjeitey	?	?
Commissioner for Health	Lt. Colonel Anthony Hugh Selormey	1 May 1973	9 October 1975
Commissioner for Labour, Social Welfare and Co-operatives	Major Kwame Asante	1972	1973
Commissioner for Labour, Social Welfare and Co-operatives	Major K. B. Agbo	1973	9 October 1975
Commissioner for Lands and Mineral Resources	Major Kwame Baah	c. 1972	
Commissioner for Lands and Mineral Resources	Major General D. C. K. Amenu	?	9 October 1975
Commissioner for Industry	Major K. B. Agbo	1972	?
Commissioner for Industry	Lt. Col. George Minyila	?	9 October 1975
Commissioner for Works and Housing	Major Roger Felli	1972	1972
Commissioner for Works and Housing	Colonel Victor Coker-Appiah	1972	1974
Commissioner for Works and Housing	Colonel R. E. A. Kotei	?	9 October 1975
Commissioner for Trade and Tourism	Major Roger Felli	1972	?
Commissioner for Trade and Tourism	Lt. Colonel D. A. Iddisah	1974	9 October 1975
Commissioner for Transport and Communications	Lt. Col. Anthony Selormey	1972	1973
Commissioner for Transport and Communications	Major Kwame Asante	1973	April 1974
Commissioner for Transport and Communications	Colonel Peter Kwame Agyekum	April 1974	9 October 1975
Commissioner for Education, Culture and Sports	Lieutenant-Colonel Paul Nkegbe	c. 1973	
Commissioner for Education, Culture and Sports	Colonel Emmanuel Obeng Nyante (Commissioner for Education, Youth and Culture)	?	9 October 1975
Commissioner for Information	Colonel Kutu Acheampong	?	
Commissioner for Information	Colonel C. R. Tachie-Menson	1974	9 October 1975
Commissioner for Cocoa Affairs	Colonel Frank Bernasko		
Commissioner for Cocoa Affairs	Commander J. A. Kyeremeh	?	October 1975
Commissioner for NRC Affairs	Lt. Colonel C.D. Benni		
Commissioner for NRC Affairs	E. K. Buckman	?	October 1975

=== List of regional commissioners in NRC government ===
Office	Name	Start	End
Ashanti Regional Commissioner	Lt. Colonel E. A. Baidoo	January 1972	May 1974
Ashanti Regional Commissioner	Commander Joy K. Amedume	May 1974	9 October 1975
Brong Ahafo Region	Commander J. A. Kyeremeh	1972	1974
Brong Ahafo Region	Lt. Col. Victor Coker Appiah	1974	30 April 1975
Brong Ahafo Region	Lt. Col. O. K. Abrefa	May 1975	October 1975
Central Region	Colonel Frank Bernasko	1972	1973
Central Region	Commander Joy Amedume	1973	May 1974
Central Region	Lt. Col. E. A. Baidoo	May 1974	9 October 1975
Eastern Region	Colonel Emmanuel Obeng Nyante	1972	?
Eastern Region	Lt. Col. George Minyila	1973	1975
Eastern Region	Lt. Col. Kweku Adade Takyi	1975	October 1975
Greater Accra Regional Commissioner	Col. W. C. O. Acquaye-Nortey	14 January 1972	29 May 1972
Greater Accra Regional Commissioner	Lt. Colonel Philip K. D. Habadah	30 May 1972	9 October 1975
Northern Regional Commissioner	Lt. Colonel D. A. Iddisah	1972	?
Northern Regional Commissioner	Col. P. K. Agyekum	1973	April 1974
Northern Regional Commissioner	Lt. Col. Festus F. Addae	April 1974	9 October 1975
Upper Region	Lt. Colonel George Minyila	1972	?
Upper Region	Col. W. C. O. Acquaye-Nortey	30 May 1972	30 August 1975
Upper Region	Major Michael Ofori-Akuamoah	?	October 1975
Volta Regional Commissioner	Major Philip K. D. Habadah	1972	May 1973
Volta Regional Commissioner	Colonel E. O. Nyante	May 1973	January 1974
Volta Regional Commissioner	Col. J. A. Kabore	January 1974	9 October 1975
Western Region	Colonel P. A. Agyekum	1972	?
Western Region	Commander J. A. Kyeremeh	1974	
Western Region	Col. W. C. O. Acquaye-Nortey	1 September 1975	9 October 1975

Office	Name	Dates	Notes
Secretary to the Cabinet	Nathan Quao	1972–1973	
Secretary to the Cabinet	Ebenezer Moses Debrah	1973–1976	
Secretary to the Cabinet	Frank W. Beecham	1976–1978	

== Some programmes of the NRC ==
- The NRC introduced the Ghana National Pledge.
- Operation Feed Yourself - an Agricultural campaign for national self-sufficiency in food supplies.
- Operation Keep Right - The changeover from driving on the left to the right which occurred on 4 August 1974.

Preceded by Busia government (1969-1972)	Government of Ghana (Military Regime); 1972 – 1975	Succeeded by Supreme Military Council (1975–1978)

Preceded by Busia government (1969–1972)	Government of Ghana (Military Regime); January 1972 – October 1975	Succeeded by Supreme Military Council (1975–1979)
