= Fred Akuffo =

Head of State of Ghana from 1978 to 1979

Lieutenant General Fred Akuffo
- Akuffo c. 1978

6th Head of State of Ghana
- In office 5 July 1978 – 4 June 1979
- Deputy: Joshua Hamidu
- Preceded by: Ignatius Kutu Acheampong
- Succeeded by: Jerry Rawlings

2nd Chairman of the Supreme Military Council
- In office 5 July 1978 – 4 June 1979
- Deputy: Joshua Hamidu
- Preceded by: Ignatius Kutu Acheampong
- Succeeded by: Position abolished

2nd Deputy Head of State of Ghana
- In office 9 October 1975 – 5 July 1978
- Head of State: Ignatius Kutu Acheampong
- Preceded by: John Willie Kofi Harlley (1969)
- Succeeded by: Joshua Hamidu

1st Deputy Chairman of the Supreme Military Council
- In office 9 October 1975 – 5 July 1978
- Chairman: Ignatius Kutu Acheampong
- Preceded by: Position established
- Succeeded by: Joshua Hamidu

Personal details
- Born: Frederick William Kwasi Akuffo; 21 March 1937 Akropong, Gold Coast
- Died: 26 June 1979 (aged 42) Accra, Ghana
- Cause of death: Execution by firing squad
- Party: Independent
- Spouse: Emily Akuffo
- Profession: Soldier

Military service
- Branch/service: Ghana Army
- Years of service: 1957–1979
- Rank: Lieutenant general
- Commands: Chief of Defence Staff; Chief of Army Staff; Commander 2nd Infantry Brigade (now Northern Command); Commander, 6th Battalion
- Battles/wars: Congo Crisis
- Other: Organized Operation Keep Right when Ghana changed over to driving on the right in August 1974

Lieutenant General Frederick William Kwasi Akuffo (21 March 1937 – 26 June 1979) was a Ghanaian soldier and politician who was the Chief of the Defence Staff of the Ghana Armed Forces from 1976 to 1978, and chairman of the ruling Supreme Military Council and the sixth military head of state from 1978 to 1979. He became leader of the government in a palace coup against General Ignatius Kutu Acheampong, and was overthrown and executed in another military coup less than a year later.

== Early life and education ==
Fred Akuffo was born at Akropong in the Eastern Region of Ghana. He completed his secondary education in 1955 at the Presbyterian Boys' Secondary School in Odumase Krobo. He then enlisted in the Ghana Army in 1957 and trained at the Royal Military Academy, Sandhurst, UK among others, receiving his commission in 1960. He was married to Mrs. Emily Akuffo. He also attended the National Defence College in India in 1973.

== Career ==
While in the army, he served as commanding officer of the Airborne Training School at Tamale and later the 6th Battalion of Infantry of the Ghana Army between 1969 and 1970. He succeeded Colonel John Kabore as the Commander of the Border Guard Unit. He rose to become the 2nd Brigade Commander. He supervised the change over of traffic flow in Ghana from driving on the left to driving on the right as part of 'Operation Keep Right' which was effected on 4 August 1974. This changeover was successful and largely accident free. He rose to become the Army Commander in April 1974 and Chief of the Defence Staff in April 1976.

== Politics ==
On 9 October 1975 Fred Akuffo was appointed a member of the ruling Supreme Military Council government due to his position as Ghana's army commander. On 5 July 1978, he led a palace coup to overthrow the head of state, General Ignatius Acheampong. He continued with the ongoing preparations to return Ghana to constitutional rule but his government was also cut short on 4 June 1979 by a military uprising by the junior ranks of the Ghana military led by Flight Lieutenant Jerry John Rawlings and the Armed Forces Revolutionary Council (AFRC).

== Execution ==
He was executed along with other senior military officers on 26 June 1979 at the Teshie Military Range, Ghana.

== See also ==
Military offices
| Preceded by Brigadier E. A. Erskine | Chief of Army Staff; 1974 – 1976 | Succeeded by Major General Robert Kotei |
| Preceded by Major General Lawrence Okai | Chief of Defence Staff; 1976 – 1978 | Succeeded by Major General Robert Kotei |
Political offices
| Preceded by Ignatius Kutu Acheampong; Military Head of state | Head of state of Ghana; Military regime 1978–1979 | Succeeded by Jerry Rawlings; Military Head of state |
| Preceded by I. K. Acheampong | Commissioner for Defence; 1978–1979 | Succeeded by ? |
