= Ignatius Kutu Acheampong =

Head of State of Ghana from 1972 to 1978

General Ignatius Kutu Acheampong
- Official portrait, 1972

5th Head of State of Ghana
- In office 13 January 1972 – 5 July 1978
- Deputy: None (1972–1975); Fred Akuffo (1975–1978)
- Preceded by: Kofi Abrefa Busia (as Prime Minister)
- Succeeded by: Fred Akuffo

1st Chairman of the Supreme Military Council
- In office 9 October 1975 – 5 July 1978
- Deputy: Fred Akuffo
- Preceded by: Position established; Himself (as Chairman of the National Redemption Council)
- Succeeded by: Fred Akuffo

Chairman of the National Redemption Council
- In office 13 January 1972 – 9 October 1975
- Preceded by: Position established
- Succeeded by: Position abolished; Himself (as Chairman of the Supreme Military Council)

Personal details
- Born: 23 September 1931 Gold Coast
- Died: 16 June 1979 (aged 47) Accra, Ghana
- Cause of death: Execution by firing squad
- Party: (none) military
- Spouse: Faustina Acheampong
- Profession: Soldier

Military service
- Allegiance: Ghana
- Branch/service: Ghana Army
- Years of service: 1951–1978
- Rank: General
- Unit: Royal West African Frontier Force
- Battles/wars: Congo Crisis

Ignatius Kutu Acheampong (/əˈtʃæmˈpɒŋ/ ə-CHAM-PONG; 23 September 1931 – 16 June 1979) was a Ghanaian military officer and politician who was the military head of state of Ghana from 13 January 1972 to 5 July 1978, when he was deposed in a palace coup. He was executed by firing squad on 16 June 1979.

== Early life and education ==
Acheampong was born to Catholic parents of Ashanti origin. His parents were James Kwadwo Kutu Acheampong, a Catholic catechist, and Madam Akua Manu. He attended the Roman Catholic schools at Trabuom and the St Peter's school at Kumasi, both in the Ashanti Region of Ghana. He attended the then Central College of Commerce at Agona Swedru in the Central Region of Ghana.

Acheampong worked as a stenographer/secretary at Timber Sawmill in Kumasi and taught at Kumasi Commercial College before becoming Vice-Principal at Agona-Swedru College of Commerce.

Acheampong trained at Aldershot Garrison in England, as a cadet officer. He was commissioned in the Ghana Army in 1959, and served as a member of the UN peacekeepers during the Congo Crisis.

== Politics ==
Acheampong's first foray into politics was as the Western Regional Commissioner under the National Liberation Council military government, which had overthrown the CPP Kwame Nkrumah government.

On 13 January 1972, as Colonel, and commander of Ghana's First Infantry Brigade, Acheampong led a bloodless coup d'état to overthrow the democratically elected government of the Progress Party and its leader Dr Kofi Busia.

On 9 October 1975, now a General, he became head of state and chairman of the National Redemption Council (NRC), which later became the Supreme Military Council.

A few months after Acheampong came to power, on 27 April 1972, former president Kwame Nkrumah died in exile. Power in Ghana had changed hands several times since Nkrumah was overthrown, and Acheampong allowed Nkrumah's body to be returned and buried on 9 July 1972 at the village of his birth, Nkroful. Notable historical changes and events introduced or implemented in Ghana during the period under Acheampong include the change from the Imperial measurement to the metric system, the change from driving on the left to driving on the right, Operation Feed Yourself (a programme aimed at developing self-reliance in agriculture), "National Reconstruction" (aimed at promoting employment and skill for workers), face-lift projects in cities, and the reconstruction/upgrading of stadia to meet international standards.

There were, however, widespread accusations of both the encouragement and endorsement of corruption in the country under his rule. Also, Ghana began experiencing the troubles it had suffered under previous administrations, with increasing food prices and soaring inflation.

In 1976, under intense political pressure, Acheampong began to flirt with the idea of a government in which the military could play a role and proposed a 'Union Government' (UNIGOV) with power sharing between civilians and the armed forces. This led to student demonstrations and the closure of universities. Violent clashes between pro- and anti-UNIGOV factions led to the death of at least four people in Kumasi.

== Execution ==
Following the 4 June 1979 military uprising that brought Flight Lieutenant Jerry John Rawlings and the young officers of the Armed Forces Revolutionary Council (AFRC) to power, Acheampong was court-martialed and executed along with General Edward Kwaku Utuka by firing squad on 16 June. Ten days later, two other former heads of state, Akwasi Afrifa and Fred Akuffo, and senior military officers Joy Amedume, George Boakye, Roger Joseph Felli and Robert Kotei, were executed. The AFRC returned Ghana to civilian rule three months after the uprising.

== Personal life ==
Acheampong was married to Faustina Acheampong; they had three sons and four daughters. One grandson is the American football player Charlie Peprah, another is Fulham F.C. striker Yakini Acheampong.

== See also ==
- National Redemption Council
- Supreme Military Council
- Corruption in Ghana

Political offices
Preceded by Edward Akufo-Addo; President	Head of state of Ghana; 1972–1978	Succeeded by Fred Akuffo; Head of state
Preceded by Kofi Busia; Prime Minister	Head of state of Ghana; 1972–1978	Succeeded by Fred Akuffo; Head of state
Preceded by Bukari Adama	Minister for Defence; 1972–?	Succeeded by F. W. K. Akuffo
Preceded by Joseph Henry Mensah	Minister for Finance and Economic Affairs; 1972–?	Succeeded by Amon Nikoi
Preceded by T.D. Brodie Mends	Minister for Information; 1969-1971	Succeeded by Colonel C.R. Tachie Menson
