= First presidency of John Mahama =

Ghanaian presidential administration from 2012 to 2017

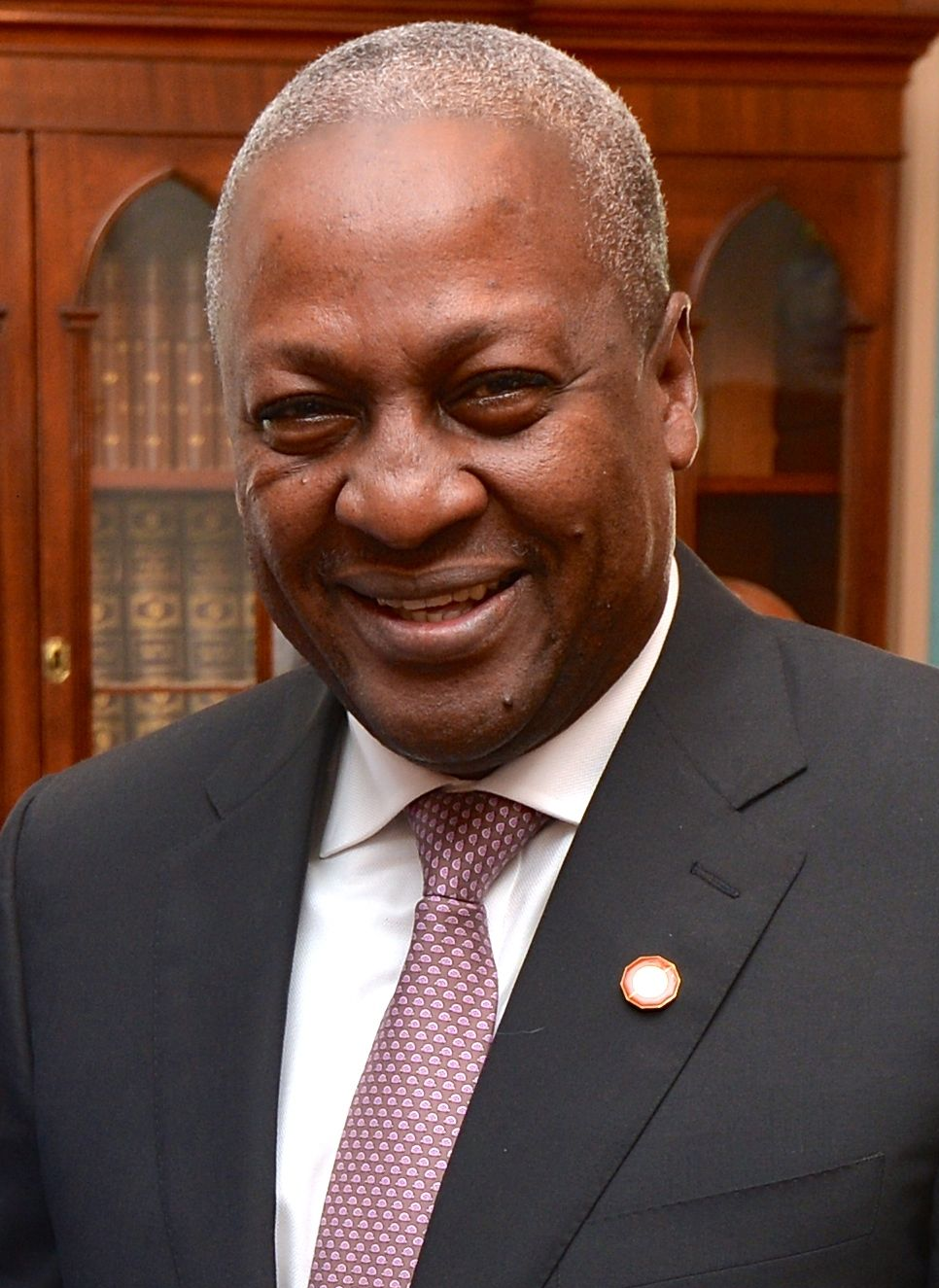
- First presidency of John Mahama; 24 July 2012 – 7 January 2017
- President: John Dramani Mahama
- Cabinet: See list
- Party: National Democratic Congress
- Election: 2012
- Seat: Jubilee House
- Seal of the President

John Mahama's first tenure as President of Ghana began when he succeeded John Atta Mills following the latter's death in office on 24 July 2012. Mahama previously served as Vice-President of Ghana from January 2009 to July 2012, and is the first head of state of Ghana to have been born after the country's independence. He was elected after the December 2012 election for a full term as president.

Upon assuming office, Mahama continued the Better Ghana Agenda policy vision initiated by his predecessor. He contested re-election for a second term in the 2016 election, but lost to the New Patriotic Party candidate Nana Akufo-Addo. This made him the first president in the history of Ghana to not have won a second term consecutively. He left office on 7 January 2017, and was re-elected as president in 2024.

== 2012 general election ==
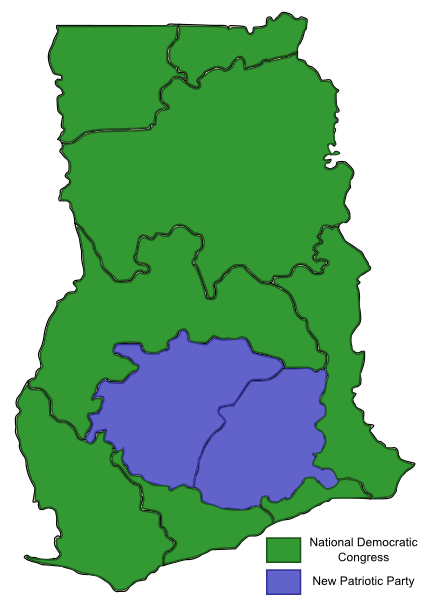
2012 general election results map by region

NDC

NPP

Incumbent president John Mahama was declared winner of the presidential election with just 50.7% of the vote, a few thousand votes over the threshold for avoiding a run-off election. Nana Akufo-Addo on the other hand received 47.74%. However, the opposition did not accept the results and accused the Electoral Commission (EC) of tampering with the results. The opposition filed a petition at the Ghanaian Supreme Court to review the election results but Mahama was declared as president, winning a full term.

=== Reactions ===
The non-partisan Coalition of Domestic Election Observers (CODEO), the Economic Community of West African States (ECOWAS) and the African Union (AU) all declared that the elections were, for the most part, free and fair. Despite this, there were still widespread allegations of voting irregularities, though these were dismissed as unsubstantiated by the electoral commission chairman. As a result of these claims, the New Patriotic Party immediately rejected the results upon their release and its candidate, Nana Akufo-Addo, remarked that his party's leaders would be meeting on 11 December to consider their options, one of which is to contest the results by lodging an appeal in court. Violent opposition was however ruled out.

African Union commission chairman Thomas Boni Yayi flew to Ghana to meet with the two men. He was also reported to have congratulated Mahama on his victory, and charged him to preside over an all-inclusive government. Yayi praised the conduct and the participants of the election.

In anticipation of petitions regarding the election, Chief Justice Georgina Theodora Wood has established two public complaints secretariats to swiftly process such concerns. In a statement after being declared the victor, Mahama gave a reconciliatory message, saying "I wish to welcome my fellow candidates to join me now as partners in the project of nation building and of creating a better Ghana".

== Inauguration ==
Mahama was inaugurated on 7 January 2013. Thirteen African Heads of State, one Prime Minister, two Vice-Presidents and 18 government delegations across the world attended his inaugural ceremony at the Black Star Square in Accra when Mahama was sworn-in to begin his own four-year term. He said in parliament upon being sworn in:

This is the saddest day in our nation's history. Tears have engulfed our nation and we are deeply saddened and distraught and I'm personally devastated, I've lost a father, I've lost a friend, I've lost a mentor and a senior comrade. Ghana is united in grief at this time for our departed president.

== Ministers and administration ==
=== Initial ministers before the 2012 general election ===
All the ministers had appointed by President Mills as part of his government. They continued to serve until January 2013 when his term would have ended. The exception was Henry Kamel, who died after the 7 December election but before the formal handover on 7 January 2013. The ministers were advised to stay on as caretaker ministers until new ones had been confirmed in their place.

Former Cabinet
President	John Dramani Mahama	2012 – January 2017
Vice President	Kwesi Amissah-Arthur	2012 – January 2017
Cabinet Ministers
Office(s)	Officeholder	Term
Minister for Foreign Affairs and Regional Integration	Muhammad Mumuni	2012 – 2013
Minister for the Interior	William Kwasi Aboah	2012 – 2013
Minister for Finance and Economic Planning	Kwabena Dufuor	2012 – 2013
Minister for Defence	Lt. Gen. Joseph Henry Smith	2012 – 2013
Attorney General and Minister for Justice	Benjamin Kunbuor	2012 – 2013
Minister for Education	Lee Ocran	2012 – 2013
Minister for Food and Agriculture	Kwesi Ahwoi	2012 – 2013
Minister for Trade and Industry	Hanna Tetteh	2012 – 2013
Minister for Health	Alban Bagbin (MP)	2012 – 2013
Minister for Local Government and Rural Development	Samuel Kwame Ofosu-Ampofo	2012 – 2013
Minister for Tourism	Akua Sena Dansua (MP)	2012 – 2013
Minister for Energy	Joe Oteng-Adjei	2012 – 2013
Minister for Transport	Collins Dauda (MP)	2012 – 2013
Minister for Roads and Highways	Joe Kwashie Gidisu (MP)	2012 – 2013
Minister for Lands and Natural Resources	Mike Allen Hammah (MP)	2012 – 2013
Minister for Women and Children's Affairs	Juliana Azumah-Mensah (MP)	2012 – 2013
Minister for Communications	Haruna Iddrisu	2012 – 2013
Minister for Environment, Science and Technology	Sherry Ayitey	2012 – 2013
Minister for Information	Fritz Baffour (MP)	2012 – 2013
Minister for Employment and Social Welfare	Moses Asaga (MP)	2012 – 2013
Minister for Water Resources, Works and Housing	Enoch Teye Mensah (MP)	2012 – 2013
Minister for Youth and Sports	Clement Kofi Humado (MP)	2012 – 2013
Minister for Chieftaincy and Culture	Alexander Asum-Ahensah (MP)	2012 – 2013
Regional Ministers
Region	Officeholder	Term
Ashanti Region	Dr. Kwaku Agyemang-Mensah	2012 – 2013
Brong Ahafo Region	Kwadwo Nyamekye Marfo	2012 – 2013
Central Region	Ama Benyiwa-Doe	2012 – 2013
Eastern Region	Victor Emmanuel Smith	2012 – 2013
Greater Accra Regional Minister	Nii Armah Ashitey	2012 – 2013
Northern Region	Moses Magbenba	2012 – 2013
Upper East Region	Mark Woyongo (MP)	2012 – 2013
Upper West Region	Amin Amidu Sulemana	2012 – 2013
Volta Regional Minister	Henry Ford Kamel (MP)	2012 – 25 Dec 2012

=== Ministers from 2013 to 2017 ===
Current Cabinet
Office(s)	Officeholder	Term
President	John Dramani Mahama	2012 – 2017
Vice President	Kwesi Amissah-Arthur	2012 – 2017
Cabinet Ministers
Office(s)	Officeholder	Term
Minister for Foreign Affairs	Hanna Tetteh (MP)	30 January 2013 – 2017
Minister for the Interior	Kwesi Ahwoi	14 February 2013– 16 July 2014
Minister for the Interior	Mark Owen Woyongo (MP)	16 July 2014 – 2017
Minister for Finance and Economic Planning	Seth Terkper	30 January 2013 – 2017
Minister for Defence	Mark Owen Woyongo (MP)	14 February 2013 – 16 July 2014
Minister for Defence	Benjamin Kunbuor (MP)	16 July 2014 – 2017
Attorney General and Minister for Justice	Marietta Brew Appiah-Oppong	14 February 2013 – 2017
Minister for Education	Jane Naana Opoku Agyemang	2013 – 2017
Minister for Food and Agriculture	Clement Kofi Humado (MP)	30 January 2013 – ?
Minister for Food and Agriculture	Fiifi Fiavi Kwetey (MP)	16 July 2014 – 2017
Minister for Trade and Industry	Haruna Iddrisu (MP)	14 February 2013 – 16 July 2014
Minister for Trade and Industry	Ekwow Spio-Garbrah	16 July 2014 – 2017
Minister for Health	Hanny-Sherry Ayitey	14 February 2013 – 16 July 2014
Minister for Health	Kwaku Agyemang-Mensah	16 July 2014 – 14 March 2015
Minister for Health	Alex Segbefia	16 March 2015 – 2017
Minister for Information and Media Relations (merged with Minister for Communications from 16 July 2014)	Mahama Ayariga (MP)	30 January 2013 – 16 July 2014 (merged with Minister for Communications from 16 July 2014)
Minister for Local Government and Rural Development	Akwasi Oppong Fosu (MP)	2013 – 30 May 2014
Minister for Local Government and Rural Development	Julius Debrah	30 May 2014 – 2017
Minister for Local Government and Rural Development	Collins Dauda	
Minister for Tourism, Culture and Creative Arts	Elizabeth Ofosu-Agyare	14 February 2013 – 2017
Minister for Energy and Petroleum	Emmanuel Armah Kofi Buah (MP)	14 February 2013 – 2017
Minister for Transport	Dzifa Aku Ativor	14 February 2013 – 23 December 2015
Minister for Roads and Highways	Amin Amidu Sulemana (MP)	30 January 2013 – 16 July 2014
Minister for Roads and Highways	Inusah Fuseini (MP)	16 July 2014 – 2017
Minister for Lands and Natural Resources	Inusah Fuseini (MP)	30 January 2013 – 16 July 2014
Minister for Lands and Natural Resources	Nii Osah Mills	16 July 2014 – 2017
Minister for Communications	Edward Omane Boamah	14 February 2013 – 7 January 2017
Minister for Environment, Science and Technology	Joe Oteng-Adjei	2013 – 16 July 2014
Minister for Environment, Science and Technology	Akwasi Oppong Fosu	16 July 2014 – 14 March 2015
Minister for Environment, Science and Technology	Mahama Ayariga (MP)	16 March 2015 – 2017
Minister for Employment and Labour Relations	Nii Armah Ashitey (MP)	14 February 2013 – 16 July 2014
Minister for Employment and Labour Relations	Haruna Iddrisu (MP)	16 July 2014 – 2017
Minister for Water Resources, Works and Housing	Collins Dauda (MP)	30 January 2013 – 14 March 2015
Minister for Water Resources, Works and Housing	Kwaku Agyemang-Mensah	16 March 2015 – 2017
Minister for Fisheries and Aquaculture Development	Nayon Bilijo	14 February 2013 – 16 July 2014
Minister for Fisheries and Aquaculture Development	Hanny-Sherry Ayitey	16 July 2014 – 2017
Minister for Youth and Sports	Elvis Afriyie Ankrah	14 February 2013 – 16 July 2014
Minister for Youth and Sports	Mahama Ayariga (MP)	16 July 2014 – 14 March 2015
Minister for Youth and Sports	Dr. Mustapha Ahmed	15 March 2015 – 2017
Minister for Gender, Children and Social Protection	Nana Oye Lithur	2013 – 2017
Minister for Chieftaincy and Traditional Affairs	Henry Seidu Daanaa	14 February 2013 – 2017
Minister for Government Business in Parliament	Benjamin Kunbuor (MP)	14 February 2013 – 16 July 2014
Minister for Power	Kwabena Donkor	2014 – 31 December 2015
Regional Ministers
Region	Officeholder	Term
Ashanti Regional Minister	Samuel Sarpong	14 February 2013 – 11 March 2013
Ashanti Regional Minister	Eric Opoku	11 March 2013 – 16 July 2014
Ashanti Regional Minister	Samuel Sarpong	16 July 2014 – 14 March 2015
Ashanti Regional Minister	Peter Anarfi-Mensah	16 March 2015 – 2017
Brong Ahafo Region	Eric Opoku	14 February 2013 – 11 March 2013
Brong Ahafo Region	Paul Evans Aidoo (MP)	11 March 2013 – 16 July 2014
Brong Ahafo Region	Eric Opoku	16 July 2014 – 2017
Central Region	Ebenezer Kwadwo Teye Addo	2013 – 11 March 2013
Central Region	Samuel Sarpong	11 March 2013 – 16 July 2014
Central Region	Aquinas Quansah (MP)	16 July 2014 – January 2016
Central Region	Kweku George Ricketts-Hagan (MP)	January 2016 – 2017
Eastern Region	Julius Debrah	2013 – 11 March 2013
Eastern Region	Helen Ntoso	11 March 2013 – 16 July 2014
Eastern Region	Antwi Boasiako Sekyere	16 July 2014 – 2017
Greater Accra Regional Minister	Joshua Nii Laryea Afotey-Agbo (MP)	14 February 2013 – 11 March 2013
Greater Accra Regional Minister	Julius Debrah	11 March 2013 – 16 July 2014
Greater Accra Regional Minister	Joshua Nii Laryea Afotey-Agbo (MP)	16 July 2014 – 2017
Northern Region	Moses Bukari Mabengba (acting)	7 January 2013 – 11 March 2013
Northern Region	Bede Anwataazumo Ziedeng	11 March 2013 – 16 July 2014
Northern Region	Limuna Mohammed Muniru	16 July 2014 – January 2017
Upper East Region	Ephraim Avea Nsoh	2013 – 11 March 2013
Upper East Region	Limuna Mohammed Muniru (acting minister)	11 March 2013– 16 July 2014
Upper East Region	James Zooglah Tiigah	16 July 2014 – January 2017
Upper West Region	Bede Anwataazumo Ziedeng	2013 – 11 March 2013
Upper West Region	Ephraim Avea Nsoh	11 March 2013 – 16 July 2014
Upper West Region	Amin Amidu Sulemana (MP)	16 July 2014 – January 2017
Volta Regional Minister	Helen Ntoso	2013 – 11 March 2013
Volta Regional Minister	Joshua Nii Laryea Afotey-Agbo	11 March 2013 – 16 July 2014
Volta Regional Minister	Helen Ntoso	16 July 2014 – January 2017
Western Region	Paul Evans Aidoo (MP)	14 February 2013 – 11 March 2013
Western Region	Ebenezer Kwadwo Teye Addo	11 March 2013 – 16 July 2014
Western Region	Paul Evans Aidoo (MP)	16 July 2014 – January 2017

== Policy ==
=== National affairs ===
==== Dumsor ====
Dumsor is the frequent, persistent and irregular system of electrical power outage in Ghana. The frequent Ghanaian blackouts are caused by power supply shortage. Ghanaian generating capacity by 2015 was 400-600 megawatts less than what Ghana needed. Ghanaian electricity distributors regularly shed load with rolling blackouts. At the beginning of 2015, the dumsor schedule went from 24 hours with light and 12 without to 12 hours with light and 24 without. In August 2012, the government told Ghanaians that a ship's anchor cut the West African Gas Pipeline (WAGP), forcing gas turbines to shut down for lack of fuel. The Mahama government blamed it on the government's inability to add significant generating capacity over the years and promised to fix this. Karpower Burge was brought in to solve the problem. The government stated that it has plans to diversify its energy sources, using more renewables. It was also working to encourage energy conservation.

The Ghanaian Ministry of Power was created in November 2014, using the same staff as the continuing Ghanaian Ministry of Energy in response to dumsor.

==== Infrastructure ====
Mahama began the first phase of the Kejetia Central Market in 2015 and was valued at a cost of US$259,425,000. Upon completion, it was the largest single market in West Africa. In 2015, he cut the sod for the construction of the Ho Airport which is the first airport in the Volta Region. Construction of the Terminal 3 at the Accra International Airport began on 1 March 2016. The project was financed by the Ghana Airports Company Limited at the cost of $250 million. Turkish company, MAPA constructions and Trade Company, was the main contractor. The sold cutting was done by President John Mahama and Turkish President Recep Tayyip Erdoğan with the latter on a state visit to Ghana. The new terminal was completed in 2018 by the subsequent administration. On 14 November 2016 the president officially opened the Kwame Nkrumah Interchange to traffic.

=== International relations ===
==== Burkina Faso ====
On 3 November 2014, he led an ECOWAS delegation to Burkina Faso in response to the 2014 Burkinabé uprising. The delegation which included the Nigerian President Goodluck Jonathan and Senegalese leader Macky Sall, saw to mediate the crisis and seek an interim leader. Mahama stated that with an election due next year, an interim administration could lead the country into the scheduled date with the interim administration ineligible to stand; he was supported by Sall and Jonathan.

In 2015, Ghana, Burkina Faso, and Togo signed a pact to increase relations between the three neighboring countries. The three nations agreed to ease of movement between them to work together on issues of education, health, and agriculture. The agreement also calls for the discouraging of forced marriages within all three countries, as well as tackling petroleum smuggling operations and other cross-border criminal activities that have hurt the sister countries.

==== Iran ====
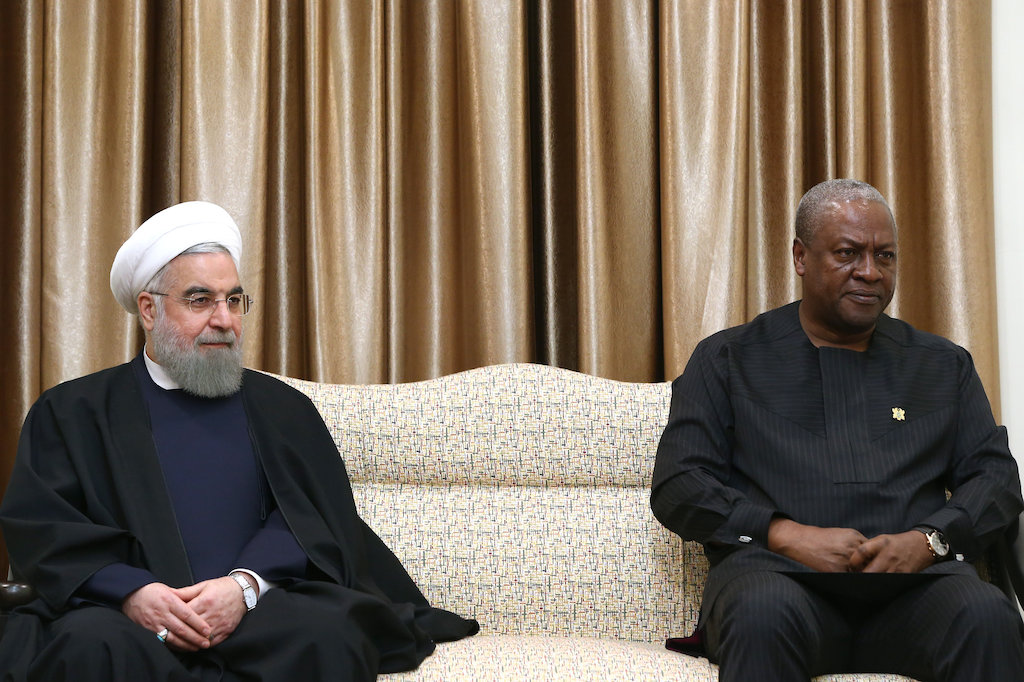
Ali Khamenei receives John Mahama

The Islamic Republic of Iran and the 6th President of Iran, Mahmoud Ahmadinejad met with Mahama on 16 April 2013 to hold discussions with the president on strengthening the Non-Aligned Movement. There was also a bilateral meeting between Ghana and Iran at the Ghanaian presidential palace, the Jubilee House. The Government of Ghana was reciprocated with an official state visit on 5 August 2013 by the Vice-President of Ghana, Kwesi Amissah-Arthur, who met with the Vice-President of Iran, Eshaq Jahangiri on the basis of autarky and possible bilateral trade at the Islamic Republic of Iran's presidential palace, Sa'dabad Palace.

==== Mali ====
John Mahama approved of logistical support by the Ghana Air Force to MINUSMA as Ghana participated in the Mali Civil War. The Ghana Aviation Unit provided the peacekeeping force with one C-295 which served as the sole permanent fixed-wing air support capacity of MINUSMA.

==== Multilateral relations ====
On 30 August 2014, the Ghanaian presidency officially announced of the use of Accra as a logistics and coordination center for the airlift of supplies and personnel to countries affected by the Western African Ebola virus epidemic. The decision came into fruition after a telephonic meeting with the United Nations chief, Ban Ki-moon and president Mahama. The "National Preparedness and Response Plan for Prevention and Control of Ebola" was implemented by the government in readiness for an outbreak. This helped to build and strengthen systems in preparation for any future epidemic, or pandemic. Accra became the designated base for UNMEER.

== Controversy ==
=== Corruption allegations ===
It was revealed in 2016 that Mahama accepted a Ford Expedition from a construction firm bidding for a lucrative government contract in 2012, while he was serving as vice president. The Burkinabe contractor who had previously constructed a wall at the Ghanaian Embassy in Ouagadougou was at the time looking to get a road-building contract in Ghana's Volta region; this contractor later secured the contract but the vehicle left by the ex president for Government use. Under Mahama's presidency in 2014, massive corruption was discovered at Ghana's Savannah Accelerated Development Authority (SADA). The authority had misappropriated millions of dollars allocated to it. SADA paid GH₵32,498,000 to ACICL, a business owned by Ghana's Roland Agambire, Mahama's close confidante, to plant five million trees in the savannah zone, but could only account for about 700,000 trees. It was also discovered that SADA spent GH¢15 million on guinea fowl, but could only account for a few of the birds. In 2015 it was again discovered that the contract for the rebranding of 116 Metro Mass Transit (MMT) buses at a cost of Gh₵3,600,000 was sole sourced and awarded to a company named "Smarttys," owned by a member of the ruling NDC activist Selassie Ibrahim. It was revealed that the rebranding of the buses cost the government Gh₵3,600,000 which at the time was more than the cost of the 116 buses.

== Re-election ==
Green denotes provinces won by Mahama, and Blue denotes those won by Akufo-Addo.

John Mahama represented the National Democratic Congress (NDC) while Akufo-Addo was chosen once again as the presidential candidate of the New Patriotic Party during the 2016 general election. Mahama was eligible for a second full term because he ascended as president six months before the end of Mills' term. In Ghana, a vice president who ascends to the presidency more than halfway into the term is eligible for two full terms in his own right.

On his third time representing the New Patriotic Party, Akufo-Addo defeated Mahama in the first round (winning with 53.85% of the votes), which marked the first time in a Ghanaian presidential election that an opposition candidate won a majority outright in the first round.

=== Coinciding parliamentary elections ===
The election of Members of Parliament (MPs) to the 7th Parliament of the Fourth Republic was held on 7 December 2016. The Speaker is not an elected member of parliament though he/she is qualified to stand for election as such. There are a total of 275 constituencies in Ghana. 45 new constituencies were created prior to the 2012 election. The 7th Parliament had its first sitting on Sunday 7 January 2017 shortly after midnight to elect a Speaker and Deputy Speakers as well as for the administration of oaths to the Speaker and Members of Parliament. Results from 238 constituencies are shown in the table below.

Affiliation	Members
New Patriotic Party (NPP)	169
National Democratic Congress (NDC)	106
Total	275
Government Majority	
