= List of Mahama government ministers =

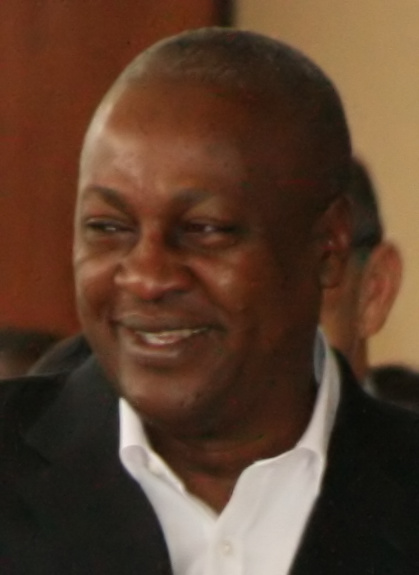
John Dramani Mahama

This is a listing of the ministers who served in the National Democratic Congress government of John Dramani Mahama in Ghana originally formed on 24 July 2012 following the death of John Atta Mills, and sworn in from January 2013. The government lost the December 2016 general election and its rule ended on 7 January 2017 when Nana Akufo-Addo of the New Patriotic Party became president.

== Ministers (January 2013 onwards) ==
=== Nominations for vetting ===
Following the swearing-in of President Mahama on 7 January 2013, the Parliament of Ghana vetted his nominations for Ministers of state from mid-January.

There were three sets of nominations submitted to the Parliament of Ghana in all for appointment as Ministers of State by President Mahama. The initial list contained 12 nominations A second list of 7 nominations were sent for approval about a week later. A third list of 12 nominees were added, including 6 Ministers of state at the Presidency. 2 further regional ministers were added to the list of nominees in early February 2013.

All the nominees for sector ministries were approved. The nominees for Ministers of state at the Presidency are listed below:

- Alhassan Azong (MP) — Public Sector Reform
- Mustapha Ahmed — Development Authorities
- Elvis Afriyie Ankrah — Financial and Allied institutions
- Limuna Mohammed Muniru — Human Resource Development and Scholarships
- Comfort Doyoe Cudjoe Ghansah — Social and Allied Institutions
- Abdul Rashid Hassan Pelpuo (MP) — Public-Private Partnerships

In addition to the list above, Paul Victor Obeng was to be a Senior Presidential Advisor at the Presidency. Three others were nominated to oversee priority projects of the President. They were Enoch Teye Mensah (MP), Alban Bagbin (MP) and Cletus Avoka (MP).

=== List of ministers from January 2013 ===
President Mahama swore in the first batch of seven ministers on 30 January 2013 following their approval by parliament. After the approval of more nominees by Parliament on 1 February 2013 and 12 February 2013, a further 17 ministers were sworn in on 14 February 2013. A number of nominated Ministers at the Presidency were approved by parliament on 15 February 2013.

=== Changes in government ===
President Mahama on 11 March 2013 reshuffled regional ministers he appointed into office for the first time. On 16 July 2014, Mahama had another cabinet reshuffle involving a lot of ministries. At the end of May 2014, President Mahama did a cabinet reshuffle. This resulted in Akwasi Oppong Fosu, the Local Government minister, losing his job. He was replaced by the Eastern Regional Minister, Julius Debrah. Antwi Boasiako-Sekyere was nominated to replace Julius Debrah as the Eastern Regional minister.

Cabinet (Jan 2013 - Jan 2017)
Office(s)	Officeholder	Start	End
President	John Dramani Mahama	24 July 2012	6 January 2017
Vice President	Kwesi Amissah-Arthur	6 August 2012	6 January 2017
Cabinet Ministers
Office(s)	Officeholder	Start	End
Minister for Foreign Affairs	Hanna Tetteh (MP)	30 January 2013	6 January 2017
Minister for the Interior	Kwesi Ahwoi	14 February 2013	16 July 2014
Minister for the Interior	Mark Owen Woyongo (MP)	16 July 2014	19 January 2016
Minister for the Interior	Prosper Douglas Bani	19 January 2016	6 January 2017
Minister for Finance and Economic Planning	Seth Terkper	30 January 2013	6 January 2017
Minister for Defence	Mark Owen Woyongo (MP)	14 February 2013	16 July 2014
Minister for Defence	Benjamin Kunbuor (MP)	16 July 2014	6 January 2017
Attorney General and Minister for Justice	Marietta Brew Appiah-Oppong	14 February 2013	6 January 2017
Minister for Education	Jane Naana Opoku Agyemang	2013	6 January 2017
Minister for Food and Agriculture	Clement Kofi Humado (MP)	30 January 2013	16 July 2014
Minister for Food and Agriculture	Fiifi Fiavi Kwetey (MP)	16 July 2014	6 January 2017
Minister for Trade and Industry	Haruna Iddrisu (MP)	14 February 2013	16 July 2014
Minister for Trade and Industry	Ekwow Spio-Garbrah	16 July 2014	6 January 2017
Minister for Health	Hanny-Sherry Ayittey	14 February 2013	16 July 2014
Minister for Health	Kwaku Agyemang-Mensah	16 July 2014	14 March 2015
Minister for Health	Alex Segbefia	16 March 2015	6 January 2017
Minister for Information and Media Relations (merged with Minister for Communications from 16 July 2014)	Mahama Ayariga (MP)	30 January 2013	16 July 2014 (merged with Minister for Communications from 16 July 2014)
Minister for Local Government and Rural Development	Akwasi Oppong Fosu (MP)	2013	30 May 2014
Minister for Local Government and Rural Development	Julius Debrah	30 May 2014	2015
Minister for Local Government and Rural Development	Collins Dauda	2015	6 January 2017
Minister for Tourism, Culture and Creative Arts	Elizabeth Ofosu-Agyare	14 February 2013	6 January 2017
Minister for Energy and Petroleum	Emmanuel Armah Kofi Buah (MP)	14 February 2013	6 January 2017
Minister for Transport	Dzifa Aku Ativor	14 February 2013	23 December 2015
Minister for Roads and Highways	Amin Amidu Sulemana (MP)	30 January 2013	16 July 2014
Minister for Roads and Highways	Inusah Fuseini (MP)	16 July 2014	6 January 2017
Minister for Lands and Natural Resources	Inusah Fuseini (MP)	30 January 2013	16 July 2014
Minister for Lands and Natural Resources	Nii Osah Mills	16 July 2014	6 January 2017
Minister for Communications	Edward Omane Boamah	14 February 2013	6 January 2017
Minister for Environment, Science and Technology	Joe Oteng-Adjei	2013	16 July 2014
Minister for Environment, Science and Technology	Akwasi Oppong Fosu	16 July 2014	14 March 2015
Minister for Environment, Science and Technology	Mahama Ayariga (MP)	16 March 2015	6 January 2017
Minister for Employment and Labour Relations	Nii Armah Ashitey (MP)	14 February 2013	16 July 2014
Minister for Employment and Labour Relations	Haruna Iddrisu (MP)	16 July 2014	6 January 2017
Minister for Water Resources, Works and Housing	Collins Dauda (MP)	30 January 2013	14 March 2015
Minister for Water Resources, Works and Housing	Kwaku Agyemang-Mensah	16 March 2015	6 January 2017
Minister for Fisheries and Aquaculture Development	Nayon Bilijo	14 February 2013	16 July 2014
Minister for Fisheries and Aquaculture Development	Hanny-Sherry Ayitey	16 July 2014	6 January 2017
Minister for Youth and Sports	Elvis Afriyie Ankrah	14 February 2013	16 July 2014
Minister for Youth and Sports	Mahama Ayariga (MP)	16 July 2014	14 March 2015
Minister for Youth and Sports	Mustapha Ahmed	15 March 2015	January 2016
Minister for Youth and Sports	Nii Lante Vanderpuye	January 2016	6 January 2017
Minister for Gender, Children and Social Protection	Nana Oye Lithur	2013	6 January 2017
Minister for Chieftaincy and Traditional Affairs	Henry Seidu Daanaa	14 February 2013	6 January 2017
Minister for Government Business in Parliament	Benjamin Kunbuor (MP)	14 February 2013	16 July 2014
Minister for Government Business in Parliament	Alban Bagbin (MP)	16 July 2014	6 January 2017
Minister for Power	Kwabena Donkor (MP)	2014	31 December 2015
Regional Ministers
Region	Officeholder	Start	End
Ashanti Regional Minister	Samuel Sarpong	14 February 2013	11 March 2013
Ashanti Regional Minister	Eric Opoku	11 March 2013	16 July 2014
Ashanti Regional Minister	Samuel Sarpong	16 July 2014	14 March 2015
Ashanti Regional Minister	Peter Anarfi-Mensah	16 March 2015	6 January 2017
Brong Ahafo Region	Eric Opoku	14 February 2013	11 March 2013
Brong Ahafo Region	Paul Evans Aidoo (MP)	11 March 2013	16 July 2014
Brong Ahafo Region	Eric Opoku	16 July 2014	6 January 2017
Central Regional Minister	Ebenezer Kwadwo Teye Addo	2013	11 March 2013
Central Regional Minister	Samuel Sarpong	11 March 2013	16 July 2014
Central Regional Minister	Aquinas Tawiah Quansah (MP)	16 July 2014	January 2016
Central Regional Minister	Kweku George Ricketts-Hagan (MP)	January 2016	6 January 2017
Eastern Regional Minister	Julius Debrah	2013	11 March 2013
Eastern Regional Minister	Helen Ntoso	11 March 2013	16 July 2014
Eastern Regional Minister	Antwi Boasiako Sekyere	16 July 2014	6 January 2017
Greater Accra Regional Minister	Joshua Nii Laryea Afotey-Agbo (MP)	14 February 2013	11 March 2013
Greater Accra Regional Minister	Julius Debrah	11 March 2013	16 July 2014
Greater Accra Regional Minister	Joshua Nii Laryea Afotey-Agbo (MP)	16 July 2014	6 January 2017
Northern Regional Minister	Moses Bukari Mabengba (acting)	7 January 2013	11 March 2013
Northern Regional Minister	Bede Anwataazumo Ziedeng	11 March 2013	16 July 2014
Northern Regional Minister	Limuna Mohammed Muniru	16 July 2014	6 January 2017
Upper East Region	Ephraim Avea Nsoh	2013	11 March 2013
Upper East Region	Limuna Mohammed Muniru (acting minister)	11 March 2013	16 July 2014
Upper East Region	James Zuugah Tiigah	16 July 2014	6 January 2017
Upper West Region	Bede Anwataazumo Ziedeng	2013	11 March 2013
Upper West Region	Ephraim Avea Nsoh	11 March 2013	16 July 2014
Upper West Region	Amin Amidu Sulemana (MP)	16 July 2014	6 January 2017
Volta Regional Minister	Helen Ntoso	2013	11 March 2013
Volta Regional Minister	Joshua Nii Laryea Afotey-Agbo	11 March 2013	16 July 2014
Volta Regional Minister	Helen Ntoso	16 July 2014	6 January 2017
Western Region	Paul Evans Aidoo (MP)	14 February 2013	11 March 2013
Western Region	Ebenezer Kwadwo Teye Addo	11 March 2013	16 July 2014
Western Region	Paul Evans Aidoo (MP)	16 July 2014	6 January 2017

== Ministers (July 2012 to January 2013) ==
Mahama became the President of Ghana following the sudden death of John Atta Mills on 24 July 2012. He was sworn in by the Chief Justice of Ghana Georgina Wood later the same day. A week after being sworn in as president, Mahama chose Kwesi Amissah-Arthur to be the vice president.

Cabinet (Jul 2012 - Jan 2013)
President	John Dramani Mahama	24 July 2012	6 January 2017
Vice President	Kwesi Amissah-Arthur	6 August 2012	6 January 2017
Cabinet Ministers
Office(s)	Officeholder	Start	End
Minister for Foreign Affairs and Regional Integration	Muhammad Mumuni	24 July 2012	2013
Minister for the Interior	William Kwasi Aboah	24 July 2012	6 January 2013
Minister for Finance and Economic Planning	Kwabena Dufuor	24 July 2012	6 January 2013
Minister for Defence	Lt. Gen. Joseph Henry Smith	24 July 2012	6 January 2013
Attorney General and Minister for Justice	Benjamin Kunbuor	24 July 2012	6 January 2013
Minister for Education	Lee Ocran	24 July 2012	6 January 2013
Minister for Food and Agriculture	Kwesi Ahwoi	24 July 2012	6 January 2013
Minister for Trade and Industry	Hanna Tetteh	24 July 2012	6 January 2013
Minister for Health	Alban Bagbin (MP)	24 July 2012	6 January 2013
Minister for Local Government and Rural Development	Samuel Kwame Ofosu-Ampofo	24 July 2012	6 January 2013
Minister for Tourism	Akua Sena Dansua (MP)	24 July 2012	6 January 2013
Minister for Energy	Joe Oteng-Adjei	24 July 2012	6 January 2013
Minister for Transport	Collins Dauda (MP)	24 July 2012	6 January 2013
Minister for Roads and Highways	Joe Kwashie Gidisu (MP)	24 July 2012	6 January 2013
Minister for Lands and Natural Resources	Mike Allen Hammah (MP)	24 July 2012	6 January 2013
Minister for Women and Children's Affairs	Juliana Azumah-Mensah (MP)	24 July 2012	6 January 2013
Minister for Communications	Haruna Iddrisu	24 July 2012	6 January 2013
Minister for Environment, Science and Technology	Sherry Ayitey	24 July 2012	6 January 2013
Minister for Information	Fritz Baffour (MP)	24 July 2012	6 January 2013
Minister for Employment and Social Welfare	Moses Asaga (MP)	24 July 2012	6 January 2013
Minister for Water Resources, Works and Housing	Enoch Teye Mensah (MP)	24 July 2012	6 January 2013
Minister for Youth and Sports	Clement Kofi Humado (MP)	24 July 2012	6 January 2013
Minister for Chieftaincy and Culture	Alexander Asum-Ahensah (MP)	24 July 2012	6 January 2013
Regional Ministers
Region	Officeholder	Start	End
Ashanti Regional Minister	Kwaku Agyemang-Mensah	24 July 2012	6 January 2013
Brong Ahafo Region	Kwadwo Nyamekye Marfo	24 July 2012	6 January 2013
Central Regional Minister	Ama Benyiwa-Doe	24 July 2012	6 January 2013
Eastern Regional Minister	Victor Emmanuel Smith	24 July 2012	6 January 2013
Greater Accra Regional Minister	Nii Armah Ashitey	24 July 2012	6 January 2013
Northern Regional Minister	Moses Magbenba	24 July 2012	6 January 2013
Upper East Region	Mark Woyongo (MP)	24 July 2012	6 January 2013
Upper West Region	Amin Amidu Sulemana	24 July 2012	6 January 2013
Volta Regional Minister	Henry Ford Kamel (MP)	24 July 2012	25 Dec 2012
Western Region	Paul Evans Aidoo (MP)	24 July 2012	6 January 2013

=== Changes in government ===
Henry Kamel, Volta Regional Minister, died on Christmas Day 2012 after diabetes complications.

This set of ministers had all been appointed by President Mills and continued until January 2013, when his term would have ended. The exception was Henry Kamel, who died after the 7 December election but before the formal handover on 7 January 2013. The ministers were advised to stay on as caretaker ministers until new ones had been confirmed in their place.

== See also ==
- National Democratic Congress
- Rawlings government
- List of Mills government ministers

Preceded by Mills government (2009–2012)	Government of Ghana; 2012 – 2017	Succeeded by Akufo-Addo government (2017 – 2025)
