= Minister for Environment, Science and Technology =

The 'Minister for Environment, Science and Technology in Ghana is responsible for providing political leadership for the ministry. The ministry was set up in 1994 following the 1992 United Nations Conference on Environment and Development. As part of the Agenda 21 global action plan for sustainable development, the ministry was set up by the Ghana Government to enable sustainable environmental management, and science and technological development in the country. Between 2006 and 2009, the ministry was dissolved and its functions reassigned to other ministries but it was reconstituted after 3 years.

The current Minister is Zanetor Agyeman-Rawlings who was appointed by President Mahama in August 2026. The position had been vacant since the previous minister, Ibrahim Murtala Muhammed died in a helicopter crash in August 2025.

== List of ministers ==
Number	Minister	Took office	Left office	Government	Party
1	Christine Amoako-Nuamah	1994	January 1997	Rawlings government	National Democratic Congress
2	Cletus Avoka	January 1997	January 2021	Rawlings government	National Democratic Congress
3	Dominic Fobih	2001	2003	Kufuor government	New Patriotic Party
4	Kasim Kasanga (Minister for Science and Environment)	1 April 2003	January 2005	Kufuor government	New Patriotic Party
5	Christine Churcher (Minister for Science and Environment)	17 February 2005	28 April 2006	Kufuor government	New Patriotic Party
6	Stephen Asamoah Boateng (Minister for Local Government, Rural Development and Environment)	8 June 2006	2007	Kufuor government	New Patriotic Party
7	Kwadwo Adjei-Darko (Minister for Local Government, Rural Development and Environment)	2007	January 2009	Kufuor government	New Patriotic Party
8	Sherry Ayittey	February 2009	24 July 2012	Mills government	National Democratic Congress
8	Sherry Ayittey	24 July 2012	6 January 2013	Mahama government	National Democratic Congress
9	Joe Oteng-Adjei	February 2013	16 July 2014	Mahama government	National Democratic Congress
10	Akwasi Oppong Fosu	16 July 2014	14 March 2015	Mahama government	National Democratic Congress
11	Mahama Ayariga (MP)	16 March 2015	6 January 2017	Mahama government	National Democratic Congress
12	Kwabena Frimpong-Boateng	8 February 2017	6 January 2021	Akufo-Addo government	New Patriotic Party
13	Kwaku Afriyie	March 2021	14 February 2024	Akufo-Addo government	New Patriotic Party
14	Ophelia Hayford (MP)	14 February 2024	6 January 2025	Akufo-Addo government	New Patriotic Party
15	Ibrahim Murtala Muhammed (MP)	7 February 2025	6 August 2025	Mahama 2nd government	National Democratic Congress
16	Zanetor Agyeman-Rawlings (MP)	29 August 2026	Incumbent	Mahama 2nd government	National Democratic Congress
