= Central Regional Minister =

The Central Regional Minister is the Ghana government official who is responsible for overseeing the administration of the Central Region of Ghana. The area currently covered by the Central Region used to be part of the Western Province in the Gold Coast under British colonial rule. The Western Province which had become the Western Region after Ghana became an independent country was split into the Western and Central Regions. The seat of the regional administration is located in Cape Coast, the capital.

== List of Central Regional Ministers ==
Number	Minister	Took office	Left office	Government	Party
1	Joseph Essilfie Hagan (MP)	October 1960	1965	Nkrumah government	Convention Peoples' Party
2	Emmanuel Humphrey Tettey Korboe (MP)	1965	February 1966	Nkrumah government	Convention Peoples' Party
3	Lt.-Colonel R. J. G. Dontoh	1966	1967	Military government	National Liberation Council
4	Brig. Alexander A. Crabbe	1967	1969	Military government	National Liberation Council
5	Jonah Abraham Annobil (MP)	1969	January 1972	Busia government	Progress Party
6	Colonel Frank Bernasko	1972	1973	Military government	National Redemption Council
7	Commander Joy Amedume	1973	1974	Military government	National Redemption Council
8	Lt. Colonel E. A. Baidoo	1974	October 1975	Military government	National Redemption Council
9	Major J. A. Awuni	1975	1977	Military government	Supreme Military Council
10	Commander John A. K. Otoo	1977	1978	Military government	Supreme Military Council
11	Lt. Colonel William Adjei Thompson	1978	1979	Military government	Supreme Military Council
12	Kobena Gyapea Erbynn	1979	1979	Military government	Armed Forces Revolutionary Council
13	Kankam da Costa	?	?	Limann government	People's National Party
14		1979	?	Military government	Provisional National Defence Council
15	Ato Austin	1988	1993	Military government	Provisional National Defence Council
16	Ebenezer Kobina Fosu	?	?	Rawlings government	National Democratic Congress
17	Kojo Yankah (MP)	1997	1998	Rawlings government	National Democratic Congress
18	Jacob Arthur			Rawlings government	National Democratic Congress
19	Isaac Edumadze	2001	2006	Kufuor government	New Patriotic Party
20	Nana Ato Arthur	2006	2009	Kufuor government	New Patriotic Party
21	Ama Benyiwa-Doe	2009	2012	Mills government	National Democratic Congress
22	Ama Benyiwa-Doe	2012	2013	Mahama government	National Democratic Congress
23	Ebenezer Kwadwo Teye Addo	2013	2013	Mahama government	National Democratic Congress
24	Samuel Sarpong	2013	2014	Mahama government	National Democratic Congress
25	Aquinas Tawiah Quansah (MP)	2014	2016	Mahama government	National Democratic Congress
26	Kweku George Ricketts-Hagan (MP)	2016	2017	Mahama government	National Democratic Congress
27	Kwamena Duncan	2017	6 January 2025	Akufo-Addo government	New Patriotic Party
28	Eduamoah Ekow Panyin Okyere	7 Feb 2025	Incumbent	Mahama Second Term	National Democratic Congress

== See also ==
- Ministers of the Ghanaian Government
- Central Region
