= Kalyppo =

Manufactured fruit juice product

Kalyppo is a fruit juice manufactured by the Ghanaian company Aquafresh Limited. It is the preferred locally manufactured juice box for teens and young adults. The makers of Kalyppo also manufacture Frutelli.

== Popularity ==
In October 2016, New Patriotic Party presidential candidate Nana Akuffo Addo was pictured sipping the drink. The photo went viral and faithfuls of the political party took to social media, posting pictures with Kalyppo boxes in hand in support of Nana Akuffo Addo. This boosted Kalyppo's popularity and sales.

== Controversy ==
The Chief of Staff of Ghana Julius Debrah, speaking at a campaign in the Brong-Ahafo Region, urged people to stop consuming Kalyppo because it contained sugar. and therefore was not healthy. This created a major public outcry, mainly from the opposition New Patriotic Party supporters and some well meaning Ghanaians.
