= Julius Debrah =

Ghanaian politician

The Honourable Dr. Julius Debrah
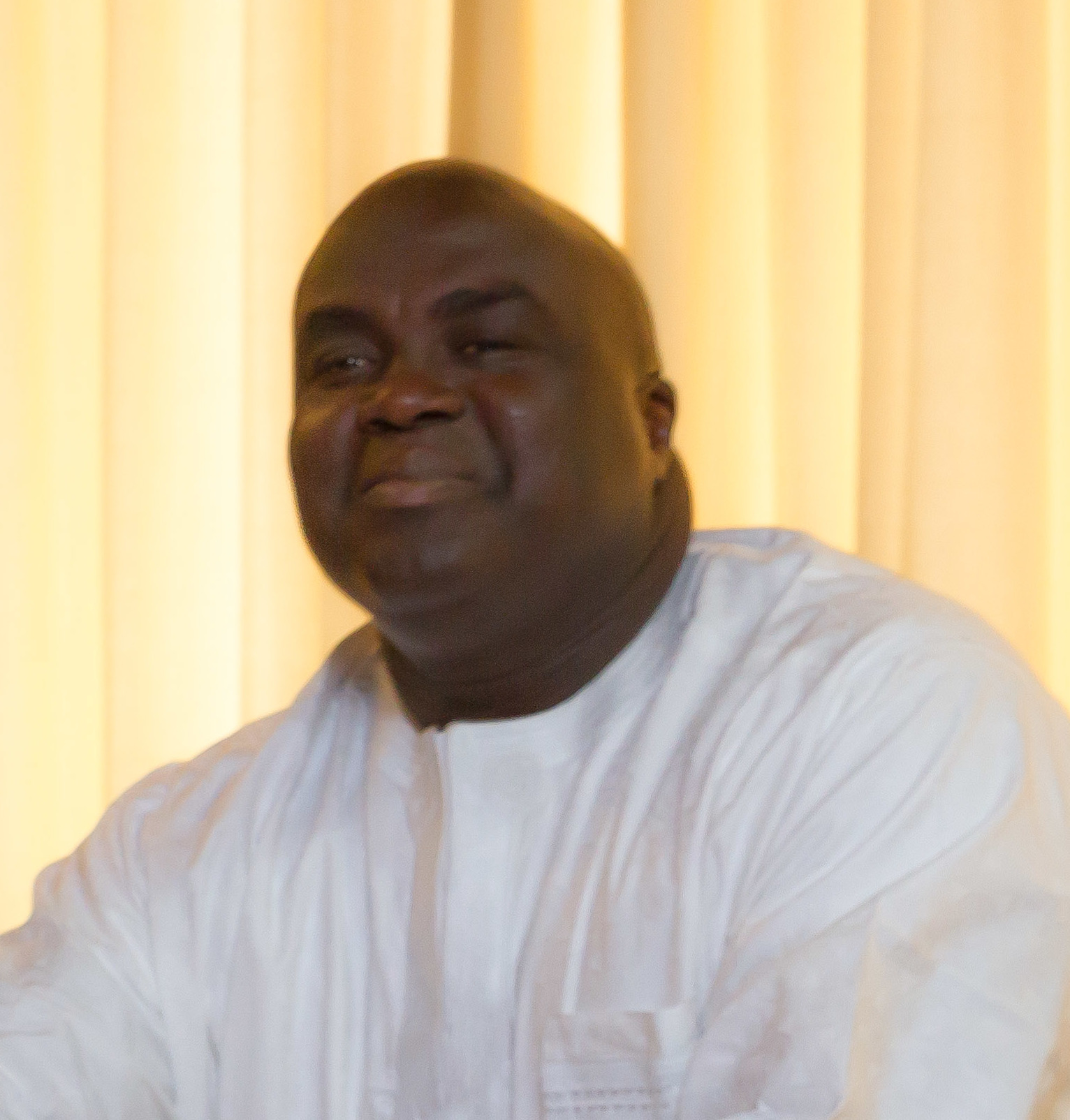

Chief of Staff to the President of Ghana
- Incumbent
- Assumed office 7 January 2025
- President: John Mahama
- Preceded by: Frema Opare
- In office 15 February 2015 – 7 January 2017
- President: John Mahama
- Preceded by: Prosper Douglas Bani
- Succeeded by: Frema Opare

Minister for Local Government and Rural Development
- In office 30 May 2014 – 15 February 2015
- President: John Mahama
- Preceded by: Akwasi Oppong Fosu
- Succeeded by: Collins Dauda

Eastern Regional Minister
- In office March 2014 – 30 May 2014
- President: John Mahama
- Preceded by: Helen Ntoso
- Succeeded by: Antwi Boasiako Sekyere
- In office February 2013 – 11 March 2013
- President: John Mahama
- Preceded by: Victor Emmanuel Smith
- Succeeded by: Helen Ntoso

Greater Accra Regional Minister
- In office 11 March 2013 – March 2014
- President: John Mahama
- Preceded by: Nii Laryea Afotey-Agbo
- Succeeded by: Nii Laryea Afotey-Agbo

Personal details
- Born: 24 April 1966 (age 60) Ghana
- Party: National Democratic Congress
- Education: University of Ghana (BA), Doctor of Philosophy
- Occupation: Politician; social developer

Julius Debrah (born 24 April 1966) is a Ghanaian politician and chief of staff to the President of Ghana, John Dramani Mahama. He is a member of the National Democratic Congress. He is the current Chief of Staff of the Republic of Ghana. In February 2015, he was appointed chief of staff after the former, Prosper Douglas Bani was removed from office and assigned as Ambassador Extraordinaire and Plenipotentiary. Debrah previously held the positions of Minister of Local Government and Rural Development and Regional Minister for Eastern Region.

== Education ==
Debrah studied at Mpraeso Secondary School, then moved to Achimota School for A Levels from 1987 to 1989. Following this, he gained admission to the University of Ghana, where he obtained a Bachelor of Arts in Archaeology and Sociology. In July 2026, he obtained a doctorate degree in Museum and Heritage Studies from the University of Ghana.

== Politics ==
=== As Parliamentary Candidate ===
In the 2000 Ghana Elections, he stood as a parliamentary candidate in the Suhum (Ghana parliament constituency) and lost to Ransford Agyapong, the New Patriotic Party candidate, by gaining 12,368 of the votes cast, representing 41.20% whilst the winner got 16,494 votes, representing 54.90%. In 2004, he again stood for the parliamentary seat in the Suhum (Ghana parliament constituency) and lost to the New Patriotic Party's Frederick Opare-Ansah, who got 21,720 votes representing 55.20% against his 17,125 votes representing 43.50%.

In 2012, when his party (NDC) was in power, he once again stood for the parliamentary candidate for the Suhum (Ghana parliament constituency) seat and lost by 388 votes, the closest he had come in the three times he had stood for the parliamentary seat. He lost to the incumbent rival from the 2004 Elections, Frederick Opare-Ansah, who got 24,046 votes representing 49.28% whilst he got 23,658 representing 48.49%.

=== Ghana Tourism Authority ===
In 2009, he was appointed as the chief executive officer of the Ghana Tourism Authority. He served in that role from 2009 to January 2013. In mid-2011, under his leadership and the Ministry of Tourism, the then Ghana Tourist Board was reshaped into the Ghana Tourism Authority to enhance its role in promoting tourism in Ghana through the Parliament of Ghana's passage of ACT 817.

=== Minister of State ===
==== Regional Minister ====
In February 2013, Debrah was nominated by John Dramani Mahama to serve in the position of Eastern Regional Minister. After a month, he was moved from the Eastern Region to the capital region, Greater Accra to serve as the Greater Accra Regional Minister.

He served in that role for a year and was seen as someone championing the involvement of the local government in nation-building.

"Governance is about satisfying the needs of the people. This makes local government highly influential since it is basically practiced at the grass-roots level”.

— Debrah on the importance of Local government in nation building during his maiden visit to the Kpone Katamanso District Assembly on 24 April 2013.

==== Minister for Local Government and Rural Development ====
Debrah was appointed to serve as Minister in charge of Local Government and Rural Development after serving as regional minister for both the Greater Accra Region and Eastern Region. This was seen by experts as a move to ensure the massive involvement of the local authorities and people in decision-making and nation-building.

=== Chief of Staff ===
In February 2015, Julius Debrah was appointed Chief of Staff by President John Mahama to replace Prosper Bani after serving as the Minister of Local Government and Rural Development the one year prior. Debrah's appointment was received with joy by members of the National Democratic Congress. In January 2025, he was appointed as the chief of staff by John Mahama, who was elected president for his second term in 2024.

== Personal life ==
A native of Obomeng Kwahu, Debrah is married with two children.

Political offices
Preceded by Akwasi Oppong Fosu	Minister for Local Government and Rural Development; May 2014–February 2015	Succeeded by Collins Dauda
