= Helen Ntoso =

Ghanaian politician

Hon. Helen Adjoa Ntoso MP
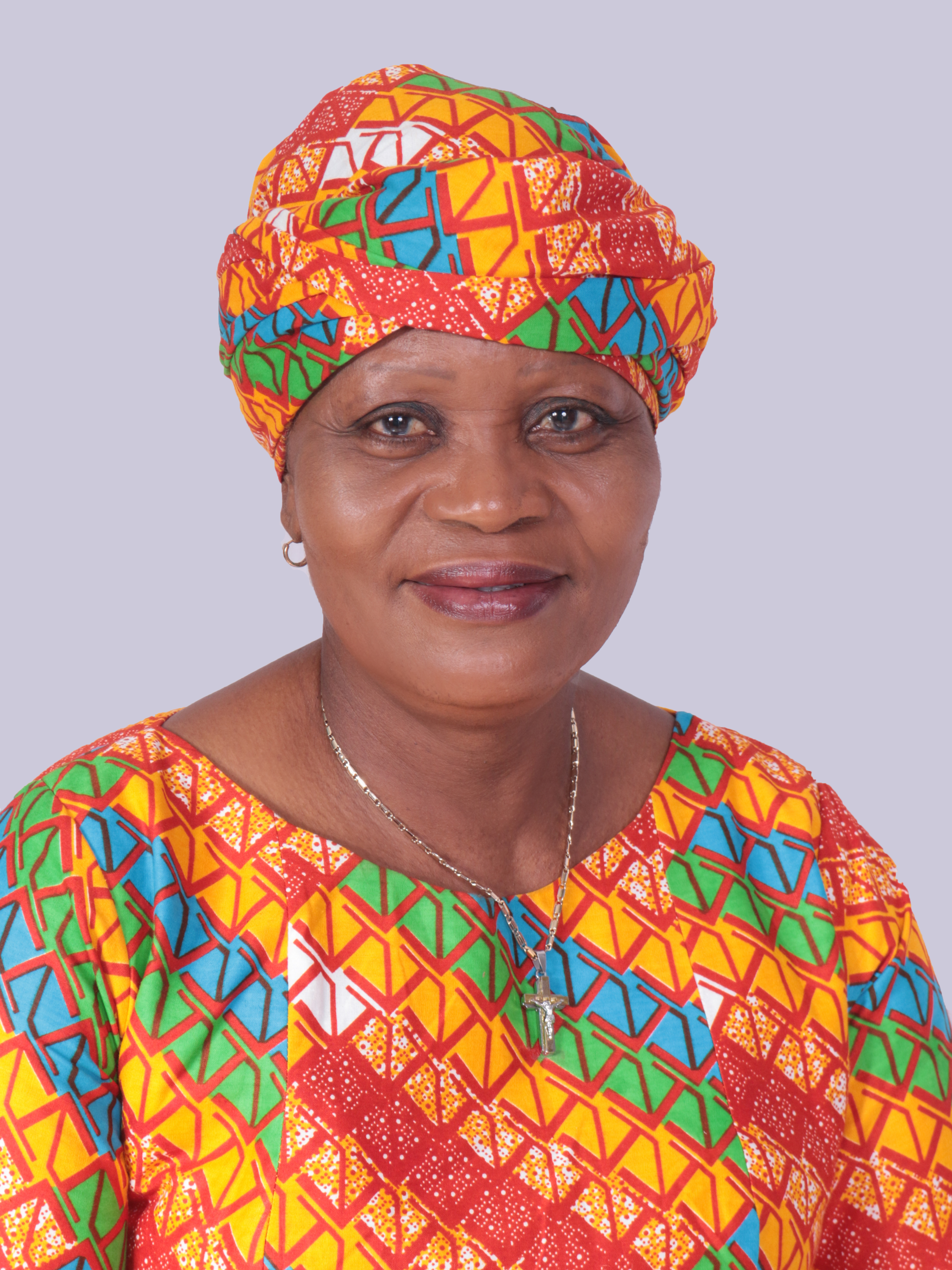

Member of the Ghana Parliament for Krachi West
- Incumbent
- Assumed office 7 January 2013
- Preceded by: Francis Yaw Osei Sarfo

Volta Regional Minister
- In office 16 July 2014 – 6 January 2017
- President: John Mahama
- Preceded by: Nii Laryea Afotey-Agbo
- Succeeded by: Archibald Letsa

Eastern Regional Minister
- In office 11 March 2013 – 16 July 2014
- President: John Mahama
- Preceded by: Julius Debrah
- Succeeded by: Antwi Boasiako Sekyere

Volta Regional Minister
- In office January 2013 – 11 March 2013
- President: John Mahama
- Preceded by: Henry Ford Kamel
- Succeeded by: Nii Laryea Afotey-Agbo

Personal details
- Born: Helen Adjoa Ntoso; February 1958 (age 68) Ghana
- Party: NDC
- Education: Kofi Annan International Peacekeeping Training Centre
- Cabinet: Minister
- Committees: Gender and Children Committee Defence and Interior Committee

Helen Adjoa Ntoso (born February 1958) is a Ghanaian politician and a member of the Eighth Parliament of the Fourth Republic of Ghana to representing Krachi West constituency in the Volta Region of Ghana. She is a member of the National Democratic Congress. Hon Ntoso is a former Regional Minister for the Volta and Eastern Regions in the NDC government of President Mahama.

== Early life and education ==
Ntoso is from Kete Krachi which was located in the Volta Region until December 2018 when new regions were created. It is now in the Oti Region. She completed her post-secondary education at St Francis Training College. She has an Advanced Diploma in Education from Lambeth College in London. She also holds a Master of Arts in Conflict Peace and Security from Kofi Annan International Peacekeeping Training Centre.

== Career ==
She was a Senior Child Care taker at Elizabeth Hamwod Nursery School from 2005 to 2007. She was a Missionary for Bright Church Army from 2003 to 2005. She was also the Director of Operations at NADMO 2009 to 2012.

== Political career ==
Ntoso won the Krachi West seat in the 2012 Ghanaian general election. She retained her seat in the 2016, 2020 and 2024 elections. She was appointed Volta Regional Minister by President John Mahama in 2013. She was made the Eastern Regional Minister in a cabinet reshuffle in March 2013. She was the Volta Regional Minister in 2015. In July 2014, she was redesignated as Volta Regional Minister, a position she held until the end of the Mahama NDC government on 6 January 2017.

== Awards ==
Helen Ntoso won an award for Regional Minister of the Year 2015, organized by West African International Magazine.

Political offices
Preceded by Nii Laryea Afotey-Agbo	Volta Regional Minister; 2014— 2017	Succeeded by Archibald Letsa
Preceded by Julius Debrah	Eastern Regional Minister; 2013— 2014	Succeeded by Antwi Boasiako Sekyere
Preceded by Henry Ford Kamel	Volta Regional Minister; 2013 — 2013	Succeeded by Nii Laryea Afotey-Agbo
