= Krachi West (Ghana parliament constituency) =

Ghana parliament constituency

- constituency for the Parliament of Ghana
- District: Krachi District
- Region: Oti Region of Ghana

Current constituency
- Party: National Democratic Congress
- MP: Helen Ntoso

Krachi West is one of the constituencies represented in the Parliament of Ghana. It elects one Member of Parliament (MP) by the first past the post system of election. Krachi West is located in the Krachi district of the Oti Region of Ghana.

== Boundaries ==
The seat is located within the Krachi West district of the Oti Region of Ghana. It covers the whole of the new Krachi West District. To the east is the Krachi East constituency in the Krachi East District. It also shares a short border with the Nkwanta South to the north east. Its western neighbour is the Sene constituency in the Sene District of the Brong Ahafo Region. Its northern neighbour is the East Gonja District in the Northern Region.

== History ==
The boundaries of this constituency were changed prior to the Ghanaian parliamentary election in 2004 when the Krachi constituency was split into the Krachi West and the Krachi East constituencies respectively due to the creation of the new Krachi East District from the Krachi district.

== Members of Parliament ==
Election	Member	Party
1992	Constituency known as Krachi	
1996	Sampson Kwadwo Apraku	National Democratic Congress
2000	Francis Yaw Osei Sarfo	National Democratic Congress
2004	Constituency altered from Krachi to Krachi West	
2004	Francis Yaw Osei Sarfo	National Democratic Congress
2012	Helen Adjoa Ntoso	National Democratic Congress

== Elections ==
2024 Ghanaian general election: South Dayi
Party	Candidate	Votes	%	±%
NDC	Helen Ntoso	13,169	54.64	—
NPP	Justice Amankwa Mensah	10,934	45.36	—
Liberal Party of Ghana	Charles Bisi Gyamgbuja	0	0.00	—
Majority		2,235	9.28	—
Turnout				
Registered electors				

2004 Ghanaian parliamentary election:Krachi West Source:Electoral Commission of Ghana
Party	Candidate	Votes	%	±%
National Democratic Congress	Francis Yaw Osei Sarfo	15,687	44.9	N/A
New Patriotic Party	Kofi Mensah Demitia	8,861	25.4	N/A
People's National Convention	Kofi Tarkum	8,056	23	N/A
Independent	Alhajii Abu Safianu Baba	1,773	5.1	N/A
Independent	Sampson Kwadwo Apraku Independent	454	1.3	N/A
Independent	Owusu Kwasi Michael	121	0.3	N/A
Majority		6,826	19.5	N/A
Turnout		21,222	87.2	N/A

2000 Ghanaian parliamentary election:Krachi Source:Adam Carr's Election Archives
Party	Candidate	Votes	%	±%
National Democratic Congress	Francis Yaw Osei Sarfo	32,368	72.6	N/A
New Patriotic Party	Kofi Mensah Demitia	7,879	17.7	N/A
National Reform Party	Frank Kwadwo Gyefour	4,338	9.7	N/A
Majority		24,489	54.9	N/A

== See also ==
- List of Ghana Parliament constituencies
