= Archibald Letsa =

Ghanaian politician

The Honourable Archibald Letsa

Volta Regional Minister
- Incumbent
- Assumed office February 2017
- President: Nana Akuffo-Addo
- Preceded by: Helen Ntoso
- Succeeded by: James Gunu

Personal details
- Born: Ghana
- Party: New Patriotic Party

Archibald Yao Letsa is a Ghanaian politician and a member of the New Patriotic Party in Ghana. He was the Volta Regional minister of Ghana. He was appointed by President Nana Addo Danquah Akuffo-Addo in January 2017 and was approved by the Members of Parliament in February 2017.

== Education ==
Letsa had his secondary school education at St. Peter's Boys Senior High School Nkwatia Kwahu Ghana.
