= List of Mills government ministers =

Government of Ghana 2009–2012

This is a listing of the ministers who served in the National Democratic Congress government of John Atta Mills in Ghana following its inauguration on 7 January 2009 after his victory in the 2008 Ghanaian general election held in December 2008. The government was in power for less than the four years stipulated.

The Mills presidency ended on 24 July 2012 when President John Atta Mills died following illness. Mills was succeeded by his vice president, John Dramani Mahama as specified by the Ghana constitution.

John Mahama was sworn in on the same day by the Chief Justice of Ghana and he continued with most of the ministers from this government. The change happened just months before the 2012 Ghanaian general election scheduled for December 2012.

== List of ministers ==
Office(s)	Officeholder	Start	End
President	John Atta Mills	2009	2012
Vice President	John Dramani Mahama	2009	2012
Cabinet Ministers
Office(s)	Officeholder	Start	End
Minister for Foreign Affairs and Regional Integration	Muhammad Mumuni	2009	2012
Minister for the Interior	Cletus Avoka (MP)	2009	2010
Minister for the Interior	Martin A. B. K. Amidu	2010	2011
Minister for the Interior	Benjamin Kunbuor	2011	2012
Minister for the Interior	William Kwasi Aboah	2012	2012
Minister for Finance and Economic Planning	Kwabena Duffuor	2009	2012
Minister for Defence	Lt. Gen. Joseph Henry Smith	2009	2012
Attorney General and Minister for Justice	Mrs. Betty Mould-Iddrisu	2009	2011
Attorney General and Minister for Justice	Martin Amidu	2011	2012
Attorney General and Minister for Justice	Benjamin Kunbuor	2012	2012
Minister for Education	Alex Tettey-Enyo (MP)	2009	2011
Minister for Education	Mrs. Betty Mould-Iddrisu	2011	2012
Minister for Education	Lee Ocran	2012	2012
Minister for Food and Agriculture	Kwesi Ahwoi	2009	2012
Minister for Trade and Industry	Hanna Tetteh	2009	2012
Minister for Health	George Sipa-Adjah Yankey	2009	2009
Minister for Health	Benjamin Kunbuor	2009	2011
Minister for Health	Joseph Yieleh Chireh (MP)	2011	2012
Minister for Health	Alban Bagbin (MP)	2012	2012
Minister for Local Government and Rural Development	Joseph Yieleh Chireh (MP)	2009	2011
Minister for Local Government and Rural Development	Samuel Kwame Ofosu-Ampofo	2011	2012
Minister for Tourism	Juliana Azumah-Mensah (MP)	2009	2010
Minister for Tourism	Zita Okaikoi	2010	2011
Minister for Tourism	Akua Sena Dansua (MP)	2011	2012
Minister for Energy	Joe Oteng-Adjei	2009	2012
Minister for Transport	Mike Allen Hammah (MP)	2009	2011
Minister for Transport	Collins Dauda (MP)	2011	2012
Minister for Roads and Highways	Joe Kwashie Gidisu (MP)	2009	2012
Minister for Lands and Natural Resources	Collins Dauda (MP)	2009	2011
Minister for Lands and Natural Resources	Mike Allen Hammah (MP)	2011	2012
Minister for Women and Children's Affairs	Akua Sena Dansua (MP)	2009	2010
Minister for Women and Children's Affairs	Juliana Azumah-Mensah (MP)	2010	2012
Minister for Communications	Haruna Iddrisu	2009	2012
Minister for Environment, Science and Technology	Sherry Ayitey	2009	2012
Minister for Information	Zita Okaikoi	2009	2010
Minister for Information	John Tia (MP)	2010	2012
Minister for Information	Fritz Baffour (MP)	2012	2012
Minister for Employment and Social Welfare	Stephen Amoanor Kwao (MP)	2009	2010
Minister for Employment and Social Welfare	Enoch Teye Mensah (MP)	2010	2012
Minister for Employment and Social Welfare	Moses Asaga (MP)	2012	2012
Minister for Water Resources, Works and Housing	Albert Abongo (MP)	2009	2010
Minister for Water Resources, Works and Housing	Alban Bagbin (MP)	2010	2012
Minister for Water Resources, Works and Housing	Enoch Teye Mensah (MP)	2012	2012
Minister for Youth and Sports	Muntaka Mohammed Mubarak (MP)	2009	2009
Minister for Youth and Sports	Abdul-Rashid Pelpuo (MP)	2009	2010
Minister for Youth and Sports	Akua Sena Dansua (MP)	2010	2011
Minister for Youth and Sports	Clement Kofi Humado (MP)	2011	2012
Minister for Chieftaincy and Culture	Alexander Asum-Ahensah (MP)	2009	2012
Regional Ministers
Region	Officeholder	Start	End
Ashanti Regional Minister	Kofi Opoku-Manu	2009	2011
Ashanti Regional Minister	Dr. Kwaku Agyemang-Mensah	2011	2012
Brong Ahafo Region	Kwadwo Nyamekye Marfo	2009	2012
Central Regional Minister	Ama Benyiwa-Doe	2009	2012
Eastern Regional Minister	Samuel Kwame Ofosu-Ampofo	2009	2011
Eastern Regional Minister	Dr Kwasi Akyem Apea-Kubi	2011	2012
Eastern Regional Minister	Victor Emmanuel Smith	2012	2012
Greater Accra Regional Minister	Nii Armah Ashitey	2009	2012
Northern Regional Minister	S. S. Nanyina	2009	2010
Northern Regional Minister	Moses Bukari Mabengba	2010	2012
Upper East Region	Mark Woyongo	2009	2012
Upper West Region	Mahmud Khalid	2009	2010
Upper West Region	Issaku Saliah	2010	2012
Upper West Region	Amin Amidu Sulemana	2012	2012
Volta Regional Minister	Joseph Amenowode (MP)	2009	2012
Volta Regional Minister	Henry Ford Kamel (MP)	2012	2012
Western Region	Paul Evans Aidoo (MP)	2009	2012
Ministers of State
Office(s)	Officeholder	Start	End
Minister at the Presidency	Alhassan Azong	2009	2012
Minister at the Presidency	Mrs Hautie Dubie Alhassan	2009	2012
Minister at the Presidency	Amadu Seidu	2009	2009
Minister at the Presidency	Stephen Amoanor Kwao (MP)	2010	2012
Minister at the Presidency	Rafatu Halutie A. Dubie	?	2012
Minister at the Presidency	Dominic Azimbe Azumah (MP)	2012	2012

== Mills' government changes ==
=== 2009 ===
The first batch of ministers in the NDC government were sworn in on 13 January 2009. Betty Mould-Iddrisu who was initially out of the country was later sworn in as Ghana's first female Attorney General and Minister for Justice.

Muntaka Mohammed Mubarak, the minister for sports, resigned on 25 June 2009 following findings of financial impropriety against him by a committee set up by government. Two additional ministers, Dr. George Yankey, Minister for Health and Ahmed Seidu, Minister at the Presidency tended their resignations on 10 October 2009, following allegations of having accepted bribes from a United Kingdom company many years prior to the formation of this government. Both ministers claim to be innocent of the allegations and are to be investigated by the Commission on Human Rights and Administrative Justice at the request of President Mills.

=== 2010 ===
On 25 January 2010, President Mills conducted his first cabinet reshuffle. There were changes of ministers in 7 ministries and one change of regional minister. In all, four new ministers came into government including Alban Bagbin, the Majority Leader in parliament and his deputy, John Tia. Also in were Enoch T. Mensah, a former minister in the Rawlings NDC government and Martin Amidu, the new Interior minister.

On 11 May 2010, Mahmud Khalid, the Upper West Regional Minister was dismissed by President Mills. Khalid suggested members of his party lobbied for his dismissal. Alhaji Issaku Saliah, a former MP for Wa West was nominated as his replacement and approved by parliament on 23 July 2010.

=== 2011 ===
The second cabinet reshuffle by President Mills was in January 2011. 9 ministries were affected in all. One Regional minister was also changed. Notable changes including replacing Betty Mould-Iddrisu with Martin Amidu as Attorney-General. Zita Okaikoi and Alex Tettey-Enyo were dropped from government.

=== 2012 ===
In January 2012, Martin Amidu was sacked by President Mills. This followed allegations he made suggesting some members of the ruling party may be corrupt. He was asked to substantiate his allegations by Mills and subsequently sacked ostensibly because he was unable to do so. A few days later, Betty Mould-Iddrissu, Minister for Education who was the Attorney-General before Amidu tended her resignation as Minister for Education. This was accepted by President Mills who appointed Enoch Mensah to replace her as Minister for Education temporarily. A cabinet reshuffle was announced a few days later via a press release from the Office of the President. There were new ministers nominated for approval by parliament. These include William Kwasi Aboah for Interior, Lee Ocran for Education, Fritz Baffour MP for Ablekuma South for Information, Moses Asaga for Employment and Social Welfare, Dominic Azimbe Azumah, MP for Garu - Timpane – Minister of State and Amin Amidu Sulemani, Upper West Regional Minister designate. They were all sworn in on 24 February 2012 by President Mills after having been approved by the Parliament of Ghana. On 26 March 2012, President Mills appointed two new regional ministers. The former ambassador to the Czech Republic, Victor Emmanuel Smith became the new Eastern Region Minister and the MP for Buem, Henry Kamel Ford became the new Volta Region Minister.

== Death of President Mills ==
On 25 July 25 2012, President Mills was taken ill and died a few hours afterwards at the 37 Military Hospital in Accra.

== See also ==
- National Democratic Congress
- Rawlings government
- Presidency of John Atta Mills

Preceded by Kufuor government (2001–2009)	Government of Ghana; 2009 – 2012	Succeeded by Mahama government (2012–2017)
