= Ebenezer Kwadwo Teye Addo =

Ghanaian politician (died 2024)

Hon. Ebenezer Kwadwo Teye Addo

Western Regional Minister
- In office 11 March 2013 – 16 July 2014
- President: John Mahama
- Preceded by: Paul Evans Aidoo
- Succeeded by: Paul Evans Aidoo

Central Regional Minister
- In office 2013 – 11 March 2013
- President: John Dramani Mahama
- Preceded by: Ama Benyiwa-Doe
- Succeeded by: Samuel Sarpong

Personal details
- Born: {June 21, 1948 Ghana
- Died: 17 September 2024 Ghana
- Party: NDC

Ebenezer Kwadwo Teye Addo (died 17 September 2024) was a Ghanaian politician and the Central Regional Minister of Ghana. After heading the Central Region, he was moved to the Western Region as the new Regional Minister. He served in John Mahama's government in 2013.

== Birth and early childhood ==
Born at Kojo Beedu in Winneba to Opanyin Kwame Addo of Apam in the Central Region, and Madam Akorshikor Akorli of Dzelukope in the Volta Region of Ghana, Ebenezer Kwodwo Teye Addo was the 6th of Nine (9) children of his parents. He was of the Takyina Aboradze Royal Family of Apam. His father was a renowned Mason Contractor, while the mother engaged in Petty Trading to support the family.

Neither of his parents had Formal Education, but wanted to educate their nine children. He was enrolled at the Anglican Primary School at Winneba at a young age. He progressed to the Urban Council Middle ‘A’ School, also at Winneba, where he successfully completed his Form Four Education and obtained the Middle School Leaving Certificate (MSLC), with a Distinction, in 1965. He proceeded to the Sefwi Wiawso Training College in 1966, a year after completing his Elementary Education, and passed out as a Certificate ‘A’ (4YR) Profession Teacher in 1970, where he became known by his initials EKT. He pursued a One- Year Programme at the former Advanced Teachers’ Training College at Winneba between 1978 and 1979, and left for the University of Cape Coast (UCC), where he obtained a Diploma in Religious Studies, and a Bachelor of Education (B.Ed) Degree in 1982 with a 2nd Class Upper Honors Division. He continued with an M.Ed in Educational Administration at the Institute for Educational Planning and Administration (I.E,P,A) at the University of Cape Coast, Cape Coast. Ebenezer Kwodwo Teye Addo enrolled at the Ghana School of law in 2004, obtained his Barrister At Law (BL) Degree, and was called to the Bar in 2007.

== Working experience ==
He died on 17 September 2024.
