= Prosper Douglas Bani =

Chief of Staff of Ghana

Hon. Prosper Douglas Bani

Minister of Interior
- In office January 2016 – January 2017
- President: John Dramani Mahama
- Preceded by: Mark Woyongo
- Succeeded by: Ambrose Dery

Chief of Staff
- In office January 2013 – February 2015
- Preceded by: John Henry Martey Newman
- Succeeded by: Julius Debrah
- President: John Dramani Mahama

Personal details
- Born: Prosper Douglas Kwaku Bani
- Party: National Democratic Congress
- Education: University of Ghana; Institute of Social Studies; University of Oslo; University of Texas
- Profession: International aid and development expert, Politician

Prosper Douglas Kwaku Bani (born 17 September 1958) is a Ghanaian international aid and development manager and politician who is a former Chief of staff of Ghana and a former Minister for Interior. He is a senior manager and specialist in international peace-building and development processes. For over 15 years, he led innovative processes in peace and development with the United Nations in several locations, worldwide.

== Early life and education ==
Bani is native Kpando a town in the Volta region of Ghana and he is an Ewe by tribe. He holds a Bachelor of Arts degree in Political Science and Sociology from the University of Ghana, Legon in 1981. He furthered his education at the Institute of Social Studies, The Hague, Netherlands, where he completed in 1989 with a Master of Arts in Development Studies: Politics and Development Strategies. In 1991 he obtained a certificate of achievement in International Development Studies from University of Oslo, Norway. He obtained a Master of Arts, majoring in Comparative Politics and Government in 1994 from the University of Texas at Austin, USA, Master of Arts, 1994 Major: Comparative Politics and Government.

He currently serves as the National Security Advisor to the president of Ghana, John Dramani Mahama.

== Career ==
=== Lecturer ===
He started his career as a lecturer at the Ghana Institute of Journalism where he worked from 1984 to 1992. Within that period he rose to become a senior lecturer and Director of studies through that role he contributed to the training of leading journalists and media managers in Ghana.

=== United Nations ===
He started a long period of service within the UN starting as project manager for the Tajikistan community-based peace and confidence building project under the United Nations Development Programme (UNDP), Tajikistan from July 1996 to May 1999. Between November 1999 to August 2002, he worked at the United Nations Volunteers Programme under the UNDP in Geneva, as a Programme Specialist for peace and confidence-building programmes.

He rose to become a Small Arms and Demobilisation Specialist and at some point the Acting team leader of the Small Arms and Demobilisation Unit within the Bureau for Crisis Prevention and Recovery (BCPR) under UNDP between September 2003 and February 2006.

Bani managed and coordinated Crisis Prevention and Recovery (CPR) programmes in support of over 20 countries and regional organisations in Africa, as the team leader for the BCPR based in South Africa, between 2009 and 2011. Prior to this, He served as a regional advisor in Dakar, Senegal for the BCPR under the UNDP from March 2006 to February 2009.

Between 2011 and 2012, Bani led the United Nations / Intergovernmental Authority on Development inter-ministerial response to the humanitarian crises in Horn of Africa as the Senior Recovery Advisor and Manager.

== Political career ==
=== Chief of staff ===
Bani is a member of the National Democratic Congress. He was appointed by President John Dramani Mahama on 8 January 2013 after he had been sworn in as president on 7 January to serve as Chief of Staff to take over from John Henry Martey Newman. He served in that capacity for 2 years until 15 February 2015 when he was removed from office and replaced with the then local government and rural development minister Julius Debrah. He was then assigned to as serve as Ambassador Extraordinaire and Plenipotentiary. His removal was met with a lot of displeasure from groups within the Volta Region of Ghana. After his removal of office as chief of staff, Bani still worked as part of government as he was performing sod cutting ceremonies along with other officials in the Volta region especially within the Kpando Municipality.

=== Minister of Interior ===
Bani was appointed as the Minister of Interior as part of a ministerial reshuffle by John Dramani Mahama on 19 January 2016. He took over from Mark Woyongo who had been moved to the presidency to serve as Minister of state. His appointment was received with great pleasure and excitement from people within his native town Kpando.

=== National Security Coordinator ===
On January 3, 2025, he was appointed as team lead for an interim national security team by president John Dramani Mahama. Subsequent to that, he was appointed as National Security Advisor to the president on January 15, 2025.

== Philanthropy work ==
Bani built and donated a Mother and Baby Unit to Margaret Marquart Catholic Hospital in Kpando in the Volta Region in October 2019. He built it based on reports of inadequate facilities to facilitate the delivery of children and to lack of equipment within the hospital. The unit is meant to drastically reduce the mortality rates of mothers and their babies within the Kpando municipal area.

In September 2018, Bani was appointed as the board chairman of the Dialysis Services Foundation, a non-profit charitable organization aimed at providing for the medical expenses of patients with kidney failures.

== Publications ==
• D.K. Bani and Julius Ihonvbere; "The State Non-governmental Organizations and Development in Africa," Foreign Affairs Reports vol. XLIII, No. 6, June 1994.

• Prosper D.K. Bani; Review of Ihonvbere, Julius O., Nigeria: The Politics of Adjustment and Democracy, New Brunswick, NJ and London, UK; transaction Publishers 1994. 231pp. In Journal of Third World Studies, vol. XI, No. 2, Fall 1994.
