= Kwadwo Agyei-Addo =

Ghanaian politician

MP for Fanteakwa North
- In office January 7, 2005 – January 6, 2009
- President: John Agyekum Kufour

Personal details
- Born: October 15, 1951 (age 74) Fanteakwa, Eastern Region Gold Coast (now Ghana)
- Party: New Patriotic Party
- Children: 5
- Education: Presbyterian Boys Secondary School; Accra Academy
- Occupation: Politician
- Profession: Accountant

Kwadwo Agyei-Addo (born October 15, 1951) is a Ghanaian politician and a member of the Fourth Parliament of the Fourth Republic representing the Fanteakwa North Constituency in the Eastern Region of Ghana.

== Early life and education ==
Kwadwo Agyei-Addo was born on October 15, 1951, in a town in the Eastern Region of Ghana called Fanteakwa. He attended the Presbyterian Boys Secondary School and then attended Accra Academy. From there, he obtained his sixth form education.

== Politics ==
Agyei-Addo was first elected into Parliament on the Ticket of the New Patriotic Party during the December 2004 Ghanaian General elections as a member of the Fanteakwa North Constituency. He obtained 20,867 votes out of the 36,851 valid votes cast representing 56.6%.

=== 2004 elections ===
Agyei-Addo was elected as the member of parliament for the Fanteakwah North constituency in the 4th parliament of the 4th republic of Ghana from January 7, 2005, to January 6, 2009. In the 2004 Ghanaian general elections, he was elected over Samuael Ofosu-Ampofo of the National Democratic Congress and Gyimah Aikins Nyantakyi of the Convention People's Party. These obtained 15,678votes and 306votes respectively of the total valid votes cast. These were equivalent to 42.5% and 0.8% respectively of the total valid votes cast. Addo's constituency was a part of the 22 constituencies won by the New Patriotic Party in the Eastern region in that elections. In all, the New Patriotic Party won a total 128 parliamentary seats in the 4th parliament of the 4th republic of Ghana.

== Career ==
Agyei-Addo is an Accountant and businessman.

== Personal life ==
Agyei-Addo is a Christian.
