= Akwasi Opong-Fosu =

Ghanaian politician

Hon. Akwasi Opong-Fosu
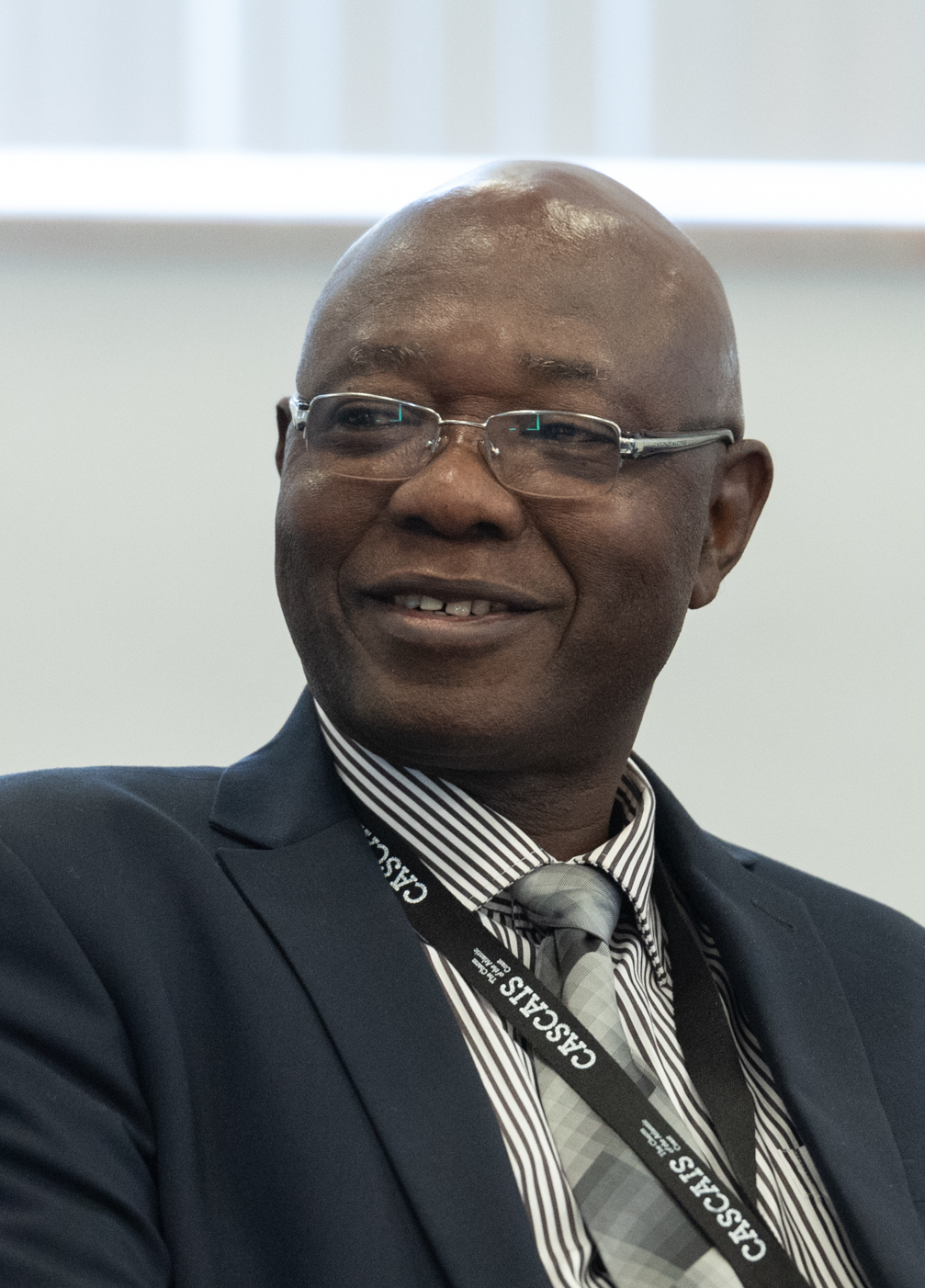

Member of the Ghana Parliament for Amenfi East
- In office 7 January 2013 – 6 January 2017
- Preceded by: Joseph Aidoo
- Succeeded by: Patrick Bogyako-Siaime
- Majority: 10,357

Minister for Local Government and Rural Development
- In office 2013 – May 2014
- President: John Dramani Mahama
- Preceded by: Samuel Ofosu-Ampofo
- Succeeded by: Julius Debrah

Personal details
- Born: 1 February 1958 (age 68)
- Party: National Democratic Congress
- Children: 3

Akwasi Opong-Fosu (born 1 February 1958) is a Ghanaian politician. He was the Member of Parliament for the Amenfi East constituency from 2013 to 2017. He is a member of the National Democratic Congress.

He was appointed Minister for Local Government and Rural Development by President John Dramani Mahama in March 2013, and succeeded by Julius Debrah in that title in May 2014.

== Personal life ==
Fosu is a Christian (Word Miracle Church International). He is married with three children.

== Early life and education ==
Fosu was born on February 1, 1958. He hails from Afransiei, a town in the Western Region of Ghana. He entered the University of London and obtained his master's degree in Public Policy and Management in 2002.

== Politics ==
Fosu is a member of the National Democratic Congress (NDC). In 2012, he contested for the Amenfi East seat on the ticket of the NDC sixth parliament of the fourth republic and won.

== Employment ==
Fosu is employed in local government service in Accra.

== See also ==
- List of Mahama government ministers
- Amenfi East

Parliament of Ghana
Preceded by Joseph Aidoo	Member of Parliament for Amenfi East; 2013 – present	Succeeded by Patrick Bogyako-Siaime
Political offices
Preceded by Samuel Ofosu-Ampofo	Minister for Local Government and Rural Development; 2013 – May 2014	Succeeded by Julius Debrah
