= Patrick Bogyako-Siaime =

Ghanaian politician

Member of the Ghana Parliament for Amenfi East Constituency

Personal details
- Born: September 24, 1964 (age 61)
- Party: New Patriotic Party

Patrick Bogyako-Siaime is a Ghanaian politician and member of the Seventh Parliament of the Fourth Republic of Ghana representing the Amenfi East Constituency in the Western Region on the ticket of the New Patriotic Party.

== Early life ==
On September 24, 1964, he was born.

== Education ==
He earned an MBA from KNUST, a Bachelor of Commerce from the University of Cape Coast, and a Post Graduate Diploma in purchasing and supply from the Chartered Institute of Purchasing and Supply.

== Career ==
From 1993 to 1998, Patrick Bogyako-Saime served as the regional marketing officer for the Electricity Company of Ghana. From 1998 to 2003, he served as the transport manager, from 2003 to 2006 as the internal audit manager for the Ghana Oil Palm Plantation, and in 2006, he worked for Golden Star Resources as a group internal auditor.

== Politics ==
Patrick Bogyako- Saime is a member of New Patriotic Party and represent the Amenfi East constituency in the Western Region in the Seventh parliament of the Fourth Republic of Ghana.

=== 2016 election ===
Hon Bogyako- Saime contested the Amenfi East constituency parliamentary seat on the ticket of New Patriotic Party during the 2016 Ghanaian general election and won with 26,851 votes representing 54.55% of the total votes. He won the parliamentary seat over Akwasi Opong Fosu of the National Democratic Congress who pulled 21,597 votes which is equivalent to 43.87%, parliamentary candidate for the Progressive People's Party Simon Peter Adabor had 635 votes representing 1.29% and the parliamentary candidate for the Convention People's Party Ofosuhene Vivian had 144 votes representing 0.29% of the total votes.
