= Sherry Ayittey =

Ghanaian politician (1948–2023)

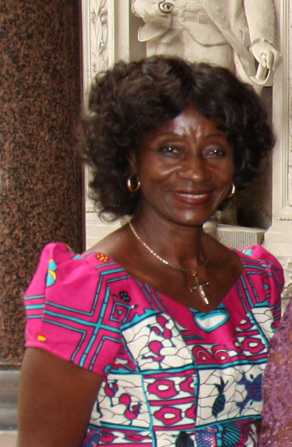
- Ayittey in 2014

Minister of Fisheries and Aquaculture Development
- In office 9 June 2014 – 6 January 2017
- President: John Mahama
- Preceded by: Nayon Bilijo
- Succeeded by: Elizabeth Afoley Quaye

Minister for Health
- In office February 2013 – 9 June 2014
- President: John Mahama
- Preceded by: Alban Bagbin
- Succeeded by: Kwaku Agyemang-Mensah

Minister for Environment, Science and Technology
- In office February 2009 – 6 January 2013
- President: John Atta Mills; John Mahama
- Succeeded by: Joe Oteng-Adjei

Personal details
- Born: Hanny Sherry Ayittey; 8 February 1948
- Died: 22 July 2023 (aged 75)
- Party: National Democratic Congress
- Children: 1
- Education: Kwame Nkrumah University of Science and Technology (BSc, MSc)
- Profession: Biochemist

Hanny-Sherry Naa Sakley Ayittey (8 February 1948 – 22 July 2023) was a Ghanaian biochemist, politician and women's activist. She was a Minister for Fisheries and Aquaculture Development. She was the Minister for Health from February 2013 to June 2014. She was the Minister for Environment, Science and Technology from 2009 to 2012.

== Early life and education ==
Ayittey was born on 8 February 1948. After graduating from Labone Secondary School in Accra as a member of the 1965–1967 year group, she attended the Kwame Nkrumah University of Science and Technology (KNUST), Kumasi, then the University of Science and Technology (UST), and earned a Bachelor of Science in Biochemistry and Master of Science in industrial microbiology. She was also a fellow of American universities of management, namely, Johns Hopkins University in Baltimore and Kellogg Graduate School of Management, Northwestern University. Ayittey was involved in non-governmental organisation activities in Ghana. In February 2013, she attended a leadership programme at Harvard University.

== Career ==
Ayittey served as the managing director of Ghana Industrial Holding Corporation (GIHOC) Distilleries. She served on several management boards in Ghana including the Ghana Water and Sewerage Corporation now Ghana Water Company Limited (GWCL), Social Security and National Insurance Trust (SSNIT), Ghana Forestry Commission, National Population Council and Ghana Export Promotion Council.

Ayittey was Ghana's lead of delegation to Conference of Parties (COP) of the United Nations Framework Convention on Climate Change, United Nations Convention to Combat Desertification and United Nations Convention on Biodiversity among others.

Ayitey was an attendant of the International Conference for Women in Beijing, China and the Africa Global Initiative Conference, Tokyo, Japan. She was also a fellow of the Institute of Directors, United Kingdom, and a member of the Chartered Institute of Marketing (CIM), Ghana.

== Politics ==
Ayittey was a founding member of the National Democratic Congress (NDC). She served in several roles within the party and in government, serving as a women's activist, a minister of state and a National Vice-chairperson.

=== Minister of Environment, Science and Technology ===
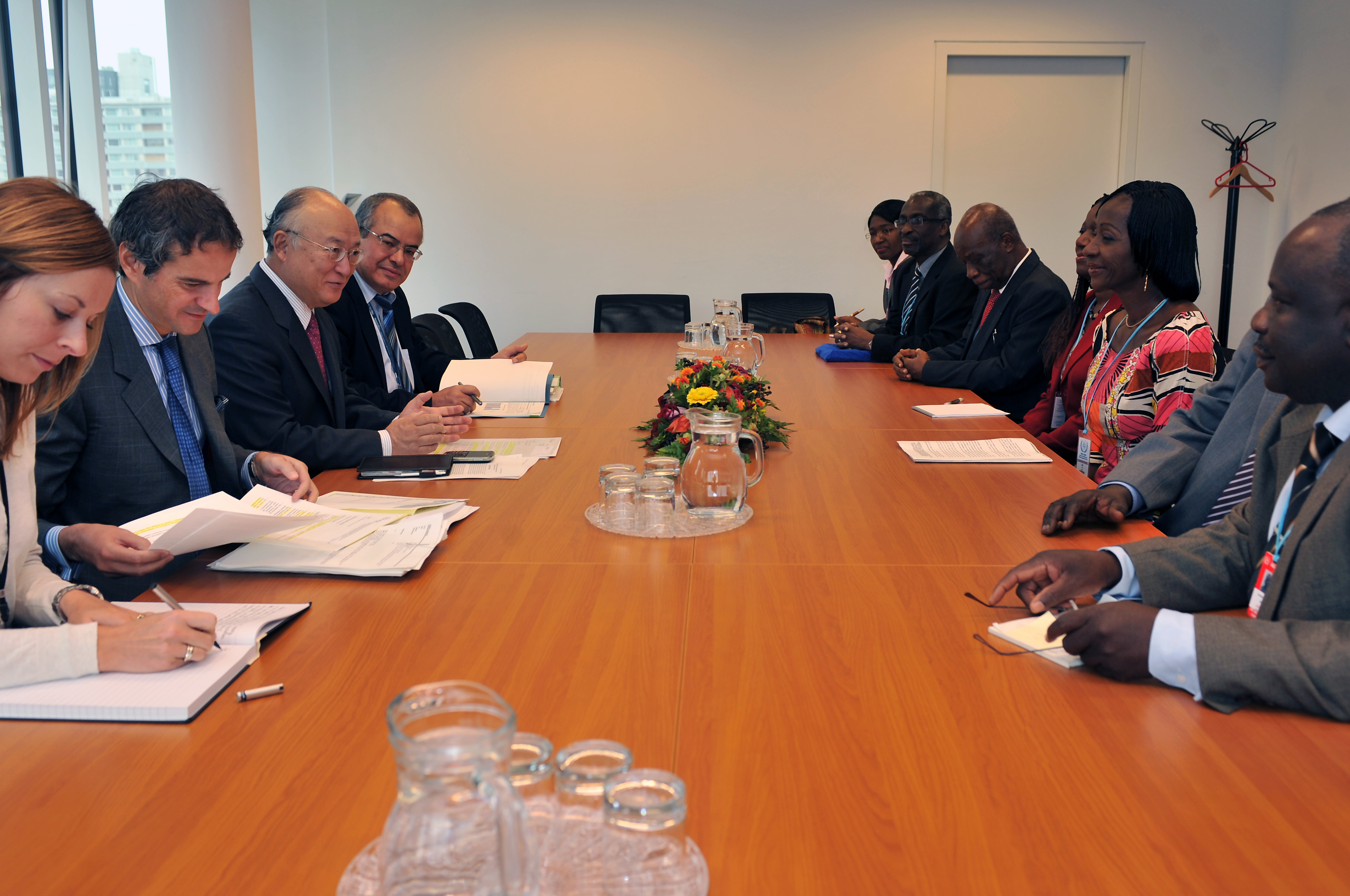
Bilateral meeting between Sherry Ayittey and IAEA Director General Yukiya Amano at the IAEA 55th General Conference in 2011

After the 2008 presidential election, President John Atta Mills appointed Ayittey as Minister for Environment, Science and Technology, making her a member of his 19-minister cabinet in January 2009. During her tenure she had to work along with the Ministry of Energy in ensuring Ghana's first drill of oil and gas. She led the ministry to ensure that all environmental hazards has been taken into consideration. She also led the ministry in drawing an oil and gas master plan along with the Environmental Protection Agency (EPA) to integrate environmental management, health and safety and community issues into petroleum sector operations to ensure sustainable development. She represented President Atta Mills at the 2nd Commission Meeting of COMSATS in April 2012, where the President was appointed the chairperson of the commission.

Ayittey served as the chairperson of the United Nations Commission on Science and Technology (Geneva) and the African Regional Centre on Technology (Dakar). She was also a member of ECOWAS Board, Economic Community of West African States Regional Centre for Renewable Energy and Energy Efficiency (ECREEE) and was also a Council Member of the Global Environment Facility (GEF), Washington.

=== Minister of Health ===
In January 2013, she was appointed Minister for Health by President John Mahama, taking over from Alban Bagbin. She represented Ghana at international forums and conferences during her tenure, including the 66th World Health Assembly, in which she was one of the keynote speakers at the assembly on climate change and air pollution.

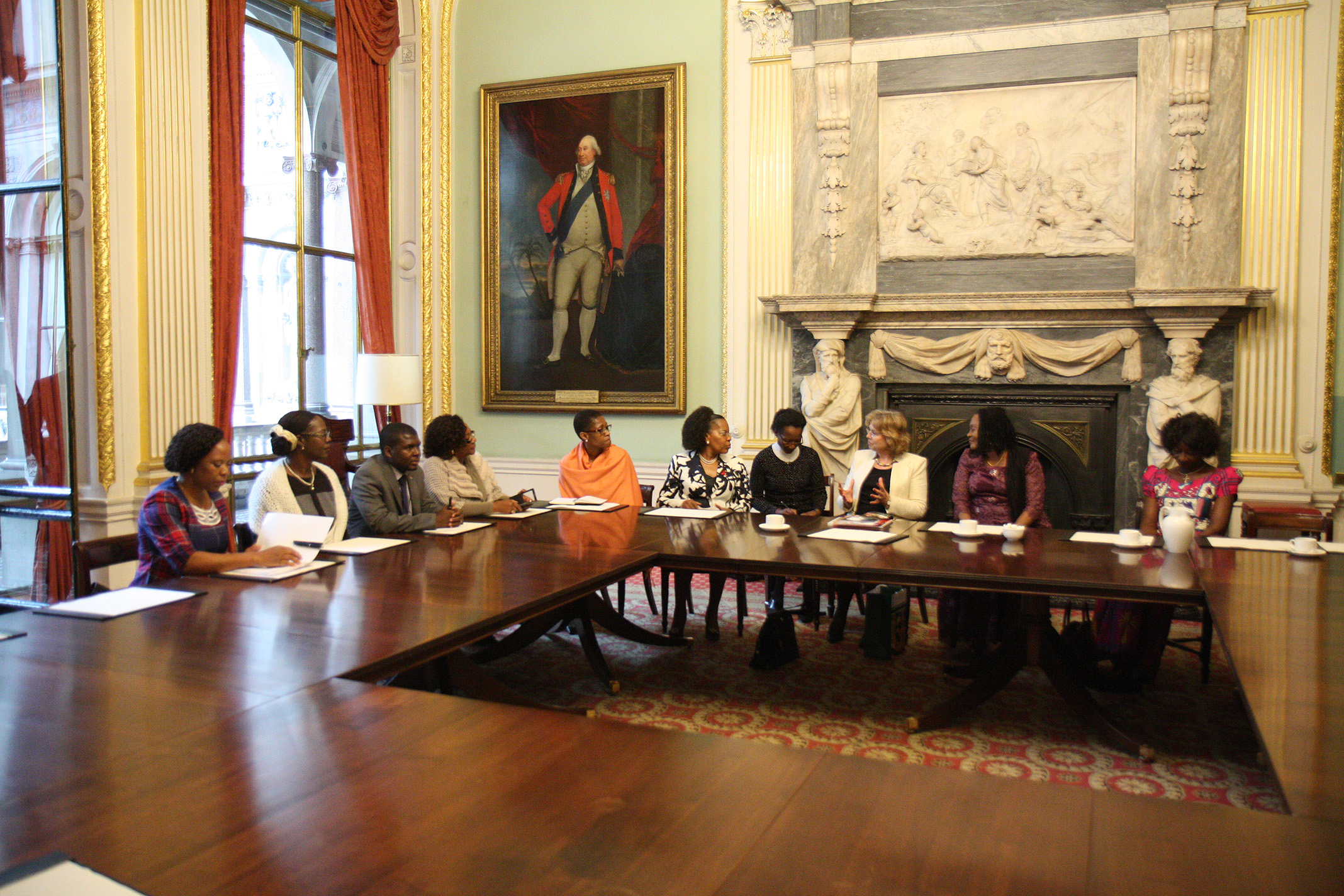
Ayittey with Lordina Mahama at GAVI Alliance HPV event meet up with the Baroness Northover in June 2014.

Whilst serving as Ghana's Health Minister, she made calls at the 2013 National Family planning week celebration in Ho, Volta Region, on the need for the Ghana Education Service (GES) to introduce the teaching of family planning in schools to enable the adolescents to understand and know more about their reproductive health. The youth's lack of knowledge on reproductive health and family planning was considered a major contributing factor to the high incidences of teenage pregnancy in Ghana, and it was hoped that the introduction of these topics in the curriculum would reduce the stigma associated with reproductive health. She also stated that traditional authorities and religious leaders should regularly bring in experts in family planning and reproductive health to sensitise their communities on these issues.

During her tenure as health minister, she also considered eye-care as a critical aspect of ensuring a healthy nation, which led to an initiative of the distribution of eye-glasses in collaboration with the Christian Health Association of Ghana (CHAG) to people living in rural communities in Ghana. In 2014, as the Minister of Health, she advocated for the training of more ophthalmologists in Ghana since there were only 74 trained ophthalmologists nationwide.

=== Minister of Fisheries and Aquaculture ===
On 9 June 2014, Ayitey was reassigned by President Mahama to the Ministry of Fisheries and Aquaculture.

=== NDC national vice-chairperson ===
In 2000, Ayittey was the national vice-chairman for the NDC. In 2018, Ayittey declared her intentions to stand for the national vice-chairmanship position for the NDC. She stood along with Awudu Sofo Asorka, Said Sinare, Yaw Owusu Obimpeh, Adu-Yeboah, Amadu Bukari Sorogho, Seth Ofosu-Ohene, Sumaila Mahama and Kwame Ampofo. She campaigned and declared that her decision to stand for the position was on the agenda to "Rebuild, Reposition and Regain the party values and principles among its grassroots base towards the 2020 Ghana elections." She succeeded in her bid to become a member of the party's national executive committee after the elections on 18 November 2018, she was voted to serve as one of the three vice chairpersons for the party, with Awudu Sofo Asorka serving as 1st Vice, her serving as 2nd Vice and Said Sinare as 3rd Vice.

== 31 December Women's Movement ==
Ayittey was involved with 31 December Women's Movement, a non governmental organisation affiliated to the NDC, whose president is Nana Konadu Agyeman Rawlings, wife of the late Jerry Rawlings, former President of Ghana. She also served as the treasurer and project and budget coordinator of the organisation.

== Ghana Rubber Estates Limited (GREL) trial ==
After the NDC lost the Ghanaian presidential election in December 2000, the New Patriotic Party came to power with John Kufuor forming his government. Various NDC activists stood trial for different reasons. Ayitey was put on trial with Nana Konadu Agyeman Rawlings in relation to the divestiture of the Ghana Rubber Estates Limited. Ayitey had been a member of the Divestiture Implementation Committee. She challenged the High Court's decision for her to open her defence. However, the Court of Appeal turned down her request and asked that she opened her defence in the High Court.

Giving evidence at the court under cross-examination, Emmanuel Amuzu Agbodo, former Executive Secretary of the Divestiture Implementation Committee (DIC), and one of the three accused persons said during his tenure of office, Ayitey, treasurer of 31 December Women's Movement did not approach him to seek any favours on behalf of SIPH. She denied all allegations against her in the GREL trial. At the end of the trial on 21 April 2005, the Court ruled that the Prosecution had failed to prove its case beyond all reasonable doubts against Ayittey and Agbodo, and, therefore, freed them.

== Personal life ==
Ayittey's elder brother was the libertarian free market economist George Ayittey. Ayittey died on 22 July 2023, at age 75. Several politicians and members of the general public paid tribute to her on social media and traditional media. Former President John Mahama described her death as a shocking loss, while her party, the National Democratic Congress, described it as a sudden and unexpected blow. They went on to describe her as a party stalwart whose contributions to nation building span a generation in Ghana's history.

== Honours and recognition ==
In 1990, Ayittey was adjudged the Chartered Institute of Marketing Ghana (CIM) Marketing Woman of the Year.

== See also ==
- List of Mills government ministers
- National Democratic Congress

Political offices
Preceded by Dominic Fobih (Minister for Education, Science and Sports)	Minister for Environment, Science and Technology; 2009–2013	Succeeded by Joe Oteng-Adjei
Preceded by Kwadwo Adjei-Darko (Minister for Local Government, Rural Development and Environment)	Minister for Environment, Science and Technology; 2009–2013	Succeeded by Joe Oteng-Adjei
Preceded by Alban Bagbin	Minister for Health; 2013–2014	Succeeded by Kwaku Agyemang-Mensah
Preceded by Nayon Bilijo	Minister of Fisheries & Aquaculture Development; 2014–2017	Succeeded by Elizabeth Afoley Quaye
