= Mark Woyongo =

Ghanaian politician (1946–2024)

Hon. Mark Owen Woyongo

Member of the Ghana Parliament for Navrongo Central
- In office 7 January 2013 – 2017
- Preceded by: Joseph Kofi Adda
- Majority: 2,464

Upper East Region Minister
- In office 2009–2014
- President: John Atta Mills
- Preceded by: Alhassan Samari
- Succeeded by: Ephraim Avea Nsoh

Minister for Defence
- In office 2013–2014
- President: John Dramani Mahama
- Preceded by: Joseph Henry Smith
- Succeeded by: Benjamin Kunbuor

Minister for the Interior
- In office 16 July 2014 – 7 January 2017
- President: John Dramani Mahama
- Preceded by: Kwesi Ahwoi
- Succeeded by: Ambrose Dery

Personal details
- Born: 9 June 1946 Bolgatanga, Northern Territories
- Died: 17 January 2024 (aged 77) Accra, Ghana
- Party: National Democratic Congress

Mark Owen Woyongo (9 June 1946 – 17 January 2024) was a Ghanaian politician who served as the Ghanaian Minister for the Interior for the Ghanaian Ministry of the Interior. He was also the Member of Parliament for the Navrongo Central constituency in Ghana.

Woyongo first stood for election on the ticket of the National Democratic Congress in the 2008 Ghanaian parliamentary election, winning 41.7% of the votes and losing to Joseph Kofi Adda of the New Patriotic Party by 1,130 votes (3.5%). He was however appointed the Upper East Regional Minister by President Mills in his government in 2009. He was retained in this position by President Mahama following the death of Mills. In 2013, he was nominated by President Mahama for the position of Minister for Defence.

== Early life and education ==
Woyongo was born on 9 June 1946 in Bolgatanga in the Upper East Region of Ghana. He attended Notre Dame Secondary School in Navrongo in 1966. He completed a Diploma in Journalism from Ghana Institute of Journalism in 1971. He undertook professional courses in Ghana and abroad.

== Political career ==
Mark Owen Woyongo was the Public Relations Officer for the Upper East Regional Administration from 1978 and 1985. He was appointed the Regional Information Officer, Upper East Region in 1985. In 1994, he was appointed the Minister Counselor for Information at the Ghana High Commission in London, United Kingdom. Mark Woyongo was the Minister for the Upper East Region from 2009 to 2012. He survived a fatal accident when returning from the NDC congress held in the Upper East region.

Woyongo won the 2012 parliamentary elections on the ticket of the National Democratic Congress (NDC). In 2013, he was appointed Defence Minister and subsequently to the Ministry of the Interior during his tenure as Upper East Regional Minister.

== Personal life and death ==
Mark Woyongo was married and had two children. He died on 17 January 2024, at the age of 77.

== See also ==
- List of Mills government ministers
- List of Mahama government ministers

Parliament of Ghana
Preceded by Joseph Kofi Adda	Navrongo Central; 2013–2017	Succeeded by
Political offices
Preceded by Alhassan Samari	Ministry for Upper East Region; 2009–2014	Succeeded by Ephraim Avea Nsoh
Preceded by Kwesi Ahwoi	Minister for the Interior; 2014–2017	Succeeded by Ambrose Dery
Military offices
Preceded by Joseph Henry Smith	Minister for Defence; 2013–2014	Succeeded by Benjamin Kunbuor
