= Samuel Ofosu-Ampofo =

Government Minister in Ghana

Minister for Local Government and Rural Development
- In office 2011–2013
- President: John Atta Mills
- Preceded by: Joseph Yieleh Chireh

Eastern Regional Minister
- In office 2009–2011
- President: John Atta Mills
- Preceded by: Kwadwo Afram Asiedu
- Succeeded by: Dr Kwasi Appiah-Kubi

Member of Parliament for Fanteakwa North
- In office 1996–2004
- Succeeded by: Kwadjo Agyei Addo

Personal details
- Born: 10 March 1962 (age 64)
- Party: National Democratic Congress
- Spouse: Joyce Ofosu-Ampofo
- Children: Obed Ofosu-Ampofo, Steve Ofosu-Ampofo, Aaron Ofosu-Ampofo, Samuel Ofosu-Ampofo, Ebenezer Ofosu-Ampofo, Vivian Ofosu-Ampofo
- Education: Ghana Institute of Management & Public Administration (GIMPA)
- Occupation: Mechanical Engineer

Samuel Ofosu-Ampofo (born March 10, 1962) is a Ghanaian politician and a former Member of Parliament and former District Chief Executive for the Fanteakwa North district of the Eastern Region of Ghana. He is also a former Eastern Regional Minister and a former National Organizer of the National Democratic Congress. Ampofo is also a former Minister for Local Government and Rural Development. He is the former national Chairman for the National Democratic Congress(NDC).

== Early life and education ==
Ofosu-Ampofo was born in Kyebi in the Eastern Region of Ghana. He attained his basic school education at the Asamankese, Anum L/A Middle School (1976 – 1979). He proceeded to the Akwatia Technical Institute for secondary education from 1979 to 1982. He moved on to Kumasi Polytechnic in 1987 and went further to pursue a Post Graduate Certificate in Public Administration at the Ghana Institute of Management & Public Administration (GIMPA) and at Haggai Institute in Hawaii Islands.

He also attended University of Education, Winneba(Kumasi Campus) to pursue a sandwich program from 1991 – 1993. Ampofo also attended University of Mines and Technology(UMAT) in Tarkwa and obtained a degree in mechanical engineering from 1983 -1985. He is also an alumnus of the USA-Specialized Studies in Advanced Leadership (1998).

== Politics ==
Ampofo is a member of the 2nd and 3rd Parliament of the fourth republic of Ghana and a politician of the National Democratic Congress. His political career started when he was appointed District Chief Executive by His excellency former president Jerry John Rawlings from 1994 to 1996.

=== Member of Parliament ===
He then participated in the 1996 Ghanaian general elections as a parliamentary candidate for the Fanteakwa North constituency of the Eastern region of Ghana. He won this seat with a total of 21,284 of the total valid votes cast that year. He retained his seat in the 2000 Ghanaian general elections with a total of 15,487 making 49.70% of the total valid votes cast.

He contested again in the 2004 elections and lost to Kwadjo Agyei Addo of the New Patriotic Party. He went ahead to contest again in the 2008 Ghanaian general elections and lost again to Kwabena Amankwa Asiamah of the New Patriotic party.

=== Minister of State ===
He stood for the party National Organizer position, and was appointed Ghana Minister for Local Government and Rural Development by President Mills during a cabinet reshuffle in January 2011. Prior to this appointment he had been the Eastern Regional Minister since the start of the Mills NDC government in 2009 and was succeeded by Kwasi Akyem Apea-Kubi.

He was later appointed board chairman of Ghana ports and Harbour Authority in 2013 under the regime of former president John Dramani Mahama. In November 2018, Ampofo was elected the National Chairman of the NDC at 9th delegate congress held at Fantasy Dome at the Trade Fair Centre in Accra. His contenders were Dan Abodakpi, Betty Mould Iddrisu, Alhaji Huudu Yahaya and Danny Annang.

== Legal issues & controversies ==
=== Kidnapping Allegations ===
On June 11, 2019, Samuel Ofosu-Ampofo was arrested by the Criminal Investigations Department (CID) of Ghana. Ofosu-Ampofo was arrested in connection to a series of kidnappings that had occurred throughout the nation; consisting of a foreign diplomat, a foreign national, and volunteers from Canada.

=== Criminal Conspiracy Allegations ===
November 2020, the High Court of Ghana admitted into evidence alleged recordings of Ofosu-Ampofo committing criminal conspiracy. The origin of the recording was February 2019. An alleged audio recording of the voice of NDC National Chairman Samuel Ofosu Ampofo and another individual planning a road-map of criminal activities targeted at some individuals has been admitted as evidence. The targeted individuals include the Electoral Commission (EC) chair and the Chairman of the National Peace Council among others

This was after the court had rejected claims by lawyers for the politician that the audio breached constitutionally guaranteed right to privacy. The two have pleaded not guilty to conspiracy to commit assault against a public officer, while Mr Ofosu-Ampofo has separately pleaded not guilty to two counts of assault against a public officer.

Political offices
Preceded by Kwadwo Afram Asiedu	Eastern Regional Minister; 2009 — 2011	Succeeded by Dr Kwasi Apea-Kubi
Preceded by Joseph Yieleh Chireh	Minister for Local Government and Rural Development; 2011 — 2013	Succeeded by Akwasi Oppong Fosu
