= Limuna Mohammed Muniru =

Ghanaian politician (1967–2025)

Hon. Limuna Mohammed Muniru
- President: John Dramani Mahama

Personal details
- Born: 8 August 1967 Ghana
- Died: 6 August 2025 (aged 57) Ashanti Region, Ghana
- Party: NDC
- Occupation: Politician

Limuna Mohammed Muniru (8 August 1967 – 6 August 2025) was a Ghanaian politician who served as the Northern Regional Minister of Ghana. Prior to heading the Northern region, he was Upper East Regional Minister and a Minister of State at the Presidency. At the time of his death he was serving as the acting deputy national security coordinator.

== Early life and education ==
Limuna Mohammed Muniru was born on 8 August 1967 in Langbonto, Damongo, in the Savannah Region. He started his primary school at United Primary School in Tamale, had his Junior High School (JHS) education at the Vitting Experimental JHS from 1977 to 1980 in Tamale, proceeded to Damongo Secondary School in the Savannah Region, for his GCE Ordinary Level from 1980 to 1984, and then Tamale Secondary School in Tamale from 1986 to 1988 for his GCE Advanced Level. Limuna obtained a Bachelor of Arts degree from the University of Ghana between 1990 and 1993. He attended the London School of Hygiene & Tropical Medicine in 2007–2008. He graduated from the Ghana Institute of Management and Public Administration (GIMPA) in April 2005.

== Personal life and death ==
Muniru was married and had four children. He died on 6 August 2025, when the military helicopter he was travelling on crashed in the Ashanti Region, killing all eight people on board, including the Minister of Defence, Edward Omane Boamah, the Minister of Environment, Ibrahim Murtala Muhammed, and the vice chairman of the NDC, Samuel Sarpong. He and other victims of the crash were accorded a state funeral in Accra on 15 August that was attended by President John Mahama.
