= Alex Segbefia =

Ghanaian lawyer and politician

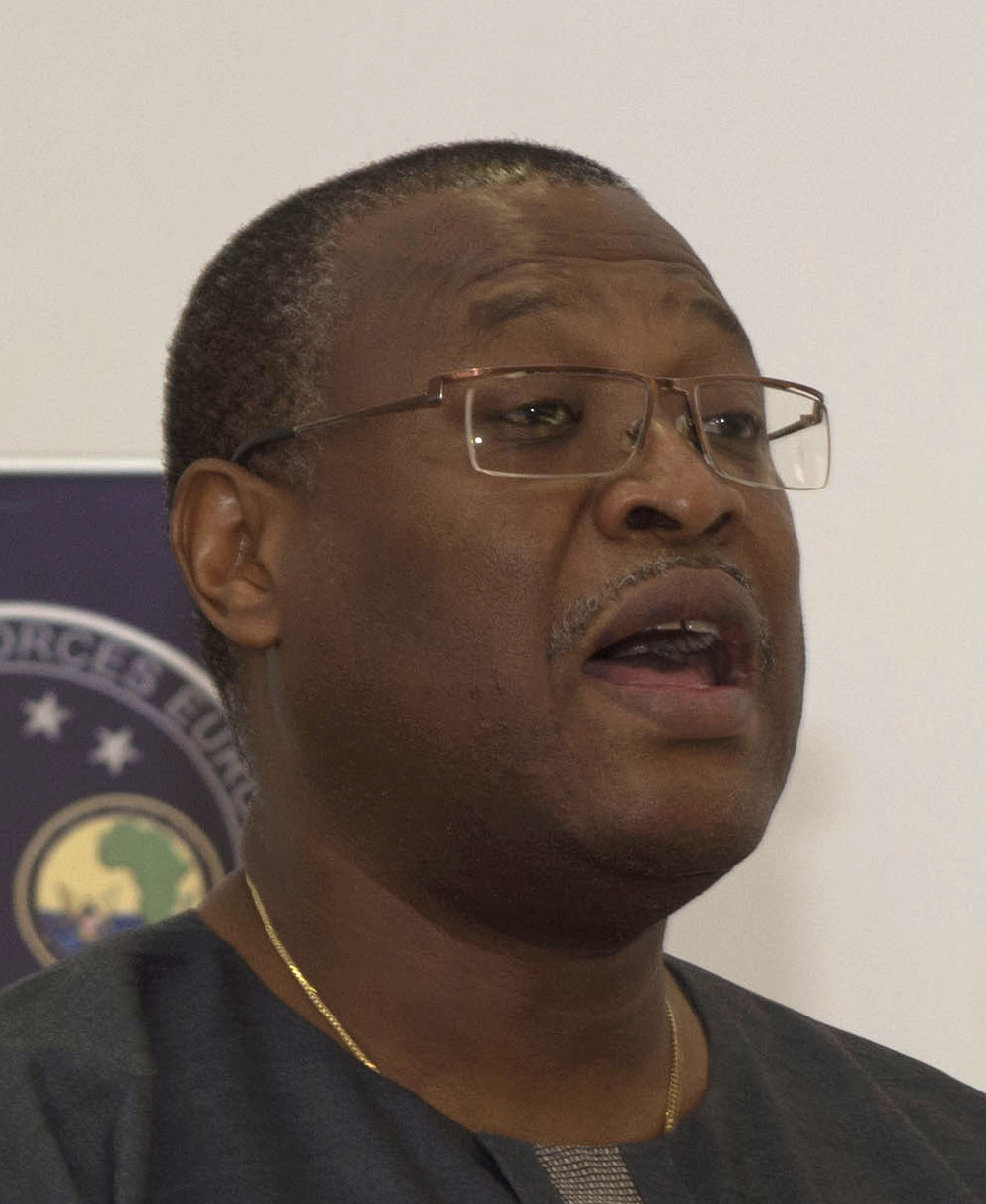

Minister for Health
- In office May 2015 – January 2017
- President: John Dramani Mahama
- Preceded by: Kwaku Agyemang Manu

Deputy Minister of Defence
- In office 2014–2015
- President: John Dramani Mahama

Deputy Chief of Staff
- In office 2009–2013
- President: John Atta Mills

Personal details
- Party: National Democratic Congress
- Profession: Lawyer

Alexander Percival Segbefia (born c. 1963) is a Ghanaian lawyer and politician. He was the Deputy Chief of Staff during Mills government. He was appointed the Minister of Health under the John Dramani Mahama administration.

== Career ==
Alex Segbefia had his secondary school education at Achimota School. He qualified as a lawyer in the UK and practised law in the UK in various capacities such as Crown Prosecutor, and then eventually becoming the Acting District Crown Prosecutor at the Crown Prosecution Service (CPS).
