= Paul Evans Aidoo =

Ghanaian teacher and politician

Hon. Paul Evans Aidoo

Member of the Ghana Parliament for Sefwi-Wiawso
- Incumbent
- Assumed office Jan 2005
- Preceded by: Isaac Kobina Nyame-Ofori

Western Region Minister
- In office Jan 2009 – Mar 2013
- President: John Atta Mills
- Preceded by: Evans A. Amoah
- Succeeded by: Ebenezer Kwadwo Teye Addo

Brong-Ahafo Region Minister
- In office Mar 2013 – Mar 2014
- President: John Dramani Mahama
- Preceded by: Twumasi Marfo
- Succeeded by: Kofi-Eric Opoku Manu

Western Region Minister
- Incumbent
- Assumed office Mar 2014
- President: John Dramani Mahama
- Preceded by: Ebenezer Kwadwo Teye Addo

Personal details
- Born: 4 August 1958 (age 68) Sefwi-Ewiase, Ghana
- Party: National Democratic Congress
- Children: 8
- Education: Enchi Teacher Training College
- Occupation: Teacher
- Committees: Subsidiary Legislation Committee; Local Government and Rural Development

Paul Evans Aidoo (born 4 August 1958) is a Ghanaian teacher and politician. He is the Member of Parliament for Sefwi-Wiawso and is the Minister for the Western Region of Ghana. Prior to heading the Western Region, he was the Brong-Ahafo Regional Minister. He has been condemned for "promoting hatred" by Ghana's Centre for Popular Education and Human Rights after the minister urged people to report suspected homosexuals. "All efforts are being made to get rid of these people in the society," he said.

== Early life and education ==
Paul Aidoo was born on 4 August 1958 at Sefwi-Ewiase in the Sefwi-Wiawso District of the Western Region of Ghana. He studied privately for the General Certificate of Education Ordinary Level in 1980. He attended the Enchi Teacher Training College between 1977 and 1981, qualifying with Teachers’ Certificate’A’.

== Career ==
Aidoo worked as a teacher between 1981 and 1985. He then worked with the National Mobilization Programme as a District Liaison Officer between 1985 and 1997. Between 1997 and 2001, he was a District Chief Executive with the Ministry of Local Government. From 2002 to 2004, he was a headmaster with the Ghana Education Service.

== Politics ==
Aidoo is a member of the National Democratic Congress and won the Sefwi-Wiawso seat in the Ghanaian parliamentary election in 2004. He retained his seat in the 2008 election. In 2009, he was appointed Western Regional Minister by the President of Ghana, John Atta Mills and in March 2013, he was appointed Brong-Ahafo Regional Minister then re-appointed as Western Regional Minister in March 2014 by the President of Ghana, John Dramani Mahama. In July 2011, he called for Ghana's Bureau of National Investigations to arrest all homosexuals in the Western Region and asked landlords and tenants to report suspected homosexuals. He was reported as saying, "Once they have been arrested, they will be brought before the law". (A provision in the criminal code section of Ghana's 1992 constitution condemns "unnatural carnal knowledge". The constitution guarantees human rights "regardless of race, place of origin, political opinion, colour, religion, creed or gender", but not sexuality).

== Personal life ==
Aidoo is married with eight children. He is a Catholic.

== See also ==
- List of Mills government ministers
- National Democratic Congress (Ghana)
- Sefwi-Wiawso

Parliament of Ghana
Preceded by Isaac Kobina Nyame-Ofori	Member of Parliament for Sefwi-Wiawso; 2005 – present	Incumbent
Political offices
Preceded by Evans A. Amoah	Western Regional Minister; 2009 – 2013	Succeeded by Ebenezer Kwadwo Teye Addo
Preceded by Twumasi Marfo	Brong-Ahafo Regional Minister; 2013 – 2014	Succeeded by Kofi-Eric Opoku Manu
Preceded by Ebenezer Kwadwo Teye Addo	Western Regional Minister; 2014 – present	Incumbent
