= Kwaku Agyemang-Mensah =

Ghanaian politician

Kwaku Agyemang-Mensah is a Ghanaian politician who is a member of National Democratic Congress. He was the Minister of Health in the John Mahama Administration.

== Politics ==
Agyemang-Mensah was appointed by President John Mahama to serve as the Minister of Health in June 2014 to replace Sherry Ayittey who had been appointed as Minister of Fisheries and Aquaculture after a ministerial reshuffle.
