= Joseph Henry Smith =

Ghanaian politician and military officer (1945–2023)

Lt Gen Joseph Henry Smith
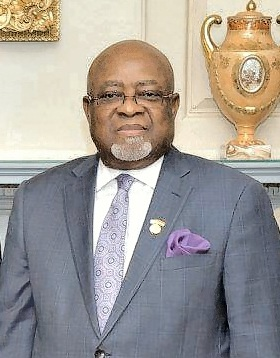

Ghana Ambassador to the United States of America
- In office 16 October 2014 – 2017
- President: John Dramani Mahama
- Preceded by: Daniel Ohene Agyekum
- Succeeded by: Baffour Adjei Bawuah

Minister for Defence
- In office February 2009 – February 2013
- President: John Atta Mills
- Preceded by: Albert Kan Dapaah
- Succeeded by: Mark Owen Woyongo

Personal details
- Born: 9 January 1945 Takoradi, Gold Coast (now Ghana)
- Died: 19 December 2023 (aged 78)
- Party: National Democratic Congress
- Children: 5
- Education: Achimota School
- Profession: Soldier
- Awards: Companion of the Order of the Volta

Military service
- Allegiance: Ghana
- Branch/service: Ghana Army
- Years of service: 1965–2001
- Rank: Lieutenant General
- Commands: Chief of Army Staff

Lieutenant General Joseph Henry Smith (9 January 1945 – 19 December 2023) was the Ambassador of Ghana to the United States from 2014 to 2017. Smith was the Minister for Defence of Ghana during President John Atta Mills' term of office from 2009 to 2013. He was also Chief of Army Staff of the Ghana Army from 1996 to 2001.

== Early life and education ==
Joseph Smith was born on 9 January 1945 in Takoradi, studied at the Achimota School in the Greater Accra Region of Ghana between 1959 and 1963 where he completed the West African School Certificate. He enrolled as an officer cadet at the Ghana Military Academy. He was commissioned 2/Lt on 16 October 1965 into the Ghana Army Engineer Corps.

== Military career ==
Smith was commissioned as a Second Lieutenant in October 1965 with the Ghana Army Engineer Corps. He rose through the years and became the Commandant of the Military Academy and Training School at Teshie, Accra in 1993. From 1993 to 1996, he was the Commander of the Second Infantry Brigade Group (now known as the Northern Command) with headquarters at Kumasi in the Ashanti Region of Ghana. While in this position, he was appointed Special Task Force Commander to restore law and order in Northern Ghana between January and September 1994 during the Konkomba and Nanumba conflict. In 1996, Smith served as the Company Commander of the United Nations Emergency Force (UNEF) in Egypt. He was appointed Chief of Staff of the Ghana Army in 1996 by President Jerry Rawlings. He held this position till 2001. Smith is the only Army Commander to have commanded three formations including two Infantry Brigade Groups. He retired from the military in February 2009 after 39 years.

== Other work ==
After leaving the army, Smith worked as the chairman of the Board of Directors of the National Insurance Commission before going into politics in 2009.

== Politics ==
In February 2009, Smith was appointed Minister for Defence by President John Atta Mills, a position he held till 2012, when President John Dramani Mahama replaced him with Mark Owen Woyongo.

On 16 October 2014, Smith was named, on 18 November 2014 was accredited the Ghanaian ambassador to the United States.

== Personal life ==
Smith was twice married. He had three children from his first marriage and two from his second marriage with Douha Smith. He had a cousin, Emmanuel Victor Smith who used to be spokesperson for former President Jerry Rawlings and also was one time Ghana Ambassador the United Kingdom. He was a Muslim.

== Death and burial ==
Joseph Henry Smith died on 19 December 2023, at the age of 78. His burial service took place on 23 December 2023 at the Al-Azziz Mosque in Burma Camp in Accra.

== Honours ==
- Smith was awarded the Companion of the Order of the Volta, one of Ghana's highest awards in 2001.
- Legion of Merit (USA) the fifth highest Award in the US Army.
- National Award – Ghana/UN Peace Keeping.
- The State of Texas, USA, honored with the title Admiral in the Texas Navy.
- International Award – UN Peace Keeping Operations in the Sinai, Egypt.

== External source ==
- Lt Gen Smith on official Ghana government website

Military offices
Preceded by Major General Ben Akafia	Chief of Army Staff; Ghana; 1996–2001	Succeeded by Major General Clayton Yaachie
Political offices
Preceded by Albert Kan-Dapaah	Minister for Defence; 2009–2013	Succeeded by Mark Woyongo
