= William Kwasi Aboah =

Ghanaian barrister and politician

Hon William Kwasi Aboah

33rd Minister for the Interior (Ghana)
- In office 2012 – January 2013
- President: John Atta Mills
- Preceded by: Benjamin Kunbuor
- Succeeded by: Kwesi Ahwoi

Minister for Police

Personal details
- Born: 4 June 1939 Ghana
- Died: August 2017 (aged 78) Ghana
- Party: National Democratic Congress
- Education: University of Ghana
- Profession: Barrister, Police officer
- Former Director of Ghana Immigration Service

William Kwasi Aboah (4 June 1939 – August 2017) was a Ghanaian barrister and politician. He was the minister for the police and the former minister for interior of Ghana.

== Early life and education ==
Aboah was born on 4 June 1939. He attended the Larteh Presby Boarding School between 1951 and 1954. He attended the Police Training Depot, passing out as a constable. While working, he took other courses at the Accra Workers College between 1965 and 1970. He attended the Police College in 1977, qualifying as an Assistant Superintendent of Police. He studied law at the University of Ghana between 1978 and 1981, graduating with the LL.B. degree. He continued to the Ghana School of Law, qualifying as a Barrister-at-Law. He studied for the master's degree in law at the University College London.

== Career ==
Aboah began his career as a police constable. He later worked as a detective inspector. He rose to the rank of inspector in the Police, working at the Criminal Investigation Department (CID). He held various posts within the Ghana Police, becoming commander of the Ashanti Region Police. He was seconded to the Ghana immigration service where he served as the director. He became head of the CID in August 1999.

Aboah was appointed by President John Atta Mills as the minister for interior following a cabinet reshuffle in January 2012 and was succeeded by Kwesi Ahwoi in February 2013.

== Honour ==
He was awarded the Sword of Honour presented by the Head of State for being all rounds Best Cadet Officer in 1977.

Political offices
Preceded by Benjamin Kunbuor	Minister for Interior; 2012 – 2013	Succeeded by Kwesi Ahwoi
