= Nayon Bilijo =

Ghanaian politician

Minister for Fisheries and Aquaculture Development
- In office 14 Feb 2013 – Dec 2016
- President: John Dramani Mahama
- Preceded by: new

Member of Parliament for Saboba
- In office 7 January 2001 – 6 January 2005
- Preceded by: Moses Mabengba Bukari
- Succeeded by: Charles Binipom Bintin
- Constituency: Saboba
- Majority: 4,716

Personal details
- Party: National Democratic Congress
- Education: Kwame Nkrumah University of Science and Technology
- Profession: Agric Economist and politician

Nayon Bilijo is a Ghanaian politician and a former Member of Parliament for the Saboba constituency of the Northern Region of Ghana. He is also an agriculturalist, forestry consultant and politician as well as a former Minister for Fisheries and Aquaculture Development.

== Education ==
After attending Ghana Senior High School in Tamale, Nayon Bilijo studied Agricultural Economics at the Kwame Nkrumah University of Science and Technology at Kumasi in Ghana where he graduated with a B. Sc. degree in 1979.

== Work ==
Bilijo worked with the Agricultural Development Bank of Ghana for ten years. In 1990, he joined the Internal Revenue Service and worked at the Office of Revenue Commissioners. He also worked for the Clark Sustainable Resource Developments Limited as the Director, Strategic Relationships where he was involved with underwater logging of the Volta Lake. Bilijo has also worked in other capacities with the Upper Region Agricultural Development Programme (URADEP) of the Ministry of Agriculture and the Upper West Commerce Association at Wa.

He was also the former Minister of Fisheries and Aquaculture Development.

== Politics ==
Bilijo is a member of the National Democratic Congress. He was appointed Deputy Minister for Lands and Forestry by President Rawlings in his government in 1996. He later became Member of Parliament for Saboba after winning the seat with a majority of 4,716 in the December 2000 elections. He served on the Foreign Affairs as well as the Lands and Forestry committees. He was appointed by President Mahama in his first government after winning the Ghanaian general election.

Bilijo was elected as the member of parliament for the Saboba constituency in the 2000 Ghanaian general elections. He was elected on the ticket of the National Democratic Congress. His constituency was one of the 16 parliamentary seats out of 21 seats won by the National Democratic Congress in that election for the Northern Region. The National Democratic Congress won a minority total of 92 parliamentary seats out of 200 seats in the 3rd parliament of the 4th republic of Ghana. He was elected with 7,938 votes out of the total valid votes cast. This was equivalent to 51.90% of the total valid votes cast. He was elected over Yaw Waja Peter a candidate of the Convention Peoples Party, Bintin B. Charles of the New Patriotic Party, Joshua B.Gewen of the National Reform Party, Gabriel Y. Mabe of the Peoples National Convention Party. These obtained 3,222, 3,022, 817 and 309 votes respectively out of the total valid votes cast. These were equivalent to 21.00%, 19.70%, 5.30% and 2.00% respectively of total valid votes cast.

== See also ==
- List of Mahama government ministers

Parliament of Ghana
Preceded by Moses Mabengba Bukari	Member of Parliament for Saboba; 2001 – 2005	Succeeded by Charles Binipom Bintin
Political offices
Preceded by ?	Deputy Minister for Lands and Forestry; 1996 – 2000	Succeeded by ?
New title	Minister for Minister for Fisheries and Aquaculture Development; 2013 – 2016	Succeeded by ?
