= Alexander Asum-Ahensah =

Ghanaian politician

Hon. Alexander Asum-Ahensah

Member of Parliament for Jaman North Constituency
- In office 7 January 2009 – 6 January 2013
- President: John Atta Mills; John Mahama
- Succeeded by: Siaka Stevens

Member of Parliament for Jaman North Constituency
- In office 7 January 2005 – 6 January 2009
- President: John Kufuor
- Preceded by: New constituency

Personal details
- Born: 23 July 1953 (age 73)
- Party: National Democratic Congress
- Children: 6
- Education: University of Cape Coast
- Profession: Educationist
- Cabinet: Minister for Chieftaincy and Culture

Alexander Asum-Ahensah (born 23 July 1953) is a Ghanaian politician and educationist. He is a former Member of Parliament for the Jaman North in the Brong Ahafo Region of Ghana.

== Early life and education ==
Asum-Ahensah was born on 23 July 1953. His hometown is Goka in the Brong Ahafo region of Ghana. In 1989, he obtained a Diploma in Education from the Accra Technical Training Centre. In 1997 he graduated with a Bachelor of Education from the University of Cape Coast. He obtained an Executive Masters from the Ghana Institute of Management and Public Administration.

== Career ==
Asum-Ahensah is an educationist. He has worked with the Ghana Education Service as the assistant director in charge of Supervision for the Jaman North District. After he entered politics, he was appointed as the Minister for Chieftaincy and Culture in the National Democratic Congress government led by President John Atta Mills.

== Politics ==
Asum Ahensah was elected as the member of parliament for the first time in the 2004 Ghanaian General elections. He was elected to represent the Jaman North constituency after it was newly formed in the 4th parliament of the 4th republic of Ghana. He was elected on the ticket of the National Democratic Congress. His constituency was a part of the 10 parliamentary seats out of 24 seats won by the National Democratic Congress in that election for the Brong Ahafo region. The National Democratic Congress won a minority total of 94 parliamentary seats out of 230 seats in the 4th parliament of the 4th republic. Asum Ahensah was elected with 12,027 votes out of 22,888total valid votes cast equivalent to 52.50% of total valid votes cast. He was elected over Kofi Oti Adinkrah of the New Patriotic Party, Twene Aduasare Kwasi of the Convention People's Party and M. Abdulai Freeman of the Democratic People's Party. These obtained 45.50%, 1.90% and 0.00% respectively of total votes cast.

Asum-Ahensah was re-elected as the Member of parliament for the Jaman North constituency in the 5th parliament for the 4th republic of Ghana on the ticket of the National Democratic Congress. He was elected with 13,359 of 24,166 total valid votes cast, equivalent to 55.28% of total valid votes cast. He was elected over Siaka Stevens of the New Patriotic Party, Otteng Atta Dickson of the People's National Convention and Nyuah Abraham Justice of the Convention People's Party. These obtained 42.94%, 1.04% and 0.74% of total valid votes cast.

== Personal life ==
Asum-Ahensah is married with six children. He is a Christian and worships with the Church of Pentecost.

== See also ==
  - List of Mills government ministers
  - Jaman North constituency

Parliament of Ghana
New title	Jaman North; 2005 – 2017	Succeeded by Siaka Stevens
Political offices
Preceded by Sampson Kwaku Boafo	Minister for Chieftaincy and Culture; 2009 – 2013	Succeeded by Henry Seidu Daanaa
