= Victor Emmanuel Smith =

Ghanaian diplomat and politician

Hon. Victor Emmanuel Smith
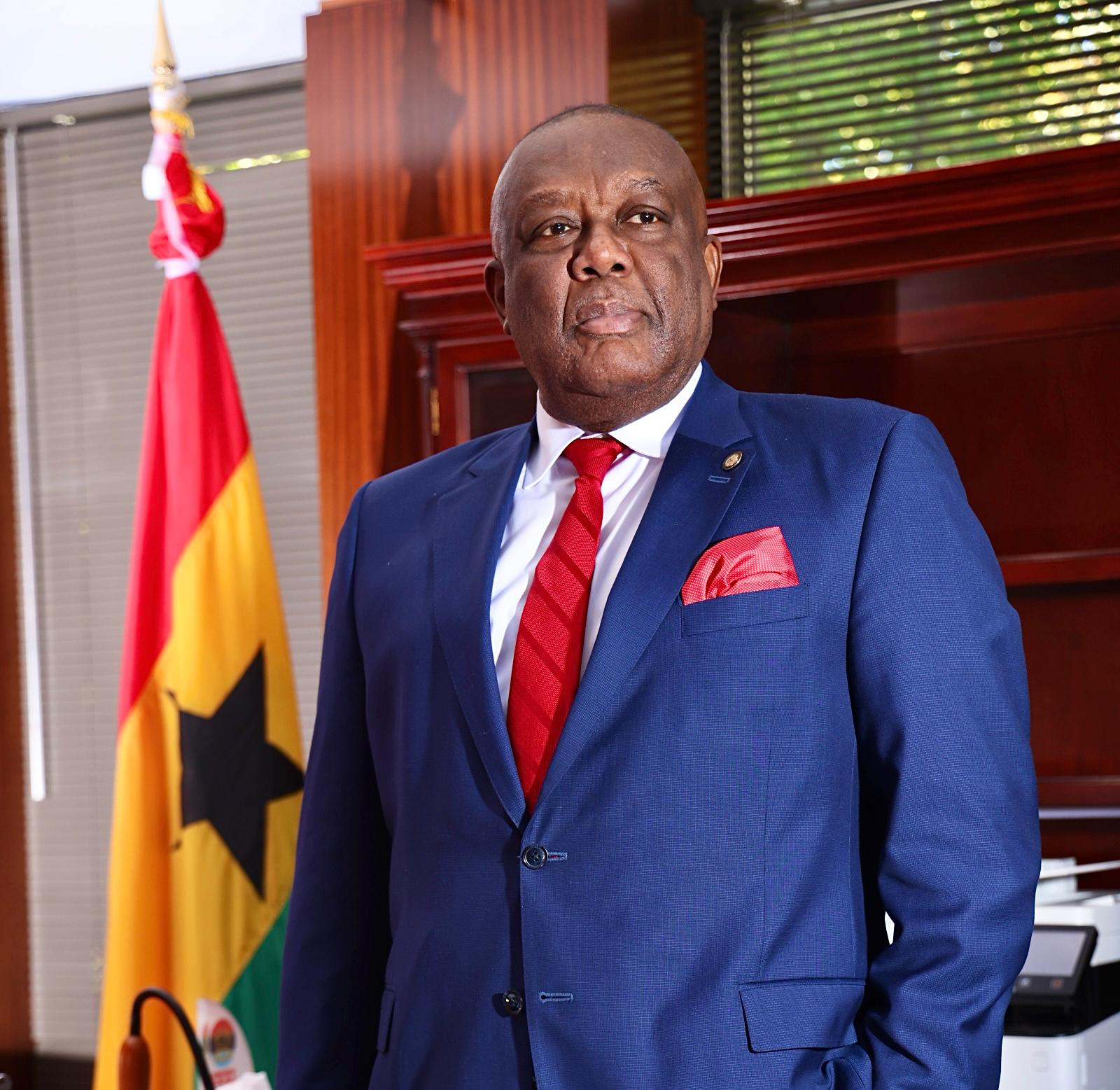

Ambassador Of Ghana to United States Of America
- In office 2025–Present
- President: John Dramani Mahama

High Commissioner to the United Kingdom and Ireland
- In office 2014–2017
- President: John Dramani Mahama

Regional Minister, Eastern Region
- In office 2012–2013
- President: John Dramani Mahama

Ambassador to the Czech Republic
- President: John Evans Atta Mills

Personal details
- Party: National Democratic Congress
- Education: University of Wales

Victor Emmanuel Smith is a Ghanaian diplomat, who has served as Ambassador to the United States since September 2025. He is a member of the National Democratic Congress.

== Early life and education ==
Smith was raised in Kukurantumi in the Eastern Region of Ghana. His father served as a police officer, while his mother was a royal from the Kukurantumi traditional area.

Smith attended St. Augustine’s College in Cape Coast, Ghana, earning both ‘O’ and ‘A’ Level certifications in 1976. He began pre-clinical medical studies at the Kwame Nkrumah University of Science & Technology in 1981, before going on to study in the United Kingdom.

He holds a BSc in Maritime Studies from the University of Wales Institute of Science and Technology and an MBA in International Business from the University of Wales Business School.

== Career ==
=== Early career ===
Smith began his professional career as a field sales manager at Leyland Motors in Accra, where he worked from 1985 to 1990. He later worked with the Department of Social Security in Hendon, London from 1990 to 1991 and then served as a consultant for Ghana's State Enterprises Commission from 1994 to 1995.

=== Politics ===
==== Presidential and advisory roles ====
From 1995 to 2001, he served as special assistant to First Lady Nana Konadu Agyeman-Rawlings. He later became special aide to former PresidentJerry Rawlings (2001–2008).

In 2009, Smith joined the administration of President John Atta Mills as a staffer.

=== Diplomatic career ===
Smith was appointed by President John Mahama to be Ambassador to the Czech Republic in 2010, with concurrent accreditation to Hungary and Slovakia.

From 2012 to 2013, Smith served as Regional Minister (Governor) for Ghana's Eastern Region.

Smith was appointed High Commissioner of Ghana to the United Kingdom, concurrently accredited to Ireland and the Commonwealth Secretariat.

In 2017, Smith founded Victor Smith & Associates, an Accra-based investment consultancy focused on facilitating foreign direct investment in West Africa.

In September 2025, Smith was appointed by Mahama as Ambassador to the United States.
