= Ephraim Avea Nsoh =

Ghanaian politician

Hon. Ephraim Avea Nsoh
- President: John Dramani Mahama

Personal details
- Born: Ghana
- Party: NDC

Ephraim Avea Nsoh is a Ghanaian politician and was the Upper East Regional Minister of Ghana. Prior to heading the Upper East Region, Ephraim Avea Nsoh was Upper West Regional Minister. He was appointed as principal of the College of Languages Education, University of Education. The appointment was a four-year contract which took effect from October 1, 2016.
