= Joe Oteng-Adjei =

Ghanaian Minister for Energy

Hon. Joe Oteng-Adjei

Minister for Energy
- President: John Atta Mills
- Preceded by: Felix Owusu-Adjapong
- Succeeded by: Emmanuel Armah Kofi Buah

Personal details
- Born: 3 May 1958 (age 68)
- Party: National Democratic Congress
- Spouse: Mrs Magaret Oteng-Adjei
- Education: Kwame Nkrumah University of Science and Technology

Joe Oteng-Adjei (born 3 May 1958) is a former Ghanaian Minister for Energy. He was appointed the Minister for Energy by late President John Evans Atta Mills in 2009.

== Early life and education ==
Joe Oteng-Adjei was born on 3 May 1958. Oteng-Adjei's undergraduate studies were at the Kwame Nkrumah University of Science and Technology where he obtained his first degree in 1980. He then did his master's degree and subsequently PhD in Canada on power systems at the University of Saskatchewan, Saskatoon, Canada between 1984 and 1987 on a Commonwealth Scholarship. He was admitted at Canfield University, Brentford, England where he pursued a Masters Degree in Business Administration majoring in Finance and Macro Economics.

== Political career ==
He was the Minister for Energy during President John Evans Atta Mills administration in 2009. He contested Bosomtwe seat in Ashanti Region from 1996, 2000 & 2008 elections. He was a member of National Campaign Team for National Democratic Congress 2008 Elections, a working Secretary, Manifesto Committee for NDC, 2008 Elections.

== Personal life ==
Joe Oteng-Adjei is married to Mrs Margaret Oteng-Adjei and blessed with children.

== See also ==
- List of Mills government ministers

Political offices
Preceded by Felix Owusu-Adjapong	Minister for Energy; 2009 – 2012	Succeeded by Emmanuel Armah Kofi Buah
