= Nii Laryea Afotey-Agbo =

Ghanaian politician

Hon. Joseph Nii Laryea Afotey-Agbo
- President: John Dramani Mahama

Personal details
- Born: Ghana
- Party: NDC

Joseph Nii Laryea Afotey-Agbo (born July 31, 1967) is a Ghanaian politician and was the Greater Accra Regional Minister of Ghana. Before this, he was the Volta Regional Minister. He is a member of the seventh Parliament of the Fourth Republic of Ghana representing the Kpone-Katamanso Constituency in the Greater Accra Region on the ticket of the National Democratic Congress (Ghana).

== Personal life ==
He is a Christian (Presbyterian) who is married with seven children. In 2016, he lost his brother in a car crash. The brother, known as Quaye, reportedly did not survive the fatal crash which happened on Thursday night, while traveling in a car around Ada.

== Early life and education ==
Afotey-Agbo was born on July 31, 1967. He hails from Katamanso-Nungua, a town in the Greater Accra Region of Ghana. He graduated from Ghana Institute of Journalism and obtained his diploma degree in public relations. He holds a Bachelor's Degree, Executive Master's Degree in Mechanical Engineering and Governance.

== Politics ==
Afotey-Agbo is a member of the National Democratic Congress (NDC). He is a member of Parliament representing Kpone-Katamanso Constituency in the 4th, 5th, 8th, and the current and 7th Parliament of the 4th Republic of Ghana. Serving as a committee member on committees on Environment, Science and Technology Committee, Youth, Sports and Culture Committee, and Privileges Committee. He served as the Minister of States between 2009 and 2012. He also served as Regional Minister of Greater Accra Region between 2012 and 2014.

== Career ==
He is the managing director (MD) of JNL Afotey-Agbo Ventures. He has been a Member of Parliament from January 2005 till date.
