= Samuel Sarpong =

Ghanaian politician (1957–2025)

Hon. Samuel Sarpong
- President: John Dramani Mahama

Personal details
- Born: 10 November 1957 Ejisu, Ashanti Region, Ghana
- Died: 6 August 2025 (aged 67) Adansi District, Ashanti Region, Ghana
- Party: NDC

Samuel Sarpong (10 November 1957 – 6 August 2025) was a Ghanaian politician and an Ashanti Region minister.

== Early life and education ==
Samuel Sarpong was born on 10 November 1957 at Ejisu in Ghana's Ashanti Region. He was the first of seven children born to Agnes Kwabena Mensah Sarpong and her husband. He attended Osei Tutu Senior High School in 1973, obtained his GCE O level certificate in 1978, and pursued a three-year teacher training education at Wesley College in Kumasi. From 1981 to 1984, Sarpong taught sports at Juabeng Secondary School.

== Career ==
From February to March 2013 and July 2015 to March 2015, Sarpong was the Ashanti Region minister. From March 2013 to July 2014 he was the Central Regional minister. At the time of his death he was vice chairman of Ghana's National Democratic Congress.

== Death ==
Sarpong died in a helicopter crash alongside other Ghanaian ministers of state on 6 August 2025. He and other victims of the crash were accorded a state funeral in Accra on 15 August that was attended by President John Mahama.

== Awards ==
Communal Visionary Leader (2021).
