= Presidency of John Kufuor =

Ghanaian presidential administration from 2001 to 2009

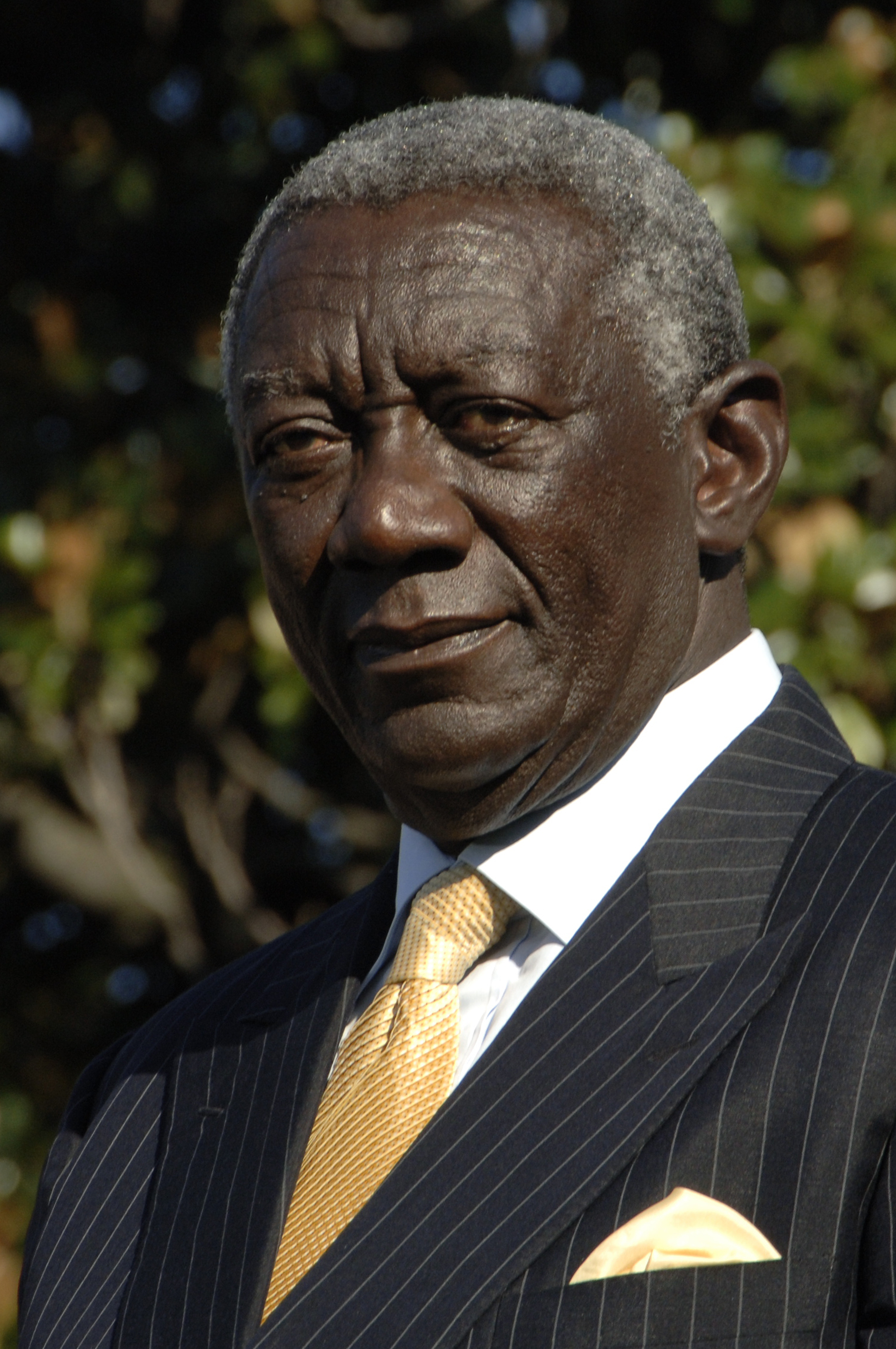
- Kufuor in 2008
- Presidency of John Kufuor; 7 January 2001 – 7 January 2009
- President: John Agyekum Kufuor
- Cabinet: See list
- Party: New Patriotic Party
- Election: 2000; 2004
- Seat: Jubilee House
- Seal of the President

The presidency of John Kufuor began on 7 January 2001 and ended on 7 January 2009 after he was inaugurated as the 2nd President of the Fourth Republic. Kufuor was a New Patriotic Party (NPP) candidate. He won the 2000 Ghanaian general election after defeating National Democratic Congress (NDC) candidate John Atta Mills by earning 56.9% of the votes. This marked Ghana's first transition of power through a free and fair election since independence. Kufuor ran for re-election in 2004, winning again against John Atta Mills, and served two full terms.

== First election ==
Results of both election rounds

The election began on 7 December 2000 with a second round of the presidential election on 28 December. The presidential elections resulted in a victory for John Kufuor of the New Patriotic Party (NPP), whilst the NPP also won the most seats in the parliamentary elections.

Kufuor had previously run unsuccessfully in the 1996 election, after winning the nomination of the New Patriotic Party (gaining 1034 votes out of the 2000 party delegates).

On 23 October 1998 Kufuor was once again re-nominated by the New Patriotic Party to run for president, while also officially becoming the leader of the party.

Kufuor won the presidential election of December 2000. In the first round of voting, held on 7 December 2000, Kufuor came in first place with 48.4%, while John Atta-Mills, the NDC candidate, came in second with 44.8%. This led to a run-off vote between the two. In the second round, held on 28 December, Kufuor won 56.9% of the vote and emerged victorious. Kufuor was sworn in on 7 January 2001. This was the first democratic changeover of government in the history of Ghana.

== Personnel ==
=== Ministers of state (2001–2005) ===
There was a cabinet reshuffle on April 1, 2003.

Portfolio	Minister	Time frame	Notes
President	John Kufuor	Jan 2001 - Jan 2005	
Vice President	Aliu Mahama	Jan 2001 - Jan 2005	
Minister for Foreign Affairs	Hackman Owusu-Agyeman; Nana Addo Dankwa Akufo-Addo	2001 – Apr 2003; Apr 2003 – 2007	
Minister for Interior	Malik Al-Hassan Yakubu; Hackman Owusu-Agyeman	2001 – 2002; 2003 – 2005	Resigned following Yendi conflict
Minister for Finance and Economic Planning	Yaw Osafo-Maafo	2001 – 2005	
Minister for Defence	Kwame Addo-Kufuor	7 Jan 2001 – 6 Aug 2007	
Attorney General and Minister for Justice	Nana Addo Dankwa Akufo-Addo; Papa Owusu Ankomah	2001 – 2003; 2003 – 2005	
Minister for Education later Minister for Education, Youth and Sports	Prof. Christopher Ameyaw Akumfi; Kwadwo Baah Wiredu	2001 – 2003; 2003 – 2005	
Minister for Health	Richard Winfred Anane; Dr. Kwaku Afriyie	2001 – 2003; 2003 – 2005	
Minister for Food and Agriculture	Major Courage Quashigah	2001 – 2005	
Minister for Fisheries	Ishmael Ashitey	2001 – 2005	
Minister for Trade and Industry	Dr. Kofi Konadu Apraku; Alan Kyeremanteng	2001 – 2003; 2003 – 2007	
Ministry for Local Government and Rural Development	Kwadwo Baah-Wiredu; Kwadwo Adjei Darko	2001 – 2003; 2003 – 2005	
Minister for Manpower Development and Employment	Cecilia Ladze Bannermann; Yaw Barimah	2001 – 2003; 2003 – 2005	
Minister for Energy	Albert Kan Dapaah; Dr. Paa Kwesi Nduom (CPP)	2001 – 2003; 2003 – 2005	
Minister for Mines	Cecilia Ladze Bannermann	2003 – 2005	
Minister for Lands, Mines and Forestry	Dr. Kwaku Afriyie; Prof. Dominic Fobih	2001 – 2003; 2003 – present	
Minister for Works and Housing	Kwamena Bartels; Alhaji Mustapha Idris Ali	2001 – 2003; 2003 – 2005	
Minister for Women and Children's Affairs	Mrs. Gladys Asmah	2001 – 2005	
Minister for Tourism later Minister for Tourism and Modernisation of the Capital City	Hawa Yakubu; Jake Obetsebi Lamptey	2001 – May 2002; 2003 – 2007	
Minister for Environment, Science and Technology later Minister for Science and Environment	Prof. Dominic Kwaku Fobih; Prof. Mike Oquaye; Prof. Kasim Kasanga	2001 – 2003; 2003 – 2005	
Minister for Public Sector Reform and National Institutional Renewal Programme	Joseph Henry Mensah	2003 – 2005	
Minister for Presidential Affairs	Jake Obetsebi Lamptey	2001 – 2003	
Minister for Parliamentary Affairs	Felix Owusu-Adjapong	2003 – 2007	
Minister and Leader of Government Business	Joseph Henry Mensah	2001 – 2003	
Minister for Roads, Highways later Minister for Roads, Highways and Transport	Kwadwo Adjei-Darko; Richard Winfred Anane	2001 – 2003; 2003 – 2006	
Minister for Ports, Harbours and Railways	Prof.Christopher Ameyaw-Akumfi	2003 – present	
Minister for Regional Co-Operation and NEPAD	Dr. Paa Kwesi Nduom (CPP); Dr. Kofi Konadu Apraku	? – 2003; 2003 – 2006	
Minister for Transport and Communications	Felix Owusu-Adjapong	2001 – 2003	
Minister for Communications and Technology	Albert Kan Dapaah	2003 – 2006	
Minister for Private Sector Development	Charles Omar Nyannor; Kwamena Bartels	2001 – 2003; 2003 – ?	
Minister for Information	Jake Obetsebi Lamptey; Nana Akomea	? – 2003; 2003 – 2005	
Minister for Youth and Sports	Alhaji Mallam Issah	2001	
Minister of State (media relations)	Elizabeth Ohene	2001 – ?	
Minister of State for primary, secondary and girl-child education	Christine Churcher	2001 – 2005	
Regional Ministers
Ashanti Regional Minister	Sampson Kwaku Boafo		
Brong Ahafo Region	Ernest Debrah		
Central Region	Isaac Edumadze		
Eastern Region	Dr. S.K. Osafo Mensah		
Greater Accra Regional Minister	Sheikh I.C. Quaye		
Northern Region	Prince Imoru Andani; Ben Salifu	2001 – 2002; 2002 – ?	Resigned following Yendi conflict
Upper East Region	Mohamed Salifu		
Upper West Region	Mogtari Sahanun		
Volta Regional Minister	Kwasi Owusu-Yeboah		
Western Region	Joseph Boahen Aidoo		

=== Ministers of state (2005–2009) ===
There was a cabinet reshuffle on 28 April 2006. There was a second cabinet reshuffle to release ministers with presidential ambitions in July 2007.

Portfolio	Minister	Time frame	Notes
President	John Kufuor	January 2001 – January 2009	
Vice President	Aliu Mahama	January 2001 – January 2009	
Minister for Foreign Affairs later Minister for Foreign Affairs, Regional Integration and NEPAD	Nana Addo Dankwa Akufo-Addo; Akwasi Osei-Agyei	Apr 2003 – Jul 2007; Jul 2007 – January 2009	
Minister for Interior	Papa Owusu-Ankomah; Albert Kan Dapaah; Kwamena Bartels; Kwame Addo-Kufuor	2005 – 2006; 2006 – 2007; 2007 – 2008; 2008 – January 2009	
Minister for Finance and Economic Planning	Kwadwo Baah Wiredu; Dr. Anthony Akoto Osei	2005 – 2007; 2007 – January 2009	
Minister for Defence	Kwame Addo-Kufuor; Albert Kan Dapaah	2001 – 2007; 6 Aug 2007 – 6 Jan 2009	
Minister for National Security	Francis Poku	2006 – January 2009	New portfolio
Attorney General and Minister for Justice	J. Ayikoi Otoo; Joe Ghartey; Ambrose Dery	2005 – 2006; 2006 – 2007; 2007 – January 2009	
Minister for Health	Major Courage Quashigah (rtd)	2005 – January 2009	
Minister for Education and Sports later Minister for Education, Science and Sports	Yaw Osafo-Maafo; Papa Owusu Ankomah; Dominic Fobi	2005 – 2006; 2006 – 2007; 2007 – January 2009	
Minister for Food and Agriculture	Ernest Akubuor Debrah	2005 – January 2009	
Minister for Fisheries	Gladys Asmah	2005 – January 2009	
Minister for Trade and Industry (later); Minister for Trade and Industry, Private Sector Development and President's Special Initiative	Alan Kyeremanteng; Joe Baidoo Ansah; Papa Owusu Ankomah	2003 – 2007; 2007 – 2008; 2008 – January 2009	
Minister for Private Sector Development & President's Special Initiative	Kwamena Bartels	2005 – 2006	Ministry merged with Trade and Industry
Minister for Local Government and Rural Development later Minister for Local Government, Rural Development and Environment	Charles Bimpong Bintim; Stephen Asamoah-Boateng; Kwadwo Adjei-Darko	2005 – 2006; 2006 – 2007; 2007 – January 2009	
Minister for Information later Minister for Information and National Orientation	Daniel Kwaku Botwe; Kwamena Bartels; Oboshie Sai-Cofie	2005 – 2006; 2006 – 2007; 2007 – January 2009	
Minister for Tourism and Modernisation of the Capital City later Minister for Tourism and Diasporean Relations	Jake Obetsebi Lamptey; Stephen Asamoah-Boateng	2003 – 2007; 2007 – January 2009	
Minister for Works and Housing later Minister for Water Resources, Works and Housing	Hackman Owusu-Agyeman; Boniface Abubakar Saddique	2005 – 2007; 2007 – January 2009	
Minister for Public Sector Reform	Dr. Paa Kwesi Nduom (CPP); Samuel Owusu-Agyei	2005 – 2007; 2007 – January 2009	
Minister for Communication	Albert Kan Dapaah; Prof. Mike Oquaye; Dr. Ben Aggrey Ntim	2005 – 2006; 2006 – 2007; 2007 – January 2009	
Minister for Roads and Highways	Richard Winfred Anane vacant Godfred T. Bonyon	2005 – 2006; 2006 – 2007; 2007 – January 2009	Resigned after adverse findings against him by the CHRAJ.
Minister for Ports, Harbours and Railways	Prof.Christopher Ameyaw Akumfi	2001 – January 2009	
Minister for Aviation	Gloria Akuffo	2006 – January 2009	Newly created ministry
Minister for Energy	Prof. Mike Oquaye; Joseph Kofi Adda; Felix Owusu-Adjapong	2005 – 2006; 2006 – 2008; 2008 – January 2009	
Minister for Lands, Forestry and Mines	Prof. Dominic Fobih; Esther Obeng Dapaah	2003 – 2007; 2007 – January 2009	
Minister for Environment and Science	Christine Churcher	2005 – 2006	
Minister for Regional Co-Operation and NEPAD	Dr. Kofi Konadu Apraku	2003 – 2006	
Minister for Women and Children's Affairs	Hajia Alima Mahama	2005 – January 2009	
Minister for Manpower Development and Employment now Ministry for Manpower, Youth and Employment	Joseph Kofi Adda; Boniface Abubakar Saddique; Nana Akomea	2005 – 2006; 2006 – 2007; 2007 – January 2009	
Minister of State for Culture and Chieftaincy	Sampson Kwaku Boafo	2006 – January 2009	New portfolio
Minister for Presidential Affairs	Kwadwo Mpiani	2005 – January 2009	
Minister for Parliamentary Affairs	Felix Owusu-Adjapong; Abraham Ossei Aidooh	2001 – 2007; 2007 – January 2009	
Senior Minister	Joseph Henry Mensah	2005 – 2006	
Regional Ministers
Ashanti Regional Minister	Sampson Kwaku Boafo; Emmanuel A. Owusu-Ansah	2005 – 2006; 2006 – January 2009	
Brong Ahafo Region	Nana Kwadwo Seinti; Ignatius Baffour Awuah	2005 – 2006; 2006 – January 2009	
Central Region	Isaac E. Edumadze; Nana Ato Arthur	2005 – 2006; 2006 – January 2009	
Eastern Region	Yaw Barimah; Kwadwo Afram Asiedu	2005 – 2007; 2007 – January 2009	
Greater Accra Regional Minister	Shiekh Ibrahim Cudjoe Quaye	2005 – January 2009	
Northern Region	Boniface Abubakar Saddique; Alhaji Mustapha Ali Idris	2005 – 2006; 2006 – January 2009	
Upper East Region	Boniface Agambila; Alhassan Samari	2005 – 2007; 2007 – January 2009	
Upper West Region	Ambrose Dery; George Hikah Benson	2005 – 2007; 2007 – January 2009	
Volta Regional Minister	Kofi Dzamesi	2005 – January 2009	
Western Region	Joseph Boahen Aidoo; Evans A. Amoah	2005 – 2006; 2006 – January 2009	

== Policy ==
The National Reconciliation Commission was formed in 2004 to investigate human rights abuses committed by previous Ghanaian military juntas and unconstitutional governments.

=== Health ===
Kufuor's National Health Insurance Scheme replaced the existent cash-and-carry system. About 11 million Ghanaians were registered under the new scheme. As president, Kufuor was credited for setting up Ghana's National Ambulance Service.

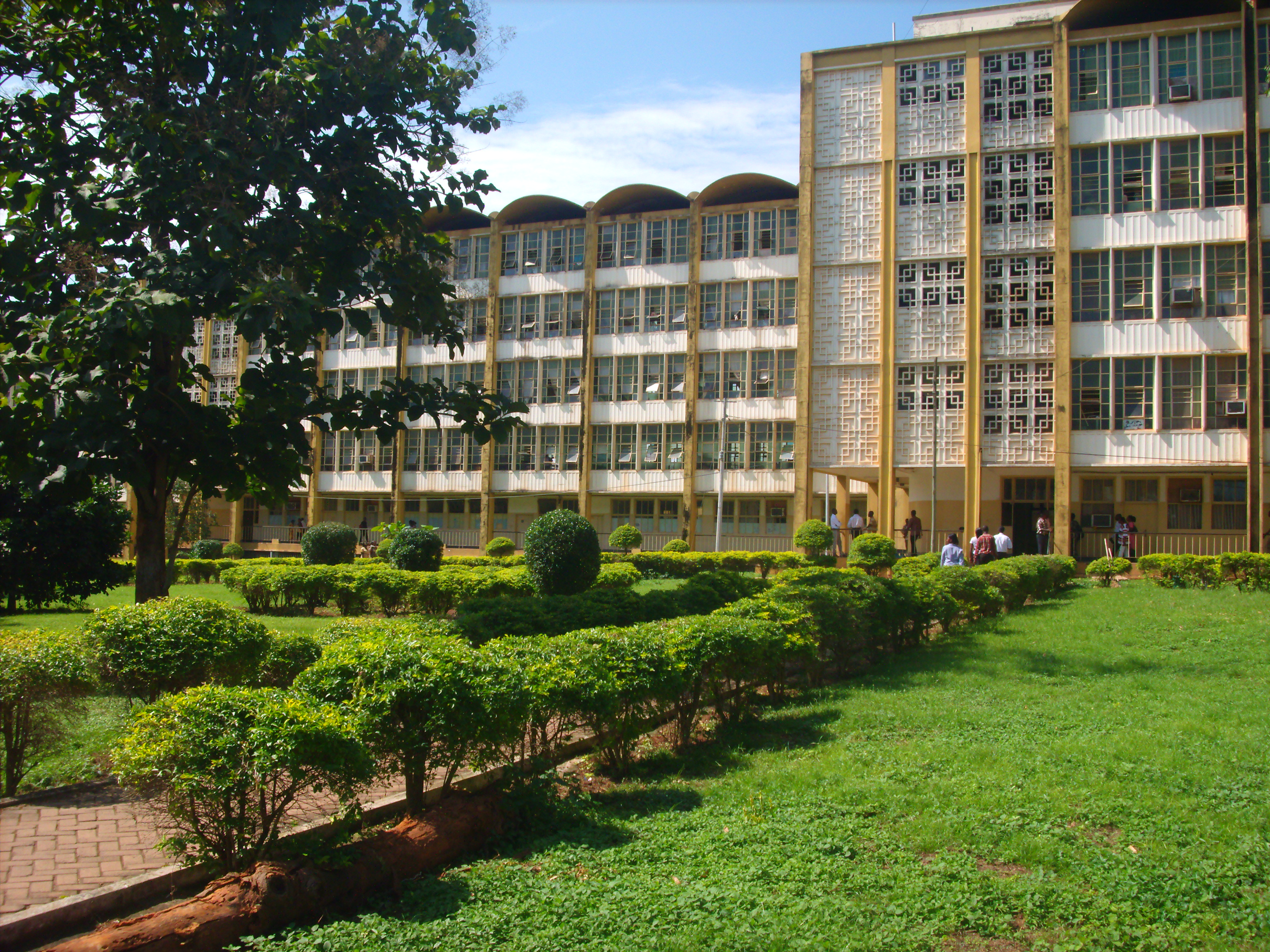
The KATH received an Accident and Emergency Centre.

About 205 hospitals and clinics were constructed and renovated during Kufuor's presidency. This included the addition of the Accident and Emergency Centre at the Komfo Anokye Teaching Hospital, which became the largest in Ghana upon completion. Kufuor also introduced free maternal health care in public hospitals.

=== Education ===
Kufuor initiated Ghana's national school feeding programme. He institutionalised the capitation grant for school children at the basic level as each student was entitled to $2 for cultural sports and development. During the Kufuor administration, an additional year was added to the Senior Secondary School curriculum, changing it from three years to four years. It was also renamed Senior High School. He started the model school senior high school initiative to upgrade some deprived schools to the level of some first-class senior high schools.

=== Infrastructure ===
There was a complete renovation of the Accra Sports Stadium and the Baba Yara Stadium as well as the newly built Essipong and Tamale stadium in 2008, in order to enhance Ghana's hosting of the CAN 2008. On 27 February 2004, the president commissioned the Tetteh Quarshie Interchange for traffic.

President Kufuor obtained a record $500 million grant from the US's Millennium Challenge Account for economic development. The fund was anchored on unleashing the entrepreneurial, creative and innovative potential of Ghanaians as a means of creating wealth as well as removing all barriers in the form of social challenges Ghanaians faced. This socio-economic vision included the Five Priority Areas Programme: the pursuit of good governance, modernisation of agriculture for rural development, private sector participation, enhanced social services, and vigorous infrastructural development. The fund also served as the source of finance for the construction of the George Walker Bush Highway.

== Re-election ==
Election results

Four candidates contested the 2004 Ghanaian general election.

Kufuor was re-elected in presidential and parliamentary elections held on 7 December 2004, earning 52.45% of the popular vote in the first round. This avoided a run-off and resulted in the New Patriotic Party securing more seats in the Parliament of Ghana.

=== Coinciding parliamentary elections ===
Kufuor's New Patriotic Party won 128 seats in parliament, for a governing majority of 26.

Affiliation	Members
New Patriotic Party (NPP)	128
National Democratic Congress (NDC)	94
People's National Convention (PNC)	4
Convention People's Party (CPP)	3
Independent	1
Speaker and Deputies	(3)
Total	230
Government Majority	26

== See also ==
- Aliu Mahama
