= Kufuor government =

This is a list of the ministers who have served in John Kufuor's New Patriotic Party government during the Fourth Republic of Ghana. This government started on January 7, 2001, the first changeover between civilian governments in Ghana through the ballot box. Kufuor also won the 2004 elections and served his second term of office ending January 2009.

== List of ministers of state (2001–2005) ==
Portfolio	Minister	Time frame	Notes
President	John Kufuor	Jan 2001 - Jan 2005	
Vice President	Aliu Mahama	Jan 2001 - Jan 2005	
Minister for Foreign Affairs	Hackman Owusu-Agyeman; Nana Addo Dankwa Akufo-Addo	2001 – Apr 2003; Apr 2003 – 2007	
Minister for Interior	Malik Al-Hassan Yakubu; Hackman Owusu-Agyeman	2001 – 2002; 2003 – 2005	Resigned following Yendi conflict
Minister for Finance	Yaw Osafo-Maafo	2001 – 2005	
Minister for Defence	Kwame Addo-Kufuor	7 Jan 2001 – 6 Aug 2007	
Attorney General and Minister for Justice	Nana Addo Dankwa Akufo-Addo; Papa Owusu-Ankomah	2001 – 2003; 2003 – 2005	
Minister for Education later Minister for Education, Youth and Sports	Prof. Christopher Ameyaw Akumfi; Kwadwo Baah Wiredu	2001 – 2003; 2003 – 2005	
Minister for Health	Richard Winfred Anane; Dr. Kwaku Afriyie	2001 – 2003; 2003 – 2005	
Minister for Food and Agriculture	Major Courage Quashigah	2001 – 2005	
Minister for Fisheries	Ishmael Ashitey	2001 – 2005	
Minister for Trade and Industry	Dr. Kofi Konadu Apraku; Alan Kyeremanteng	2001 – 2003; 2003 – 2007	
Ministry for Local Government and Rural Development	Kwadwo Baah-Wiredu; Kwadwo Adjei Darko	2001 – 2003; 2003 – 2005	
Minister for Economic Planning	Paa Kwesi Nduom	2001 – 2003	
Minister for Manpower Development and Employment	Cecilia Ladze Bannermann; Yaw Barimah	2001 – 2003; 2003 – 2005	
Minister for Energy	Albert Kan Dapaah; Dr. Paa Kwesi Nduom (CPP)	2001 – 2003; 2003 – 2005	
Minister for Mines	Cecilia Ladze Bannermann	2003 – 2005	
Minister for Lands, Mines and Forestry	Dr. Kwaku Afriyie; Prof. Dominic Fobih	2001 – 2003; 2003 – present	
Minister for Works and Housing	Kwamena Bartels; Alhaji Mustapha Idris Ali	2001 – 2003; 2003 – 2005	
Minister for Women and Children's Affairs	Mrs. Gladys Asmah	2001 – 2005	
Minister for Tourism later Minister for Tourism and Modernisation of the Capital City	Hawa Yakubu; Jake Obetsebi Lamptey	2001 – May 2002; 2003 – 2007	
Minister for Environment, Science and Technology later Minister for Science and Environment	Prof. Dominic Kwaku Fobih; Prof. Mike Oquaye; Prof. Kasim Kasanga	2001 – 2003; 2003 – 2005	
Minister for Public Sector Reform and National Institutional Renewal Programme	Joseph Henry Mensah	2003 – 2005	
Minister for Presidential Affairs	Jake Obetsebi Lamptey	2001 – 2003	
Minister for Parliamentary Affairs	Felix Owusu-Adjapong	2003 – 2007	
Minister and Leader of Government Business	Joseph Henry Mensah	2001 – 2003	
Minister for Roads, Highways later Minister for Roads, Highways and Transport	Kwadwo Adjei-Darko; Richard Winfred Anane	2001 – 2003; 2003 – 2006	
Minister for Ports, Harbours and Railways	Prof.Christopher Ameyaw-Akumfi	2003 – present	
Minister for Regional Co-Operation and NEPAD	Dr. Paa Kwesi Nduom (CPP); Dr. Kofi Konadu Apraku	? – 2003; 2003 – 2006	
Minister for Transport and Communications	Felix Owusu-Adjapong	2001 – 2003	
Minister for Communications and Technology	Albert Kan Dapaah	2003 – 2006	
Minister for Private Sector Development	Charles Omar Nyanor; Kwamena Bartels	2001 – 2003; 2003 – ?	
Minister for Information	Jake Obetsebi Lamptey; Nana Akomea	? – 2003; 2003 – 2005	
Minister for Youth and Sports	Alhaji Mallam Issah	2001	
Minister of State (media relations)	Elizabeth Ohene	2001 – ?	
Minister of State for primary, secondary and girl-child education	Christine Churcher	2001 – 2005	
Regional Ministers
Ashanti Regional Minister	Sampson Kwaku Boafo		
Brong Ahafo Region	Ernest Debrah		
Central Regional Minister	Isaac Edumadze		
Eastern Regional Minister	Dr. S.K. Osafo Mensah		
Greater Accra Regional Minister	Sheikh I.C. Quaye		
Northern Regional Minister	Ben Salifu; Prince Imoru Andani^{‡} Ernest Akobuor Debrah	February – November 2001; November 2001 – May 2003; May 2003 – February 2005	^{‡}Resigned following Yendi conflict
Upper East Region	Mohamed Salifu		
Upper West Region	Mogtari Sahanun		
Volta Regional Minister	Kwasi Owusu-Yeboah		
Western Region	Joseph Boahen Aidoo		

- NB. There was a cabinet reshuffle on April 1, 2003.

== List of ministers of state (2005–2009) ==
Portfolio	Minister	Time frame	Notes
President	John Kufuor	January 2001 – January 2009	
Vice President	Aliu Mahama	January 2001 – January 2009	
Minister for Foreign Affairs later Minister for Foreign Affairs, Regional Integration and NEPAD	Nana Addo Dankwa Akufo-Addo; Akwasi Osei-Agyei	Apr 2003 – Jul 2007; Jul 2007 – January 2009	
Minister for Interior	Papa Owusu-Ankomah; Albert Kan Dapaah; Kwamena Bartels; Kwame Addo-Kufuor	2005 – 2006; 2006 – 2007; 2007 – 2008; 2008 – January 2009	
Minister for Finance and Economic Planning	Kwadwo Baah Wiredu; Dr. Anthony Akoto Osei	2005 – 2007; 2007 – January 2009	
Minister for Defence	Kwame Addo-Kufuor; Albert Kan Dapaah	2001 – 2007; 6 Aug 2007 – 6 Jan 2009	
Minister for National Security	Francis Poku	2006 – January 2009	New portfolio
Attorney General and Minister for Justice	J. Ayikoi Otoo; Joe Ghartey; Ambrose Dery	2005 – 2006; 2006 – 2007; 2007 – January 2009	
Minister for Health	Major Courage Quashigah (rtd)	2005 – January 2009	
Minister for Education and Sports later Minister for Education, Science and Sports	Yaw Osafo-Maafo; Papa Owusu Ankomah; Dominic Fobi	2005 – 2006; 2006 – 2007; 2007 – January 2009	
Minister for Food and Agriculture	Ernest Akubuor Debrah	2005 – January 2009	
Minister for Fisheries	Gladys Asmah	2005 – January 2009	
Minister for Trade and Industry (later); Minister for Trade and Industry, Private Sector Development and President's Special Initiative	Alan Kyeremanteng; Joe Baidoo Ansah; Papa Owusu Ankomah	2003 – 2007; 2007 – 2008; 2008 – January 2009	
Minister for Private Sector Development & President's Special Initiative	Kwamena Bartels	2005 – 2006	Ministry merged with Trade and Industry
Minister for Local Government and Rural Development later Minister for Local Government, Rural Development and Environment	Charles Bimpong Bintim; Stephen Asamoah-Boateng; Kwadwo Adjei-Darko	2005 – 2006; 2006 – 2007; 2007 – January 2009	
Minister for Information later Minister for Information and National Orientation	Daniel Kwaku Botwe; Kwamena Bartels; Florence Oboshie Sai-Coffie Stephen Asamoah Boateng	2005 – 2006; 2006 – 2007; 2007 – 2008 2008 – January 2009	
Minister for Tourism and Modernisation of the Capital City later Minister for Tourism and Diasporean Relations	Jake Obetsebi Lamptey; Stephen Asamoah-Boateng Florence Oboshie Sai-Coffie	2003 – 2007; 2007 – 2008 2008 – January 2009	
Minister for Works and Housing later Minister for Water Resources, Works and Housing	Hackman Owusu-Agyeman; Boniface Abubakar Saddique	2005 – 2007; 2007 – January 2009	
Minister for Public Sector Reform	Dr. Paa Kwesi Nduom (CPP); Samuel Owusu-Agyei	2005 – 2007; 2007 – January 2009	
Minister for Communication	Albert Kan Dapaah; Prof. Mike Oquaye; Dr. Ben Aggrey Ntim	2005 – 2006; 2006 – 2007; 2007 – January 2009	
Minister for Roads and Highways	Richard Winfred Anane vacant Godfred T. Boyon	2005 – 2006; 2006 – 2007; 2007 – January 2009	Resigned after adverse findings against him by the CHRAJ.
Minister for Ports, Harbours and Railways	Prof.Christopher Ameyaw Akumfi	2001 – January 2009	
Minister for Aviation	Gloria Akuffo	2006 – January 2009	Newly created ministry
Minister for Energy	Prof. Mike Oquaye; Joseph Kofi Adda; Felix Owusu-Adjapong	2005 – 2006; 2006 – 2008; 2008 – January 2009	
Minister for Lands, Forestry and Mines	Prof. Dominic Fobih; Esther Obeng Dapaah	2003 – 2007; 2007 – January 2009	
Minister for Environment and Science	Christine Churcher	2005 – 2006	
Minister for Regional Co-Operation and NEPAD	Dr. Kofi Konadu Apraku	2003 – 2006	
Minister for Women and Children's Affairs	Hajia Alima Mahama	2005 – January 2009	
Minister for Manpower Development and Employment now Ministry for Manpower, Youth and Employment	Joseph Kofi Adda; Boniface Abubakar Saddique; Nana Akomea	2005 – 2006; 2006 – 2007; 2007 – January 2009	
Minister of State for Culture and Chieftaincy	Sampson Kwaku Boafo	2006 – January 2009	New portfolio
Minister for Presidential Affairs	Kwadwo Mpiani	2005 – January 2009	
Minister for Parliamentary Affairs	Felix Owusu-Adjapong; Abraham Ossei Aidooh	2001 – 2007; 2007 – January 2009	
Senior Minister	Joseph Henry Mensah	2005 – 2006	
Regional Ministers
Ashanti Regional Minister	Sampson Kwaku Boafo; Emmanuel A. Owusu-Ansah	2005 – 2006; 2006 – January 2009	
Brong Ahafo Region	Nana Kwadwo Seinti; Ignatius Baffour Awuah	2005 – 2006; 2006 – January 2009	
Central Regional Minister	Isaac E. Edumadze; Nana Ato Arthur	2005 – 2006; 2006 – January 2009	
Eastern Regional Minister	Yaw Barimah; Kwadwo Afram Asiedu	2005 – 2007; 2007 – January 2009	
Greater Accra Regional Minister	Shiekh Ibrahim Cudjoe Quaye	2005 – January 2009	
Northern Regional Minister	Boniface Abubakar Saddique; Alhaji Mustapha Ali Idris	2005 – 2006; 2006 – January 2009	
Upper East Region	Boniface Agambila; Alhassan Samari	2005 – 2007; 2007 – January 2009	
Upper West Region	Ambrose Dery; George Hikah Benson	2005 – 2007; 2007 – January 2009	
Volta Regional Minister	Kofi Dzamesi	2005 – January 2009	
Western Region	Joseph Boahen Aidoo; Evans A. Amoah	2005 – 2006; 2006 – January 2009	

There was a cabinet reshuffle on 28 April 2006.
There was a second cabinet reshuffle to release ministers with presidential ambitions in July 2007.

== See also ==
- New Patriotic Party

Preceded by Rawlings government (1993–2001)	Government of Ghana; 2001–2009	Succeeded by Mills government (2009–2012)
