= Northern Regional Minister =

Ghana government official

The Northern Regional Minister is the Ghana government official who is responsible for overseeing the administration of the Northern Region of Ghana. The boundaries of the Northern Region have changed at various times in Ghana's history. Following the December 2018 referendums, the North East Region has been carved out of it. There are currently sixteen administrative regions in Ghana.

== List of Northern Regional Ministers ==
Number	Minister	Took office	Left office	Government	Party
1	Emmanuel Adama Mahama (MP)	1964		Nkrumah government	Convention Peoples' Party
2	J. M. Kporvi	1966	1967	National Liberation Council	Military government
3	Col. D. Laryea	1967	1968	National Liberation Council	Military government
4	Seth Birikiorang	1968	1969	National Liberation Council	Military government
5	H. A. Nuamah	1969	1969	National Liberation Council	Military government
6	J. A. Braimah	1969	1972	Busia government	Progress Party
7	Lt. Colonel D. A. Iddisah	1972	?	National Redemption Council	Military government
8	Colonel P. K. Agyekum	1973	April 1974	National Redemption Council	Military government
9	Lt. Colonel Festus F. Addae	April 1974	9 October 1975	National Redemption Council	Military government
10	Major R. K. Zumah	9 October 1975	1978	Supreme Military Council	Military government
11	Lt. Colonel L. K. Kodjiku	1978	1979	Supreme Military Council	Military government
11	Lt. Colonel L. K. Kodjiku	June 1979	September 1979	Armed Forces Revolutionary Council	Military government
12	Alhaji I. Haruna	?	?	Limann government	People's National Party
13	Thomas Ibrahim	1982	?	Provisional National Defence Council	Military government
14	D. S. Zachariah	1986	?	Provisional National Defence Council	Military government
15	Abdulai Ibrahim	?	?	Rawlings government	National Democratic Congress
16	Seidu Iddi	?	?	Rawlings government	National Democratic Congress
17	Ben Salifu	February 2001	November 2001	Kufuor government	New Patriotic Party
18	Prince Imoru Andani	November 2001	May 2003	Kufuor government	New Patriotic Party
19	Ernest Debrah	May 2003	February 2005	Kufuor government	New Patriotic Party
20	Boniface Abubakar Siddique	2005	2006	Kufuor government	New Patriotic Party
21	Mustapha Ali Idris	2006	January 2009	Kufuor government	New Patriotic Party
22	S.S. Nanyina	2009	2010	Mills government	National Democratic Congress
23	Moses Bukari Mabengba	2010	July 2012	Mills government	National Democratic Congress
23	Moses Bukari Mabengba	July 2012	March 2013	Mahama government	National Democratic Congress
24	Bede Ziedeng	March 2013	July 2014	Mahama government	National Democratic Congress
25	Limuna Mohammed Muniru	July 2014	January 2017	Mahama government	National Democratic Congress
26	Salifu Saeed	February 2017	March 2021	Akufo-Addo government	New Patriotic Party
27	Alhaji Shani Alhassan Saibu	March 2021	January 2025	Akufo-Addo government	New Patriotic Party
28	Ali Adolf John	January 2025	Incumbent	Mahama government (from 2025)	National Democratic Congress

== See also ==
- Ministers of the Ghanaian Government
- Northern Region
