= Norrip Village =

Community in Ghana, West Africa

Coordinates: 09°27′21″N 00°51′03″W

Norrip Village is a community in the Northern Region of Ghana,Tamale West Africa.
