= George Buadi =

Ghanaian politician

Hon. George Buadi
- In office 7 January 1993 – 6 January 1997

Member of parliament for Amenfi East constituency
- In office 7 January 1997 – 6 January 2001
- President: John Jerry Rawlings
- Succeeded by: Joseph Boahen Aidoo

Personal details
- Born: 3 July 1963 Amenfi East, Western region, Ghana)
- Party: National Democratic Congress
- Education: University of Ghana
- Occupation: Politician
- Profession: Lawyer

George Buadi (born 3 July 1963) is a Ghanaian politician and a member of the First and Second Parliament of the Fourth Republic representing the Amenfi East constituency in the Western Region of Ghana.

== Early life and education ==
Buadi was born on 3 July 1963, at Amenfi East in the Western Region of Ghana. He attended the University of Ghana and the Ghana School of Law and obtained his Bachelor of Arts and Bachelor of Law after studying political science and law.

== Politics ==
Buadi was first elected into Parliament on the ticket of the National Democratic Congress for the Amenfi East Constituency in the Western region in the December 1992 Ghanaian parliamentary elections. He was re-elected into Parliament during the 1996 Ghanaian general elections with 15,890 votes out of the 30,639 valid votes cast representing 38.30% over Doris Gyapomah Oduro of the New Patriotic Party who polled 11,638 votes representing 28.10% and Eric Coffie of the National Convention Party who polled 3,111 representing 7.50%. He was defeated by Joseph Boahen Aidoo of the New Patriotic Party who polled 14,578 votes representing 55.90% out of the 100% votes cast.

== Career ==
Buadi is a lawyer by profession aside from being a Ghanaian politician.

== Personal life ==
Buadi is a Christian.
