= Boyon =

Boyon is a surname. Notable people with the surname include:

- Godfred T. Boyon, Ghanaian politician
- Jacques Boyon (1934–2019), French politician
