= Joseph Henry Mensah =

Ghanaian politician and economist (1928–2018)

The Honorable Joseph Henry Mensah MP

Senior Minister
- In office 2001–2003

Minister and Leader of Government Business
- In office 2001–2003

Minister for Public Sector Reform and National Institutional Renewal Programme
- In office 2003–2005
- President: John Kufuor

Minister for Finance
- In office 1969–1972
- President: Edward Akufo-Addo
- Prime Minister: Kofi Abrefa Busia
- Preceded by: Emmanuel Noi Omaboe
- Succeeded by: Ignatius Kutu Acheampong

Member of the Ghana Parliament for Sunyani East
- In office 7 January 1997 – 6 January 2009

Personal details
- Born: 31 October 1928 Gold Coast
- Died: 12 July 2018 (aged 89) Accra, Ghana
- Resting place: Military Cemetery, Burma Camp, Accra, Ghana
- Party: New Patriotic Party
- Relations: Theresa Kufuor (sister); John Kufuor (brother-in-law)
- Education: University of the Gold Coast (now the University of Ghana) Achimota School University of London Stanford University
- Profession: Economist; Politician

Joseph Henry Mensah (31 October 1928 – 12 July 2018) was a Ghanaian politician and economist.

== Education ==
J. H. Mensah attended St Peter’s Cathedral School in Kumasi between 1934 and 1941 and then Achimota School in Accra, matriculating in 1947. He proceeded to the University of the Gold Coast (now the University of Ghana) in Legon, where he was in the pioneer 1948 group of students, and studied there until 1954, earning a bachelor's degree in economics. He then enrolled with the London School of Economics of the University of London in England and Stanford University in California, where he earned a master's degree, specialising in economic theory and development. In 1954, Mensah became a research fellow in economics at the University of Ghana (then still the University of the Gold Coast), a position he held until 1958.

== Political career ==
Mensah began working as an assistant inspector of taxes in 1953 while the Gold Coast was still under colonial rule. In 1958, he joined the United Nations Secretariat at the Centre for Development Planning, Projections and Policies in New York City, United States. He returned to Ghana in 1961 as the head of agency at the National Planning Commission. The National Planning Commission drafted and implemented Ghana’s Seven-Year Development Plan (1963/64–1969/70). In 1969, he was elected to parliament and became first the minister of finance and economic planning and then the finance minister in the Busia government until 1972, when he was replaced by the future head of state Ignatius Kutu Acheampong after a coup d’état by the Ghana Armed Forces.

== Elections ==
Mensah represented the Sunyani East constituency in the second, third and fourth parliaments of the Republic of Ghana.

=== 2000 election ===
In the year 2000, Mensah stood in the general election for the third parliament of the Fourth Republic of Ghana and won the seat of member of parliament for Sunyani East in the Brong-Ahafo Region. He stood on the ticket of the New Patriotic Party, the successor to the Progress Party of the Second Republic. His constituency was among the 14 parliamentary seats out of 21 won by the New Patriotic Party in that election in Brong-Ahafo. The New Patriotic Party won a majority in parliament with 100 seats in total out of 200 in the third parliament. Mensah was elected with 27,756 votes out of 43,128 total valid votes cast. This was equivalent to 65.1% of the total valid votes cast. He was elected over Captain (rtd) F Adu Kwaku Nkrumah of the National Democratic Congress, Shiekh Mustapha Abdulah of the Convention People's Party, Moses Owusu-Yeboah of the People's National Convention, Boachie Amankwa of the United Ghana Movement and Boniface Kojo Mensah of the National Reform Party. These rival candidates won 11,550, 1,269, 1,039, 592 and 427 votes, respectively, out of the total valid votes cast: equivalent to 27.1%, 3.0%, 2.4%, 1.4% and 1.0%, respectively, of the vote.

=== 2004 election ===
Mensah was re-elected as the MP for Sunyani East for the fourth parliament in the 2004 Ghanaian general election. He won 32,035 votes out of 53,972 total valid votes cast (equivalent to 59.40% of total valid votes cast). He was elected over Justice Samuel Adjei of the National Democratic Congress, Cubagee Raphael – an independent candidate, Rev Nana Adjei-Ntow – also an independent candidate, Theophilus Kwame Chartey of the Convention People's Party, Awuah Philip of the Every Ghanaian Living Everywhere Party and A A Boasiako of the Democratic People’s Party. These six candidates obtained 17,860 votes, 1,478 votes, 998 votes, 674 votes, 581 votes and 346 votes, respectively, out of the total valid votes cast: equivalent to 33.10%, 2.70%, 1.80%, 1.20%, 1.10% and 0.60% of all valid votes. Mensah secured his re-election on the ticket of the New Patriotic Party. In the 2004 election, his constituency was one of 14 out of 24 constituencies in the Brong Ahafo region won by the New Patriotic Party or NPP. In all, the NPP won a majority of 128 out of 230 parliamentary seats in the fourth parliament of the Fourth Republic of Ghana.

== Post-1972 coup ==
Beginning in 1974, Mensah worked in the private sector both in Ghana and abroad. He was imprisoned by the National Redemption Council from 1975 to 1978. Although banned from political activity in 1979, he was active for the Popular Front Party in the 1979 elections. He also served as Chairman of the Sunyani District Council in the Brong-Ahafo Region (1979–1981) and was the proprietor of Banka Farms. Exiled in England from 1982 onwards, he led a group opposing the PNDC. He also served on the African Advisory Council of the African Development Bank from 1993 to 1997. In December 1996, Mensah stood as a member of the New Patriotic Party for a parliamentary seat in Sunyani East, which he won. He was re-elected in 2000. Before John Kufuor’s election in 2001, Mensah was the minority leader in Parliament from 1997 to 2001. In addition, he served as Minister and Leader of Government Business from 2001 to 2003; Minister for Public Sector Reform and the National Institutional Renewal Programme from 2003 to 2005, as well as Senior Minister from 2005 to 2006, all under the two Kufuor-led governments.

== Personal life and family ==
He was the older brother of the former first lady Theresa Kufuor.

== Death and state funeral ==
J. H. Mensah died on Thursday 12 July 2018 at the 37 Military Hospital in Accra after a protracted illness, having suffered a stroke a year earlier. He was accorded a state funeral by the Government of Ghana on Friday 17 August 2018 at the Accra International Conference Centre and buried at the new Military Cemetery at Burma Camp.

Political offices
Preceded by Akwasi Afrifa	Minister for Finance^{1} (NLC) ? – ?	Succeeded by ?
Preceded by ?	Minister for Finance; 1969 – 1972	Succeeded by Ignatius Kutu Acheampong
Preceded by ?	Minister and Leader of Government Business; 2001 – 2003	Succeeded by ?
Preceded by Albert Kan Dapaah	Minister for Public Sector Reform and National Institutional Renewal Programme; 2003 – 2005	Succeeded by Paa Kwesi Nduom
New post	Senior Minister; 2005 – 2006	abolished
Parliament of Ghana
Vacant Parliament suspended	Member of Parliament; 1969 – 1972	Vacant Parliament suspended
Preceded by Ato Quarshie	Member of Parliament for Sunyani East; 1997 – 2009	Succeeded by Kwasi Ameyaw-Cherimeh
Notes and references
1. STRUCTURAL ADJUSTMENT PROGRAMS (SAPS) IN GHANA: INTERROGATING PNDC's IMPLEMENTATION ISSN 1525-4488
