= Yvonne Nduom =

Ghanaian public figure

- Born: July 9, 1953 (age 72)
- Education: University of Cape Coast University of Wisconsin
- Known for: The wife of leader of Progressive People's Party
- Awards: Hospitality investment award from Ghana Tourism Authority

Yvonne Nduom (born 9 July 1953) is a Ghanaian public figure, known chiefly as the wife of the leader of the Progressive People's Party. She is currently the Executive Chairperson of Coconut Grove Hotels.

== Education ==
She had her primary and secondary education at the OLA Catholic Girls School in Elmina and Archbishop Porter Girls Secondary School in Takoradi respectively. She also attended the St. Louis Secondary School for her sixth form education. She holds a BA in English and a master's degree in Education Administration and Supervision from the University of Cape Coast and the University of Wisconsin.

== Awards and recognition ==
She received the Life Time Award In Hospitality Investment from the Ghana Tourism Authority in 2012.

== Personal life ==
Yvonne is married to Paa Kwesi Nduom with four children, Nana Kweku Nduom, Edjah Kweku Nduom, Chief Nduom, and Nana Aba Nduom.
