= Nicholas Amankwah =

Ghanaian politician

Hon. Nicholas Amankwah
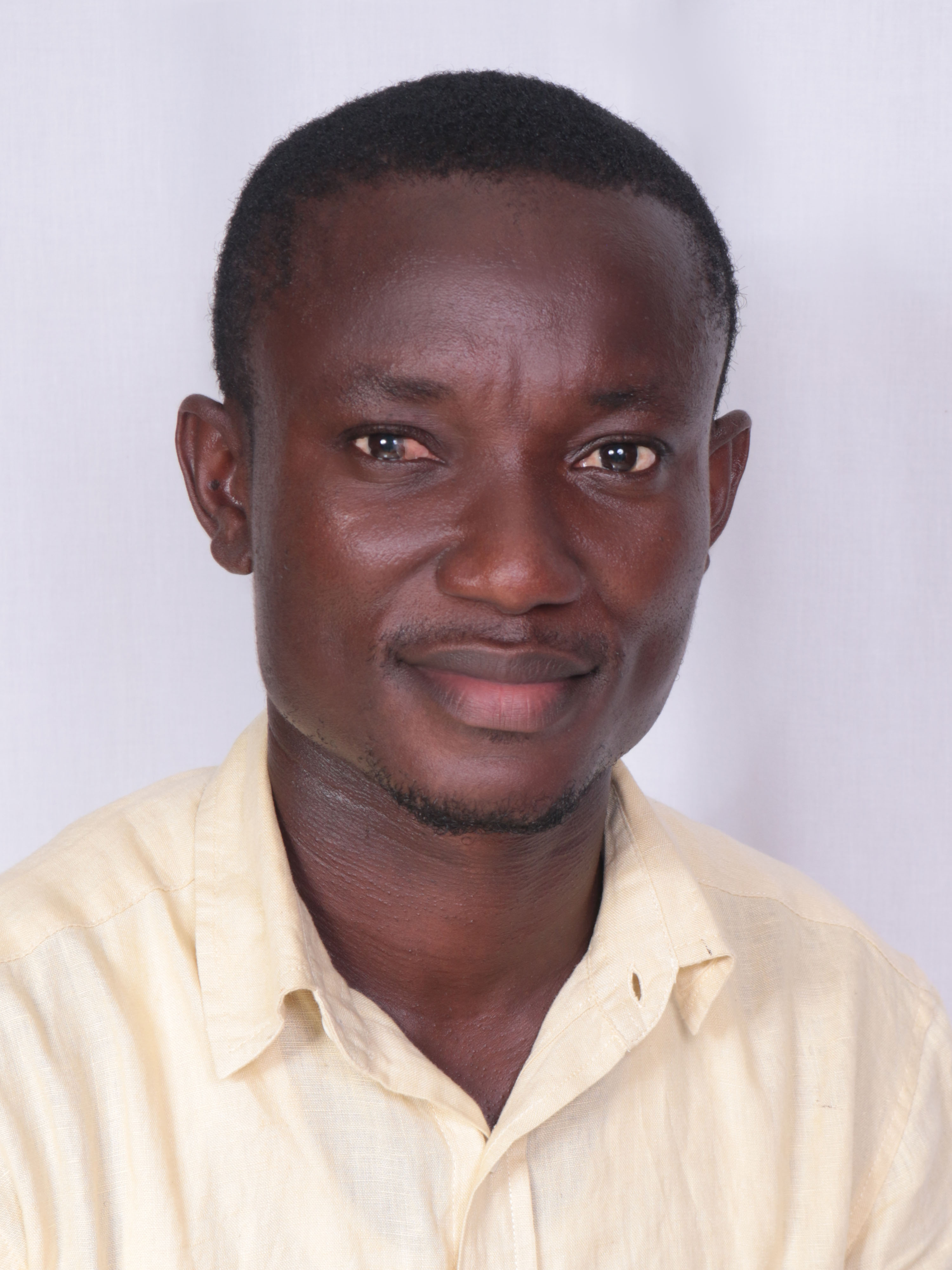

Member of the Ghana Parliament for Amenfi East
- Incumbent
- Assumed office 7 January 2020
- President: Nana Akufo-Addo

Personal details
- Born: 20 May 1984 (age 42)
- Party: National Democratic Congress (Ghana)
- Committees: Employment, Social Welfare and State Enterprises Committee

Nicholas Amankwah is a Ghanaian politician who is a member of the National Democratic Congress. He is the member of Parliament for the Amenfi East Constituency in the Western region.

== Career ==
Amankwah served as District Chief Executive (DCE) for the Wassa Amenfi East District Assembly now Wassa Amenfi East Municipal Assembly from 2016 to 2017.

== Politics ==
=== Member of parliament ===
Amankwah entered the race for the parliamentary candidate in the National Democratic Congress primaries in the Amenfi East Constituency ahead of the 2020 elections. He was acclaimed in August 2019 after he went opposed in the National Democratic Congress primaries making him the NDC's candidate for the Amenfi East constituency.

In December 2020, Ghansah won the seat for Amenfi East Constituency in the parliamentary elections after polling 36,215 votes representing 53.90% against his closest contender, Edward Amo-Acquah of the New Patriotic Party who had 29,954 votes representing 44.58%

Prior to the elections, on 4 November 2020 it was reported on both radio and television that he had been attacked by armed robbers at his residence at Wassa Akropong.

== Personal life ==
Nicholas Amankwah is a Christian.
