= Afigya Sekyere West =

Ghana parliament constituency

- constituency for the Parliament of Ghana
- District: Afigya-Sekyere District
- Region: Ashanti Region of Ghana

Current constituency
- Party: New Patriotic Party
- MP: Albert Kan-Dapaah

Afigya Sekyere West is one of the constituencies represented in the Parliament of Ghana. It elects one Member of Parliament (MP) by the first past the post system of election. Afigya Sekyere West is located in the Afigya-Sekyere district of the Ashanti Region of Ghana. The constituency became defunct after the electoral commission rezoned and merged some constituencies ahead of the 2012 parliamentary elections.

== Boundaries ==
The seat is located within the Afigya-Sekyere District of the Ashanti Region of Ghana.

== Members of Parliament ==
Election	Member	Party
1992	Mrs. Beatrice Aboagye	National Democratic Congress
1996	Albert Kan-Dapaah	New Patriotic Party
2000	Albert Kan-Dapaah	New Patriotic Party
2004	Albert Kan-Dapaah	New Patriotic Party
2008	Albert Kan-Dapaah	New Patriotic Party

== Elections ==
2008 Ghanaian parliamentary election: Afigya Sekyere West Source: Ghana Home Page
Party	Candidate	Votes	%	±%
New Patriotic Party	Albert Kan Dapaah	33,080	76.3	
National Democratic Congress	Joseph Baah	9,401	21.7	
Convention People's Party	James Gyimah Dabo	640	1.5	
People's National Convention	Joyce Oduro	257	0.6	
Majority		23,679	54.5	

== See also ==
- List of Ghana Parliament constituencies
