= Paa Kwesi Nduom =

Ghanaian politician, business consultant and Member of Parliament

Hon. Paa Kwesi Nduom MP
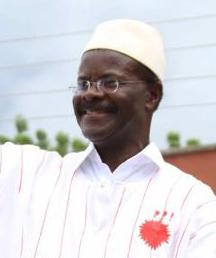
- Papa Kwesi Nduom on a campaign trail

Member of Parliament for Komenda-Edina-Eguafo-Abirem
- In office January 2005 – January 2009
- Preceded by: Ato Quarshie
- Succeeded by: Joseph Samuel Annan
- Majority: 15,554

Personal details
- Born: Joseph Hubster Yorke Jr. 15 February 1953 (age 73) Elmina, Ghana
- Party: Progressive People's Party
- Other political affiliations: Convention People's Party (until Jan 2012)
- Spouse: Mrs. Yvonne Nduom
- Children: Nana Kweku, Edjah, Chief and Nana Aba
- Education: University of Wisconsin
- Profession: Business consultant and politician
- Website: http://www.nduom.com/

Paa Kwesi Nduom or Papa Kwesi Nduom, (born February 15, 1953) is a Ghanaian business consultant, politician, and founder of Ghana's Progressive People's Party. A three-time candidate for president, he was the member of parliament for the Komenda-Edina-Eguafo-Abirem constituency and served as minister of state in the Kufuor government.

== Early life and education ==
Paa Kwesi Nduom was born in Elmina in the Central Region of Ghana. He was named Joseph Hubster Yorke Jr after his father. He had his secondary education at the St. Augustine's College in Cape Coast, where he obtained both the General Certificate of Education (GCE) Ordinary and Advanced Levels ("O" level and "A" levels). He proceeded to the United States, where he obtained a Bachelor of Arts (economics) degree at the University of Wisconsin–Milwaukee in 1975. He subsequently went on to pursue a master's degree in management (1977) and a Ph.D. (service delivery systems) in 1982 at the same university.

== Career ==
Nduom started work as a life insurance underwriter with the North Western Mutual Life Insurance Company between 1975 and 1978. Over the next year, he worked with Blue Cross Blue Shield of Wisconsin. In 1979, he joined the Milwaukee Metropolitan Sewerage District as a budget and management analyst. In 1981, he joined Deloitte and Touche as an associate consultant, rising to become a partner in the firms' Milwaukee office by 1986. In 1992, he helped establish Deloitte & Touche's West Africa Consulting division.

He served as a board member for Fan Milk Ghana Limited, Edinaman Secondary School and the Ghana Heritage and Conservation Trust.

He shares ownership of GN Savings and Loans with other shareholders. He is also the owner of Groupe Ndoum and Coconut Grove Resort in Ghana.

He owns a lot of businesses in Ghana and he is also the founder of the Nduom School of Business.

== Politics ==
District Assembly

His active role in politics began in 1997 when he was elected as a member of the Komenda-Edina-Eguafo-Abirem District Assembly for the Akotobinsin Electoral Area.

National Politics

In December 2000, he contested the Ghanaian parliamentary elections for the Komenda-Edina-Eguafo-Abirem constituency on the ticket of the Convention's People's Party (CPP). However, he lost to the incumbent MP, Ato Quarshie of the National Democratic Congress (NDC) by a margin of 2.6% of the valid votes cast. However, two months later, he was appointed by President John Kufuor in January 2001 as the Minister for Economic Planning and Regional Corporation although he was not a member of the ruling New Patriotic Party. He also served during this period as the Chairman of the National Development Planning Commission. During a cabinet reshuffle in April 2003, Nduom became the Minister for Energy. Eighteen months later, he again contested the Komenda-Edina-Eguafo-Abirem seat in the Ghanaian parliamentary election in December 2004 and this time, he won by 33.6 points (30,981 votes to 15,427). At the time, he served as the chairman of the Organising Committee of the CPP. Early in President Kufuor's second term of office, Nduom became the Minister for Public Sector Reform. He continued in this capacity till July 2007 when he resigned from government to seek his party's nomination to stand as the CPP presidential candidate.

Bid for President

₵

== GN Bank ==
Ndoum is the founder of GN Bank. The bank was first incorporated as First National Savings and Loans in May 2008. By September same year, it was issued a universal banking license by the Bank of Ghana. The Bank overtook the Ghana Commercial Bank as the bank with the most network across the country. In January 2019, the central Bank granted GN Bank's request to reclassify as a savings and loans company as it was unable to meet the minimum paid up capital of ¢400 million by December 2018.

In August 2019, GN Bank reclassified as Savings and Loans Company was among 23 Saving and Loans Outfits whose licenses were withdrawn by the Bank of Ghana. In a statement, the Central Bank said GN had become insolvent under section 123 (4) of the Banks and SDIs Act, 2016 (Act 930), being in breach of its key prudential regulatory requirements.

Among other reasons, BOG said GN was facing severe liquidity crisis with complaints received by the Financial Stability Department of the Central Bank from customers who have been denied access to their deposits for months. Also, GN consistently failed to meet the minimum cash reserve requirement of 10 percent of its total deposits by the first quarter of 2019. Again, shareholders of GN, according to the Bank of Ghana, failed to restore the company to the required regulatory capital and liquidity levels despite promises that new capital was expected from foreign investors. GN was also found to have diverted some ₵761.55 million to pay the customers of two subsidiaries, Gold Coast Fund Management Limited and Ghana Growth Fund.

Despite the reasons given, Ndoum denied all the reasons and proceeded on August 19, 2019, to file a suit at the high court challenging the decision of the BOG to revoke its license as savings and loans company. In the court, lawyers of Ndoum argued that withdrawing GN's license was abuse of regulatory authority of the central bank and affront to the human rights of Ndoum, the owner.

In January 2024, the human right division of the Accra High Court dismissed Ndoum's application for the violation of fundamental human rights. Delivering the judgment, the court said BOG withdrew GN's license legally as it had become apparent that at the time the central bank took the action, GN was not able to meet its debt obligation as a result of bad governance. Lawyers for Ndoum after the court's verdict indicated their disagreement and said they were going to appeal the judgment.

== Family ==
Nduom is married to Yvonne Nduom, a management specialist and graduate of the University of Cape Coast and the University of Wisconsin in the United States. They have four children namely, Nana Kweku Nduom, Edjah Kweku Nduom, Chief Nduom, and Nana Aba Nduom. Nana Kweku is married to Esinam Julia Nduom (née Baeta) and they have a daughter, Maame Adjoa Kakraba Nduom. Edjah is married to Kelley Nduom (née Coleman).

== Awards and recognitions ==
- Best Ghanaian Business Personality in the year 2015.

== See also ==
- Kufuor government

Political offices
Preceded by Kwamena Ahwoi	Minister for Economic Planning & Regional Cooperation; 2001^{1} – 2003	Succeeded by Kofi Konadu Apraku
Preceded by Albert Kan Dapaah	Minister for Energy; 2003^{2} – 2005	Succeeded by Mike Oquaye
Preceded by Joseph Henry Mensah	Minister for Public Sector Reform; 2005^{3} – 2007^{4}	Succeeded by Samuel Owusu-Agyei
Parliament of Ghana
Preceded by Ato Quarshie	Komenda-Edina-Eguafo-Abirem constituency 2005^{5} – 2009	Succeeded by Joseph Samuel Annan
Party political offices
Preceded by George Aggudey	Convention People's Party Presidential Candidate; 2008^{6}	Succeeded by Michael Abu Sakara Foster
New title	Progressive People's Party Presidential Candidate; 2012	Incumbent
Notes and references
1. Nduom is out - Statesman Online; 2. Government names new Cabinet - Ghanaweb.com; 3. Kufuor restructures ministerial team - Ghanaweb.com; 4. Nduom quits government - Ghanaweb.com; 5. Parliamentary Results Komenda/Edina Eguafo/Abirem (Central Region) - Ghanaweb.com; 6. Nduom wins CPP race - Ghanaweb.com
