= Anthony Evans Amoah =

Ghanaian Politician (1952–2024)

- Preceded by: Samuel Kwame Amponsah
- Succeeded by: Issac Adjei Mensah

MP for Wassa East
- In office 7 January 2005 – 6 January 2013

Personal details
- Born: 8 April 1952 (age 74)
- Died: 2nd November 2024
- Party: New Patriotic Party
- Education: University of Ghana
- Occupation: Politician
- Profession: Journalist

Anthony Evans Amoah was a Ghanaian politician and journalist who represented Wassa East Constituency in the Fifth Parliament of the Fourth Republic of Ghana after being proclaimed the winner of the 2008 Ghanaian general elections.

== Early life and education ==
Amoah was given birth to on 8 April 1952. He is an indigene of Mpohor a town in the Western Region of Ghana. He obtained his Master of Philosophy in Sociology in 1995 and Master of Business Administration in 2000 from the University of Ghana.

== Career ==
Amoah worked as a Journalist and Advertiser before going into parliament. He also worked as the Human Resource Manager of the Graphic Communications Group Limited,

== Politics ==
=== 2004 Elections ===
Amoah was first elected as a member of Parliament in the 2004 Ghanaian General Elections. He was elected as the member of parliament of the Mpohor Wassa East constituency in the Western region of Ghana. He thus represented the constituency in the 4th parliament of the 4th republic of Ghana. He was elected with 19,635votes out of 40,736 total valid votes cast. This was equivalent to 48.2% of the total valid votes cast. He was elected over David Ansah of the People's National Convention, Joseph Kobina Danyame of the National Democratic Congress and Mary Ankomah of the Convention People's Party. These obtained 1%, 24.6% and 26.2% respectively of the total valid votes cast. Amoah was elected on the ticket of the New Patriotic Party.

He is a member of the New Patriotic Party. He served as the Western Regional Minister under the government of John Kufuor until 2008 before he contested for the member of parliament to represent the Wassa East Constituency in the Western region. During the 2008 Ghanaian general elections, he won his parliamentary seat with 16,014 vote cast out of 37,936 valid votes He represented for only one term in office.

== Personal life ==
Amoah was married with five children. He was a Christian and a member of the Pentecost Church.

== Death ==
Hon. Amoah died on 2 November 2024 after a brief illness.
