= Joseph Aidoo (politician) =

Ghanaian politician, MP (born 1963)

Hon. Joseph Boahen Aidoo
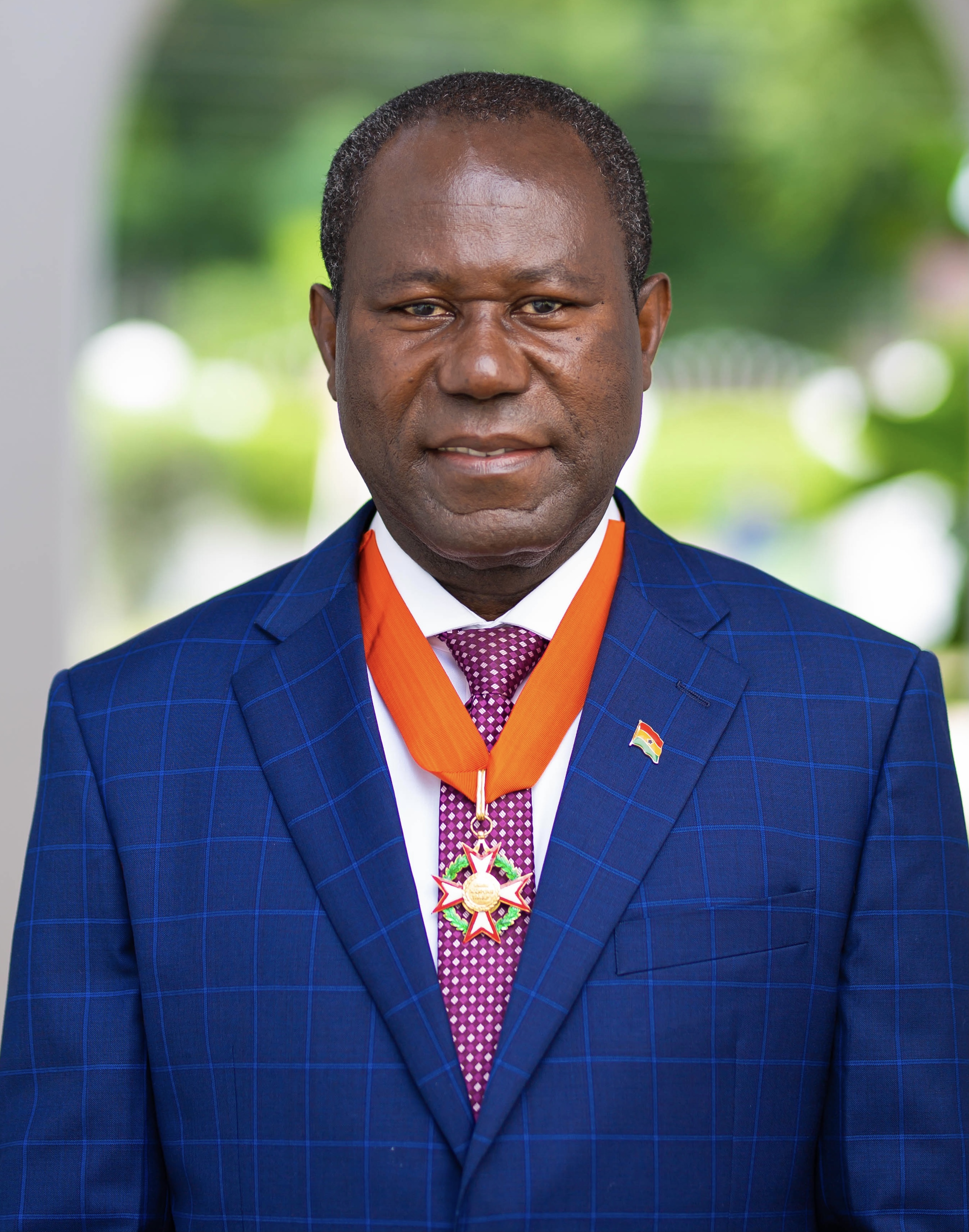

Former Western Regional Minister
- Incumbent
- Assumed office 7 January 2001
- Preceded by: George Buadi
- Succeeded by: Akwasi Oppong Fosu

MP for Amenfi East
- In office 7 January 2001 – 6 January 2013

Personal details
- Born: 13 December 1957 (age 68) Wassa Afransie
- Party: New Patriotic Party
- Children: 5
- Education: University of Ghana
- Occupation: Politician
- Profession: Lecturer And Research Fellow
- Committees: Chairman For Lands And Forestry Committee

Joseph Boahen Aidoo (born 13 December 1957) is a Ghanaian politician who served as a Member of Parliament for the Amenfi East constituency in the Western Region.

== Early life and education ==
He was born on 13 December 1957 in Wassa Afransie in the Wassa Amenfi East District in the Western region of Ghana. He holds a degree in Geography specialising in Resource Development from the University of Ghana and an MPhil degree in Geography also from University of Ghana. He has a certificate in Land Reform, Agricultural and Rural Development from the Land Reform Institute LRTI Taoyuang, Taiwan.

== Career ==
He is a Research fellow and a lecturer. He was a lecturer at the Kwame Nkrumah University of Science and Technology and a research fellow. He was a researcher with the Institute of Land Management and Development ILMAD and did extensive work on land and cocoa. He has been the principal country researcher for a number of International Organisations such as the United Nations' Food And Agricultural Organisation FAO and the International Food Policy Research Institute (IFPRI), Washington, as well as HR Wallingford. He has a number of publications to his name.Key amongst them are K.Otsuka, J.B Aidoo et al. "Land Tenure and the Management of the Land Trees, the case of Customary Land Tenure Areas of Ghana". A Quisumbing, J.B Aidoo et al. 2001; "Evolution of Land Customary Land Tenure Agroforestry in Ghana". A. R. Quisumbing, J.B AIDOO et al. 1998 "Women's land Rights in the Transition to Individualised Ownership". K. Otsuka, J.B Aidoo et al. 1998 "Causes and consequences of Changing Land Tenure Institutions in Western Ghana". Cornish, G. and Aidoo, J. and Ayamby, I. (2001) Informal irrigation in the peri-urban zone of Kumasi, Ghana - an analysis of farmer activity and productivity. Project Report. HR Wallingford Ltd. Cornish, G. and Aidoo, J. (2000) Informal irrigation in the peri-urban zone of Kumasi, Ghana: findings from an initial questionnaire survey. Project Report. HR Wallingford Ltd. He was appointed as the Western Regional Minister from 2001 to 2006 by the then President John Agyekum Kuffour. He was also the Member of Parliament for Amenfi East Constituency from 2001 to 2012 on the ticket of the NPP New Patriotic Party. In 2020, he worked as the chief executive officer of the Ghana Cocoa Board. He was also the former Western Regional Minister. He was presented with Best Construction Industry CEO of SIGA Award for the year 2020-2021

== Politics ==
He is a member of New Patriotic Party. He was the member of parliament for Amenfi East constituency in the Western region of Ghana for the 5th parliament of the 4th republic of Ghana. He was elected with 18,576 votes out of 35,832total valid voted cast on the ticket of the New Patriotic Party. He was elected over Akwasi Opong Fosu of the National Democratic Congress and Samuel Yaw Obeng-Damoah of the Convention People's Party. These obtained 45.33% and 2.83% respectively of total valid votes cast. He was appointed as Minister of State for the Western Region.

In the year 2000, Joseph Boahen Aidoo was elected as the member of parliament for the Amenfi East constituency of the Western Region of Ghana in the 2000 Ghanaian general elections. He won on the ticket of the New Patriotic Party. His constituency was a part of the 9 parliamentary seats out of 19 seats won by the New Patriotic Party in that election for the Western Region.

He won 14,578 votes out of the total valid votes cast. This is equivalent to 55.90% of total valid votes cast. He was elected over George Buadi of the National Democratic Congress and Gabriel Yaw Amoo-Gyedu of the Convention People's Party. These obtained 10,802 and 694 votes respectively of the total votes cast. These are equivalent to 41.40% and 2.70% respectively.

== Personal life ==
He is married with five children. He is a Catholic Christian.
