= Shani Alhassan Saibu =

Ghanaian politician

Shani Alhassan Saibu is a Ghanaian politician and was the northern regional minister of Ghana during the second term of Ghana's former president Nana Akufo Addo.
