= Courage Quashigah =

Ghanaian soldier and politician

Major Courage Quashigah

Minister for Health
- In office January 2005 – January 2009
- President: John Kufuor
- Preceded by: Dr. Kwaku Afriyie
- Succeeded by: Dr. George Sipa-Adjah Yankey

Minister for Agriculture
- In office January 2001 – January 2005
- President: John Kufuor
- Preceded by: Ibrahim Issaka Adam
- Succeeded by: Ernest Akubuor Debrah

Personal details
- Born: 9 September 1947 Kedzi, Ghana
- Died: 5 January 2010 (aged 62) Israel
- Party: New Patriotic Party
- Occupation: Politician
- Profession: Army officer
- Committees: Member of Police Council
- Awards: Order of the Star of Volta

Military service
- Allegiance: Ghana
- Branch/service: Ghana army
- Years of service: 1972 - 1992
- Rank: Major

Major Courage Emmanuel Kobla Quashigah (9 September 1947 – 5 January 2010) was a Ghanaian soldier and politician. He held many prominent positions in the Ghana Armed Forces and was a Minister of State for Agriculture and later Health in the NPP government of John Kufuor between 2001 and 2009. His daughter is British actress Rosalind Eleazar.

== Early life and education ==
Quashigah was born at Kedzi in the Volta Region of Ghana. He had his secondary and sixth form education at the Keta Secondary School also in the Volta Region. He gained his GCE Ordinary Level and GCE Advanced Level certificates there. He proceeded to the United Kingdom where he studied at the Royal Military Academy at Sandhurst. He qualified with a Diploma in Economics, War studies and Communication studies. He was awarded the Cane and Certificate of Honour as Best Overseas Cadet and Highest in the Order of Merit at Sandhurst.

== Military career ==
Quashigah served as an Intelligence officer at the headquarters of the Second Infantry Brigade of the Ghana Army based at Kumasi in the Ashanti Region of Ghana. He was a Platoon Commander/Instructor at Junior Leaders Company, a.k.a. Boys Company in Kumasi. He then became the Chief Instructor at the Jungle Warfare School at Akyease, in the Eastern Region. Other positions later held by him include Commanding Officer of the Ghana Military Police and Commanding Officer of the Forces Reserve Battalion. He has also served as a Director at the Military Academy and Training School at Teshie, a suburb of Accra. Quashigah distinguished himself in various fields in the army. After serving with the United Nations Interim Force in Lebanon, he won a Commendation for Efficient and Effective Command.

== Politics ==
During the military rule of the Provisional National Defence Council (PNDC), he was the Chief Operations Officer at the (PNDC) Headquarters, Gonjar Barracks, Burma Camp, Accra. He also served as a Member of the Police Council of Ghana. Quashigah was formerly a close ally of Jerry Rawlings, Head of state of Ghana and chairman of the PNDC. On September 24, 1989, Quashigah and four others were arrested for allegedly plotting to overthrow the PNDC government. He was finally released in 1992. In 1998, he became the national organiser of the New Patriotic Party (NPP). After the NPP formed a government in January 2001, Quashigah was appointed Minister of Agriculture. He was appointed Health Minister after a cabinet reshuffle in 2005 after President Kufuor was re-elected in the December 2004 presidential election. Whilst serving as minister of Health, Quashigah received notable recognition for outstanding contribution towards initiating a national health education on healthy lifestyle living and nutrition in Ghana. His efforts was successful as the Africa Union adopted and called on member states to declare the last Friday of each year as Africa's Healthy Lifestyles Day. Quashigah was named best health Minister in Africa by the Country Awards Council Ghana.

== Personal life ==
He was married to Gertrude Quashigah, the CEO of Ambar Quality Foods Limited and the National Coordinator of the School Feeding Program.

== Death and burial ==
Quashigah traveled to Israel during a short illness for some public engagements and to seek medical attention but died during his trip. His body was repatriated to Ghana. He was buried at the family cemetery at Kedzi near Keta on 20 March 2010.

== External sources ==
- Profile on Ghanaweb.com
- Quashigah's death on Ghanaweb.com

Political offices
Preceded by Dr. Kwaku Afriyie	Minister for Health; 2005–2009	Succeeded by Dr. George Sipa-Adjah Yankey
Preceded by Ibrahim Issaka Adam	Minister for Agriculture; 2001–2005	Succeeded by Ernest Debrah
