= Mustapha Ali Iddris =

Ghanaian politician

MP for Tamale North
- In office 7 January 2001 – 6 January 2005
- President: John Agyekum Kufour

MP for Tamale North
- In office 7 January 1997 – 6 January 2001
- President: Jerry John Rawlings

Personal details
- Born: 28 April 1955 Gukpegu-Sagongida, Northern Region Gold Coast (now Ghana)
- Died: 2 June 2013 (aged 58)
- Party: New Patriotic Party
- Occupation: Politician
- Profession: Minister

Mustapha Ali Iddris (28 April 1955 – 2 June 2013) was a Ghanaian politician who served as a member of the Third Parliament of the Fourth Republic, representing the Gukpegu-Sagongida constituency in the Northern Region of Ghana.

== Early life and education ==
Ali was born in April 1955 in Gukpegu-Sagongida in the Northern Region of Ghana.

== Politics ==
Ali was elected into Parliament on the Ticket of the New Patriotic Party during the December 2000 Ghanaian General Elections representing the Gukpegu-Sagongida Constituency in the Northern Region of Ghana. He polled 24,819 votes out of the 54,491 valid votes cast representing 45.50%. He served only one term as a Parliamentarian. His constituency was a part of the parliamentary 16 seats out of 21 seats won by the New Patriotic Party in that election for the Northern Region. The New Patriotic Party won a majority total of 99 parliamentary seats out of 200 seats. He was elected over Abdul-Nahiru Essahaku of the National Democratic Congress, Iddirisu H.Ayuba of the Convention People's Party, Wahab Ali of the National Reform Party, Mumuni Fatawu of the United Ghana Movement. These won 22,255, 6,764, 463, 190 and 0 votes out of the total valid votes cast respectively. These were equivalent to 40.80%,12.40%,0.80%, 0.30% and 0.00% respectively of total valid votes cast.

Prior to his victory in 2000, Ali also represented his constituency in the 2nd parliament of the 4th republic of Ghana. He defeated Basit Aboulai Fuseini of the National Democratic Congress and Iddrisu H. Ayub of the Convention People's Party having obtained 42.40% of the total valid votes cast which is equivalent to 31,964 votes while his oppositions both obtained 32.00% and 0.80% of the total valid votes cast respectively at the 1996 Ghanaian General Elections.

== Career ==
Ali was the Former Northern Regional Minister and also the Former Minister of Water Resources, Works and Housing. he was also the Former Member of Parliament for the Gukpegu-Sagongida Constituency in the Northern Region of Ghana.

== Death ==
Ali died in June 2013 at the 37 Military Hospital in Accra, where he had gone for medical attention. His remains were laid to rest the following day at the Tamale Cemetery.

== Personal life ==
Ali was married with 2 children. He belonged to the Islamic Religion (Muslim).
