= Alex Kyeremeh =

Ghanaian politician

Hon. Alex Kyeremeh

Member of the Ghana Parliament for Techiman North
- In office 7 January 2013 – 6 January 2017
- President: John Mahama
- Preceded by: Christopher Ameyaw-Akumfi
- Succeeded by: Martin Oti Gyarko

Member of Parliament for Techiman North Constituency
- In office 7 January 2005 – 6 January 2009
- President: John Kufuor
- Preceded by: Isaac Kwadwo Adjei Mensah
- Succeeded by: Christopher Ameyaw-Akumfi

Personal details
- Born: 7 September 1962 (age 64)
- Party: National Democratic Congress
- Education: Ghana Institute of Mnanagement and Public Administration
- Profession: Accountant

Alex Kyeremeh is a Member of Parliament for Techiman North in the Brong Ahafo region of Ghana.

== Early life and education ==
He was born on 7 September 1962. He hails from Krobo-Techiman in Brong Ahafo region.

In 2002, he attended Ghana Institute of Management and Public Administration where he did his Bachelor of Science in Accounting and Finance. In 2015, he obtained a Certificate in Management also from the Ghana Institute of Management and Administration.

== Career ==
Kyeremeh was the managing director of Freda and Rose Limited. He has worked as the Municipal Chief Executive of Techiman Municipality Assembly from April 2009- January 2013. Kyeremeh is an Accountant and Financial Officer by profession.

== Politics ==
Kyeremeh is a member of the National Democratic Congress. He was first elected as the member of parliament for the Techiman North constituency in the 2004 Ghanaian general elections. He thus represented the constituency in the 4th parliament of the 4th republic of Ghana. He was elected with 12,877 votes out of 24,731 total valid votes cast. This was equivalent to 52.1% of the total valid votes cast. He was elected over Christopher Ameyaw Akumfi of the New Patriotic Party and Kofi Kwaw Sarpong an independent candidate. These obtained 11,447votes and 407votes respectively of the total valid votes cast. This was equivalent to 46.3% and 1.6% respectively of total valid votes cast. Kyeremeh was elected on the ticket of the National Democratic Congress. His constituency formed part of the 10 parliamentary seats out of 24 seats won by the National Democratic Congress in the Brong Ahafo Region for that election. In all, the National Democratic Congress won a minority total of 94 parliamentary representation out of a total 230seats in the 4th parliament of the 4th republic of Ghana.

Kyeremeh was re-elected as the member of parliament for the Techiman North constituency in the 2012 Ghanaian general elections. He thus represented the constituency in the 6th parliament of the 4th republic of Ghana. He was elected with 16,537 votes out of 30,876 total valid votes cast. This was equivalent to 53.56% of total valid votes cast. He was elected over the incumbent member of parliament, Christopher Ameyaw Akumfi if the New Patriotic Party, Kwakye Kofi of the Progressive People's Party, Agartha Ampomaa of the Convention People's Party and Agyemang Badu Opambour of the National Democratic Party. These obtained 13,727votes, 155votes, 337votes and 120 votes respectively of the total valid votes cast. These were equivalent to 44.46%, 0.5%, 1.09% and 0.39% of total valid votes cast. Kyeremeh was re-elected on the ticket of the National Democratic Congress. His constituency was a part of 16parliamentary seats out of total of 29 seats won by the National Democratic Congress in the Brong Ahafo region of Ghana.

== Personal life ==
Alex is married. He is a Christian (Catholic).
