= Hackman Owusu-Agyeman =

Ghanaian politician (born 1941)

Hon. Hackman Owusu-Agyemang
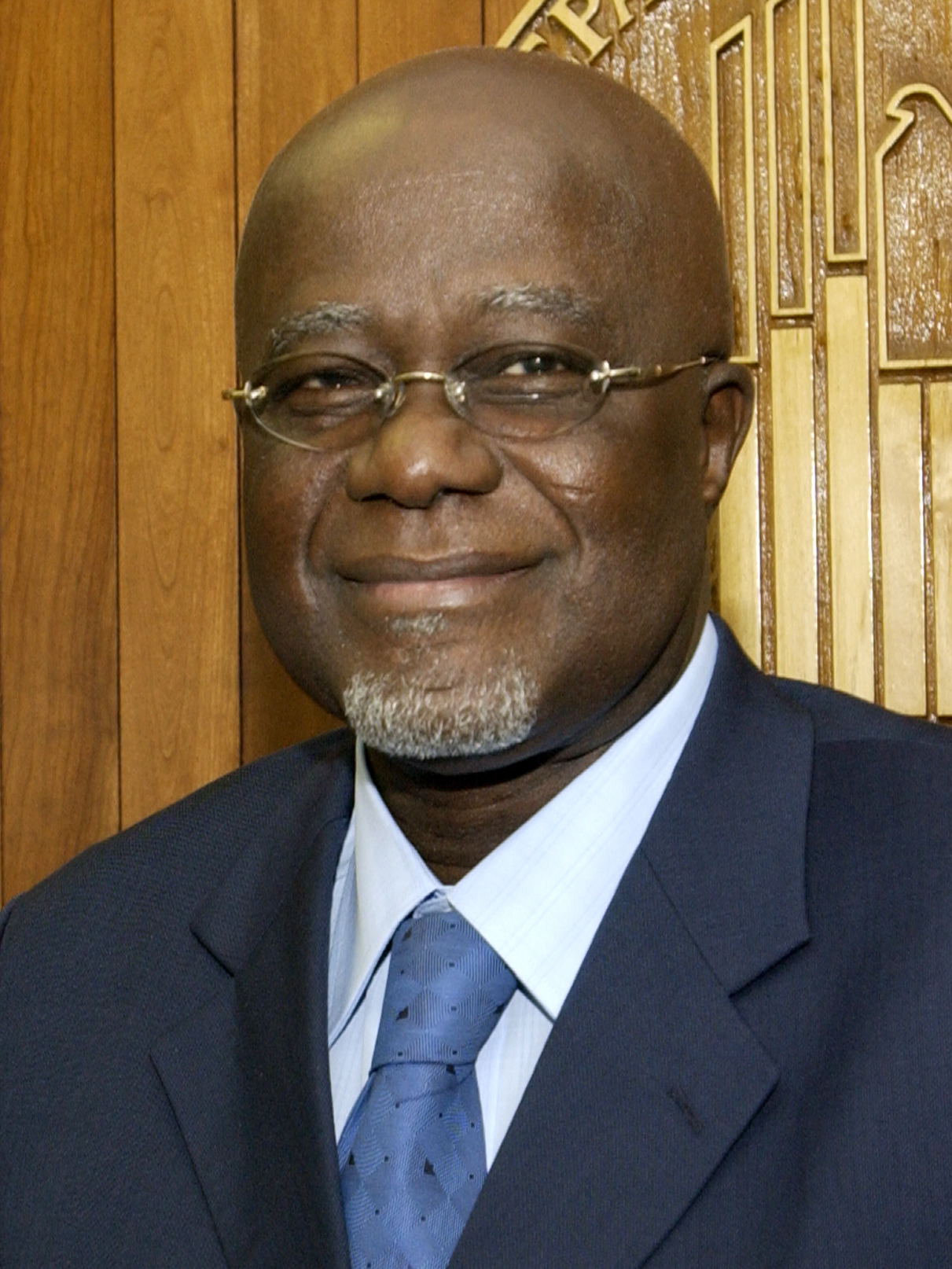

Member of the Ghana Parliament for New Juaben North
- In office 7 January 1997 – 6 January 2017
- Preceded by: Samuel Nuamah Donkor
- Succeeded by: Kwasi Boateng Adjei

Minister of Foreign Affairs
- In office 2 February 2001 – 1 April 2003
- President: John Kufuor
- Preceded by: James Victor Gbeho
- Succeeded by: Nana Akufo-Addo

Minister for Interior
- In office 1 April 2003 – 2 February 2005
- President: John Kufuor
- Preceded by: Malik Al-Hassan Yakubu
- Succeeded by: Papa Owusu-Ankomah

Minister for Water Resources, Works and Housing
- In office 2005–2007
- Preceded by: John Kufuor
- Succeeded by: Abubakar Boniface Siddique

Personal details
- Born: 22 November 1941 (age 84) Koforidua, Ghana
- Party: New Patriotic Party
- Education: Kwame Nkrumah University of Science and Technology
- Occupation: Agricultural Economist

Hackman Owusu-Agyemang (born 22 November 1941) is a Ghanaian politician and former member of Parliament for New Juaben North constituency of the eastern region of Ghana. He is a member of the 3rd parliament of the 4th republic of Ghana and a former Minister of Water, Works and Housing as well as a former minister of foreign affairs. He is currently the Chairman of the Council of Elders of the New Patriotic Party and board chairman of the Ghana Cocoa Board.

== Early life and education ==
Hackman Owusu-Agyemang was born on 22 November 1941 at Effiduase- Koforidua in the Eastern Region of Ghana. He attained senior high school education at St. Augustine's College (Cape Coast). Between 1961 and 1965, he proceeded to the Kwame Nkrumah University of Science and Technology, where he obtained a Bachelor of Science degree in Agriculture. He then studied at the Institute of Social Studies, The Hague, Netherlands, where he obtained a Post Graduate Certificate in Agricultural Planning. He then went further to Wye College at the University of London in the United Kingdom, where he attained a Master's degree in Agriculture in 1969.

== Career ==
Agyemang is an agriculturalist. In 1965, he started work as an Agricultural Economist at the Ghana Ministry of Agriculture. In 1970, he moved to the Food and Agriculture Organization (FAO) in Rome, Italy. He worked in various capacities as Economist at the Economic Analysis Division, Field Programme Officer and then as FAO-Regional Co- operation, and Liaison Officer responsible for Africa. After 1979, he became the FAO representative in Zambia and then Trinidad and Tobago. He became Chief Regional Bureau for Africa in 1984.

== Politics ==
Owusu-Agyemang is a politician of the new patriotic party and became the Member of Parliament for the New Juabeng North constituency after contesting in the 1996 Ghanaian parliamentary elections which he won with 11,629 making 52.60% of the total valid votes cast. He held on to the seat in the 2000 Ghanaian general elections by winning 73% equivalent to 4,499 of the total valid votes cast. He maintained his seat again in the 2004 Ghanaian general elections with 71.30% of the total votes cast. After the NPP won the December 2000 elections, he was appointed the Foreign Minister from January 2001 to April 2003. He then became the Minister for Interior for two years. From 2005 until 2007, he was the Minister for Water Resources, Works and Housing in the Kufuor government. In 2017, President Nana Akufo-Addo appointed him as Chairman of the Ghana Cocoa Board.

== Elections ==
Hackman has won the seat of the member of parliament for the New Juabeng North constituency for three consecutive times. In the 2000 Ghanaian general elections, he was chosen over Samuel Mcneil Nimo of the National Democratic Congress. Other opponents included Joseph Obeng of the National Reform Party, Samuel Effah Krofah of the People's National Convention and Yaw Oti-Dankese of the Convention People's Party. He polled 14,499 votes of the total valid votes cast. This is equivalent to 73.00%. Mr. Nimo had 4,286, Joseph had 621, Effah Krofah had 272 and Oti-Dankese had 178. These votes are equal to 21.60%, 3.10%,1.40% and 0.90% respectively.

== Awards and recognition ==
2020 Ghana Cocoa Awards: Excellence in Leadership in terms of Translational Policies.

== Personal life ==
Hackman's wife, Comfort Owusu-Agyemang, died on Thursday, 25 August 2022.

== Sources ==
- Ghanaweb

Parliament of Ghana
Preceded by ?	Member of Parliament for New Juabeng North; 1997 – present	Incumbent
Political offices
Preceded by James Victor Gbeho	Foreign Minister; 2001 – 2003	Succeeded by Nana Addo Dankwa Akufo-Addo
Preceded by Malik Al-Hassan Yakubu	Minister for Interior Affairs; 2003 – 2005	Succeeded by Papa Owusu Ankomah
Preceded by Alhaji Mustapha Idris Ali (Minister for Works and Housing)	Minister for Water Resources, Works and Housing; 2005 – 2007	Succeeded by Boniface Abubakar Saddique
