= Kwamena Bartels =

Ghanaian politician (born 1947)

Member of the Ghana Parliament for Ablekuma North
- In office Jan 1997 – Jan 2009
- Preceded by: Adam Baako Nortey Yeboah
- Succeeded by: Justice Joe Appiah

Minister of the Interior
- In office 2007–2008
- President: John Kufuor
- Preceded by: Albert Kan Dapaah
- Succeeded by: Kwame Addo-Kufuor

Minister for Information and National Orientation
- In office 2006–2007
- President: John Kufuor
- Preceded by: Daniel Kwaku Botwe
- Succeeded by: Florence Oboshie Sai-Coffie

Minister in charge of Private Sector Development and President's Special Initiative
- In office 2005–2006
- President: John Kufuor
- Preceded by: office created
- Succeeded by: ministry merged with Trade and Industry

Personal details
- Born: Kwamena Bartels; 27 October 1947 (age 79) Agona Swedru, Ghana
- Spouse: Married
- Occupation: Politician

Peter Kwamena Essilfie Bartels (born 27 October 1947) is a Ghanaian politician and former government minister of the New Patriotic Party.

== Biography ==
After graduating from Mfantsipim School in 1968, Bartels was admitted to the University of Ghana, where he studied law. After obtaining his bachelor's degree in 1971, Bartels continued his studies at the Ghana School of Law in order to become a professional lawyer.

In 1979, Bartels first contested for a seat in the Parliament of Ghana, but was defeated by a People's National Party candidate. In 1992, Bartels again stood for election in Agona West constituency, but withdrew after his party boycotted the 1992 election due to alleged electoral fraud. In 1996, Bartels was elected MP for the Ablekuma North constituency. He was the Minister for Works and Housing from 2001 -2004. He subsequently became Minister in charge of Private Sector and PSI (2005-2006), Minister of Information & National Orientation (2006-2007), and Minister of the Interior (2007-2008).

Bartels was fired from the cabinet by President John Kufuor in 2008, allegedly due to his involvement in the missing of forty-two parcels of cocaine which were confiscated by the police, Bartels denied his involvement in that. A lot of senior NPP members said he was sacked because of his support for his close friend the then Candidate Nana Addo Dankwa Akufo-Addo, they claim the then president Kufour wanted Bartels to use his influence in the Central Region to garner votes for Alan Kyeremanteng. Bartels was said to be rooting for Akufo Addo in the Central Region. It is also alleged that Bartels channeled considerable amounts of a US-sponsored government fund meant for the Ghanaian private sector to companies owned by his daughters and sons-in-law.

== Family ==
Bartels is a member of the Euro-African Bartels family, whose ancestor Cornelius Ludewich Bartels was Governor-General of the Dutch Gold Coast between 1798 and 1804, and whose son Carel Hendrik Bartels was the most important mulatto trader on the Gold Coast in the second quarter of the nineteenth century.

== Politics ==
Bartels is a member of the New Patriotic Party. He was first elected as a member of parliament for the Ablekuma North Constituency, making him a member of the 2nd parliament of the 4th republic of Ghana on 7 January 1997 after emerging winner at the 1996 Ghanaian General Elections. He was then re-elected as the member of parliament for the Ablekuma North constituency in the Greater Accra region in the 3rd parliament of the 4th republic of Ghana.

== Elections ==
Bartels was elected as the member of parliament for the Ablekuma North constituency in the 1996 Ghanaian general elections with a majority votes of 35,747 representing 47.20% of the total valid votes. He retained his seat as a member of parliament during the 2000 Ghanaian general elections. He was elected on the ticket of the New Patriotic Party. His constituency was a part of the 16 parliamentary seats out of 22 seats won by the New Patriotic Party in that election for the Greater Accra Region. The New Patriotic Party won a majority total of 100 parliamentary seats out of 200 seats in the 3rd parliament of the 4th republic of Ghana. He was elected with 34,508 votes out of 50,012 total valid votes cast. This was equivalent to 69.2% of the total valid votes cast. He was elected over Albert Okpoti Botchway of the National Democratic Congress, Doreen Naadjah Sackey of the Convention People's Party, Isaac Kwakye Gyasi of the National Reform Party and Abdul-Jalilu Awudu of the People's National Convention. These obtained 14,236, 1,092, 0votes and 0 votes respectively out of the total valid votes cast. These were equivalent to 28.6%, 2.2%, 0% and 0% respectively of total valid votes cast.

Parliament of Ghana
Preceded by Adam Baako Nortey Yeboah	Member of Parliament for Ablekuma North; 1997 – 2009	Succeeded by Justice Joe Appiah
Political offices
Preceded by	Minister for Works and Housing; 2001 – 2003	Succeeded by Alhaji Mustapha Idris Ali
Preceded by Charles Omar Nyannor	Minister for Private Sector Development; 2003 – 2006	Succeeded by Alan John Kyerematen (Minister for Trade and Industry)
Preceded by Daniel Kwaku Botwe	Minister for Information and National Orientation; 2006 – 2007	Succeeded by Oboshie Sai-Cofie
Preceded by Albert Kan Dapaah	Minister for Interior; 2007 – 2008	Succeeded by Kwame Addo-Kufuor
