= Jake Obetsebi-Lamptey =

Ghanaian politician, television and radio producer and advertising executive

Jacob "Jake" Lantei Otanka Obetsebi-Lamptey (4 February 1946 – 20 March 2016) was a Ghanaian politician and advertising businessman. He was co-owner and general manager of Lintas W.A. (later Advantage Group) from 1974 before his assumption of cabinet roles in the government of John Kufuor from 2001 to 2007. He was national chairman of the New Patriotic Party from 2010 to 2014.

== Early life and education ==
Jake was born on 4 February 1946 in Accra, Gold Coast (now Ghana), the third son of Emmanuel Obetsebi-Lamptey, a lawyer and politician, and the second son of his Dutch wife Margaretha, Jake Obetsebi-Lamptey had his primary education in Accra, before travelling to England to further his education.

== Career ==
In 1966, he began work as a radio and TV scriptwriter, commentator and presenter at the Ghana Broadcasting Corporation (GBC). In 1969, he joined Lintas West Africa, an advertising firm, as an account executive and radio and television producer. As Client Service Manager of Lintas in Ghana in 1971, he wrote, co-ordinated and executed Family Planning, Motivation Campaign for the Ghana National Family Planning Programme. Obetsebi-Lamptey was appointed General Manager of Lintas in Ghana in 1974 and thereafter worked on a number of programmes for the company and others in Liberia, Sierra Leone and Kenya. From 1984 to 1999, he worked as a consultant to the World Health Organization (WHO). Obetsebi-Lamptey was the Plenary Speaker at the World Summit on AIDS, London, and Second International Symposium on the disease in Yaoundé, Cameroon. He was a past president of the Advertising Association of Ghana, and has several publications to his credit, covering topics from family planning to AIDS prevention in Africa.

== Political career ==
He was the national campaign manager of the victorious New Patriotic Party (NPP) during the 2000 Presidential elections, which saw the first civilian-to-civilian transition of power in Ghana.

Obetsebi-Lamptey was appointed Minister for Presidential Affairs (Chief of Staff) from 2001 to 2003 under President John Kufuor in Ghana. In a cabinet reshuffle, he was appointed Minister of Tourism and Modernization of the Capital from 2003 to 2005. From 2005 to July 2007, Obetsebi-Lamptey served as Minister of Tourism and Diasporan Relations in the cabinet of President John Kufuor. He resigned his post in July 2007 to campaign for the NPP presidential flagbearer nomination for the 2008 Presidential elections but was unsuccessful at the attempt.

In 2010, he was elected the national chairman of the New Patriotic Party. He was chairman of the political party until 2014.

== Death ==
Obetsebi-Lamptey died at a hospital in London on 20 March 2016 at the age of 70. He had been suffering from leukemia and in December had received treatment in South Africa after becoming unwell.

== See also ==
- Kufuor government

Political offices
Preceded by Kofi Totobi Quakyi	Minister for Information; 2001–03	Succeeded by Nana Akomea
Preceded by Hawa Yakubu; Minister of Tourism	Minister of Tourism and Modernization of the Capital; 2003–05	Succeeded by Stephen Asamoah-Boateng
Preceded by Hawa Yakubu; Minister of Tourism	Minister of Tourism and Diasporan Relations; 2005–07	Succeeded by Stephen Asamoah-Boateng
