= Aaron Mike Oquaye =

Ghanaian politician, lawyer and academic (born 1944)

The Right Honourable Aaron Mike Oquaye MP
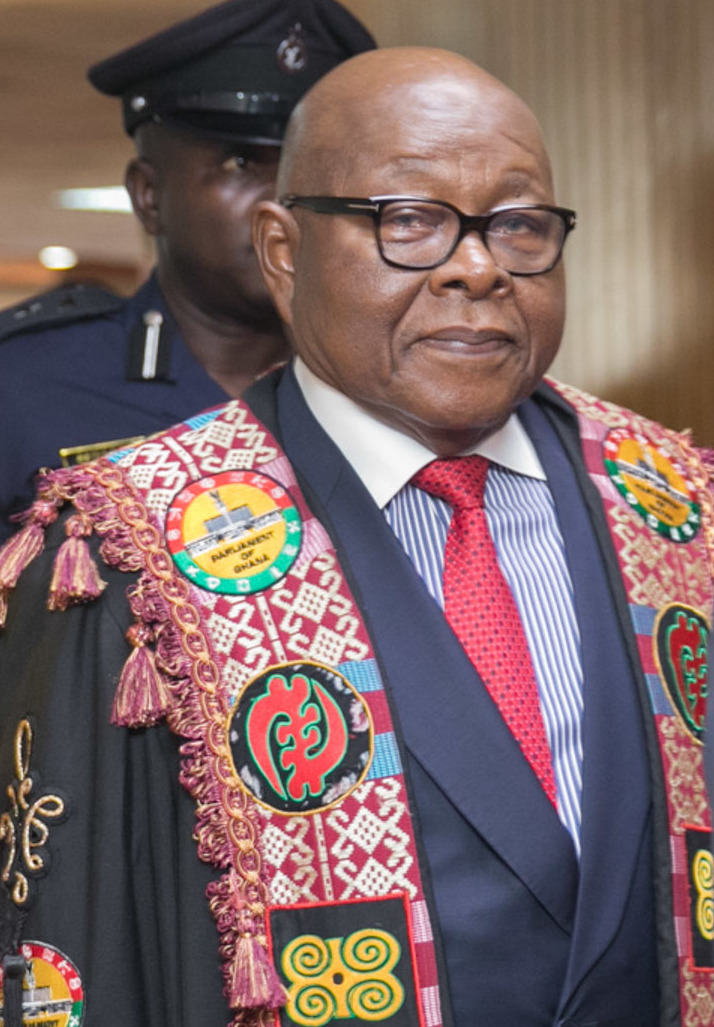
- Aaron Mike Oquaye, 2019

Speaker of the Parliament of Ghana (6th Speaker of the Fourth Republic)
- In office 7 January 2017 – 6 January 2021
- Preceded by: Edward Adjaho
- Succeeded by: Alban Bagbin

Second Deputy Speaker of Parliament
- In office 7 January 2009 – 6 January 2013
- Preceded by: Kenneth Dzirasah
- Succeeded by: Joe Ghartey

Member of Parliament for Dome-Kwabenya
- In office 7 January 2005 – 6 January 2013
- Preceded by: New constituency
- Succeeded by: Sarah Adwoa Safo

Minister for Communication
- In office January 2006 – July 2007
- Preceded by: Albert Kan-Dapaah
- Succeeded by: Benjamin Aggrey Ntim

Minister of Energy
- In office 2005–2006
- Preceded by: Paa Kwesi Nduom
- Succeeded by: Joseph Kofi Adda

High Commissioner to Maldives
- In office 2003–2005

High Commissioner to India
- In office 2001–2005

Personal details
- Born: Michael Aaron Oquaye; 4 April 1944 (age 82) Osu, Accra, Gold Coast
- Party: New Patriotic Party
- Spouse: Alberta Oquaye
- Children: 6
- Education: Presbyterian Boys' Secondary School; Apam Senior High School; University of Ghana; University of London; Lincoln's Inn
- Alma mater: SOAS University of London (Ph.D)
- Occupation: Academic; Lawyer; Politician

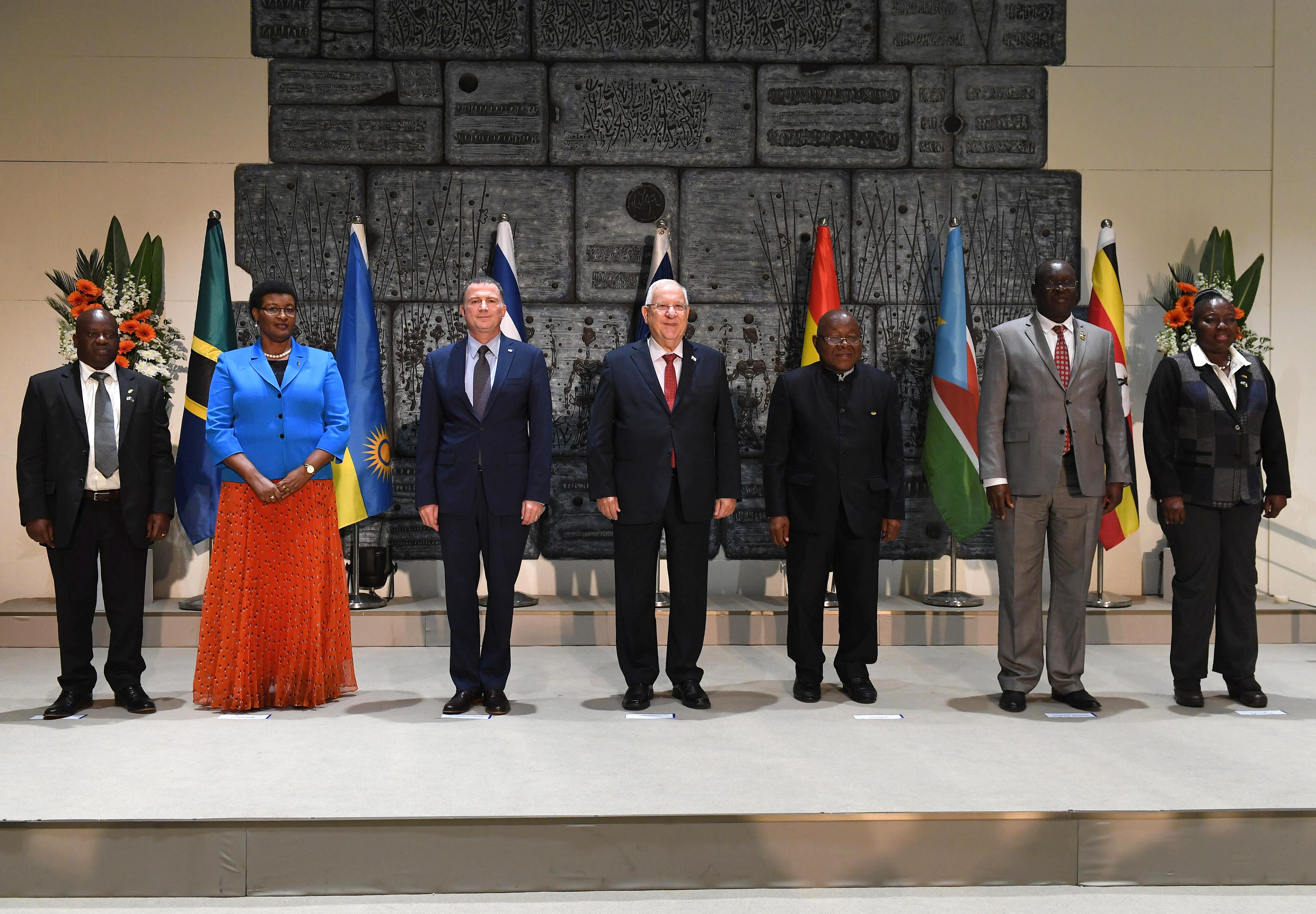
In a meeting with the President of Israel Reuven Rivlin, Israeli speaker of parliament Yuli Edelstein and other Parliament Chairman's from Africa, Beit HaNassi, December 2017 (third from right). In the background is an Israeli artwork made of crushed basalt.

Aaron Mike Oquaye (born 4 April 1944) is a Ghanaian barrister and politician who served as the sixth Speaker of Parliament of the Fourth Republic of Ghana from 2017 to 2021. An academic, diplomat and Baptist minister, he previously held the cabinet ministerial portfolios for energy and communication and was also the High Commissioner of Ghana to India (2002–04) in the Kufuor administration.

== Early life ==
Michael Aaron Oquaye was born on 4 April 1944 in Osu, Accra, Ghana (then Gold Coast), to E. G. N Oquaye of Osu and Felicia Awusika Abla Oquaye (née Azu) of Odumase-Krobo. He was brought up at Asamankese in the country's Eastern Region, where he attended the Roman Catholic Primary School and Presbyterian Middle School before proceeding to Presbyterian Boys' Secondary (PRESEC), at Odumase-Krobo and then Apam Senior High School.

Oquaye's father, E. G. N. Oquaye, had been a founding member of the United Gold Coast Convention (UGCC) at Asamankese. He was also treasurer and principal financier of the UGCC, Gold Coast Party (GCP), National Liberation Movement (NLM) and United Party (UP) at Asamankese. When Oquaye was a child, his family received political figures and dignitaries such as Dr. J. B. Danquah and Prof. Kofi Abrefa Busia as guests at their home. Okyenhene Nana Ofori Atta II, while in exile in Accra, was also a regular visitor to the Oquaye family home in Asamankese.

=== Education and legal career ===
Oquaye attended the Presbyterian Boys' Senior Secondary School, where he gained his GCE "O"-Level Certificate, and then Apam Secondary School for his "A" Level Certificates. He entered the University of Ghana and later the University of London, at Lincoln's Inn, London. He holds B.A. (Hons.) Political Science, L.L.B. (Hons.), B.L. and PhD. He is a qualified solicitor and barrister, as well as the founder and senior partner of his own law firm. He is a barrister of the Supreme Court of England and Wales, a senior member of the Ghana Bar Association, and a solicitor for some leading companies and financial institutions.

== Academic career ==
Oquaye is a professor of Political science at the University of Ghana, (Legon), and was previously the Head of the Department of Political Science and member of the university's Academic Board, the highest authority at the level of the faculties. He received his Ph.D. from the School of Oriental and African Studies in London, as well as winning the Rockefeller Senior Scholar Award in 1993 and the Senior Fulbright Scholar Award in 1997. He has been a visiting lecturer at George Mason University in Virginia. From 1997 to 1999, he was vice-president of the African Association of Political Science (AAPS), based in Zimbabwe.

=== Writings and advocacy ===
As a writer, Oquaye has researched and published writings extensively on good governance, conflicts, political education, decentralization and development, human rights, military intervention in politics, NGOs, rural development and gender issues. He advocates women's rights, including affirmative action.

He is the author of the award-winning book Politics in Ghana, 1972–1979, in which he depicts, inter-alia, the military as the bane of Government and Politics in Africa and recounted instances of human right abuses, conflictual politics, economic mismanagement and national decadence. He wrote a second volume, Politics in Ghana, 1982–1992, dealing with the politics of revolution, CDRs, Public Tribunals, popular power, positive defiance and human rights issues of the period. His scholarly articles have been published in international journals such as the Human Rights Quarterly (US), Journal of Commonwealth and Comparative Politics (UK), African Affairs (UK), and Review of Human Factor Studies (Canada).

== Political career ==
As a student at the University of Ghana, Oquaye joined the campaign for the J. B. Danquah / Kofi Abrefa Busia cause. Oquaye strongly supported Busia's call for quick return to civilian rule to prevent the militarization of the state and, along with his family, helped to establish the Progress Party in Osu in 1969.

=== New Patriotic Party ===
The United Party-Progress Party tradition led to the foundation, in 1992, of the New Patriotic Party (NPP), with Oquaye as a founding member. He was the first Regional Secretary of NPP for Greater Accra in 1992, and also the first Chairman of the Party for the Ga District Rural Constituency, which later split into Ga West District and Ga East District. He was the secretary of the Research Committee and a member of the first National Campaign Team of the NPP in the third quarter of 1992.

He worked with other central NPP figures, including President John Kufuor, Nana Addo Dankwa Akufo-Addo, R. R. Amponsah, Prof. Adu-Boahen, Peter Ala Adjetey, B. J. da Rocha and Samuel Odoi-Sykes, to campaign successfully for the NPP victory in the 2000 general elections. Oquaye's role in the party's success, which involved journalistic contributions and involvement in other activities of the party between 1993 and 2000, is considered significant.

=== High Commissioner and Minister of state ===
From 2001 to 2004, Oquaye served as Ghana's High Commissioner to India. In February 2005, he became Minister of Energy, and later he was moved to the post of Minister of Communications.

=== Member of Parliament ===
Oquaye was the NPP Member of Parliament for Dome-Kwabenya for two terms, from 2004 to 2012. He decided not to stand for another term. He sponsored his son, Mike Oquaye Jnr, to fight to be the NPP Parliamentary Candidate for the constituency. His son however lost to Sarah Adwoa Safo, who went on to win the seat.

From 2009 to 2013, Oquaye was the Second Deputy Speaker of Parliament. He was succeeded by Joe Ghartey in 2013.

=== Speaker of Parliament ===
Oquaye served as the Speaker of Parliament in the seventh parliament of the Fourth Republic. In 2021, he was renominated by the New Patriotic Party for the role, but he lost to opposition candidate, Alban Kingsford Sumani Bagbin. Alban Kingsford Sumani Bagbin announced at the first sitting of parliament that he was elected by 138 votes while Mike Oquaye garnered 136 votes.

Oquaye as he endorses the World March for Peace and Nonviolence

== Personal life ==
Oquaye is a pastor of the Baptist Church. He is married to Alberta Oquaye (née Asafu-Adjaye) (Major Rtd.) a professional nurse. He is the father of Mike Oquaye Jnr, Ghana's former High Commissioner to India.

Oquaye's hobbies include watching football, playing table tennis, reading books, writing, and listening to music.

== Bibliography ==
=== Written works ===
- Politics in Ghana, 1982–1992 (Tornado Publications, 1980, ISBN 9789964980085)
- Democracy, Politics and Conflict Resolution in Contemporary Ghana (Gold-Type Publication, 1995)

== Controversies ==
In February 2020, there was media agitation to reports that the speaker of Parliament, Aaron Mike Oquaye has threatened to ban journalists who take coverage of other events in the premises of Parliament other than the chamber.

In August 2020, he gave a public lecture in the observance of Founders' Day, in which he claimed that "Independence was not a one man show, it was a collective effort". According to Oquaye, former president Kwame Nkrumah should not be honoured alone but together with all the founding fathers of Ghana. Oquaye also claimed Nkrumah was not alone in the struggle for independence although he fought for Ghana's independence. Nkrumah's son Sekou Nkrumah lambasted Prof. Oquaye for those comments, saying that if the speaker of parliament wanted to criticize his late father, he should talk about the one-party system and the Preventive Detention Act (PDA) introduced during Nkrumah's time.

Diplomatic posts
Preceded by ?	High Commissioner to India^{1} 2001 – 2005	Succeeded by ?
Preceded by ?	High Commissioner to Maldives; 2003 – 2005	Succeeded by ?
Parliament of Ghana
Preceded by ?	Member of Parliament for Dome-Kwabenya^{1,2} 2005 – 6 January 2013	Succeeded by Sarah Adwoa Safo
Preceded by Ken Dzirasah	2nd Deputy Speaker Parliament of Ghana^{1,2} 2009 – 6 January 2013	Succeeded by Joe Ghartey
Preceded by Edward Adjaho	Speaker Parliament of Ghana^{1,2} 7 January 2017 – 6 January 2021	Succeeded by Alban Bagbin
Political offices
Preceded by Cletus Avoka; Minister for Environment, Science & Technology	Minister for Environment and Science; 2001 – 2005	Succeeded by Christine Churcher
Preceded by Paa Kwesi Nduom	Minister of Energy^{1} 2005 – 2006	Succeeded by Joseph Kofi Adda
Preceded by Albert Kan-Dapaah; Minister for Communication & Technology	Minister for Communication^{1} 2006 - 2009	Succeeded by Haruna Iddrisu
Preceded by Edward Adjaho	Speaker of the Parliament of Ghana; 2017 – 2021	Succeeded by Alban Bagbin
Notes and references
1. Ghana government website 2. Official Local Government website
