= Christopher Ameyaw-Akumfi =

Ghanaian academic and politician

Hon. Christopher Ameyaw-Akumfi
- Constituency: Techiman North

Member of Parliament
- In office 7 January 2009 – 6 January 2013
- President: John Atta Mills
- Preceded by: Alex Kyeremeh
- Succeeded by: Alex Kyeremeh

Personal details
- Born: 21 January 1945 (age 81)
- Party: New Patriotic Party
- Education: University of Michigan, USA
- Occupation: Educationist

Christopher Ameyaw-Akumfi (born 21 January 1945 in Techiman, Bono East Region) is a Ghanaian academic and politician. Ameyaw-Akumfi was the Minister of Education in the John Agyekum Kufour administration.

== Early life and politics ==
Christopher Ameyaw-Akumfi was born on 21 January 1945 at his hometown Jama-Techiman in his constituency. He began his political career after being elected into parliament in 2008 obtaining over 53.4% of the total votes.

== Education ==
Ameyaw-Akumfi attended Adisadel College in Cape Coast for his GCE O' and A' Levels. He entered the University of Ghana in 1965 and graduated with a Bachelor of Science degree in Zoology in 1969 and earned his master's degree in the same field a year later. In 1970, he left to study Zoology at the University of Michigan in the United States, where he earned his doctorate in 1972.

== Professional career ==
Ameyaw-Akumfi has participated in both University of Cape Coast and University of Ghana system for many years and has been especially instrumental in the reform and decentralization of the university system in the country.

Parliament of Ghana
Preceded by Alex Kyeremeh	Member of Parliament for Techiman-North; 2009 – 2013
Political offices
Preceded by Christopher Ameyaw-Akumfi	Succeeded by Alex Kyeremeh
