= Joseph Kofi Adda =

Ghanaian politician (1956–2021)

Minister for Aviation
- In office 2018–2021
- President: Akufo-Addo

Member of Parliament for Navrongo Central
- In office March 2003 – January 2013
- Preceded by: John Achuliwor
- Succeeded by: Mark Woyongo

Minister for Energy
- In office 28 April 2006 – 2008
- President: John Kufuor
- Preceded by: Aaron Mike Oquaye
- Succeeded by: Felix Owusu-Adjapong

Member of Parliament for Navrongo Constituency
- In office 7 January 2005 – 6 January 2009
- President: John Kufuor

Personal details
- Born: 22 April 1956 Navrongo, Gold Coast
- Died: 14 October 2021 (aged 65) Accra, Ghana
- Party: New Patriotic Party
- Children: Two
- Education: Indiana Wesleyan University; Columbia University; St. John's School, Sekondi
- Profession: Financial Economist; Management Consultant

Joseph Kofi Kowe Adda (22 April 1956 – 14 October 2021) was a Ghanaian politician, who served as a Member of Parliament and also the Minister for Aviation in the New Patriotic Party government under President Akufo-Addo until January 2021. He was also a Financial Economist and a Management Consultant.

== Early life and education ==
Joseph Adda was born at Navrongo, the capital of the Kassena-Nankana District in the Upper East Region of Ghana. He had his secondary education at St. John's School, Sekondi and obtained a Bachelor of Science degree in politics and economics from the Indiana Wesleyan University, Marion, Indiana, United States, which he attended between 1979 and 1982. Between 1982 and 1984, he was at Columbia University, New York, where he studied for a Master's degree in International Affairs, specialising in Finance and Banking. He went on to get a graduate certificate in African Studies from the same university. In 1989, he obtained a certificate in French language and civilization from the Sorbonne University, Paris, France.

== Early career ==
Joseph Adda was a Financial Economist and a Management Consultant. He worked as an executive officer at the Ministry of Trade and Industry, Ghana in 1979. Between 1983 and 1984, he worked as a Research Analyst intern at the Third World Trade Institute, New York, USA. Over the next two years, he was an account Executive and Management trainee at the Equitable Financial Service, Inc., in New Jersey, USA. Mr. Adda has also worked at Essex County College, Newark, New Jersey, USA (1986 – 1988), Thomson McKinnon Securities Inc., New York (1989 – 1991) and with Deloitte and Touche Consulting, (West Africa), Accra (1991 – 1994). Since 1994, Joseph Adda has been the director of Omni Consulting International (Ghana) Ltd. Between 1996 and 2000, he worked in various capacities at the Ministry of Finance, Ghana.

== Elections ==
Adda first became a Member of Parliament in 2003. He won the by-election for the Navrongo Central constituency of the Upper East Region of Ghana after the death of the incumbent, John Achuliwor. He retained his seat in the 2004 parliamentary election. He won on the ticket of the New Patriotic Party. His constituency was a part of the 2 parliamentary seats out of 13 seats won by the New Patriotic Party in that election for the Upper East Region. The New Patriotic Party won a majority total of 128 parliamentary seats out of 230 seats. He was elected with 12,444 votes out of 31,657 total valid votes cast. This was equivalent to 39.3% of total valid votes cast. He was elected over Gabriel Pwamang of the Peoples’ National Convention, Andema Emmanuel of the National Democratic Congress, Azantinlwo Anemana Jennifer Grace of the Convention People's Party, Bagonia Grace of the Democratic People's Party, Donald Amuah and Achuliwor A. Otito Werseh both independent candidates. These obtained 6,512, 6,201, 140, 83, 2,262 and 4,015 votes respectively out of the total valid votes cast. These were equivalent to 20.6%, 19.6%, 0.4%, 0.3%, 7.1% and 12.7% respectively of total valid votes cast.

== Politics ==
Adda was appointed the Minister for Manpower Development and Employment by President John Kufuor in 2005. On 28 April 2006, he was moved in a cabinet reshuffle to the position of Minister for Energy. He was later replaced by Felix Owusu-Adjapong as Minister of Energy by President Kuffuor. Joe Adda retained his seat when the NPP lost the general elections in 2008. He however lost the seat in the 2012 elections to Mark Woyongo.

In May 2017, President Nana Akufo-Addo named Joseph Kofi Adda as part of nineteen ministers who would form his cabinet. The names of the 19 ministers were submitted to the Parliament of Ghana and announced by the Speaker of the House, Rt. Hon. Prof. Mike Ocquaye. As a Cabinet minister, Joseph Kofi Adda was part of the inner circle of the president and aided key decision-making activities in the country.

== Personal life ==
Adda was married with two children. He was a Christian. He was a Catholic.

== Death ==
Adda died in the early hours of Thursday, 14 October 2021, at the Legon Hospital in Accra.

Parliament of Ghana
Preceded by John Setuni Achuliwor	Member of Parliament for Navrongo Central; 2003 – 2013	Succeeded by Mark Woyongo
Political offices
Preceded by Yaw Barimah	Minister for Manpower Development and Employment; 2005 – 2006	Succeeded by Boniface Abubakar Saddique
Preceded by Aaron Mike Oquaye	Minister for Energy; 2006 – 2008	Succeeded by Felix Owusu-Adjapong
Notes and references
1. Member of Parliament for Navrongo Central; 2. Minister for Manpower Development and Employment; 3. Minister for Energy
