= Kofi Konadu Apraku =

Ghanaian Politician

Hon. Kofi Konadu Apraku

Member of Parliament for Offinso North constituency
- In office 7 January 1997 – 6 January 2009
- President: John Kufuor

Personal details
- Born: 7 September 1954 (age 71)
- Party: New Patriotic Party
- Education: Oregon State University

Kofi Konadu Apraku is a Ghanaian politician and economist and a member of the 2nd, 3rd and 4th Parliament of the 4th Republic of Ghana. He is a member of the New Patriotic Party. He was the member of Parliament for the Offinso North constituency in the fourth parliament of the fourth Republic of Ghana.

== Early life and education ==
Konadu Apraku was born at Akumadan in the Asante region of Ghana on 7 September 1954. He had his primary and middle school in Akumadan. He attended the Tweneboa Kodua Secondary School between 1967 and 1972. He attended South Albany High School in Oregon, United States, after winning an AFS International essay competition, after which he studied for economics degrees at the Oregon State University, taking a doctorate in the subject.

== Career ==
Apraku was minister for Regional Cooperation and NEPAD in the Kufuor administration from 2003 to 2006. He also served as the minister of Trade and Industry under Kufour from 2001 to 2003.

In 2008, he was appointed by the Economic Community of West African States (ECOWAS) Council of Ministers as commissioner for Macro economic Policy and Economic Research. He liaises with the World Bank, the International Monetary Fund, and African Development Bank, among other financial institutions to support the development of ECOWAS regions.

Apraku has had an extensive and successful professional career in the private and public sector.

== Politics ==
Apraku was first voted into parliament on 7 January 1997 to represent his constituency. He polled 10,456 votes out of the 21,428 valid votes cast, representing 37.80%. He contested against Nana Oduro-Baah, an NDC member who polled 10,257 votes, representing 37.10%, Manu Yaw Joseph, a PNC member who polled 358 votes, representing 1.30%, and Emmanuel Kwame Boakye an IND member who polled 357 votes, representing 1.30%.

Apraku was reelected on 7 January 2001 after he emerged winner of the 2000 Ghanaian general elections, having polled 13,160 votes out of the 21,543 valid votes cast, representing 61.00%. He was also re-elected as the member of Parliament for Offinso North Constituency of the Asante Region in the 2004 Ghanaian general elections with 13,389 votes, representing 50.30% of the total votes cast. He was among the 17 aspirants who contested in 2007 for the slot of flag-bearer of the New Patriotic Party, going into the 2008 elections.

== Personal life ==
Apraku is a devoted Christian.

== See also ==
- List of MPs elected in the 2004 Ghanaian parliamentary election
