= Ernest Debrah =

Ghanaian politician

Hon. Ernest Akobuor Debrah

29th Minister for Food and Agriculture (Ghana)
- In office February 2005 – January 2009
- President: John Kufuor
- Preceded by: Major Courage Quashigah
- Succeeded by: Kwesi Ahwoi

Member of Parliament for Tano North

Member of Parliament for Tano North
- In office 7 January 2009 – 6 January 2013
- President: John Atta Mills; John Mahama
- Succeeded by: Freda Prempeh

Member of Parliament for Tano North
- In office 7 January 2005 – 6 January 2009
- President: John Kufuor
- Preceded by: Joe Donkor

Personal details
- Born: 3 June 1947
- Died: April 6, 2016 (aged 68) Accra, Ghana
- Resting place: Tanoso near Sunyani
- Party: New Patriotic Party
- Children: 5
- Education: Kwame Nkrumah University of Science and Technology
- Profession: Economist/Banker

Ernest Akobuor Debrah (3 June 1947 – 6 April 2016) was a Ghanaian politician.

== Early life and education ==
Ernest Kwaku Akobour Debrah was born on 3 June 1947 to James Emmanuel Debrah and Elizabeth Akosua Kontoh Debrah. He was the 3rd of twelve children born to his parents. He hails from Tanoso in the Brong Ahafo Region of Ghana. After his basic and secondary education at Sunyani Secondary School and Ghana National College, Ernest Debrah graduated from Kwame Nkrumah University of Science and Technology in 1972 with a Bachelor of Science degree in Land Economy. He then proceeded to acquire a Master of Business Administration degree in management at the University of Strathclyde, Glasgow in 1995.

== Career ==
Debrah was an economist by profession. He has worked as the chief manager of the Retain Banking Unit at the head office of Société Générale - Social Security Bank, later known as Societe Generale Ghana Limited.

=== Politics ===
Debrah was the Member of Parliament for the Tano North constituency in the 4th and 5th parliaments of the 4th republic of Ghana. He was the Minister for Food and Agriculture (February 2005 to January 2009), having previously served as Regional Minister for Brong-Ahafo and then Regional Minister for the Northern Region from February 2001 to January 2004. He was elected to Parliament from Tano North in December 2004. He was given an award in 2009 during the Farmers' Day celebrations.

=== Elections ===
Debrah was first elected as the member of parliament for the Tano North constituency in the 2004 Ghanaian general elections. He was elected with 15,868 votes out of 26,983 total valid votes cast. This was equivalent to 58.80% of total valid votes cast. He was elected over Charles Appiagyei of the National Democratic Congress, Nyamekye Florence of the Democratic People's Party, Daniel Dabie Boateng of the People's National Convention and Nana Ampabeng Daniel K Kyeremeh of the Convention People's Party. These obtained 10,253 votes, 485 votes, 210 votes and 167votes respectively of the total valid votes cast. These were equivalent to 38.00%, 1.80%, 0.80% and 0.60% respectively of all total valid votes cast in that election. Debrah won on the ticket of the New Patriotic Party. His constituency was a part of the 14constituencies out of 24 constituencies won by the New Patriotic Party in the Brong Ahafo region in that election. In all, the New Patriotic Party won a majority total of 128 parliamentary representation out of 230 parliamentary seats in the 4th parliament of the 4th republic of Ghana.

Debrah was re-elected as the Member of parliament for the Tano North constituency in the 2008 Ghanaian general elections. He was elected with 15,868votes out of 26983 total valid votes cast. This was equivalent to 58.80% of total valid votes cast. He was elected over Opoku Atuahene of the National Democratic Congress, Alhassan Kabore of the Convention People's Party, George Owusu Yeboah of the People's National Convention, Arkoh Ernest of the Democratic Freedom Party and Amanfo Antwi of the Democratic People's Party. These obtained 11,120votes, 363 votes, 214votes, 144votes and 101votes respectively of the total valid votes cast. These were equivalent to 38.36%, 1.25%, 0.74%, 0.50% and 0.35% respectively of total valid votes cast. Debrah was re-elected on the ticket of the New Patriotic Party. His constituency was a part of 16 parliamentary seats out of 24 seats won by the New Patriotic Party in the Brong Ahafo region in that election. In all, the New Patriotic Party won a minority total of 107 parliamentary representation out of 230 seats in the 5th parliament of the 4th republic of Ghana.

== Personal life ==
Ernest Akobuor Debrah was a Christian and married with four children. He died after a brief illness on Wednesday 6 April 2016, at his residence.

Parliament of Ghana
Preceded by Joe Donkor	Member of Parliament for Tano North; 2005 – 2013	Incumbent
Political offices
Preceded by ?	Northern Region Minister ? –?	Succeeded by ?
Preceded by ?	Brong Ahafo Region Minister; 2001 –2004	Succeeded by ?
Preceded by Courage Quashigah	Minister for Food and Agriculture; 2005 –2009	Succeeded by Kwesi Ahwoi
