= Benjamin Aggrey Ntim =

Ghanaian politician

Ben Aggrey Ntim is a Ghanaian engineer and politician. He was Minister for Communication under President John Kufour.

== Educational life ==
Ntim received his Bachelor of Science in engineering with 1st Class Honors in 1966. He then proceeded to the London University for a Doctor of Philosophy in aeronautical engineering.

== Engineering career ==
Ntim worked as an engineer at Rolls-Royce subsequent to achieving his Ph.D. At Rolls-Royce he worked on the research and design of compressor blades. Upon leaving Rolls-Royce Ntim joined UNESCO as a specialist in engineering. Ntim is the current Director Chairmen of Omatek Computers Ltd.

Preceded by Mike Oquaye	Minister for Communication; 2007–2009	Succeeded by Haruna Iddrisu
