= Stephen Asamoah Boateng =

Ghanaian politician (born 1958)

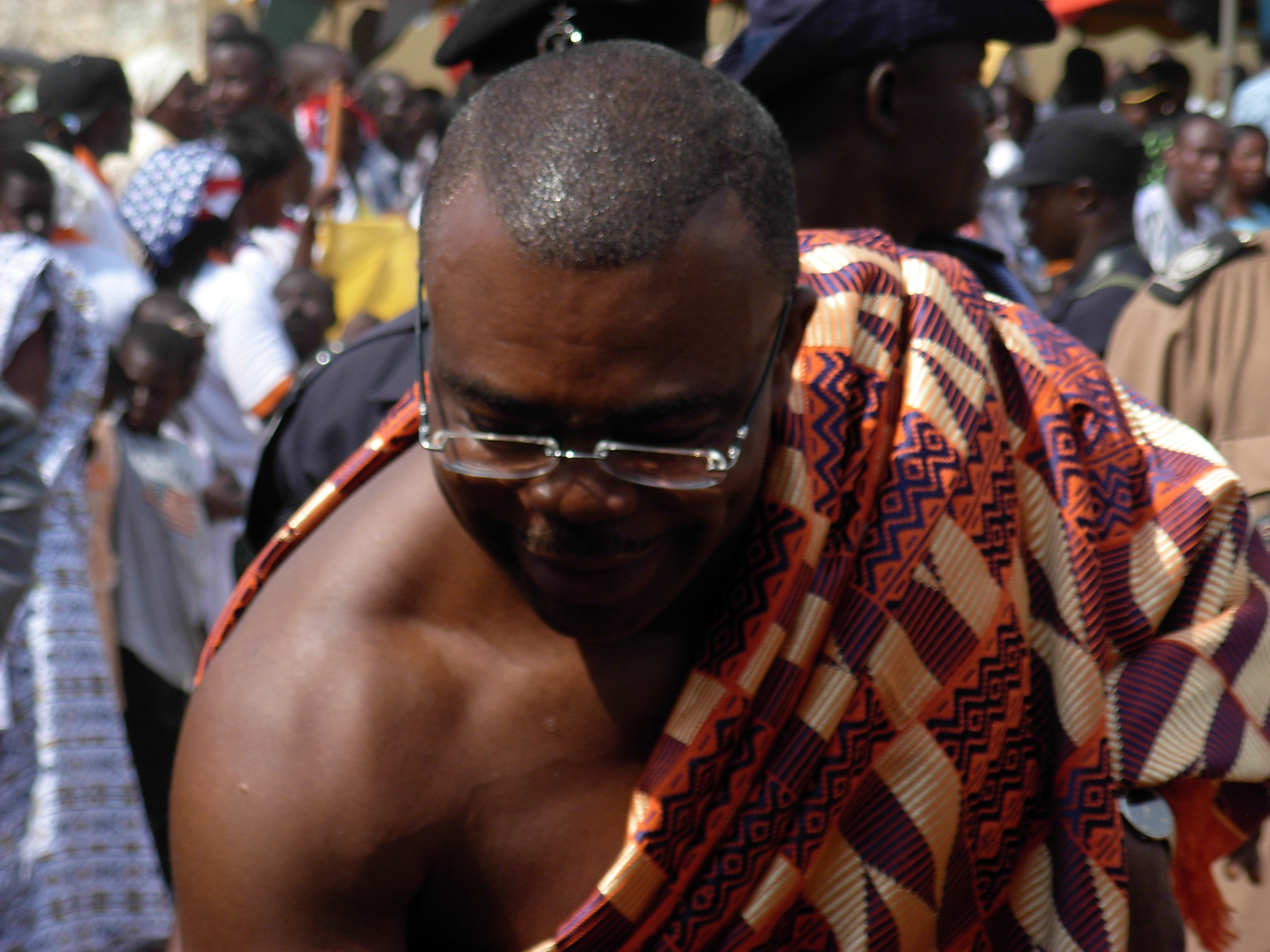
- A portrait of Stephen Asamoah Boateng

Member of Parliament for Mfantsiman West
- In office 7 January 2005 – 6 January 2009
- President: John Agyekum Kufuor
- Preceded by: Jacob Evans Aidoo
- Succeeded by: Aquinas Tawiah Quansah

Personal details
- Born: August 18, 1958 (age 68) Konongo, Ashanti Region, Ghana
- Party: New Patriotic Party
- Spouse: Zuleika Lorwia
- Children: 7, including Samuel Nana Yaw Boateng
- Education: University of Ghana, Henley Business School
- Occupation: Politician, Businessman

Stephen Asamoah Boateng (born August 18, 1958) is a Ghanaian politician and a former member of parliament for the Mfantsiman West constituency of the Central region of Ghana. He is a former Minister for Local Government Rural Development and Environment, Tourism and Diaspora Relations. Boateng is also a former minister of information and National Orientation as well as a former chief executive officer of the State Enterprise committee. He is currently the Director general of the State Interest and Governance Authority (SIGA).

== Early life and education ==
Boateng was born in 1958 and hails from Kormantse in the Central Region of Ghana. He attained his basic education at the Konongo Methodist primary school, Kormantse District Assembly Middle Schools and Jasikan Roman Catholic Middle school and then proceeded to obtain his senior high school education at Konongo/Odumase Senior High School. Boateng obtained his first degree from the University of Ghana and a master's degree in business administration at Henley Management College Oxfordshire in the United Kingdom. During his stay in the United Kingdom, he worked as a Marketing Consultant at the American Medical Systems (AMS) of Pfizer Pharmaceuticals. He was also a Business Advisor at Business Link in London as well as a Housing Officer at the Royal Borough of Kensington, Chelsea. He worked as a public servant with the position of a store assistant at the Ghana Medical Stores in Kumasi.

== Politics ==
Boateng is a member of the 4th parliament of the 4th republic of Ghana. His political career began in his early days as a political activist. He became the President of the Madina Students Union and the secretary of the Central Committee of National Union of Ghana Students (NUGS) from 1979 to 1982. He participated in the 2004 general elections as a representative of Mfantseman Constituency on the ticket of the New Patriotic Party and was elected as the member of parliament with a total of 28,081 votes out of 49,618 total valid votes cast that year. His constituency was a part of the 16 constituencies won by the New Patriotic Party in the Central region in that elections. His parliamentary term ended in the 2008 general elections after losing his seat to Aquinas Tawiah Quansah of the National Democratic Congress. He was appointed by President Nana Addo Dankwa Akuffo Addo as the executive chairman of the State Enterprise Committee in 2017. Boateng was later appointed the director general of the State Interest And Governance (SIGA) Committee by the same president.

== Personal life ==
Boateng is a Christian. He is married to Zuleika Lorwia, with whom he has seven children including Samuel Nana Yaw Boateng.

== See also ==
- List of MPs elected in the 2004 Ghanaian parliamentary election
