= Albert Kan-Dapaah =

Chartered accountant, politician, minister and member of parliament

Hon. Albert Kan-Dapaah

Minister for National Security
- Incumbent
- Assumed office 27 January 2017
- President: Nana Akufo-Addo

19th Minister for Defence
- In office August 2007 – January 2009
- President: John Kufuor
- Preceded by: Kwame Addo-Kufuor
- Succeeded by: Joseph Henry Smith

29th Minister for the Interior
- In office May 2006 – August 2007
- President: John Kufuor
- Preceded by: Papa Owusu-Ankomah
- Succeeded by: Kwamena Bartels

20th Minister for Communications
- In office 2003–2006
- President: John Kufuor
- Preceded by: Felix Owusu-Adjapong
- Succeeded by: Mike Oquaye

Minister for Energy
- In office 2001–2003
- President: John Kufuor
- Preceded by: John Frank Abu
- Succeeded by: Paa Kwesi Nduom

Member of Parliament for Afigya Sekyere West
- In office 7 January 1997 – 6 January 2013
- Preceded by: Beatrice Aboagye
- Succeeded by: constituency abolished

Personal details
- Born: 14 March 1953 (age 73)
- Party: New Patriotic Party
- Children: 4
- Profession: Chartered accountant

Albert Kan-Dapaah (born 14 March 1953) is a Ghanaian chartered accountant and politician. He served as the Minister for National Security of Ghana under President Nana Akufo-Addo from 2017 to 2024.

== Early life and education ==
Kan-Dapaah was born on 14 March 1953. He is an Ashanti and hails from Maase-Boaman in the Ashanti Region of Ghana. Albert Kan-Dapaah had his secondary education at Acherensua Secondary School from 1964 to 1969. He then studied Accountancy at the Institute of Professional Studies (IPS), Legon. He had further Accountancy courses at the North East London Polytechnic, London and the Emile Woolf College of Accountancy.

== Career ==
Kan-Dapaah worked with Pannel Kerr Forster, a chartered accounting firm as an Audit Senior. He worked in their offices in Monrovia, Liberia and London, UK between 1978 and 1986. Back in Ghana, he was the head of Audit at the Social Security and National Insurance Trust (SSNIT) from January 1987. In September 1987, he joined the Electricity Corporation of Ghana where he rose from Director of Audit to become Director for Finance, a position he held for six years.

Kan-Dapaah was a partner in Kwesie, Kan-Dapaah and Baah Co., a firm of Chartered Accountants in Accra. He was also managing Consultant of Kan-Dapaah and Associates, a utility consultancy support group. He has also lectured Auditing part-time at the School of Business Administration, University of Ghana and the University of Professional studies.

== Politics ==
Albert Kan-Dapaah was the Ashanti Regional Representative on the National Council of the New Patriotic Party (NPP) between 1992 and 1996. He was also a member of the Finance and Economic Affairs Committee of the NPP. He won the Afigya-Sekyere seat at the 1996 parliamentary election. He took his seat in January 1997 in opposition and has held his seat in the two subsequent parliamentary elections in 2000 and 2004. He became Minister for Energy in the Kufuor government after the NPP won power in the 2000 elections. During the April 2003 cabinet reshuffle, he became the Minister for Communications and Technology. He became the Minister for Interior during Kufuor's second term.

== Elections ==
In the year 2000, Kan-Dapaah won the general elections as the member of parliament for the Afigya Sekyere West constituency of the Ashanti Region of Ghana. He won on the ticket of the New Patriotic Party. His constituency was a part of the 31 parliamentary seats out of 33 seats won by the New Patriotic Party in that election for the Ashanti Region. The New Patriotic Party won a majority total of 99 parliamentary seats out of 200 seats. He was elected with 10,605 votes out of 14,878 total valid votes cast. This was equivalent to 72.2% of the total valid votes cast. He was elected over Beatrice Aboagye of the National Democratic Congress, S.Osei Yaw of the Convention People's Party, Agyem Vincent of the People's National Convention and Tawiah Joseph of the New Reformed Party. These won 3,806, 129, 82 and 62 votes out of the total valid votes cast respectively. These were equivalent to 25.9%, 0.9%, 0.6%, and 0.4% respectively of total valid votes cast.

Kan-Dapaah was elected as the member of parliament for the Afigya-Sekyere West constituency of the Ashanti Region of Ghana for the third time in the 2004 Ghanaian general elections. He won on the ticket of the New Patriotic Party. His constituency was a part of the 36 parliamentary seats out of 39 seats won by the New Patriotic Party in that election for the Ashanti Region. The New Patriotic Party won a majority total of 128 parliamentary seats out of 230 seats. He was elected with 13,936 votes out of 17,863 total valid votes cast equivalent to 78% of total valid votes cast. He was elected over Ampofo Stephen of the Peoples' National Convention, Joseph Baah of the National Democratic Congress and A.S. Osei Yaw of the Convention People's Party. These obtained 0.8%, 20.1%, and 1% respectively of total valid votes cast.

In 2008, he won the general elections on the ticket of the New Patriotic Party for the same constituency. His constituency was part of the 34 parliamentary seats out of 39 seats won by the New Patriotic Party in that election for the Ashanti Region. The New Patriotic Party won a minority total of 109 parliamentary seats out of 230 seats. He was elected with 13,824 votes out of 18,747 total valid votes cast equivalent to 73.74% of total valid votes cast. He was elected over Joyce Oduro of the Peoples' National Congress, Joseph Baah of the National Democratic Congress and James Gyimah Dabo of the Convention People's Party. These obtained 1.28%, 23.07%, and 1.91% respectively of the total votes cast.

== Personal life ==
Kan-Dapaah is married with four children. He is the uncle of Collins Adomako-Mensah. In 2021, he was installed as Assistant Grand Master of Freemasons in Ghana.

== Controversy ==
On 15 January 2020, a video of a flirtatious WhatsApp video call between Albert Kan-Dapaah and a young woman popped up on social media leading to several calls for his resignation from the position as National Security Minister.

== Other positions held ==
- 1996 - President of the Institute of Chartered Accountants, Ghana
- 1996 - Vice-president, Association of Accountancy Bodies in West Africa

Parliament of Ghana
Preceded by Beatrice Aboagye	Member of Parliament for Afigya Sekyere West; 1997 –2013	Succeeded by constituency abolished
Political offices
Preceded by John Frank Abu; Minister for Mines and Energy	Minister for Energy; 2001 – 2003	Succeeded by Paa Kwesi Nduom
Preceded by Felix Owusu-Adjapong; Minister for Transport and Communications	Minister for Communications; 2003 – 2006	Succeeded by Mike Oquaye
Preceded by Papa Owusu-Ankomah	Minister for the Interior; May 2006 – August 2007	Succeeded by Kwamena Bartels
Preceded by Kwame Addo-Kufuor	Minister for Defence; August 2007 – January 2009	Succeeded by Lt. Gen. Joseph Henry Smith
