= Amenfi East (Ghana parliament constituency) =

Ghanaian constituency

- constituency for the Parliament of Ghana
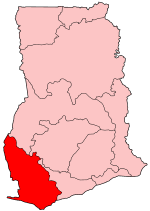
- District: Wasa Amenfi East District
- Region: Western Region of Ghana

Current constituency
- Party: National Democratic Congress
- MP: Nicholas Amankwah

Amenfi East is one of the constituencies represented in the Parliament of Ghana. It elects one Member of Parliament (MP) by the first past the post system of election. Nicholas Amankwah is the member of parliament for the constituency. He was elected on the ticket of the New Patriotic Party (NPP) and won a majority of 2,333 votes to become the MP. He was also the incumbent MP during the 2008 parliamentary elections of Ghana.

== See also ==
- List of Ghana Parliament constituencies
