= Malik Al-Hassan Yakubu =

Ghanaian politician (born 1945)

Member of Pan-African Parliament
- Incumbent
- Assumed office 2004
- Constituency: Ghana

Minister for Interior
- In office 2001–2002
- Preceded by: Nii Okaidja Adamafio
- Succeeded by: Hackman Owusu-Agyeman

Personal details
- Party: New Patriotic Party

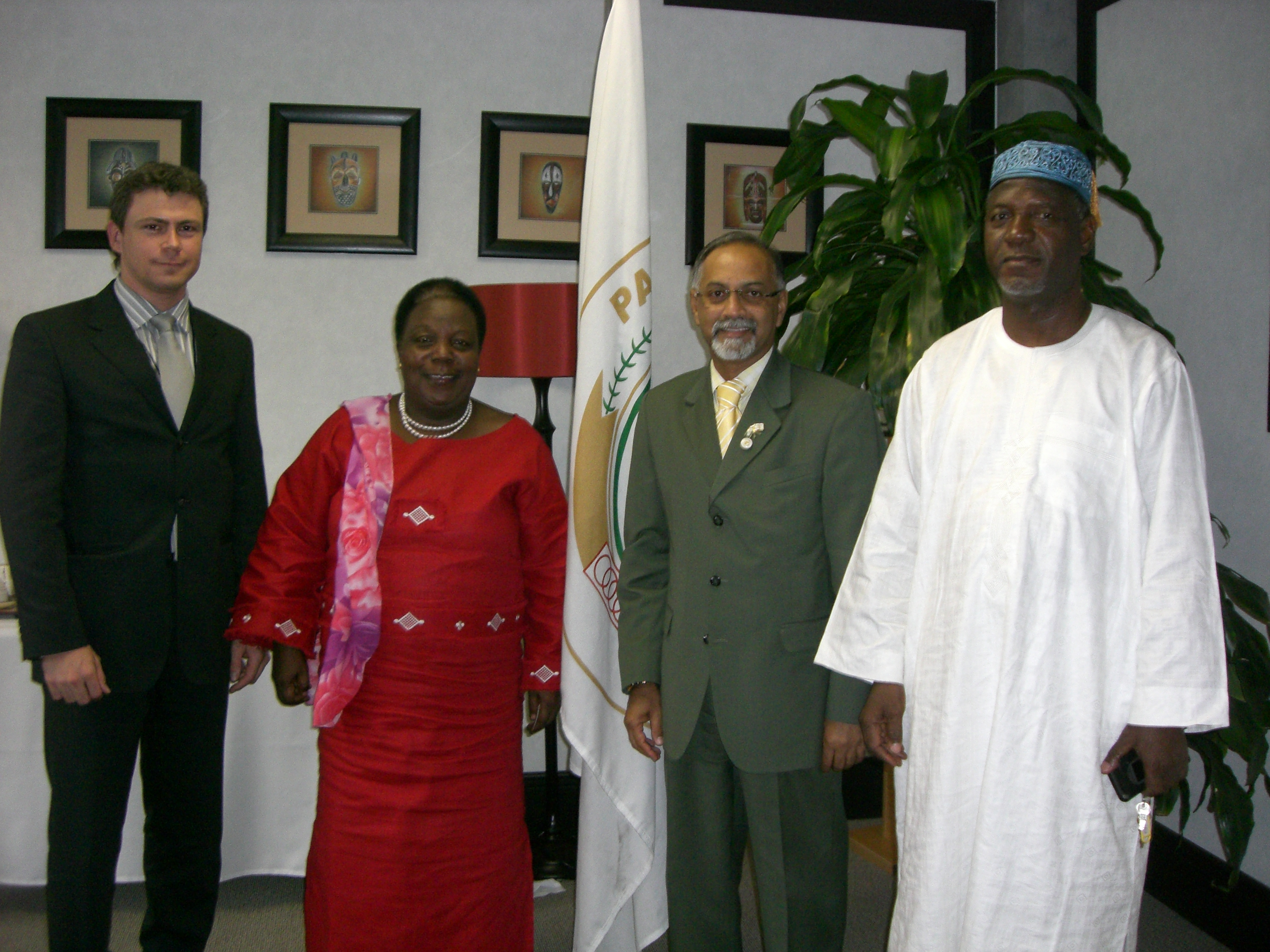
Yakubu with Gertrude Mongella (second left)

Malik al-Hassan Yakubu is a Ghanaian lawyer, Politician and member of the New Patriotic Party. He was a member of parliament for Yendi and member of the Pan-African Parliament. He was Minister of Interior, but resigned in 2002 amid accusations of backing one of the sides in a violent Chieftaincy conflict in Yendi which led to the death of Yakubu II.

== Early life and education ==
He was born on 29 December 1945. He attended the University of Cape Coast, University of Ghana and the Ghana School of Law.

== Career ==
Malik is a farmer, politician and lawyer. He served as Member of Parliament for Yendi from 1997 until 2009. In parliament, he became the second Deputy Speaker of Parliament.

== Politics ==
He assumed office on the ticket of New Patriotic Party in 2004. He won by attaining 15,302 votes i.e. 53.50% of the total votes cast.

== Politics ==
Malik was a member of parliament for the fourth parliament of the fourth republic of Ghana. He was elected into members of parliament during the 2004 Ghanaian parliamentary elections on the tickets of the New Patriotic Party with a total votes cast of 15,302 representing 53.50% whiles his opponent, Sulemana Ibn Iddrisu Jnr. of the National Democratic Congress polled 10,779 of the total vote cast representing 37.70%, Nalari Nyoja John of the People's National Convention polled 2,500 which also represent 8.70% of the total votes cast and Zuututugri Mubarak Abdallah and independent candidate had no votes of 0 0.00%.

Malik was also a Minister for Interior during the regime of His Excellency the Ex-President of the republic of Ghana John Agyekum Kufour but in the year 2002 he resigned amid accusations of backing one of two feuding clans involved in the fighting in Yendi, a region in the Northern part of Ghana. He was also the Second Deputy Speaker of parliament.

He was elected into the 2nd parliament of the 4th republic of Ghana on 7 January 1997 after being pronounced winner at the 1996 Ghanaian General Elections. He defeated Sulemana Ibn Iddrisu, Jnr. of the National Democratic Congress by obtaining 47.60% of the total valid votes which is equivalent to 13,743 votes while Sulemana obtained 24.60% which is 7,107 votes in equivalence.

Preceded by ?	Member of Pan-African Parliament for Ghana; 2004 – present	Incumbent
Political offices
Preceded by Nii Okaidja Adamafio	Minister for Interior; 2001 – 2002	Succeeded by Hackman Owusu-Agyeman
