= Godfred T. Boyon =

Ghanaian politician

Godfred T. Boyon is a Ghanaian politician.

== Ministerial Positions ==
In the government of President John Kufuor, he was appointed as the Minister of State in the Ministry of Transport on August 1, 2007.
