= Cecilia Bannerman =

Ghanaian politician

- In office Jan 2001 – Jan 2003

Minister for Manpower Development Employment

Minister of Mines between 2003 and 2005.
- In office 2003–2005
- President: John Kufuor

Personal details
- Party: New Patriotic Party

Cecilia Bannerman is a Ghanaian politician and a former Minister of State. She served as the sector minister for Manpower Development and Employment from 2001 to 2003 and Minister of Mines between 2003 and 2005. In 2009 she was appointed to serve as a member of the Council of State.
