= Mogtari Sahanun =

Ghanaian politician

Alhaji Mogtari Sahanun

Ghana Ambassador to Burkina Faso
- In office 2006–2009
- President: John Kufuor

Upper West Regional Minister
- In office 2001–2005

Personal details
- Party: New Patriotic Party

Alhaji Mogtari Sahanun is a Ghanaian politician and a former ambassador to Burkina Faso. From 1992 until 2002 Sahanun served as the Upper West regional secretary. From 2001 to 2005, he rose as the regional minister. From 2006 to 2009 Sahanun was the ambassador to Burkina Faso. He is currently contesting for vice-chairmanship of the New Patriotic Party.
