= Ben Salifu =

Ghanaian politician

Ben Bukari Salifu is a Native of Janga in the North East Region and Ghanaian politician from the New Patriotic Party. He served as Regional Minister for the Northern Region from 14 February to 17 November 2001. Prior to his appointment he recommended splitting the region into two for ease of administration. He was subsequently Minister of State responsible for the National Development Planning Commission.
