= Rawlings government =

This is a listing of the ministers who served in Jerry Rawlings's National Democratic Congress government during the Fourth Republic of Ghana. This started on January 7, 1993, after 11 years of military rule by Rawlings. He retired from the Ghana Armed Forces and served a further two democratically elected terms ending January 7, 2001.

For Rawlings' first military government, see: Armed Forces Revolutionary Council.
For Rawlings' second military government, see: Provisional National Defence Council.

== List of ministers ==
=== List of ministers of state (7 January 1993 - 6 January 1997) ===
| Portfolio | Minister | From | To | Notes |
|---|---|---|---|---|
| President | Jerry Rawlings | 7 January 1993 | 6 January 2001 | |
| Vice President | Kow Nkensen Arkaah | 7 January 1993 | 6 January 1997 | |
| Minister for Foreign Affairs | Obed Asamoah | 1982 | 1997 | |
| Minister for the Interior | Colonel Emmanuel Osei-Wusu | Aug 1992 | Oct 1996 | |
| Minister for the Interior | Mahama Iddrisu | Nov 1996 | Feb 1997 | |
| Minister for Finance and Economic Planning | Kwesi Botchwey | 1982 | Aug 1995 | |
| Minister for Finance and Economic Planning | Richard Kwame Peprah | Aug 1995 | 6 January 2001 | |
| Minister for Defence | Mahama Iddrisu | 7 Jan 1993 | Feb 1999 | |
| Minister for Defence | Lt. Col. E. K. Donkoh | Feb 1999 | 6 January 2001 | |
| Attorney General and Minister for Justice | Anthony Forson | 1 March 1993 | 30 October 1993 | |
| Attorney General and Minister for Justice | Obed Asamoah | August 1994 | 2001 | |
| Minister for Education (later); Minister for Education and Culture | Mary Grant | 1992 | 1993 | |
| Minister for Education (later); Minister for Education and Culture | Harry Sawyerr | 1993 | 1997 | |
| Minister for Education (later); Minister for Education and Culture | Esi Sutherland-Addy | 1997 | ? | |
| Minister for Health | Commodore Stephen Obimpeh | August 1994 | 1996 | |
| Minister for Health | Eunice Brookman-Amissah | 1996 | 1999 | |
| Minister for Local Government and Rural Development | Kwamena Ahwoi | August 1994 | ? | |
| Minister for Local Government and Rural Development | Cecilia Johnson | ? | ? | |
| Minister for Food and Agriculture | Ibrahim Issaka Adam | August 1992 | 1996 | |
| Minister for Food and Agriculture | Commodore Stephen Obimpeh | 1996 | 1997 | |
| Minister for Trade and Industry | Emma Mitchell | ? | Jan 1996 | |
| Minister for Information | Kofi Totobi Quakyi | ? | ? | |
| Minister for Employment and Social Welfare | David Sarpong Boateng | ? | ? | |
| Minister for Transport and Communications | Edward Salia | ? | ? | |
| Minister for Roads and Highways | Ato Quarshie | ? | ? | |
| Minister for Works and Housing | Clend Sowu | | | |
| Minister for Works and Housing | David Amankwah | | | |
| Minister for Works and Housing | Kobina Fosu | | | |
| Minister for Mines and Energy | Richard Kwame Peprah | ? | Aug 1995 | |
| Minister for Mines and Energy | Edward Salia | Aug 1995 | ? | |
| Minister for Environment, Science and Technology | Christine Amoako-Nuamah | ? | ? | |
| Minister for Lands and Forestry | Kwabena Adjei | ? | ? | |
| Minister for Youth and Sports | Enoch Teye Mensah | 1993 | 6 January 2001 | |
| Minister for Parliamentary Affairs | J. H. Owusu Acheampong | ? | ? | |
Regional Ministers
| Ashanti Regional Minister | Daniel Ohene Agyekum | ? | ? | |
| Brong Ahafo Region | I.K. Adjei-Mensah | ? | ? | |
| Central Regional Minister | Ebenezer Kobina Fosu | ? | ? | |
| Eastern Regional Minister | Emmanuel Tetteh | 1996 | 1997 | |
| Eastern Regional Minister | Patience Addo | ? | ? | |
| Greater Accra Regional Minister | Mike Gizo | ? | ? | |
| Northern Regional Minister | Abdulai Ibrahim | ? | ? | |
| Upper East Region | Sherif A. Guma | ? | ? | |
| Upper West Region | Joseph Yieleh Chireh | 1993 | 1997 | |
| Volta Regional Minister | Modestus Ahiable | ? | ? | |
| Western Region | John Frank Abu | ? | ? | |

=== List of ministers of state ( 7 January 1997 - 6 January 2001) ===
| Portfolio | Minister | From | To | Notes |
|---|---|---|---|---|
| President | Jerry Rawlings | 7 January 1993 | 6 January 2001 | |
| Vice President | John Atta-Mills | 7 January 1997 | 6 January 2001 | |
| Minister for Foreign Affairs | Kwamena Ahwoi (acting) | 1997 | ? | |
| Minister for Foreign Affairs | James Victor Gbeho | 1997 | 6 January 2001 | |
| Minister for the Interior | Nii Okaidja Adamafio | February 1997 | 6 January 2001 | |
| Minister for Finance and Economic Planning | Richard Kwame Peprah | 1995 | 6 January 2001 | |
| Minister for Planning and Regional Economic Co-operation and Integration | Kwamena Ahwoi | ? | 6 January 2001 | |
| Minister for Defence | Colonel Enoch K. T. Donkoh | February 1997 | 6 January 2001 | |
| Minister for National Security | Kofi Totobi-Quakyi | 1997 | 6 January 2001 | |
| Attorney General and Minister for Justice | Obed Asamoah | August 1994 | 6 January 2001 | |
| Minister for Education | Christina Amoako-Nuamah | ? | ? | |
| Minister for Education | Ekwow Spio-Garbrah | ? | 6 January 2001 | |
| Minister for Health | Eunice Brookman-Amissah | 1996 | 1998 | |
| Minister for Health | Samuel Nuamah-Donkor | 1998 | February 2000 | |
| Minister for Health | Kwaku Danso-Boafo | February 2000 | January 2001 | |
| Minister for Local Government and Rural Development | Kwamena Ahwoi | 1997 | ? | |
| Minister for Local Government and Rural Development | Cecilia Johnson | ? | January 2001 | |
| Minister for Food and Agriculture | Kwabena Agyei (MP) | 1997 | 1998 | |
| Minister for Food and Agriculture | J. H. Owusu Acheampong (MP) | 1998 | January 2001 | |
| Minister for Trade and Industry | John Frank Abu | ? | ? | |
| Minister for Trade and Industry | Dan Abodakpi | ? | January 2001 | |
| Minister for Information | Kofi Totobi Quakyi | ? | January 2001 | |
| Minister for Employment and Social Welfare | Muhammad Mumuni | ? | January 2001 | |
| Minister for Roads and Transport | Edward Salia | ? | January 2001 | |
| Minister for Communications | Ekwow Spio-Garbrah | ? | 1998 | |
| Minister for Communications | John Mahama | 1998 | 6 January 2001 | |
| Minister for Works and Housing | Isaac K. Adjei-Mensah | ? | ? | |
| Minister for Mines and Energy | Fred Ohene-Kena | 1999 | ? | |
| Minister for Mines and Energy | John Frank Abu | ? | ? | |
| Minister for Environment, Science and Technology | Cletus Avoka | ? | January 2001 | |
| Minister for Lands and Forestry | Christina Amoako-Nuama | ? | January 2001 | |
| Minister for Youth and Rural Development | E. K. Andah | ? | ? | |
| Minister for Youth and Sports | Enoch Teye Mensah | 1998 | January 2001 | |
| Minister for Tourism | Vida Amaadi Yeboah | ? | ? | |
| Minister for Tourism | Mike Gizo | ? | January 2001 | |
| Minister for Parliamentary Affairs | Kwabena Adjei | ? | 2001 | |
| Minister for Chieftaincy Affairs and State Protocol | Daniel Ohene Agyekum | January 2000 | January 2001 | |
Regional Ministers
| Ashanti Regional Minister | Kojo Yankah | ? | 1999 | |
| Ashanti Regional Minister | Samuel Nuamah-Donkor | 1999 | ? | |
| Brong Ahafo Region | David Osei-Wusu | ? | ? | |
| Central Regional Minister | Kojo Yankah | 1997 | ? | |
| Central Regional Minister | Jacob Arthur | ? | ? | |
| Eastern Regional Minister | Patience Addo | ? | ? | |
| Greater Accra Regional Minister | Joshua Alabi | ? | ? | |
| Northern Regional Minister | Seidu Iddi | ? | ? | |
| Upper East Region | Donald Adabre | ? | ? | |
| Upper West Region | Amidu Sulemana | ? | ? | |
| Volta Regional Minister | Lt. Col. Charles K. Agbenaza | ? | ? | |
| Western Region | Esther Lily Nkansah | ? | ? | |

== See also ==
- National Democratic Congress

| Preceded by Provisional National Defence Council (1981-1993) | Government of Ghana; 1993 – 2001 | Succeeded by Kufuor government (2001-2009) |
