= Sekondi College =

Secondary school in Sekondi, Ghana

Sekondi College is a co-educational second cycle school in Sekondi in the Western Region of Ghana. It has a science and computer laboratories and other facilities.Its current location is in Inchaban, a suburb of Sekondi

== History ==
It was founded in the year 1951 by Mr. Joseph w. Acquah at Essaman Ekuasi.

== Anthem ==
Below is the anthem of Sekondi College

Arise all ye of Afric’s birth

Whose heritage doth envy scythe

Sing ye the joy of Sekco dear

Pay ye your vows your loyalty

Chorus

Hail boys (Hail boys)

Cheer girls (Cheer girls)

For our mother Sekco dear

All generations yet to come

Shall by your labours judge you right

If good they’ll say and praises give

If not they’ll censure and condemn

Tis yours to save ye gallant youth

Tis yours to cheer oh pretty maids

If Sekco dear should ever stand

For liberty for hope for you

Our Father God which at in Heaven

Oh! Come our aid our school to bless

Inspire us with Thy spirit bold

That we may live in godliness.

== Notable staff ==
One of its staff, S. K. Riley-Poku, who was headmaster of the school between 1966 and 1969 later became the Minister for Defence in the Limann government between 1979 and 1981.

== Notable alumni ==
- Kweku Tawiah Ackaah-Boafo - active justice of the Supreme Court of Ghana (2025–)
- Anthony Benin - active justice of the Supreme Court of Ghana (2012–)
- Nana Ato Dadzie - Chief of Staff of Ghana Jerry Rawlings Administration (1997 – 2001)
- Prof Kwabena Frimpong-Boateng - first black person to perform open heart surgery
- Kofi Koduah Sarpong - Ghanaian administrator and CEO of Ghana National Petroleum Corporation
