= Dixon Kwame Afreh =

Ghanaian lawyer, academic and judge

Dixon Kwame Afreh JSC

Justice of the Supreme Court of Ghana
- In office 19 March 2002 – September 2003
- Appointed by: John Kufuor

Commissioner for Information and Cocoa Affairs
- In office June 1979 – September 1979
- Preceded by: Parker H.S. Yarney
- Succeeded by: Yaw O. Afriyie

Personal details
- Born: 25 March 1933 Kumasi, Ghana
- Died: 17 February 2004 (aged 70) Accra, Ghana
- Resting place: Barekese, Ghana
- Party: Justice Party
- Spouse: Rosalind
- Children: 5
- Education: Achimota School; University of Birmingham; University of London
- Profession: Judge, Lecturer

Dixon Kwame Afreh JSC (1933 – 2004) was a Ghanaian judge, academic and a former Deputy Electoral Commissioner.

== Early life and education ==
Afreh's secondary education was at the Achimota School in Ghana between 1949 and 1954. He then studied law at the University of Birmingham, United Kingdom, completing in July 1958. He also studied for a Masters in Law at the University of London from October 1958 to October 1960.

== Career ==
Kwame Afreh was called to the bar at Lincoln's Inn, London in February 1960. He returned to Ghana after his studies and worked in various capacities.

=== Academic work ===
Kwame Afreh joined the University of Ghana and was a lecturer with the Faculty of Law between 1962 and 1975. He became a Senior Lecturer at the Law Department as well as the Acting Dean of the Faculty of Law. He was also the Master of Commonwealth Hall at the same university. During his vetting leading to his appointment to the Supreme Court of Ghana, he listed John Atta Mills, a former President of Ghana and law lecturer, Kwamena Ahwoi, also a former law lecturer as well as former Minister for Foreign Affairs in the Rawlings government as his former law students. The list also included some of the judges already on the Supreme Court.

=== Legal work ===
From 1975 until 1978, he was a Chief State Attorney at the Attorney General's Department in Accra. He was also the Director of Legal Education at the General Legal Council between April 1973 and June 1980. In June 1994, He was appointed a Justice of the Court of Appeal of Ghana. Afreh was appointed as a Supreme Court Judge by John Kufuor, President of Ghana in March 2002. He presided over the Fast Track Court which sentenced two former ministers, Kwame Peprah, former Minister for Finance, Ibrahim Adam, Former Minister of Food and Agriculture and George Yankey, a former Director of Legal Sector, Private and Financial Institutions of the Ministry of Finance to two years imprisonment in April 2003.

=== Other work ===
Afreh became Head of Administration and later Financial Controller at the Pan-African News Agency in Dakar, Senegal between June 1981 and October 1992. He was also Deputy Electoral Commissioner of the Electoral Commission of Ghana from 1992 to 1994. He returned to legal work following this appointment. He was the Commissioner for Information and Cocoa Affairs under the Armed Forces Revolutionary Council in 1979.

== Politics ==
During the second republic of Ghana, Afreh served as Deputy General Secretary of the Justice Party.

== Death ==
Kwame Afreh died at the Korle-Bu Teaching Hospital following an illness. He was buried in his hometown of Barekese in the Ashanti Region of Ghana.

== See also ==
- Supreme Court of Ghana
- List of judges of the Supreme Court of Ghana
- Electoral Commission of Ghana
