= Nana Ato Dadzie =

Ghanaian lawyer and politician

Chief of Staff of Ghana
- In office 6 January 1997 – 7 January 2001
- President: Jerry John Rawlings
- Succeeded by: Kwadwo Mpiani

Personal details
- Party: National Democratic Congress
- Children: 3
- Education: Adisadel College; Sekondi College
- Alma mater: University of Ghana; Ghana School of Law
- Occupation: Consultant on political transitions
- Profession: Lawyer

Nana Ato Dadzie is a Ghanaian lawyer and politician who served as Chief of Staff during the Jerry John Rawlings administration from 1997 to 2001. He is an expert and a United Nations consultant on peace building and political transitions.

== Education ==
Dadzie had his ordinary certificate education from 1963 to 1968 from Adisadel College, Cape Coast and further went to Sekondi College in the Western Region from 1968 to 1970 for his advanced level certificate education. Dadzie holds a Bachelor of law degree (LLB) from the University of Ghana, Legon. He had his Professional Certificate to practice law from the Ghana School of Law and was called to Bar in 1975 along with Ghanaian lawyers Tsatsu Tsikata and Nana Akufo-Addo.

== Political career ==
Dadzie is a member of the National Democratic Congress. He served briefly as the PNDC Secretary of state, equivalent to minister, for the Central Region in 1983. From 1983 to 2001, Dadzie served as a Presidential Advisor with cabinet status to Jerry John Rawlings. He served as PNDC secretary automatically making him the Secretary to the Government of Ghana from 1983 to 1993 and continued to serve as a Secretary and Special Assistant to Jerry John Rawlings when he constituted his first government during the 4th Republic from 1993 to 1997. He was later appointed as chief of staff with cabinet status in the second government, serving in that capacity from 1997 to 2001 when Jerry John Rawlings left office as president.

In his role as Chief of staff he served as the Coordinator for the historic visit of US President Bill Clinton to Ghana in 1998.

== Author ==
He is a writer and has written publications on law and political transitions. Dadzie and Kwamena Ahwoi, co-authored the book, ‘In the Service of Democracy: Biography of the Right Honourable Justice Daniel Francis Annan, Speaker of the First and Second Parliaments of the Fourth Republic of Ghana''

== Personal life ==
Dadzie is married with 3 children.
