= Peprah =

Peprah is a surname. Notable people with the surname include

- Charlie Peprah (born 1983), American football player
- Richard Kwame Peprah, Ghanaian politician
