= Cornelius Dartey Tay =

Ghanaian politician and civil servant

Cornelius Dartey Tay was a Ghanaian politician and civil servant. He was a member of parliament for the Anlo South Constituency from 1962 to 1965 and the Anlo Constituency in the Volta Region of Ghana from 1965 to 1966.

Prior to entering parliament, he was the Senior Assistant Secretary at the Ministry of Foreign Affairs.
