= Ato Ahwoi =

Ghanaian politician

Personal details
- Party: National Democratic Congress
- Relations: Kwamena Ahwoi (brother); Kwesi Ahwoi (brother)

Ato Ahwoi is a Ghanaian politician, who served as board chairman of the Ghana National Petroleum Corporation from 2009 to 2013 in the National Democratic Congress (NDC) government, during the government of John Atta Mills and as Minister of Energy from 1987 to 1993 during the government of Jerry Rawlings within the PNDC era.

== Personal life ==
He has eight siblings. He attended Prempeh College. He has two brothers, Kwamena Ahwoi and Kwesi Ahwoi, who both served along with him in the Rawlings government.
