= Richard Kwame Sefe =

Ghanaian politician

Honourable Richard Kwame Sefe
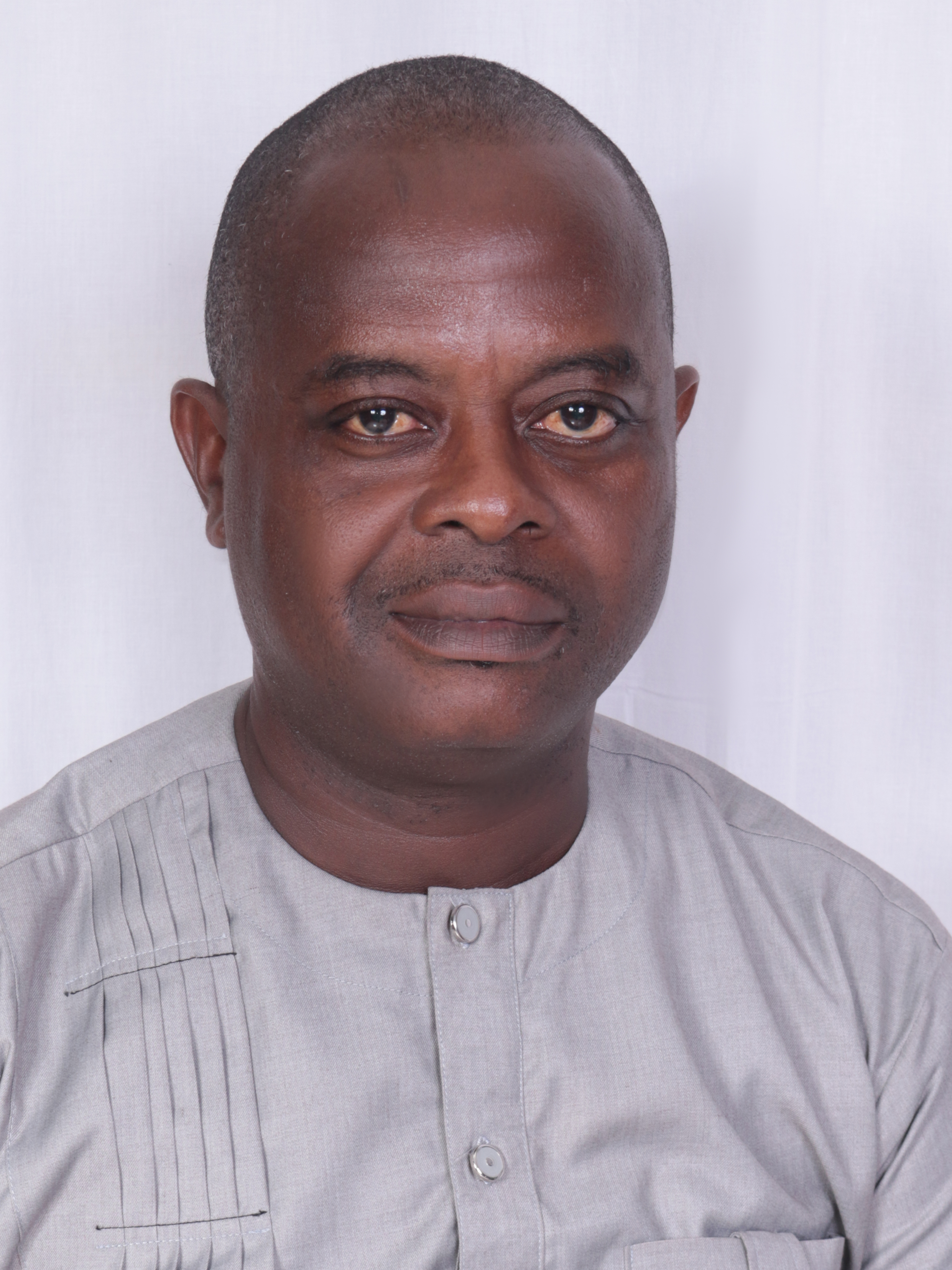

Member of the Ghana Parliament for Anlo
- Incumbent
- Assumed office 7 January 2021
- Preceded by: Clement Kofi Humado
- Majority: 32,920

Personal details
- Born: October 11, 1972 (age 54)
- Party: National Democratic Congress
- Profession: politician
- Website: www.facebook.com/kwamesefe/

Richard Kwame Sefe (born 11 October 1972) is a Ghanaian politician and member of the National Democratic Congress. He is the member of parliament for the Anlo Constituency, in the Volta Region of Ghana.

== Elections ==
In the 2020 Ghanaian general election, he contested the seat as the National Democratic Congress candidate and won with a majority of 32,920 votes. He replaced Clement Kofi Humado who had been the MP from January 2005.

== Philanthropy ==
In September 2021, Richard presented some teaching and learning materials to basic schools in Anloga in the Volta Region of Ghana.

Parliament of Ghana
Preceded by Clement Kofi Humado	Member of Parliament for Anlo; 2021–present	Incumbent
