= Minister for Information (Ghana) =

Ministerial portfolio

The Minister for Information in Ghana usually heads the Ministry of Information. This position has existed in various configurations until the cabinet reshuffle of 16 July 2014 when President Mahama merged the functions of this ministry into that of the Ministry of Communications with the Minister of Communications having oversight for both Information as well as Communications. On 16 July 2014, Mahama had another cabinet reshuffle involving a lot of ministries.

== List of ministers ==
| Number | Minister | Took office | Left office | Government | Party |
|---|---|---|---|---|---|
| 1 | | 6 March 1957 | | Nkrumah government | Convention People's Party |
| 2 | Kwaku Boateng (MP) | | | Nkrumah government | Convention People's Party |
| 3 | Tawia Adamafio (MP) | 1960 | 1962 | Nkrumah government | Convention People's Party |
| 4 | Imoru Egala (MP) | 1962 | | Nkrumah government | Convention People's Party |
| 5 | | | | National Liberation Council | Military government |
| 6 | T.D. Brodie Mends (MP) | 1 October 1969 | 27 January 1971 | Busia government | Progress Party |
| 7 | Major Anthony Selormey | 1972 | May 1972 | National Redemption Council | Military government |
| 8 | Colonel I. K. Acheampong | | | National Redemption Council | Military government |
| 8 | Colonel C. R. Tachie-Menson | | | National Redemption Council | Military government |
| 9 | Major General Robert Kotei | | | Supreme Military Council | Military government |
| 10 | Colonel Parker H.S. Yarney | | | Supreme Military Council | Military government |
| 11 | Dixon Kwame Afreh {Commissioner for Information and Cocoa Affairs} | | | Armed Forces Revolutionary Council | Military government |
| 12 | Yaw O. Afriyie; John S. Nabila {Minister for Information and Tourism} | 1979 | 1980 | Limann government | People's National Party |
| 13 | Joyce Aryee | 1982 | 1985 | Provisional National Defence Council | Military government |
| 14 | Kofi Totobi Quakyi | 1985 | 1993 | Provisional National Defence Council | Military government |
| 14 | Kofi Totobi Quakyi | 1993 | 2001 | Rawlings government | National Democratic Congress |
| 15 | Jake Obetsebi-Lamptey | 2001 | 2003 | Kufuor government | New Patriotic Party |
| 16 | Nana Akomea (MP) | 2003 | 2005 | Kufuor government | New Patriotic Party |
| 17 | Daniel Kwaku Botwe | 2005 | 2006 | Kufuor government | New Patriotic Party |
| 18 | Kwamena Bartels (MP) | 2006 | 2007 | Kufuor government | New Patriotic Party |
| 19 | Florence Oboshie Sai-Cofie | 2007 | 2008 | Kufuor government | New Patriotic Party |
| 20 | Stephen Asamoah Boateng | 2008 | 2009 | Kufuor government | New Patriotic Party |
| 21 | Zita Okaikoi | 2009 | 2010 | Mills government | National Democratic Congress |
| 22 | John Tia (MP) | 2010 | 2012 | Mills government | National Democratic Congress |
| 23 | Fritz Baffour (MP) | 2012 | 2012 | Mills government | National Democratic Congress |
| 23 | Fritz Baffour (MP) | 2012 | 2013 | Mahama government | National Democratic Congress |
| 24 | Mahama Ayariga (MP) | 30 January 2013 | 16 July 2014 | Mahama government | National Democratic Congress |
| 25 | Mustapha Abdul-Hamid | February 2017 | August 2018 | Akuffo-Addo government | New Patriotic Party |
| 26 | Kojo Oppong Nkrumah (MP) | August 2018 | February 2024 | Akuffo-Addo government | New Patriotic Party |
| 27 | Fatimatu Abubakar | February 2024 | Incumbent | Akuffo-Addo government | New Patriotic Party |
