= Kwabena Adjei =

Ghanaian politician (1943–2019)

Hon. Kwabena Adjei

Member of Parliament for Biakoye Constituency
- In office 7 January 1993 – 6 January 2005
- Preceded by: Parliament suspended
- Succeeded by: Emmanuel Kwasi Bandua

Minister for Food and Agriculture
- In office 1997–1998
- President: Jerry Rawlings
- Preceded by: Steve Obimpeh
- Succeeded by: J. H. Owusu Acheampong

Minister for Lands and Forestry
- In office 1996–1997
- President: Jerry Rawlings
- Succeeded by: Christine Amoako-Nuamah

Minister for Parliamentary Affairs
- In office 1998–2001
- President: Jerry Rawlings

Personal details
- Born: 9 March 1943
- Died: 12 March 2019 (aged 76) Acdra
- Party: National Democratic Congress
- Education: University of Ghana, University of Strathclyde
- Profession: Educationist

Dr. Kwabena Adjei (9 March 1943 – 12 March 2019), sometimes referred to as Nkonya Terminator was a Member of Parliament for the Biakoye Constituency in the Oti region of Ghana. He was also the former chairman of the National Democratic Congress.

== Early life and education ==
Kwabena Adjei was born on 9 March 1943 at Nkonya Ntsumuru in the Oti region. He attended the University of Ghana, Legon and graduated with a Bachelor of Arts (Hons) Psychology in 1970. In 1973 and 1978, he had his Doctor of Philosophy (Research Methods & Statistics in Psychology) and Master of Business Administration from the University of Strathclyde and University of Ghana respectively.

== Politics ==
Kwabena was a key founding member of the National Democratic Congress. He represented Biakoye Constituency in the 1st, 2nd and 3rd Parliament of the 4th Republic of Ghana.

He was elected into the first parliament of the fourth republic of Ghana on 7 January 1993 after he was pronounced winner at the 1992 Ghanaian parliamentary election held on 29 December 1992.

He served as Minister for Lands & Forestry, Food & Agriculture and Parliamentary Affairs under presidency of J.J Rawlings. He was elected Chairman of the National Democratic Congress in 2005, he succeeded Obed Asamoah.

== Career ==
He was an Educationist. He taught psychology and sociology in University of Ghana, University of Cape Coast, University of Maiduguri.

== Elections ==
Adjei was first elected into Parliament during the 1996 Ghanaian General Elections, he polled 20,740 votes out of the 26,564 valid votes cast representing 63.90% over Abotsina Festus Andrews of the New Patriotic Party, Alexander Kwame Mensah of the Democratic People's Party, Christiana Amaa Pokuah Nyark of the Convention People's Party and George k. Afari of the people's National Convention who polled 1,903 votes, 1,897 votes, 1,706 votes and 348 votes respectively.

He was elected again as the Member of Parliament for the Biakoye constituency in the 2000 Ghanaian general elections. He won the elections. His constituency was a part of the 17 parliamentary seats out of 19 seats won by the National Democratic Congress in that election for the Volta Region.

The National Democratic Congress won a minority total of 92 parliamentary seats out of 200 seats in the 3rd parliament of the 4th republic of Ghana. He was elected with 15,036 votes out of 22,042 total valid votes cast.

This was equivalent to 69% of the total valid votes cast. He was elected over Edward C. Boateng of the New Patriotic Party, William K. Semanhyia of the National Reformed Party, Christian O. Nyarko of the Convention People's Party and Atsu N. Missiahyia of the United Ghana Movement. These obtained 4,108, 1,674, 751 and 210 votes respectively out of the total valid votes cast. These were equivalent to 18.9%, 7.7%, 3.4% and 1% respectively of total valid votes cast.

== Death ==
Adjei died on 12 March 2019 at the Regional Hospital in Accra.
