= Kwesi Ahwoi =

Ghanaian politician

Hon. Kwesi Ahwoi
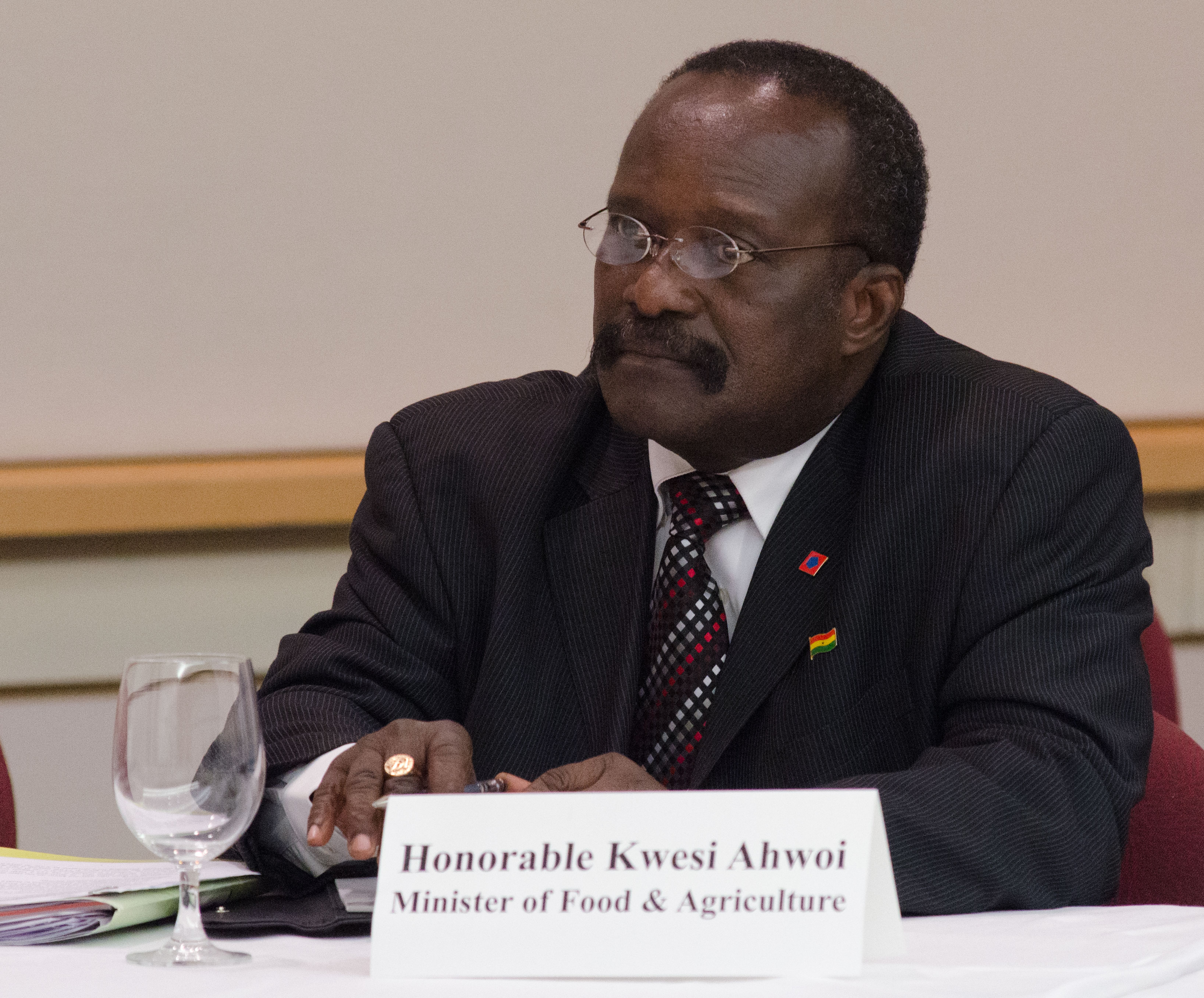

34th Minister for the Interior (Ghana)
- In office February 2013 – 16 July 2014
- President: John Dramani Mahama
- Preceded by: William Kwasi Aboah
- Succeeded by: Mark Woyongo

30th Minister for Food and Agriculture (Ghana)
- In office February 2009 – January 2013
- President: John Atta Mills
- Preceded by: Ernest Debrah
- Succeeded by: Clement Kofi Humado

Personal details
- Born: 17 November 1946 (age 79)
- Party: National Democratic Congress
- Relations: Kwamena Ahwoi; Ato Ahwoi
- Children: 7
- Education: University of Cape Coast (B.A.); University of Maryland

Kwesi Ahwoi (born 17 November 1946) is a former Minister for the Interior of Ghana. In 2015, he became the first Ghanaian ambassador to Comoros, he also doubles as the ambassador of Ghana in 4 other countries; Lesotho, Mauritius, Seychelles and Swaziland.

== Early life and education ==
Kwesi Ahwoi attended Prempeh College at Kumasi where he obtained his GCE Ordinary Level in 1965. His sixth form education was at St. Augustine's College (Cape Coast) where he passed the GCE Advanced Level in 1967. His undergraduate education was at the University of Cape Coast where he obtained the Bachelor of Arts in Economics, Geography and Education. Between 1980 and 1981, he studied for the Post Graduate Certificates in Budgeting and Financial Management and from the Ghana Institute of Management and Public Administration. During 1985 and 1986, he studied for the Postgraduate Certificate in Planning and Resource Management at the University of Maryland, College Park, United States.

== Career ==
Ahwoi has held various positions in government and business. He was the chief executive officer of the Ghana Investment Promotion Centre during the Rawlings era. Following the December 2008 presidential election, he was appointed Minister for Food and Agriculture by President John Atta Mills. In January 2013, Ahwoi was appointed Minister for the Interior of Ghana by President John Dramani Mahama. He held that position until 16 July 2014.

== Personal life ==
Kwesi Ahwoi is married with seven children. Kwamena Ahwoi and Ato Ahwoi, both brothers of Kwesi served in the Rawlings government.

== See also ==
- List of Mahama government ministers
- List of Mills government ministers

== External links and sources ==
- Profile on Ghana government website

Political offices
Preceded by William Kwasi Aboah	Minister for the Interior; 2013 – 2014	Succeeded by Mark Woyongo
Preceded by Ernest Debrah	Minister for Food and Agriculture; 2009 – 2013	Succeeded by Clement Kofi Humado
