= Kwesi Botchwey =

Ghanaian academic and politician (1944–2022)

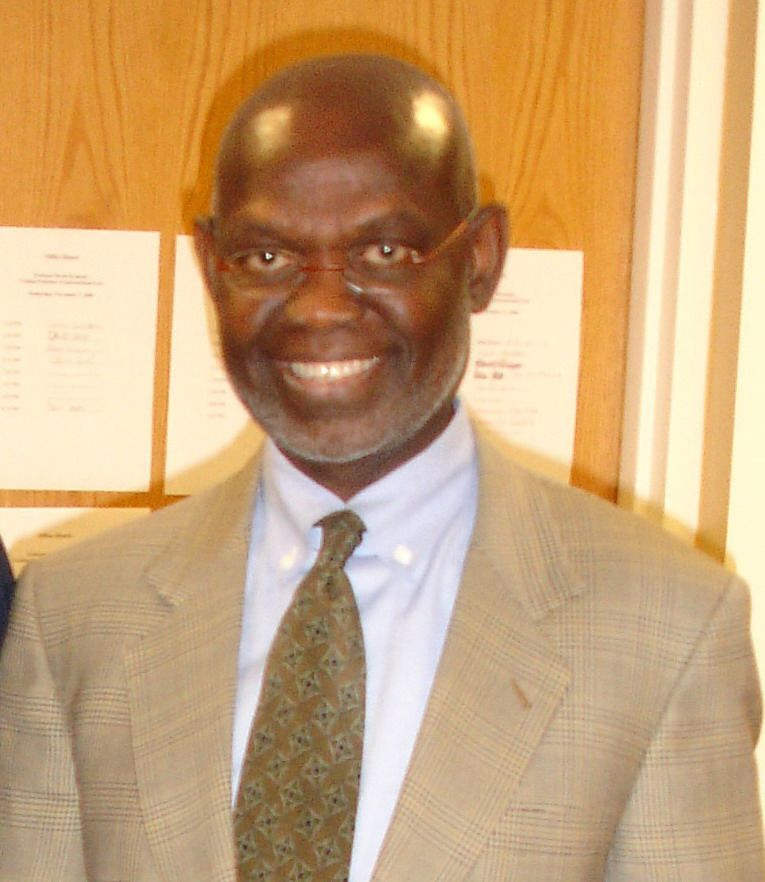

Minister for Finance and Economic Planning
- In office 1982–1995
- President: Jerry Rawlings
- Deputy: Kwesi Amissah-Arthur
- Preceded by: George Benneh
- Succeeded by: Richard Kwame Peprah

Personal details
- Born: 3 September 1942 Gold Coast
- Died: 19 November 2022 (aged 80) Accra, Ghana
- Party: National Democratic Congress
- Education: University of Ghana; Yale University; University of Michigan; Presbyterian Boys' Senior High School
- Occupation: Academic, economist, politician
- Profession: Lawyer

Kwesi Botchwey (13 September 1942 – 19 November 2022) was a Ghanaian government official and Professor of Practice in Development Economics at The Fletcher School of Law and Diplomacy of Tufts University.

Botchwey was Minister for Finance and Economic Planning from 1982 to 1995. He was appointed by Jerry Rawlings to assist in stabilizing Ghana's collapsed economy.

== Education ==
Botchwey received his secondary school education at the Presbyterian Boys' Senior High School and attended St. Augustine's College. Botchwey held an LL.B. from the University of Ghana, a LL.M from Yale Law School, and a doctorate from the University of Michigan Law School. He taught at the University of Zambia, the University of Dar es Salaam (Tanzania) and the University of Ghana.

== Other notable previous assignments ==
- Advisor to the World Bank on the 1997 World Development Report
- Member and Chairman of IMF's Group of Independent Experts who conducted the first ever external evaluation of the Enhanced Structural Adjustment Facility
- Advisor to the UNDP's UN Special Initiative on Africa
- Advisor to the European Centre for Development Policy Management (ECDPM)

== Publications ==
- Transforming the Periphery: A study of the struggle of social forces in Ghana for democracy and national sovereignty, United Nations, 1981 (ISBN 92-808-0309-3; ISSN 0379-5772), DSDRSCA-83/UNUO-309
- "Obstacles to Centralized Reform: An African Perspective" in Laura Wallace (ed.), Deepening Structural Reform in Africa, Lessons from East Asia, Washington, DC: International Monetary Fund, 1996.
- Implementing Debt Relief for the HIPCs (co-author), Center for International Development, Harvard (1999).
- "Whither the Partnership Agenda in Development Cooperation: A Country perspective", 4th Conference on Evaluation and Development, World Bank (2001)
- "The New Partnership for Africa's Economic Development: Internal and External Visions", NEPAD: Internal and External Visions and Influences (2003)

== Later and past projects ==
Member and Convener Team of academics from Yale, Oxford, and the Free University of Amsterdam that conducted and has finished the first External evaluation at the request of the Executive Board of the IMF, of the Fund's Enhanced Structural Adjustment Facility (ESAF)

Member Commonwealth Group of Eminent Persons for the Facilitation of the Signing of the Uruguay Round of Gatt Negotiations.

Member OECD group of high-level experts for the review of the OECD study on "Globalization and Linkages to 2020: Challenges and Opportunities for OECD countries (1996).

Member Commonwealth Expert Group on Good Governance and the Elimination of Corruption in Economic Management

Member Panel of High Level Personalities on African Development – an advisory group established to assist the UN Secretary-General in advocating greater support for African development and in coordinating the UN system's activities in the region.

Board Chairman for Heritage bank Ghana.

== Papers and speeches given at conferences ==
- "HIV/AIDS and Economic Development in Africa", Theme Paper, African Development Forum, Economic Commission For Africa, December 2000.
- "Magnitude and Drivers of the Brain Drain in Africa", Keynote Address at the 1999 Africa Business Conference, Harvard University, 30 January 1999.
- "Growth and Poverty Alleviation in Africa", ODC Conference on African Economic Recovery, 1996.
- "Deepening Structural Adjustment Reforms and Policies for Growth in Africa", May 1996.
- "Growth and Poverty Alleviation", ODC Conference on African Economic Recovery, 11–12 June 1996.
- "Globalization: What has it meant for Africa and what does the future portend?" Presented at the Seminar on International Solidarity and Globalization: In Search of New Strategies, Stockholm, 1997.
- "The Role of the State, the Ministry of Finance and the Treasury Secretary in the context of Economic Liberalization and Globalization", Abidjan, June 1998.
- "The Politics of Administrative Reform", World Bank, June 1998.
- "Mobilizing capital flows in support of accelerated African development - the role of capital markets", Washington, DC, July 1998.

== Death ==
Botchwey died at the Korle-Bu Teaching Hospital on 19 November 2022, at the age of 80.

Political offices
Preceded by Dr. Amon Nikoi	Minister of Finance; 1982 – 1995	Succeeded by Richard Kwame Peprah
