= Clement Kofi Humado =

Ghanaian politician (born 1953)

Hon. Clement Kofi Humado

Member of the Ghanaian Parliament for Anlo
- Incumbent
- Assumed office 6 January 2005
- Preceded by: Victor Gbeho
- Majority: 27,824

Minister for Food and Agriculture
- In office 2013 – 16 July 2014
- President: John Dramani Mahama
- Preceded by: Kwesi Ahwoi
- Succeeded by: Fiifi Fiavi Franklin Kwetey (MP)

Personal details
- Born: 18 December 1953 (age 72)
- Party: National Democratic Congress
- Education: University of Ghana

Clement Kofi Humado (born 18 December 1953) is the Member of Parliament for the Anlo constituency in Ghana. He is also a former Minister for Food and Agriculture in Ghana.

== Early life and education ==
Humado was born to the late John Kobla Humado and his wife Grace Abla Humado. They both hailed from Alakple in the Keta Municipality of the Volta Region of Ghana. He graduated from the University of Ghana at Legon in 1976 where he studied Animal Science and Agricultural Extension. He obtained a Graduate Diploma in Agricultural Administration four years later at the same university. In 1985, he completed a Certificate in Monitoring and Evaluation of Public Sector Projects and Programmes course at the University of East Anglia, Norwich, England. He also did other Certificate coursed in 1989 at the Ghana Institute of Management and Public Administration and in Finance in 1998 at the University of Reading in the United Kingdom.

== Career ==
Humado has worked in various capacities and as a consultant in agriculture and finance in various organisations such as U SAID WEST AFRICA. He was also the Head monitoring and Evaluation Deputy Project manager for International Fund for Agricultural Development from 1991 to 1999. He was also the National Officer for World Food Program from 1990 to 1991.

== Politics ==
He entered politics in 2000 when he joined the Alakple branch of the National Democratic Congress. He won the Anlo parliamentary seat in the December 2004 parliamentary election. He was appointed by President Mills during a cabinet reshuffle in January 2011. He was also appointed the Minister for youth and Sports by former President Atta-Mills. He was the former Minister for Agriculture.

=== 2004 election ===
Humado was first elected as a member of parliament for the Anlo constituency during the 2004 Ghanaian general election with 17,758 votes, representing 52.20% of the total votes.

=== 2008 election ===
Humado contested the Anlo constituency parliamentary seat on the ticket of National Democratic Congress during the 2008 Ghanaian general election and won with 29,185 votes representing 91.87% of the total votes. He was elected over Ahiabor Edward Kofi of the New Patriotic Party, Amelor Godwin Kwashie of the Convention People's Party, Charles Mewueda Tay of the PNC and Seth Raphael Azokpa of the DFP. They obtained 1,361 votes, 813 votes, 263 votes and 147 votes respectively. These is equivalent to 4.28%, 2.56%, 0.83% and 0.46% of the total votes respectively.

==== 2012 election ====
Humado was again elected as a member of parliament for the Anlo constituency on the ticket of the National Democratic Congress during the 2012 Ghanaian general election with 32,654 votes, representing 81.99% of the total votes. He was elected over Makafui Kofi Woanya of the New Patriotic Party who polled 3,599 votes which is equivalent to 9.04%, parliamentary candidate for the IND Gabriel Adzika Tamakloe had 1, 940 votes representing 4.87%, Francis Tamakloe of the Progressive People's Party had 1,543 votes representing 3.87% and the parliamentary candidate for the NDP Etsey Crown Kwashie had 93 votes representing 0.23% of the total votes.

===== 2016 election =====
He contested the Anlo constituency parliamentary seat on the ticket of the National Democratic Congress during the 2016 Ghanaian general election and won with 22,216 votes representing 64.01% of the total votes. He won the election over Francis Tamakloe of the PPP, Kumedzro Gayheart Sena of IND, Eddah Edward Kwadzo of the New Patriotic Party and Kuatsikor Sylvanus George of Convention People's Party. They obtained 6,823 votes, 2,980, 2,451 votes and 235 votes respectively. These is equivalent to 19.66%, 8.59%, 7.06% and 0.68% of the total votes respectively.

== Personal life ==
He is a Christian and worships as a Catholic. He is married with 5 children.

== See also ==
- Anlo (Ghana parliament constituency)
- List of Mills government ministers
- National Democratic Congress

Parliament of Ghana
| Preceded by James Victor Gbeho | MP for Anlo; 2005 — present | Incumbent |
Political offices
| Preceded by Akua Dansua | Minister for Youth and Sports; 2011 — 2013 | Succeeded by Elvis Afriyie Ankrah |
| Preceded by Kwesi Ahwoi | Minister for Food and Agriculture; 2013 — 2014 | Succeeded by Fiifi Fiavi Franklin Kwetey |
