= Anlo (Ghana parliament constituency) =

Constituency in Ghana

- constituency for the Parliament of Ghana
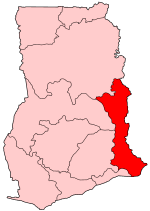
- District: Anloga District
- Region: Volta Region of Ghana

Current constituency
- Party: National Democratic Congress
- MP: Richard Kwame Sefe

Anlo is one of the constituencies represented in the Parliament of Ghana. It elects one Member of Parliament (MP) by the first past the post system of election. Anlo is located in the Keta district of the Volta Region of Ghana.

== Boundaries ==
The seat is located within the Keta District of the Volta Region of Ghana.

== Members of Parliament ==
| First elected | Member | Party |
|---|---|---|
| 1951 | John Quarshie | Convention People's Party |
| 1954 | Komla Agbeli Gbedemah | Convention People's Party |
| 1956 | Split into 2, Anlo East and Anlo West constituencies | |
| 1965 | Cornelius Dartey Tay | Convention People's Party |
| 1969 | Richard Tetteh Segla | National Alliance of Liberals |
| 1979 | Hugh C. Tamakloe | United National Convention |
| 1992 | Clend Mawuko Sowu | National Democratic Congress |
| 2000 | James Victor Gbeho | Independent |
| 2004 | Clement Kofi Humado | National Democratic Congress |
| 2020 | Richard Kwame Sefe | National Democratic Congress |

== Elections ==
2024 Ghanaian general election: Anlo
| Party | Candidate | Votes | % | ±% |
|---|---|---|---|---|
| NDC | Richard Kwame Sefe | 36,419 | 89.81 | +2.84 |
| NPP | Seth Kwashie Yormewu | 4,131 | 10.19 | −2.84 |
| Majority | | 32,288 | 79.62 | +5.68 |
| Turnout | | 40,898 | — | — |
| Registered electors | | — | | — |

2020 Ghanaian general election:Anlo
| Party | Candidate | Votes | % | ±% |
|---|---|---|---|---|
| NDC | Richard Kwame Sefe | 38,722 | 86.97 | +22.96 |
| NPP | Seth Kwashie Yormewu | 5,802 | 13.03 | — |
| Majority | | 32,920 | 73.94 | +29.59 |
| Turnout | | | | |
| Registered electors | | 54,695 | | |

2016 Ghanaian general election: Anlo
| Party | Candidate | Votes | % | ±% |
|---|---|---|---|---|
| NDC | Clement Kofi Humado | 22,216 | 64.01 | −17.98 |
| PPP | Francis Tamakloe | 6,823 | 19.66 | +15.79 |
| Independent | Kumedzro Gayheart Sena | 2,980 | 8.59 | |
| Independent | Eddah Edward Kwadzo | 2,451 | 7.06 | |
| CPP | Kuatsikor Sylvanus George | 235 | 0.68 | |
| Majority | | 15,393 | 44.35 | |
| Turnout | | 35,271 | 63.23 | −15.92 |
| Registered electors | | 55,782 | | |

2012 Ghanaian parliamentary election: Anlo
| Party | Candidate | Votes | % | ±% |
|---|---|---|---|---|
| NDC | Clement Kofi Humado | 32,654 | 81.99 | −9.91 |
| NPP | Makafui Kofi Woanya | 3,599 | 9.04 | +4.74 |
| Independent | Gabriel Adzika Tamakloe | 1,940 | 4.87 | |
| PPP | Francis Tamakloe | 1,543 | 3.87 | |
| NDP | Etsey Crown Kwashie | 93 | 0.23 | |
| Majority | | 29,055 | | |
| Turnout | | 39,829 | 79.15 | +10.22 |
| Registered electors | | 50,319 | | |

2008 Ghanaian parliamentary election: Anlo
| Party | Candidate | Votes | % | ±% |
|---|---|---|---|---|
| NDC | Clement Kofi Humado | 29,185 | 91.9 | +39.7 |
| NPP | Edward Kofi Ahiabor | 1,361 | 4.3 | 0.0 |
| CPP | Godwin Kwashie Amelor | 813 | 2.6 | +2.2 |
| People's National Convention | Charles Mawuena Tay | 263 | 0.8 | +0.6 |
| DFP | Seth Raphael Adzokpa | 147 | 0.5 | — |
| Majority | | 27,824 | 87.6 | −2.6 |
| Turnout | | 32,158 | 68.93 | −21.27 |
| Registered electors | | 46,653 | | |

2004 Ghanaian parliamentary election:Anlo
| Party | Candidate | Votes | % | ±% |
|---|---|---|---|---|
| NDC | Clement Kofi Humado | 17,758 | 52.2 | +37.1 |
| Independent (political) | James Victor Gbeho | 14,089 | 41.4 | −26.8 |
| NPP | Edward kofi Ahiabor | 1,869 | 5.5 | +4.3 |
| CPP | Godwin Kwashie Amelor | 120 | 0.4 | −0.5 |
| EGLE | Siva Vordzorgbe | 87 | 0.3 | — |
| People's National Convention | Kudjo Djadu Campbell | 81 | 0.2 | — |
| Majority | | 3,669 | 11.1 | |
| Turnout | | 34,541 | 90.2 | −42.0 |
| Registered electors | | 38,305 | | |

2000 Ghanaian parliamentary election:Anlo
| Party | Candidate | Votes | % | ±% |
|---|---|---|---|---|
| Independent (political) | James Victor Gbeho | 19,083 | 68.2 | — |
| NDC | Clend M. Kwasi Sowu | 4,223 | 15.1 | −81.8 |
| Independent (political) | Esther Ilan A Nyamalor | 3,800 | 13.6 | — |
| NPP | Godwin Kwaku Defeamekpor | 327 | 1.2 | −0.2 |
| CPP | Clemence Kwami Abotsi | 249 | 0.9 | — |
| National Reform Party | Cornelius Kofi Binewoatsor | 162 | 0.6 | — |
| United Ghana Movement | Prince Richard Abotsi | 118 | 0.4 | — |
| Majority | | 14,860 | 53.1 | −42.1 |
| Turnout | | 28,156 | 61.98 | |
| Registered electors | | 45,429 | | |

1996 Ghanaian parliamentary election:Anlo
| Party | Candidate | Votes | % | ±% |
|---|---|---|---|---|
| NDC | Clend M. Kwasi Sowu | 36,479 | 96.9 | — |
| Independent (political) | Clemence Kwami Abotsi | 630 | 1.7 | — |
| NPP | Felix Yao Tettey | 537 | 1.4 | — |
| Independent | Napoleon Agobada | 0 | 0.0 | — |
| Majority | | 35,849 | 95.2 | — |
| Turnout | | 38,004 | 91.10 | |
| Registered electors | | 41,719 | | |

1992 Ghanaian parliamentary election: Anlo
| Party | Candidate | Votes | % | ±% |
|---|---|---|---|---|
| NCP | Clend Mawuko Kwasi Sowu | | | — |
| Majority | | | | — |
| Turnout | | 20,163 | 54.9 | — |
| Registered electors | | | | |

== See also ==
- List of Ghana Parliament constituencies
