= Mahama Iddrisu =

Ghanaian politician

Alhaji Mahama Iddrisu

Minister for Defence
- In office January 1993 – February 1999
- President: Jerry Rawlings
- Preceded by: Himself
- Succeeded by: Lt. Col. E. K. T. Donkoh

Minister for Interior
- In office 1 November 1996 – 20 February 1997
- President: Jerry Rawlings
- Preceded by: E. M. Osei-Wusu
- Succeeded by: Nii Okaidja Adamafio

Secretary for Defence
- In office 1985 – January 1993
- President: Jerry John Rawlings; Chairman of the Provisional National Defence Council
- Preceded by: Rear Adm. Chemogoh Kevin Dzang
- Succeeded by: Nii Okaidja Adamafio

Secretary for Transport and Communications
- In office 1983–1987
- President: Jerry John Rawlings; Chairman of the Provisional National Defence Council
- Succeeded by: Yaw Donkor

Personal details
- Party: National Democratic Congress
- Spouse: Betty Mould-Iddrisu
- Profession: Businessman

Alhaji Mahama Iddrisu is a Ghanaian politician who was a member of the Provisional National Defence Council and a former Minister for Defence. He is a founding member of the National Democratic Congress. He is the longest-serving Minister of Defence of Ghana, serving from 1985 to 1999, for 14 years.

== Early life and education ==
Alhaji Mahama Iddrisu is a native of Wa, the capital town of the Upper West Region of Ghana. He had his secondary school education at Tamale Secondary School, in Tamale in the Northern Region of Ghana.

== Politics ==
Iddrisu was a member of the United National Convention and later also of the All People's Party. He later joined Provisional National Defence Council (PNDC) under the leadership of Jerry John Rawlings who served as the chairman and head of state. Under the PNDC, Iddrisu was the Secretary of Transport and Communications from 1983 to 1987. He also served as the Secretary of Defence from 1985 to 1993 when the council was dissolved.

=== Minister of state ===
When constitutional government was restored in 1993 under the National Democratic Congress, Iddrisu was appointed the Minister of Defence, a position he held until 1999. He also served as Minister of Interior working in that role concurrently with his role as Minister of Defence from November 1996 to February 1997, when he handed over to E.M. Osei-Wusu. In 1999 he was appointed the Presidential Adviser on Governmental Affairs.

=== Presidential Bid ===
Ahead of the 2008 Ghanaian general election, Iddrisu declared his intention and stood for the NDC's presidential elections in 2006, he stood against then former Vice President John Evans Atta Mills, former minister Ekwow Spio-Garbrah and NDC financier Eddie Annan. On 21 December 2006, he lost the elections to the previous flag bearer for the 2000 and 2004 elections, John Evans Atta Mills. Mills won with a majority of 81.4%, or 1,362 votes with Ekwow Spio-Garbrah coming in second with 8.7% (146 votes), he was third with 8.2% (137 votes), and whilst Eddie Annan was fourth with 1.7% (28 votes).

=== National Democratic Congress ===
Iddrisu is a founding member of the National Democratic Congress (NDC) when it was formed in 1992 after the Provisional National Defence Council (PNDC) was dissolved ahead of the country's return to constitutional rule. He has served in several capacities within the party since its inception. In 2002, Iddrisu stood for the chairmanship election to replace Rawlings as head of the opposition National Democratic Congress (NDC), but he lost to former Attorney–General and Minister of Justice, Obed Asamoah by just 2 votes getting 332 against his 334.

==== Council of elders ====
Iddrisu served as the Vice chairman of the council of elders of the NDC over the years, with the party's founder Jerry John Rawlings serving as the chairman. After Rawlings' death in November 2020, he has been serving as the Acting chairman of the council of elders.

== Personal life ==
Iddrisu is the husband of Betty Mould-Iddrisu, a former Minister of Justice under the John Atta Mills administration and a former Minister of Education under the John Dramani Mahama administration. He is also the brother in law of Alex Mould, a former chief executive officer of Ghana National Petroleum Corporation.

== See also ==
- Provisional National Defence Council (PNDC)
- Minister for Defence

Political offices
| Preceded by C. K. Dzang | Secretary for Defence; 1982 – 1983 | Succeeded by E. K. T. Donkoh |
