= Naa Polku Konkuu Chiiri =

Provisional National Defence Council Member
- In office 1982 – August 1984

Secretary for Defence
- In office 1982 – November 1983
- President: Jerry Rawlings
- Preceded by: S. K. Riley-Poku
- Succeeded by: C. K. Dzang

Nandom-Na
- In office ? – 25 August 1984
- Preceded by: Naa C P Imoru
- Succeeded by: Naa Poure Puobe Chiir VII

Personal details
- Died: 25 August 1984 (aged 59–60) Accra
- Resting place: Nandom
- Occupation: Agricultural Specialist Teacher

Naa Polku Konkuu Chiiri was a Ghanaian teacher, traditional leader and politician. He served as a member of the Provisional National Defence Council (PNDC) military government.

== Politics ==
Naa Polku Konkuu Chiiri was appointed as a PNDC member in 1982. He was one of many chiefs to be given political positions under the PNDC. He was later also made the Secretary for Defence between 1982 and 1983.

== Nandom-Na ==
Naa Polku Konkuu Chiiri was the chief or traditional leader of the people of Nandom. His official title was the Nandom-Na. He remained in this capacity until his death in August 1984. He succeeded Naa C. P. Imoru who died in December 1957. His successor was Naa Poure Puobe Chiir VII.

== Occupation ==
Naa Polku Konkuu Chiiri in civil life was an Agricultural Specialist Teacher prior to going into politics.

== Death ==
Naa Polku Konkuu Chiiri died on 25 August 1984 at the age of 60 years in Accra after a short illness. His body was laid in state at the Kwame Nkrumah Conference Centre in Accra. He was buried at Nandom in the Upper West Region of Ghana.

Political offices
Preceded by S. K. Riley-Poku	Secretary for Defence; 1982 – 1983	Succeeded by C. K. Dzang
