= Jirapa (Ghana parliament constituency) =

Constituency in Ghana

- constituency for the Parliament of Ghana
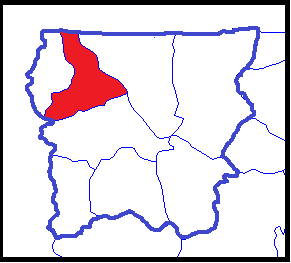
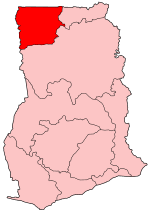
- District: Jirapa Municipal
- Region: Upper West Region of Ghana

Current constituency
- Party: National Democratic Congress
- MP: Cletus Seidu Dapilah

Jirapa is one of the constituencies represented in the Parliament of Ghana. It elects one Member of Parliament (MP) by the first past the post system of election. Jirapa is located in the Jirapa Municipal of the Upper West Region of Ghana.

== Boundaries ==
The seat is located entirely within the jirapa district of the Upper West Region of Ghana.

== Members of Parliament ==
Election	Member	Party
1992	Issah Alhassan	National Convention Party
1996	Francis Gyafiiry Korbieh	National Democratic Congress
2000	Edward Salia	National Democratic Congress
2009	Francis Bawaana Dakurah	National Democratic Congress
2012	Paul Derigubaa	National Democratic Congress
2016	Francis Bawaana Dakurah	National Democratic Congress
2020	Cletus Seidu Dapilah	National Democratic Congress

== Elections ==
2012 Ghanaian general election:Jirapa Source: GhanaWeb
Party	Candidate	Votes	%	±%
Independent	Paul Derigubaa	12,902	48.39	
National Democratic Congress	Francis Bawaana Dakura	11,172	41.9	−37.2
New Patriotic Party	Edward Abu-baka Dombo	8.12	0.8	−19.3
People's National Convention	Fati A. Sadu	139	0.52	
Democratic People's Party	Angsiema Joycelyn	104	0.39	−0.41
National Democratic Party	Callistus Doodaa Tang	92	0.35	
Convention People's Party	Muonaa Elizabeth	87	0.33	
Majority				
Turnout		26,661		

7 April 2009 - Edward Salia NDC died after a period of illness necessitating the by-election. Dr. Francis Bawaana Dakurah of the NDC won the seat with a majority of 9,337 (59.0%) beating the NPP candidate and immediate past District Chief Executive, Justin Bayelah Dakurah to second place.

Jirapa by-election, 2009 Source: Ghana Home Page
Party	Candidate	Votes	%	±%
National Democratic Congress	Francis Bawaana Dakurah	12,518	79.1	14.6
New Patriotic Party	Justin Bayelah Dakurah	3,181	20.1	−12.9
Democratic People's Party	Joycelin Ansiena	127	0.8	0.3
Majority		9,337	50.0	18.5
Turnout				

2008 Ghanaian parliamentary election: Jirapa Source:Ghana Home Page
Party	Candidate	Votes	%	±%
National Democratic Congress	Edward Kojo Salia	12,700	64.5	−10.8
New Patriotic Party	Justin Bayelah Dakorah	6,484	33.0	12.3
People's National Convention	Abu Arthur	292	1.5	−0.8
Convention People's Party	Muonaah Elizabeth	102	0.5	—
Democratic People's Party	Angsiema Joycelyn	98	0.5	—
Majority		6,216	31.5	−23.1
Turnout				—

2004 Ghanaian parliamentary election: Jirapa Source:National Electoral Commission, Ghana
Party	Candidate	Votes	%	±%
National Democratic Congress	Edward Kojo Salia	15,580	75.3	−12.6
New Patriotic Party	Winifred A. Dy-Yakah	4,280	20.7	15.9
People's National Convention	James Amare	483	2.3	—
Independent	Nuah Bibiana	354	1.7	—
Majority		11,300	54.6	−25.9
Turnout		21,452	73.9	

2000 Ghanaian parliamentary election: Jirapa Source:Adam Carr's Election Archives
Party	Candidate	Votes	%	±%
National Democratic Congress	Edward Kojo Salia	16,446	87.9	2.2
National Reform Party	Safiatu Badiu	1,380	7.4	−0.3
New Patriotic Party	Timothy Taafaale Dombo	891	4.8	—
Majority		15,066	80.5	2.5
Turnout				

1996 Ghanaian parliamentary election: Jirapa Source:Electoral Commission of Ghana
Party	Candidate	Votes	%	±%
National Democratic Congress	Francis Gyafiiry Korbieh	17,555	85.7	—
New Patriotic Party	Kumbal Columbus Tikure	1,582	7.7	—
People's National Convention	Michael Zu	1,342	6.6	—
Majority		15,973	78.0	—
Turnout		21,214	72.1	42.7

1992 Ghanaian parliamentary election: Jirapa Source:Electoral Commission of Ghana
Party	Candidate	Votes	%	±%
National Convention Party	Issah Alhassan			
Majority				
Turnout		9,716	29.4	

== See also ==
- List of Ghana Parliament constituencies
