= Eunice Brookman-Amissah =

Ghanaian politician

Eunice Brookman-Amissah_{PhD}

Minister of Health
- In office 1996–1998
- President: Jerry Rawlings

Ambassador to Kingdom of the Netherlands
- In office 1996–1998
- President: Jerry Rawlings

Personal details
- Party: National Democratic Congress

Eunice Brookman-Amissah is a Ghanaian former Minister of Health and also served as an Ambassador to the Kingdom of the Netherlands under the Rawlings government. She was the first female vice-president of the Ghana Medical Association.

Brookman-Amissah is also a physician whose leadership has been instrumental in advancing safe abortion access across Africa.

Her efforts have successfully united healthcare providers, government officials, lawyers and activists in support of abortion law reforms in several African countries including Mozambique, Sierra Leone, Benin, Eswatini and Kenya.

In 2023, Brookman-Amssiah was named as one of three Right Livelihood Award laureates for her work on liberalising abortion laws and promoting access to safe abortions in Africa.
