= Minister for Defence (Ghana) =

Government minister

The Minister for Defence (Ghana) is the Ghanaian government official responsible for the Ministry of Defence of Ghana and the Ghana Armed Forces. The Minister for Defence from January 2025 until his death on 6th August 2025 was Dr. Edward Omane Boamah. He was appointed by President John Mahama at the start of his second stint as President of Ghana.

== List of ministers ==
The ministry has had a succession of ministers since independence, starting with the Governor-General. During the rule of the Armed Forces Revolutionary Council, there was no specific minister as the council as a body was responsible for Defence.

During the years of military rule, the official in charge of the Ministry of Defence was often the Head of state. Thus, Lt General J. A..Ankrah, Lt. General A. A. Afrifa were in charge of the Ministry during the National Liberation Council era between 1966 and 1969. Between 1972 and 1979, General I. K. Acheampong and Lt. General F. W. K. Akuffo took charge of the Ministry under the National Redemption Council and the Supreme Military Council. The Armed Forces Revolutionary Council (AFRC) under Flt. Lieutenant Jerry Rawlings was the first military government not to have the Head of state head the ministry. The Provisional National Defence Council (PNDC) military government appointed civilian ministers to head the ministry.

Mahama Iddrisu has served longest in this office. He was the Minister of Defence for the last seven years of the military rule of the PNDC from 1985 to January 1993. He then continued as the first Minister to be appointed in the NDC government of the Fourth republic by Jerry Rawlings from January 1993 to February 1999, an additional six years making a total of fourteen years.

Number	Minister	Took office	Left office	Government	Party
1	Charles Noble Arden-Clarke	1957	1958	Nkrumah government	Governor-General
2	Rev Stephen Allen Dzirasa (MP)	1958	1959	Nkrumah government	Convention People's Party
3	Kwame Nkrumah (MP)	1959	1960	Nkrumah government	Convention People's Party
4	Charles de Graft Dickson (MP)	July 1960	September 1961	Nkrumah government	Convention People's Party
5	Kofi Baako (MP)	September 1961	24 February 1966	Nkrumah government	Convention People's Party
3	Emmanuel Kwasi Kotoka	June 1966	July 1967	National Liberation Council	Military government
6	Joseph Arthur Ankrah	July 1967	1968	National Liberation Council	Military government
7	Akwasi Afrifa	1968	1969	National Liberation Council	Military government
7	Albert Kwesi Ocran	April 1969	September 1969	National Liberation Council	Military government
8	J. Kwesi Lamptey (MP)	September 1969	January 1971	Busia government	Progress Party
9	Bukari Adama (MP)	27 Jan 1971	12 Jan 1972	Busia government	Progress Party
10	Ignatius Kutu Acheampong	Jan 1972	9 Oct 1975	National Redemption Council	Military government
10	Ignatius Kutu Acheampong	9 Oct 1975	5 Jul 1978	Supreme Military Council	Military government
11	Lt. General Fred Akuffo	5 Jul 1978	4 Jun 1979	Supreme Military Council	Military government
12		1979	1979	Armed Forces Revolutionary Council	Military government
13	S. K. Riley-Poku	1979	31 Dec 1981	Limann government	People's National Party
14	Naa Polku Konkuu Chiiri	1982	Nov 1983	Provisional National Defence Council	Military government
15	Rear Admiral C. K. Dzang	22 Nov 1983	1985	Provisional National Defence Council	Military government
16	Mahama Iddrisu	1985	6 Jan 1993	Provisional National Defence Council	Military government
16	Mahama Iddrisu	7 Jan 1993	Feb 1999	Rawlings government	National Democratic Congress
17	Lt. Col. E. K. T. Donkoh	Feb 1999	6 Jan 2001	Rawlings government	National Democratic Congress
18	Kwame Addo-Kufuor (MP)	7 Jan 2001	6 Aug 2007	Kufuor government	New Patriotic Party
19	Albert Kan-Dapaah (MP)	6 Aug 2007	6 Jan 2009	Kufuor government	New Patriotic Party
20	Lt. Gen. Joseph Henry Smith	6 Jan 2009	24 Jul 2012	Mills government	National Democratic Congress
20	Lt. Gen. Joseph Henry Smith	24 Jul 2012	18 Feb 2013	Mahama government	National Democratic Congress
21	Mark Owen Woyongo (MP)	14 Feb 2013	16 July 2014	Mahama government	National Democratic Congress
22	Benjamin Kumbuor (MP)	16 Jul 2014	Feb 2017	Mahama government	National Democratic Congress
23	Dominic Nitiwul (MP)	Feb 2017	6 January 2025	Akufo-Addo government	New Patriotic Party
24	Edward Omane Boamah	30 January 2025	6 August 2025	Mahama 2nd government	National Democratic Congress
	Cassiel Ato Forson (MP) (Acting Minister)	7 August 2025	6 August 2026	Mahama 2nd government	National Democratic Congress
25	Kenneth Gilbert Adjei	7 August 2026	Incumbent	Mahama 2nd government	National Democratic Congress

== See also ==
- Ministry of Defence (Ghana)
