= G. Bedu-Addo =

Commander G. Bedu-Addo was a Ghanaian naval officer who served as Chief of Naval Staff of the Ghana Navy from August 1974 to July 1975.

Military offices
Preceded by Chemogoh Kevin Dzang	Chief of Naval Staff; Aug 1974 – Jul 1975	Succeeded by Chemogoh Kevin Dzang
