= Kofi Baako =

Ghanaian sportsman, teacher and politician

Hon. Kofi Baako
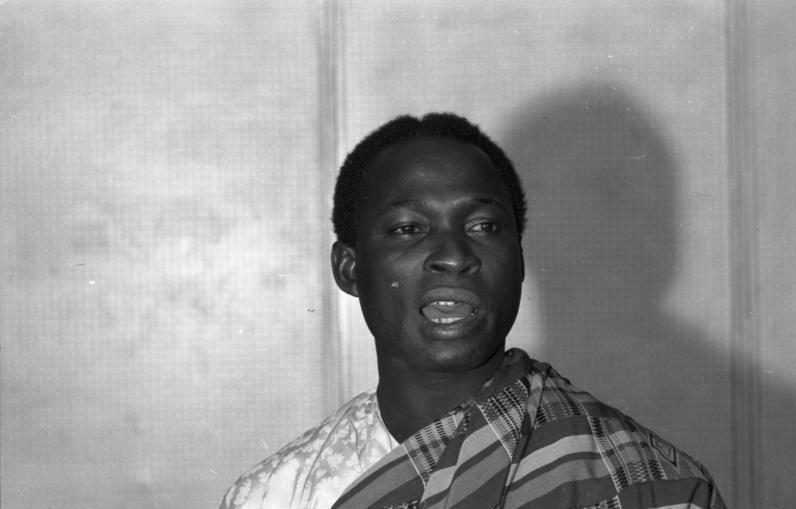
- Kofi Baako in 1958

5th Minister for Defence (Ghana)
- In office September 1961 – February 1966
- President: Kwame Nkrumah
- Preceded by: Charles de Graft Dickson
- Succeeded by: Joseph Arthur Ankrah
- Constituency: Saltpond

Minister for Information and Broadcasting
- In office 1 August 1957 – 1959
- President: Kwame Nkrumah
- Constituency: Saltpond

Personal details
- Born: 1926
- Died: 1984 (aged 57–58)
- Party: Convention People's Party
- Other political affiliations: United Gold Coast Convention
- Children: Kweku Baako Jnr

Kofi Baako (1926-1984) was a Ghanaian sportsman, teacher and politician. He served as Minister for Defence in the Nkrumah government during the First Republic of Ghana until it was overthrown in 1966. He was also held various other ministries throughout the reign of the Convention People's Party.

== Early life and education ==
Kofi Baako's father was a teacher. He made Kofi Baako start school when he was only three years old. On completion of his elementary school education at the Roman Catholic School in his native Saltpond, he continued with his secondary school education at St. Augustine's College, Cape Coast.

== Work and politics ==
Baako became a teacher and later a civil servant. He was inspired by the speeches of Kwame Nkrumah advocating for independence for Ghana. This inspired him to write an article, "My Hatred of Imperialism" which resulted in him being fired from his job. He later met Nkrumah who made him editor-in-chief of the Cape Coast Daily Mail when he was still only twenty years old. Another article he subsequently wrote while with the Daily Mail was "We Call for Freedom." This got him imprisoned by the colonial government. Nkrumah and some other leaders of the Convention People's Party were jailed with him. Later when Nkrumah eventually won elections and formed a government, some of these men who were in prison with him became ministers in Nkrumah's government.

Kofi Baako was elected as Member of Parliament for Saltpond in the Central Region of Ghana. He was appointed a Minister of State by Kwame Nkrumah in his colonial government prior to independence. He continued in various capacities throughout the duration of the Nkrumah government. In the earlier years of the government, he was initially a Minister without portfolio prior to being appointed Minister for Information and Broadcasting in August 1957, making him the youngest minister not only in Ghana but in the whole of the British Commonwealth of Nations. He was appointed into office when he was only 29 years old.

Baako served as Minister for Defence between September 1961 and 24 February 1966.

== Other activities ==
He was reputed to have been good in sport and was active in soccer, cricket and was the national table-tennis champion. His hobbies included reading and photography.

== Family ==
Baako had at least nine children. One of them, Kweku Baako Jnr is a journalist and editor of the New Crusading Guide newspaper.

== See also ==
- Nkrumah government
- Convention People's Party
- Kweku Baako Jnr

Political offices
Preceded by Charles de Graft Dickson	Minister for Defence; 1961 – 1966	Succeeded by Lt. Gen. J. A. Ankrah
Preceded by ?	Minister for Parliamentary Affairs ? – ?	Succeeded by ?
Preceded by J.B. Erzuah	Minister for Education and Information; 1958 – ?	Succeeded by Alfred Jonas Dowuona-Hammond (Education and Social Welfare)
