= E. K. T. Donkoh =

Ghanaian soldier, politician and diplomat

Ambassador of Ghana to Ivory Coast
- In office September 2009 – January 2013
- President: John Evans Atta Mills
- Preceded by: Alhaji Mahama Iddrisu
- Succeeded by: Kwame Addo-Kufuor

Minister for Defence
- In office February 1999 – January 2001
- President: Jerry John Rawlings

Deputy Minister for Defence
- In office 1994 – February 1999
- President: Jerry John Rawlings

Personal details
- Born: Enoch Kwame Tweneboah Donkoh; 1939
- Died: 13 July 2016 (aged 77)
- Party: National Democratic Congress

Military service
- Allegiance: Ghana
- Branch/service: Ghanaian army
- Rank: Lieutenant Colonel

Enoch Kwame Tweneboah Donkoh (1939–2016) was a Ghanaian soldier, politician and diplomat. He served as the Minister of Defence from 1999 to 2001 under the Rawlings government.

== Politics ==
He was a member of the National Democratic Congress. He served as Deputy Minister of Defence from 1994 to 1999. In February 1999, Donkoh was appointed by President Jerry John Rawlings to replace Alhaji Mahama Iddrisu as Minister of Defence. He served in role from February 1999 to January 2001.

== Diplomatic career ==
In September 2009, Donkoh was appointed by president John Evans Atta Mills to serve as Ghana's ambassador to Ivory Coast.

== Death ==
Donkoh died on 13 July 2016 at the age of 77 years.

Political offices
Preceded by Mahama Iddrisu	Minister for Defence; 2001-2007	Succeeded by Kwame Addo-Kufuor
