= Kweku Baako Jnr =

Ghanaian journalist

Kweku Baako
- Born: Ghana
- Occupation: Editor in chief at the new crusading guide (1998–present)

Kweku Baako Jnr is a Ghanaian journalist and the editor-in-chief of the New Crusading Guide newspaper he was also the son of Kofi Baako. He is a frequent panelist on radio shows in Ghana, including Peace FM's weekday morning show and Newsfile, a current affairs programme on Joy FM (Ghana). In 1999 he was awarded the Journalist of the Year by the Ghana Journalists Association. He was polled as the 39th most influential Ghanaian in 2014 by ETV. His love for democracy and free speech made him a victim of several arrests and detentions, especially, in the era of Jerry Rawlings' revolutionary days in Ghana
