= Charles de Graft Dickson =

Ghanaian educationist and politician

Charles de Graft-Dickson

Minister for Defence
- In office 1960–1961
- President: Dr. Kwame Nkrumah
- Preceded by: Dr. Kwame Nkrumah
- Succeeded by: Kofi Baako

Ashanti Regional Minister
- In office 1957–1960
- President: Dr. Kwame Nkrumah
- Preceded by: New
- Succeeded by: R. O. Amoako-Atta

Member of Parliament for Ashanti-Akim
- In office 1956–1965
- President: Kwame Nkrumah
- Preceded by: new
- Succeeded by: Serwaa Annin

Personal details
- Born: Charles de Graft-Dickson; 14 November 1913 Konongo-Odumase, Gold Coast
- Died: 19 November 1997 (aged 84)
- Citizenship: Ghanaian
- Education: Achimota School

Charles de Graft-Dickson (14 November 1913 – 19 November 1997) was a Ghanaian educationist and a politician. He served as a minister of State and a member of parliament in the first republic. Prior to politics, he was the chairman of Asante Kotoko S.C.

== Early life and education ==
Charles de Graft-Dickson was born on 14 November 1913 to Charles Hebert Dickson at Konongo Odumase in the Ashanti Region. His early education begun at St. Peter's Primary School in Kumasi he later proceeded to Prince of Wales College now Achimota School where he obtained his secondary education.

== Career and politics ==
Charles begun teaching at St. Mary's School at Konongo from 1934 to 1937. He spent the next six years working at the Konongo mines. He later joined C. F. A. O. and became its employee president in 1944. In 1949 he was appointed chairman of Asante Kotoko S.C. and served in that capacity until 1953. He was a member of a two-man delegation sent to Puerto Rico for the inaugural ceremony of President Luis Muñoz Marín. On 23 July 1956 he was appointed ministerial secretary (deputy minister) to the Ministry of Education. In 1957 he was elevated to the post of Regional Commissioner (Regional Minister) of the Ashanti Region. In 1960 he was appointed Minister for Defence. He served in this position until 1961.

== Personal life ==
De Graft-Dickson's hobbies included gardening and motoring. He died on 19 November 1997.

Political offices
Preceded by Kwame Nkrumah	Minister for Defence; 1960–1961	Succeeded by Kofi Baako
