= Fred Ohene-Kena =

Ghanaian politician (1936-2019)

Minister for Mines and Energy
- In office 1997–1999
- President: Jerry Rawlings

Ambassador of Ghana to the Czech Republic
- In office 1993–1997
- President: Jerry Rawlings

Eastern Regional Secretary (PNDC)
- In office 1988–1992
- President: Jerry Rawlings
- Preceded by: Acquah Harrison
- Succeeded by: Patience Addow

Personal details
- Born: 28 March 1936 Kukurantumi, Ghana
- Died: 4 October 2019 (aged 83) Tema
- Party: National Democratic Congress
- Relations: Kwaku Ohene-Frempong
- Children: 6
- Education: Camborne School of Mines
- Profession: Mining Engineer

Ferdinand Ohene-Kena (March 28, 1936 – October 4, 2019) was a professional Mining Engineer and a political figure in the Republic of Ghana.

== Early life ==
Born in Kukurantumi, a town in the Eastern Region of Ghana, Mr. Ohene-Kena was the third of 7 children born to his parents. Fred was a product of Ghana Secondary Technical School (GSTS) in Takoradi in the Western Region of Ghana. He received a scholarship to attend the Camborne School of Mines in the UK where he earned his first degree in Mining Engineering becoming one of the first Ghanaians to do so. He later attended the Imperial College of London to earn his master's degree.

== Career ==
He has served his country in a number of offices including what was his home territory as Eastern Regional Secretary during the PNDC era. Prior to that he served as the Under-Secretary for Lands & Natural Resources. He also served as Ghana's Ambassador to the Czech Republic before returning home to hold the position of Minister for Mines & Energy from 1997 until 1999 during the 2nd term of the Rawlings government. During the Kuffour administration, he was the Eastern Regional Chairman for the NDC political party. He later served on the Economic Advisory Council (EAC) and the Judicial Council of Ghana during the Mills administration and also served as the Chairman of the Minerals Commission of Ghana. On June 1, 2010, he was also appointed to the AngloGold Ashanti Board of Directors as a Non-Executive member. He held the position of Chairman of Ghana Bauxite Company Ltd during and after the PNDC era.

== Awards and recognition ==
In 2009, during the 10th anniversary of Okyehene Osagyefuo Amoatia Ofori Panin II, he was conferred the Okyeman Kanea -the highest and most prestigious award by the Okyehene for his contributions in mining to Akyem Abuakwa.

In November 2017, Mr. Ferdinand Ohene-Kena was awarded the LIFETIME ACHIEVEMENT AWARD by the Ghana Chamber of Mines.

== Death ==
On October 4, 2019, Fred peacefully died after a prolonged illness.
