= John Henry Martey Newman =

Ghanaian administrator and lawyer

Hon. John Henry Martey Newman

Chief of Staff to the President
- In office 13 January 2009 – 6 January 2013
- President: John Evans Atta Mills; John Dramani Mahama
- Succeeded by: Prosper Douglas Bani

Personal details
- Party: National Democratic Congress
- Education: University of Ghana; Ghana Institute of Management and Public Administration
- Occupation: Administrator
- Profession: Lawyer

John Henry Martey Newman is a Ghanaian administrator, lawyer and a former Chief of Staff of Ghana. He was appointed by President John Atta Mills in 2009 and served in that capacity even after the death of the president in 2012.

== Early life and education ==
Newman had his secondary school education from Mfantsipim School and proceeded to the University of Ghana where he obtained his Bachelor of Arts degree in history and a bachelor of Laws (LLB) Degree. Newman also obtained a certificate in Public Administration from the Ghana Institute of Management and Public Administration (GIMPA).

== Career ==
Newman is a barrister at law. He worked at the Ministry of Finance of Ghana from 1969 to 1973. From 1975 to 2001 he worked with Ghana Cocoa Board (COCOBOD) a government-controlled institution manages cocoa in the Ghana. From 1996 till his retirement in 2001 from the board, he served as its chief executive officer.

== Political career ==
=== Chief of Staff ===
On 13 January 2009, he was appointed as the Chief of Staff of Ghana by President John Evans Atta Mills. After the demise of his boss the President, John Evans Atta Mills, Newman was the one who broke the news publicly to the world on a live television broadcast of the death of Ghana's president on 24 July 2012. He remained in that role after John Dramani Mahama was sworn in as president on 24 July 2012 as he served as president for the remaining months to finish the term of Atta Mills.

== Council of state ==
After President John Dramani Mahama won the elections in December 2012, he served as a member of the transitional team and after he was sworn in in January 2013, Newman handed over his duties to Prosper Douglas Bani as the new chief of staff. He was subsequently appointed by John Dramani Mahama to serve as a member of the Council of State and the chairman of the council.

== Personal life ==
He is a Freemason under the Grand Lodge of Ghana.

Political offices
| Preceded by ? | Chief of Staff; 2009–2013 | Succeeded by Prosper Douglas Bani |
