= Chemogoh Kevin Dzang =

Former Chief of Naval Staff (Ghana)

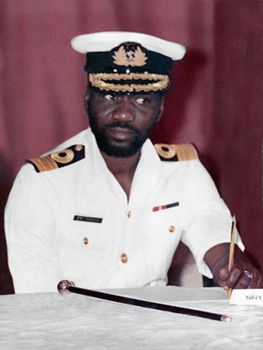
- Rear Admiral Dzang then Commodore And Chief of Naval Staff of the Ghana Navy
- Born: 27 July 1941; Nandom, Upper West Region, Ghana
- Died: 29 December 2009 (aged 68)
- Military career
- Allegiance: Ghana
- Branch: Ghana Navy
- Rank: Rear Admiral
- Commands: Chief of Naval Staff
- Other work: High Commissioner to Australia; PNDC Secretary of State For Defence; Ambassador to Japan; Member of the Supreme Military Council (SMC I)

Rear Admiral Chemogoh Kevin Dzang MSG (27 July 1941 — 29 December 2009) was born at Nandom in the Upper West Region of Ghana. He was a naval officer and a former Chief of Naval Staff of the Ghana Navy. He also served Ghana as a Secretary of State for Defence and an ambassador to Japan with concurrent accreditation to the Commonwealth of Australia, Papua New Guinea, Singapore, South Korea, Malaysia, New Zealand, Indonesia, the Philippines, Brunei Darussalam and Thailand.

== Early life and education ==
Born at Nandom in the Lawra-Nandom district of the Upper West Region of Ghana, Dzang was educated at the Nandom Local Authority Primary School from 1948 to 1953 and the Lawra Middle School from 1954 to 1955. Having passed the Common Entrance Examination, he was attended the Government Secondary School at Tamale (now Tamale Senior High School) from 1956 to 1960. After the General Certificate of Examinations, he opted to join the Ghana Armed Forces (Navy) rather than continue to the sixth form for which he was well qualified and given admission to pursue Science at the same Government Secondary School in Tamale. In a highly competitive selection process, Dzang entered the Ghana Military Academy as an Officer Cadet in September 1960. While in the academy, he was confirmed a Naval Cadet and proceeded to the Britannia Royal Naval College, Dartmouth in South Devon, United Kingdom, in August 1961. Along with six other Ghanaian cadets, Dzang joined the British and other Commonwealth naval cadets for comprehensive training, starting as naval cadets to midshipmen at sea and acting sub-lieutenants. Dzang graduated from Dartmouth in 1964 and returned to Ghana for deployment within the Ghana Armed Forces.

== Appointments and command history ==
His first appointment was to the ship GNS Afadzato as first lieutenant and second-in-command. The ship immediately sailed for refit in Gibraltar in the company of GNS Yogaga. Both vessels were inshore minesweepers and the passage was epoch-breaking, eventful, and uncomfortable. In the end, however, both officers and men discovered their ‘sea legs’ and developed indomitable confidence to face challenges at sea.

While the vessels were refitting in Gibraltar, Dzang was appointed to GNS Achimota for the passage from Southampton to Ghana, with secondary duties as the navigational officer. After docking in Tema, Ghana, Dzang was flown back to Gibraltar to rejoin GNS Afadzato for the return passage to Ghana after the refit. Apart from the anxiety of the crew to return home to their loved ones and friends, the passage itself was smooth and uneventful. A few months after the vessels’ return to Ghana, Dzang was promoted to lieutenant and given command of GNS Afadzato in 1965.

Soon after assuming command, the coup d‘état of February 1966 took place. By the terms and conditions of service of the expatriate British Joint Services Training Team (BJSTT), no British personnel were to be involved in duties associated with the coup in Ghana. It was therefore the added responsibility of ships commanded by Ghanaian naval officers to undertake all patrol duties at sea and protect the territorial sovereignty of Ghana. In 1967, Dzang was appointed the training officer at the Takoradi Naval Base. In 1968, he was given additional duties as the base administrative officer.

With the BJSTT not in full control because of the military government, the Navy in particular was short of experienced senior personnel. The substantive Chief of Naval Staff (CNS) and Navy Commander, Rear Admiral David Hanson, was relieved of his duties and appointed defense advisor to the High Commission in London. Air Marshall M.A. Otu, the Chief of Air Staff, was appointed Acting Chief of Naval Staff as well, while Commodore Krishnan of the Indian Navy was commissioned to review the Ghana Navy. Krishnan was tasked with evaluating the personnel situation and promoting Ghanaian officers to top administrative positions. He also reviewed the Navy fleet and suggested suitable vessels for acquisition. The government approved most of his recommendations and selected seven senior executive officers for senior appointments, intending to identify a suitable candidate for the Chief of Naval Staff and Navy Commander positions. Krishnan's team consisted of both Ghanaian and Indian staff members.

== Chief of Naval Staff (CNS) and Navy Commander ==
Dzang was selected as Chief of Naval Staff in 1972, while he was at the Defence Services Staff College in Wellington India. Upon his return, he was promoted to the rank of naval captain and appointed the substantive Chief of Naval Staff and Navy Commander. Dzang was thus the first Dartmouth-trained executive naval officer to assume substantive command of the Ghana Navy and as the Chief of Naval Staff.

Rear Admiral Hansen had acquired many ships for the Navy while he was CNS. Quaye had also ordered two fast patrol boats, which were under construction by Christof Rutorf in a German shipyard at Mainz Kastel. Many of the vessels in the fleet were now very old and needed refitting. The necessary funds were not available, and so the ships on the inventory were not seaworthy.

The CNS was mandated to refurbish and refit the ships to make them seaworthy and efficiently perform at sea. There was equally a need for sea training for all ranks.Two corvettes, which were in very bad condition, were the first to be sent to Vosper Thorny croft in the United Kingdom for refit. Local refits were also carried out on the Seaward Defence Boats. The Tema Dry Dock and the Naval Ship Yard in Sekondi were upgraded for future local refits. The requisite technical personnel were recruited and trained locally and overseas to meet the daunting task of keeping the small fleet of ships seaworthy. In addition, the new CNS oversaw the completion of the building of the new ships in Germany, and commissioned them into the fleet as GNS Sahene and GNS Dela. Four more ships designed specifically for the Ghana Navy were also under construction by Luessen Shipyard in Germany. By the time the four ships were delivered, Dzang had left the Navy, but the vessels were taken into inventory and commissioned as GNS Achimota, GNS Yogaga, GNS Sibo and GNS Gyata. To date these four vessels from Luessen Shipyard constitute the core of the aging Navy Fleet.

While the Ghana Navy revamped under his command, Dzang proceeded to the US Naval War College in Rhode Island in 1974 to broaden his knowledge in naval, military, national and international matters, in order to enhance the efficient discharge of duties as Chief of Naval Staff and the Navy Commander. In his absence, the chief staff officer, Commander George Bedu Addo, acted for him. Dzang resumed duties on his return to Ghana in August 1975. By October 1975, the national political situation demanded that the service chiefs assumed the added responsibility of running the Government of Ghana as members of the Supreme Military Council (SMC). The National Redemption Council (NRC), which comprised middle-rank officers, ran into several difficulties and in a palace reassessment. It was decided that the ultimate authority should emanate from the top of the military hierarchy. In the event, the Chief of Defence Staff (CDS), service commanders of the Army, Navy, Air force, Border Guards and the Inspector General of Police (IGP) were appointed to the Supreme Military Council Government with General Ignatius Kutu Acheampong as the chairman of the council and Head of State. The added responsibility made service commanders vulnerable to both domestic and international political pressures, as well as to the inevitable hostility and sabotage that often accompany politics.

== Retirement from the navy ==
The Head of State, with the concurrence of colleagues in the SMC, delegated the Chief of Naval Staff, as chairman of the Military Advisory Council (MAC). As the mandate was all-inclusive, MAC could therefore discuss any subject affecting the armed forces, the Government and Ghana in general, providing suggestions and advice to the SMC government. As the chairman, the responsibility rested with Dzang to convey the advice and/or recommendations to the SMC, of which the Chief of Naval Staff was also a member – a duality that potentially put Dzang in a delicate situation. In due course, this dilemma befell the chairman of MAC, and he was promptly relieved of the duties of Chief of Naval Staff and Navy Commander, hence his membership of the SMC and as the chairman of MAC. Dzang refused to provide more details on this matter due to confidentiality reasons, even after being asked multiple times.

He handed over his responsibilities and turned to farming as a means of making a living. Fortunately, the “Operation Feed Your Self” policy of the military and the SMC was successful, and many hardworking Ghanaians were reaping success in farming. The first few years were difficult for a ‘salt horse’ from the Navy, but eventually, some good progress was made, and life outside the armed forces was bearable.

== Diplomatic career ==
Soon after the “honourable compulsory retirement” of Dzang, General Ignatius Kutu Acheampong offered him a job as Ghana’s High Commissioner to the Court of Saint James, United Kingdom, which was declined owing to the unexplained circumstances leading to his removal from office. A year later in 1978, Acheampong himself and SMC I were unseated and General Fred Akuffo, a former colleague of Dzang in SMC I, became the new Head of State and Chairman of SMC II. After SMC II came to power, Dzang was again contacted to take up office as High Commissioner to the United Kingdom. Again the offer was not accepted at first, but upon persistent appeals, Dzang opted for the Commonwealth of Australia rather than the United Kingdom, with the hope that it would be difficult to secure an agreement since Ghana’s most eminent diplomat, Dr. Ebenezer Kodjo Debrah, had only just been appointed to that country. Somehow, the Government succeeded in granting his humble request by switching the posts. Thus, Dzang was appointed High Commissioner to the Commonwealth of Australia from 1978 to 1982, with concurrent accreditations to Malaysia, Indonesia and Papua New Guinea.

== The revolution and its aftermath ==
While at post, the Armed Forces Revolutionary Council (AFRC), under the chairmanship of Flight Lieutenant Jerry John Rawlings, took over the reins of government in a bloody revolution on 4 June 1979, during which some members of SMC I and SMC II were executed by firing squad and other senior military officers sentenced to many years of imprisonment. Life at post during the Revolution was uncomfortable and pensive. The Staff at the High Commission pored through the occasional newspapers received from Ghana’s Ministry of Foreign Affairs for any adverse information or otherwise about their boss who they knew was formerly a Member of SMC I. Fortunately, the heady days of the AFRC were soon over and Dr. Hilla Limann took over the reins of Government as the democratically elected civilian Head of State. Dzang therefore remained at post as Ghana’s High Commissioner to the Commonwealth of Australia, albeit through the very difficult period from the time of the SMC II government through the AFRC government and President Limann’s Government, to the early days of Chairman J.J. Rawlings’ Provisional National Defence Council (PNDC). The Limann Government had actually recalled Dzang for reassignment, but the new PNDC government held the recall in abeyance.

In February 1982, Dzang finally wound down business in Canberra, Australia, and returned to Ghana, and straight back to his rice farm in Kpalgini in the Northern Region, recording successes in rice farming for about three years before a recall to duty as Secretary for Defence in 1985. It was a difficult tenure of office in the Defence Ministry because the relationship between the officers and the men was anything but cordial. It required tactful handling through durbars to right the perceived wrongs and chart a new course away from the animosities and hatred of the past, to a new one commensurate with, and necessary for disciplined services established to defend the country through thick and thin. Dzang’s diplomacy would serve him well in this capacity. Progress was slow but successful. On Dzang’s own request, the PNDC government released him to return to the farming venture, which was going through difficult times due to change in government policy.

Acheampong and SMC I had drastically subsidized farming inputs and encouraged everyone to go into farming if they so desired. Civil Servants and Service personnel were encouraged to have backyard farms/gardens. The World Bank, however, managed to convince the PNDC government and coerced policy makers to withdraw the subsidies on inputs like fertilizer, making it expensive and difficult for the poor village farmer to continue in farming ventures profitably. With the policy change, the rice farming industry collapsed and those farmers who failed to recognize the downward spiral in earnings, following poor record keeping, discovered the worsening situation only too late and thus went bankrupt. Kedge Resources, the vehicle on which Dzang conducted his farming, noticed the warning signs and scaled down involvement in rice farming in particular, while emphasizing other areas that did not depend too much on Government subsidies.

In 1994, the NDC government again offered Dzang ambassadorial assignment to Japan. The offer was eventually accepted and from 1994 to 1998, he served as Ghana’s Ambassador to Japan with concurrent accreditations to the Commonwealth of Australia, Papua New Guinea, Singapore, South Korea, Malaysia, New Zealand, Indonesia, the Philippines, Brunei Darussalam and Thailand. During his tour of duty to Japan, high-level official visits were made by President J.J. Rawlings to Malaysia, Singapore, the Philippines and of course Japan in 1997.

Dzang finally retired from public service in 1998 and became self-employed with interests in traditional royal matters bequeathed to him by his forebears in the Nandom area.

== Family ==
Dzang was married to Emelia (Kpinbo) Dzang. They had three children, Julian Walier Dzang, Prospera Sorviel (Dzang) Tedam and Benjamin Dzang.

== Death ==
Dzang died in December 2009 following illness. He was buried on 26 February 2010 at Nandom.

== Training and appointments ==
- Ghana Military Academy, Teshie Accra 1960–1961
- Britannia Royal Naval College, Dartmouth 1961–1964
- 1st Lieutenant GNS AFADZATO 1964–1965
- Commanding Officer GNS AFADZATO 1965–1967
- Training Officer Naval Base, Takoradi 1967–1968
- Base Administrative Officer 1967
- 1st Lieutenant GNS EJURA 1968
- Commanding officer GNS EJURA 1968
- Senior Officer Coastal Squadron (SOCS) 1968
- Director Personnel & Administration Navy Headquarters 1969–1970
- Commanding Officer GNS KETA 1971–1972
- Senior Officer Afloat, Ghana Navy Fleet (SOA) 1971–1972
- Acting Naval Officer In Charge (NOIC) Takoradi 1971
- Defence Services Staff College Wellington, India 1972
- Chief of Naval Staff and Navy Commander 1973–1974
- United States Naval War College Newport, Rhode Island. 1974–1975
- Chief of Naval Staff And Navy Commander 1975–1977
- Member of the Supreme Military Council (SMC I) 1975–1977
- High Commissioner to the Commonwealth of Australia. 1978–1982
- PNDC Secretary of State For Defence 1985–1986
- Ambassador Extraordinary & Plenipotentiary to Japan 1994–1998

== Honours and awards ==
- Ghana Military Academy Intake 2, Teshie Accra 1960 - 1961
- Graduate of the Britannia Royal Naval College, Dartmouth 1964
- Certificate of Service as Master Mariner 1968
- Defence Services Staff College. Wellington India ‘PSC’ Pass Staff College. - 1972
- US Naval War College. MSc Military Studies 1975
- ORDRE NATIONALE, Grand Officer Republic of Guinea 1976
- Member of the Star of Ghana ‘MSG’ 1978
- Graduate Diploma in International Law, Australian National University. 1981
- Soka University, Japan – Highest Honour. 1997
- Honorary naming of a speedboat by the Ghana Navy after Rear Admiral C.K Dzang 27 Oct 2008

Military offices
| Preceded by Rear Admiral Joy Kobla Amedume | Chief of Naval Staff; Feb 1973 – Aug 1974 | Succeeded by Commander G. Bedu-Addo |
| Preceded by Commander G. Bedu-Addo | Chief of Naval Staff; Jul 1975 – Jun 1977 | Succeeded by Rear Admiral Joy Kobla Amedume |
Political offices
| Preceded by Naa Polku Konkuu Chiiri | Secretary for Defence; 1982 – 1983 | Succeeded by Mahama Iddrisu |
