= Serwaa Annin =

Ghanaian politician

Member of the Ghana Parliament for Ashanti-Akim
- In office 1965–1966
- Preceded by: Charles de Graft Dickson
- Succeeded by: Constituency split

Personal details
- Born: Serwaa Annin Gold Coast
- Party: Convention People's Party

Serwaa Annin was a Ghanaian politician in the first republic. She was the member of parliament for the Ashanti-Akim constituency from 1965 to 1966.

== See also ==
- List of MPs elected in the 1965 Ghanaian parliamentary election
