= Cletus Seidu Dapilah =

Ghanaian politician (born 1980)

Hon Cletus Seidu Dapilah
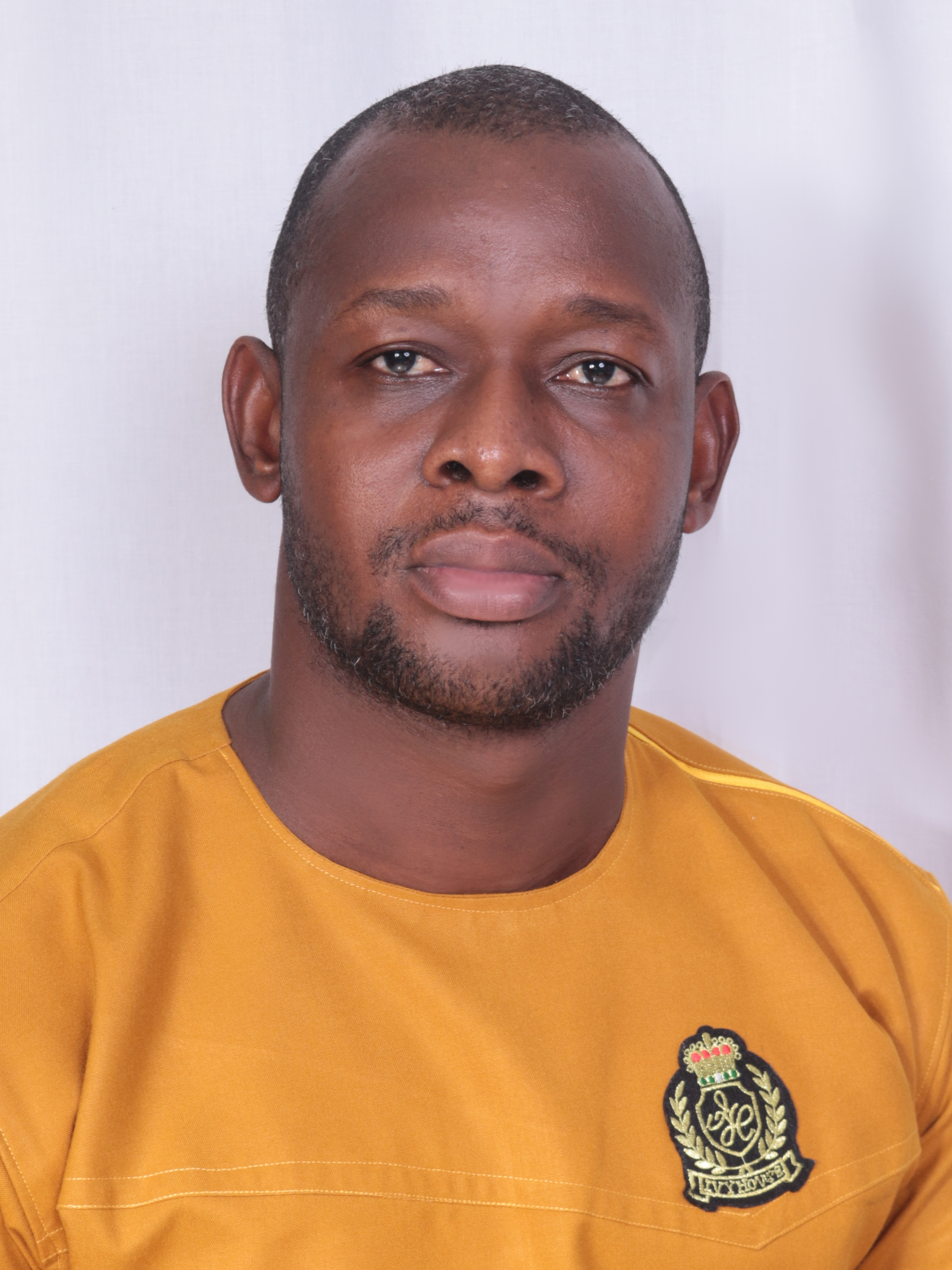

Member of the Ghana Parliament for Jirapa
- Incumbent
- Assumed office 7 January 2021

Personal details
- Born: Cletus Seidu Dapilah; 2 April 1980 (age 46) Tizza-Nimbare
- Party: National Democratic Congress
- Occupation: Politician
- Committees: Judiciary Committee, Foreign Affairs Committee

Cletus Seidu Dapilah (born 2 April 1980) is a Ghanaian politician and member of the National Democratic Congress. He is the member of parliament for the Jirapa Constituency in the Upper West Region.

== Early life and education ==
Dapilah hails from Tizza-Nimbare. He holds a Bachelor of Business Administration.
