= Kofi Totobi Quakyi =

Ghanaian politician

Minister for Information
- In office 1985–2001
- President: Jerry Rawlings
- Preceded by: Joyce Aryee
- Succeeded by: Jake Obetsebi-Lamptey

Minister for National Security
- Preceded by: Kojo Tsikata

Personal details
- Born: 14 November 1955 (age 70) Sekondi, Ghana
- Party: National Democratic Congress
- Education: University of Cape Coast
- Occupation: Trade unionist

Kofi Totobi Quakyi is a Ghanaian politician. He served as Minister for Information from 1985 to 1993 under the Provisional National Defence Council government and continued from 1993 to 2001 in the same capacity in the government of Jerry Rawlings. He is a member of the National Democratic Congress (NDC).

== Early life and education ==
Totobi Quaky is a graduate of the University of Cape Coast, where he obtained a Bachelor of Arts in Education degree. He was also active in student politics and served as the President of the National Union of Ghana Students (NUGS).

== Work ==
Totobi Quakyi was for most of his time an employee of the Trades Union Congress of Ghana. He worked in various capacities, finally becoming its secretary between 1986 and 1988.

== Politics ==
Totobi Quakyi was appointed Secretary for Information by Jerry Rawlings in the Provisional National Defence Council which was a military government. He became a member of the National Democratic Congress when constitutional rule was restored in 1993. He continued as Information Minister in the Rawlings government after President Rawlings became the democratically elected president in the 1992 Ghanaian presidential election. He has been the longest serving Information Minister in Ghana. He also became the chairman of the Board of Directors of the National Communications Authority in August 2009.

Political offices
| Preceded by Joyce Aryee | Minister for Information; 1985–2001 | Succeeded by Jake Obetsebi-Lamptey |
| Preceded by Kojo Tsikata | Minister for National Security ? – 2001 | Succeeded by Francis Poku |
