= S. K. Riley-Poku =

Ghanaian politician

Honourable S. K. Riley-Poku

Minister for Defence
- In office 1979 – 31 December 1981
- President: Hilla Limann
- Vice President: J. W. S. de Graft-Johnson
- Succeeded by: Naa Polku Konkuu Chiiri

Personal details
- Party: People's National Party
- Profession: Lawyer

S. K. Riley-Poku is a Ghanaian lawyer, educationist and politician. He was the Minister for Defence of Ghana between 1979 and 1981.

== Constituent assembly ==
Riley-Poku represented the Amansie District Council of the Ashanti Region in the Constituent Assembly which drafted the 1979 Ghana constitution prior to the 1979 Ghanaian general election.

== Role in government ==
Riley-Poku was a member of the People's National Party and was appointed by Hilla Limann as the Minister for Defence in his government in 1979. He remained in this position until December 1981 when the government was overthrown in a coup d'état. Following his time in government, he continued practising as a lawyer.

== Other roles ==
Prior to being in politics, Riley-Poku served as the headmaster of Sekondi College between 1966 and 1969. He later practised as a lawyer and was a member of the Ghana Bar Association. During this time, he was also a member of the board of the Volta River Authority.

== See also ==
- Limann government

Political offices
Preceded by Military rule	Minister for Defence; 1979 – 1981	Succeeded by Naa Polku Konkuu Chiiri
