= Manhyia (Ghana parliament constituency) =

Ghana parliament constituency

- constituency for the Parliament of Ghana
- District: Kumasi Metropolitan District
- Region: Ashanti Region of Ghana

Current constituency
- Party: New Patriotic Party
- MP: Mathew Opoku Prempeh

Manhyia is one of the constituencies represented in the Parliament of Ghana. It elects one Member of Parliament (MP) by the first past the post system of election. Manhyia is located in the Kumasi Metropolitan district of the Ashanti Region of Ghana.

== Boundaries ==
The seat is located within the Kumasi Metropolitan District of the Ashanti Region of Ghana.

== Members of Parliament ==
Election	Member	Party
1965	Daniel Emmanuel Asafo-Agyei	Convention People's Party
1969	Kwame Safo-Adu	Popular Front Party
1979	Charles Amankwah	Popular Front Party
1992	William Kwaku Asante	National Democratic Congress
1996	Kwame Addo-Kufuor	New Patriotic Party
2008	Mathew Opoku Prempeh	New Patriotic Party

== Elections ==
2008 Ghanaian parliamentary election: Manhyia Source:Ghana Home Page
Party	Candidate	Votes	%	±%
New Patriotic Party	Mathew Opoku Prempeh	65,978	77.2	+1.6
National Democratic Congress	Charles Saifa Bonsu	17,327	20.3	+9.4
Convention People's Party	Yaw Nkunim	1,347	1.6	+1.0
People's National Convention	Salifu Mumuni	512	0.6	−0.2
Independent	Nana Frema Busia	332	0.4	—
Majority		48,651	56.9	−6.5
Turnout		—	—	—

2004 Ghanaian parliamentary election:Manhyia Source:Ghana Home Page
Party	Candidate	Votes	%	±%
New Patriotic Party	Kwame Addo-Kufuor	66,210	75.6	−6.1
Independent	Kofi Akpaloo	10,704	12.2	N/A
National Democratic Congress	Kwame Boateng	9,550	10.9	−4.7
People's National Convention	Salifu Mumuni	667	0.8	−1.3
Convention People's Party	Alex Ohene Darko	498	0.6	0.0
Majority		55,506	63.4	−2.7

2000 Ghanaian parliamentary election:Manhyia Source:Adam Carr's Election Archives
Party	Candidate	Votes	%	±%
New Patriotic Party	Kwame Addo-Kufuor	64,067	81.7	
National Democratic Congress	Samuel B. Donkoh	12,244	15.6	
People's National Convention	Salifu Mumuni	1,614	2.1	
Convention People's Party	Nana O Boateng	443	0.6	
Majority		51,823	66.1	
Turnout		78,368	64.0	

1996 Ghanaian parliamentary election:Manhyia Source:
Party	Candidate	Votes	%	±%
New Patriotic Party	Kwame Addo-Kufuor			

1992 Ghanaian parliamentary election:Manhyia Source:
Party	Candidate	Votes	%	±%
National Democratic Congress	William Kwaku Asante			

== See also ==
- List of Ghana Parliament constituencies
