= Edward Salia =

Ghanaian politician (1952–2009)

Hon. Edward Kojo Salia

Member of Parliament for Jirapa Constituency
- In office 7 January 2009 – 6 January 2013
- President: John Atta Mills; John Mahama
- Succeeded by: Francis Bawaana Dakurah

Member of Parliament for Jirapa Constituency
- In office 7 January 2005 – 6 January 2009
- President: John Kufuor

Member of Parliament for Jirapa Constituency
- In office 7 January 2001 – 6 January 2005
- President: John Kufuor
- Preceded by: Francis G. Korbieh

Personal details
- Born: 20 June 1952
- Died: 5 June 2012 (aged 59)
- Party: National Democratic Congress
- Children: 4
- Education: University of Ghana
- Profession: Politician

Edward Kojo Salia (20 June 1952 – 16 February 2009) was a Ghanaian Member of Parliament. He was also a member of the National Democratic Congress and was a Minister of State in the Rawlings government.

== Early life and education ==
Salia was born on 20 June 1952. He was born at Amasaman in the Greater Accra Region of Ghana. His parents were Bajeluru Dorcie Salia, a farmer and Habiba Yiringsaa, a housewife. He attended the University of Ghana at Legon.

He also attended the Institute of Social Studies at The Hague in the Netherlands. He also studied at the Carleton University in Ontario, Canada and Ottawa University . Between 2005 and 2007, he studied at the Ghana Institute of Management and Public Administration at Achimota in Accra.

== Politics ==
Salia was appointed Minister of Transport and Communications in the Rawlings government in 1993. He also served as Minister for Mines and Energy and later for Roads and Transport in Jerry Rawlings's government.

He was first elected as the member of parliament for the Jirapa in the 2000 election and he retained his seat in the two subsequent elections in 2004 and 2008.

=== 2000 Elections ===
Salia was elected as the member of parliament for the Jirapa constituency in the Upper West region of Ghana in the 2000 Ghanaian general elections. He therefore represented the constituency in the 4th parliament of the 4th republic of Ghana.

He was elected with 16,446 votes out of the total votes cast. This is equivalent to 87.9% of the total valid votes cast. He was elected over Salifatu Badiu of the National Reform Party and Timothy Taafaale Dombo of the New Patriotic Party. These two obtained 1,380 and 891 votes respectively of the total valid votes cast.

These were equivalent to 7.4% and 4.8% respectively of the total valid votes cast. Salia was elected on the ticket of the National Democratic Congress. The National Democratic Congress won a total of 7 parliamentary seats in the Upper West Region in that election. In all, the party won a minority total of 89 parliamentary representation out of 200 seats in the 3rd parliament of the 4th republic of Ghana.

=== 2004 Elections ===
Salia was elected as the member of parliament for the Jirapa constituency in the Upper West region of Ghana in the 2004 Ghanaian general elections. He represented the constituency in the 4th parliament of the 4th republic of Ghana.

He was elected with 15,580 votes out of 20,697 total valid votes cast. This was equivalent to 75.3% of the total valid votes cast. He was elected over James Amare of the People's National Convention, Winifred A. DY-Yakah of the New Patriotic Party and Nuah Bibiana, an independent candidate. They obtained 483 votes, 4280 votes and 354 votes respectively of the total valid votes cast.

These were equivalent to 2.3%, 20.7% and 1.7% respectively of the total valid votes cast. Salia was elected on the ticket of the National Democratic Congress. The National Democratic Congress won a total of 7 parliamentary seats in the Upper West Region in that elections.

In all, the party won a minority total of 94 parliamentary representation out of 230 seats in the 4th parliament of the 4th republic of Ghana.

== Personal life ==
Salia was a Christian.

Parliament of Ghana
Preceded by Francis G. Korbieh	Member of Parliament for Jirapa; 2001 - 2009	Succeeded by Francis Bawaana Dakurah
Political offices
Preceded by	Minister for Transport and Communications; 1993 - 1995	Succeeded by
Preceded by Richard Kwame Peprah	Minister for Mines and Energy; 1995 -	Succeeded by Fred Ohene-Kena
Preceded by	Minister for Roads and Transport: 2001	Succeeded by Felix Owusu-Adjapong (Minister for Transport and Communications)
