= Esther Nkansah =

Ghanaian politician (1948–2019)

Hon. Esther Lily Nkansah
- President: Jerry Rawlings

Personal details
- Born: 1948 Ghana
- Died: 28 December 2019 (aged 71) Effia Nkwanta Regional Hospital, Sekondi
- Party: NDC

Esther Lily Nkansah (1948 – 28 December 2019) was a Ghanaian lawyer and a former Regional Minister of the Western Region from 1997 to 2001 in the Rawlings Government. In 2010, she was named to the 10-member Board of Bank of Ghana by President Atta Mills to assist the government with its Better Ghana Agenda. Mrs. Nkansah was also the Lay Chairperson of the Sekondi Diocese of the Methodist Church.

== Educational background ==
Esther Nkansah attended the University of Cape Coast in Ghana. During her time there, she served as the President of Everywoman Incorporated, a student organization focused on women's empowerment, and also led the praise and worship team for the National Union of Presbyterian Students of Ghana (NUPSG).

== Political History ==
Mrs. Nkansah was a legal practitioner who in 1997 was appointed as the minister for Western Region under the Jerry John Rawlings' administration.

In September 2004, Esther Nkansah was elected as the National Democratic Congress (NDC) parliamentary candidate for the Takoradi Constituency in the 2004 general elections.
