= Kwame Safo-Adu =

Ghanaian politician

Minister of Agriculture
- In office 1969–1972
- President: Edward Akufo-Addo
- Prime Minister: Kofi Abrefa Busia
- Preceded by: Twum Barimah
- Succeeded by: Major-General Daniel Addo

Member of the Ghana Parliament for Manhyia constituency
- In office 1969–1972
- Preceded by: Daniel Emmanuel Asafo-Agyei
- Succeeded by: Charles Amankwah

Personal details
- Born: Kwame Adu-Safo; 23 December 1932 Pasuro; Kumasi, Gold Coast
- Died: 2 October 2009 (aged 76)
- Education: Achimota College; University of Ghana; University of London

Kwame Safo-Adu was a Ghanaian physician and also a Ghanaian politician; a Minister of State in the second republic and a founding member of the New Patriotic Party.

== Early life and education ==
He was born on 23 December 1932 at Pasuro, Kumasi in the Ashanti Region. He attended Methodist Mission School in Kumasi from 1939 to 1945. He continued at Achimota College from 1945 to 1951 and the University of Ghana from 1952 to 1954. He was trained at King's College London School of Medicine, University of London, England from 1954 to 1961 where he won the Linchley Prize for Pharmacology in 1956. He proceeded to the University of Cambridge in 1962 for a three months research.

== Career ==
He was a demonstrator in Physiology and Pharmacology at King's College London School of Medicine from 1957 to 1960 and a lecturer in Pharmacology and Therapeutics at the University of Ibadan medical school, Nigeria from 1962 to 1965. He began a private practice in Kumasi in 1966. He was a former chairman of the advisory committee of the Center for Civic education and Ashanti regional president of the Ashanti youth association. He served in the council of state in Ghana's third republic. He was managing director of Industrial Chemical Laboratories (ICL).

== Politics ==
He was elected member of parliament for Manhyia constituency and was Minister of Agriculture in the Busia regime from 1969 to 1972; it was during his tenure that Ghana exported rice for the first time in 1970. He was a founding member of the Popular Front Party and also presidential aspirant for the party in 1979. He was also a founding member of the New Patriotic Party (NPP). He was a presidential aspirant for the party in 1992 and 1996.

== Persecution ==
During the Provisional National Defence Council (PNDC) era, Dr. Safo-Adu was arrested and put in the James Fort Prison in Accra for three weeks. He was accused of 13 charges of misapplication of public property and committing acts with intent to sabotage the country's economy. His factory: Industrial Chemical Laboratories (ICL), a successful pharmaceutical firm was seized by a horde of men. Others who were also detained were Adrews Kumi, a senior bank official and Frank Kwaku Bruce, a senior Ministry of Health official. Hon. Kwamena Bartels who was a co-director of the company was also arrested in mid-1990 and charged based on a report by the National Investigations Committees, which was responsible for initiating prosecutions before the public tribunals. The tribunal, chaired by Kweku Boakye-Danquah, ruled that the loans he secured could not be regarded in law as public property, adding that the charges were misconceived and disclosed no crime. The charges, he explained, arose out of civil contracts arising from agreements between his company and the state-owned National Investment Bank.

== Personal life ==
His hobbies included; music and reading.

== Death ==
He died on Friday 2 October 2009 at the Korle-Bu Teaching Hospital in Accra.

== See also ==
- Minister for Food and Agriculture (Ghana)
- Busia government
