= Christine Amoako-Nuamah =

Ghanaian scientist and politician

Christina Amoako-Nuama

Minister for Lands and Forestry
- In office 1998–2001
- President: Jerry Rawlings

Minister for Education
- In office 1997–1998
- President: Jerry Rawlings

Minister for Environment, Science and Technology
- In office 1993–1996
- President: Jerry Rawlings

Personal details
- Party: National Democratic Congress
- Education: University of Ghana

Christine Amoako-Nuamah is a Ghanaian scientist and politician who served as the Minister for Environment, Science and Technology (1993–1996), Minister for Education (1997–1998), and Minister for Lands and Forestry (1998–2001) under the Rawlings government.

== Career ==
She served as a presidential adviser to the Mills and Mahama governments. She was also the board chairman of the Ghana Institute of Management and Public Administration governing council.
