= Clend Mawuko Sowu =

Ghanaian politician and soldier

Hon. Clend Mawuko Sowu

Member of Parliament for Anlo Constituency
- In office 7 January 1993 – 6 January 2001
- Preceded by: new constituency
- Succeeded by: James Victor Gbeho

Personal details
- Born: 1932
- Died: 4 December 2010 (aged 78) East Legon, Accra, Ghana
- Party: National Democratic Congress

Clend Mawuko Sowu was a Ghanaian politician, soldier, member of the National Democratic Congress (NDC), Board Chairman of the Electricity Company of Ghana and Member of Parliament for the Anlo Constituency. He also served as Minister of Works and Housing and Regional Minister of the Volta Region during the Jerry John Rawlings government.

== Early life ==
He hailed from Tegbi, near Keta in the Volta Region and was a schooled at Mfantsipim School in Cape Coast. Squadron Leader Sowu trained at the Royal Air Force in 1958 as the first Ghanaian parachutist. He enlisted in the Ghana Military Academy in 1961 and was commissioned into the Air Branch of the Ghana Air Force on December 4, 1962. He retired on September 18, 1973.

== Education ==
He attended London University where he obtained his Bachelor of Science degree. He thereafter moved to Granfield College of Aeronautics and Harvard University to obtain his Post-Graduate Certificates.

== Political career ==
During his career as a politician and public office holder, he was a former Volta Regional Minister (1993), Minister of Works and Housing (1993-1994), He was elected into the first parliament of the fourth republic of Ghana on 7 January 1993 after he was pronounced winner at the 1992 Ghanaian parliamentary election held on 29 December 1992. and leading member of the NDC. He was the chairman of the Board of Directors of the Electricity Company of Ghana (ECG).

== Death ==
He died on December 4, 2010, in his East Legon, Accra residence. He was 78 years old.
