= Kwadwo Mpiani =

Ghanaian politician

Kwadwo Okyere Mpiani is a Ghanaian financial advisor, management consultant and politician. He served as chief of staff and minister of presidential affairs in the John Kufuor Administration. He also served a member of parliament representing Mampong South in the Ashanti Region in the 3rd Republic of Ghana from 1979 to 1981. He is a member of the New Patriotic Party.

== Early life and education ==
Mpiani attended Prempeh College in Kumasi between February 1955 and December 1961 where he had his secondary school education. He later attended the University of Ghana from October 1963 to June 1966 and graduated with a Bachelor in Administration in 1966.

Mpiani also attended the Arthur D. Little Institute for Economics from September 1968 to July 1969,

== Career ==
Mpiani worked for the Capital Investment Corporation which is now Ghana Investment Promotion Centre (GIPC) and later at the National Investment Bank. By 1974, he had been promoted to serve as head of the National Investment Bank's investment development department. In 1978 he became Bank's managing director.

He is a board member of the John Agyekum Kufuor Foundation (JAK), a foundation set up by John Agyekum Kufour to promote leadership through a scholars programme, governance though public lectures and advocacy and also ensuring sustainable development and growth through empowerment, advocacy and partnerships with other companies.

== Political career ==
Between 1979 and 1981 Mpiani served as a member of the Ghanaian parliament in the only parliament in the 3rd Republic with Hilla Limann as president. During this period he was an active member of Finance Committee and the Economic Committee of parliament.

After the military coup of December 31, 1981 by Jerry Rawlings, Mpiani went into political exile, first in the Ivory Coast and later in Great Britain. He returned to Ghana only after the end of the military dictatorship in 1992 under the then elected President Jerry Rawlings.

From 2005 to 2009, Mpiani served as Minister for President's Affairs and Chief of Staff of the Presidency of President John Agyekum Kufuor. He had oversight of the aviation sector from 2005 to 2006. In April 2006, a whole ministry was created and Gloria Akuffo was appointed Minister of Aviation whilst Mpiani remained Minister for President's Affairs and Chief of Staff.

== See also ==
- Chief of Staff (Ghana)
