= Kwame Addo-Kufuor =

Ghanaian politician and physician

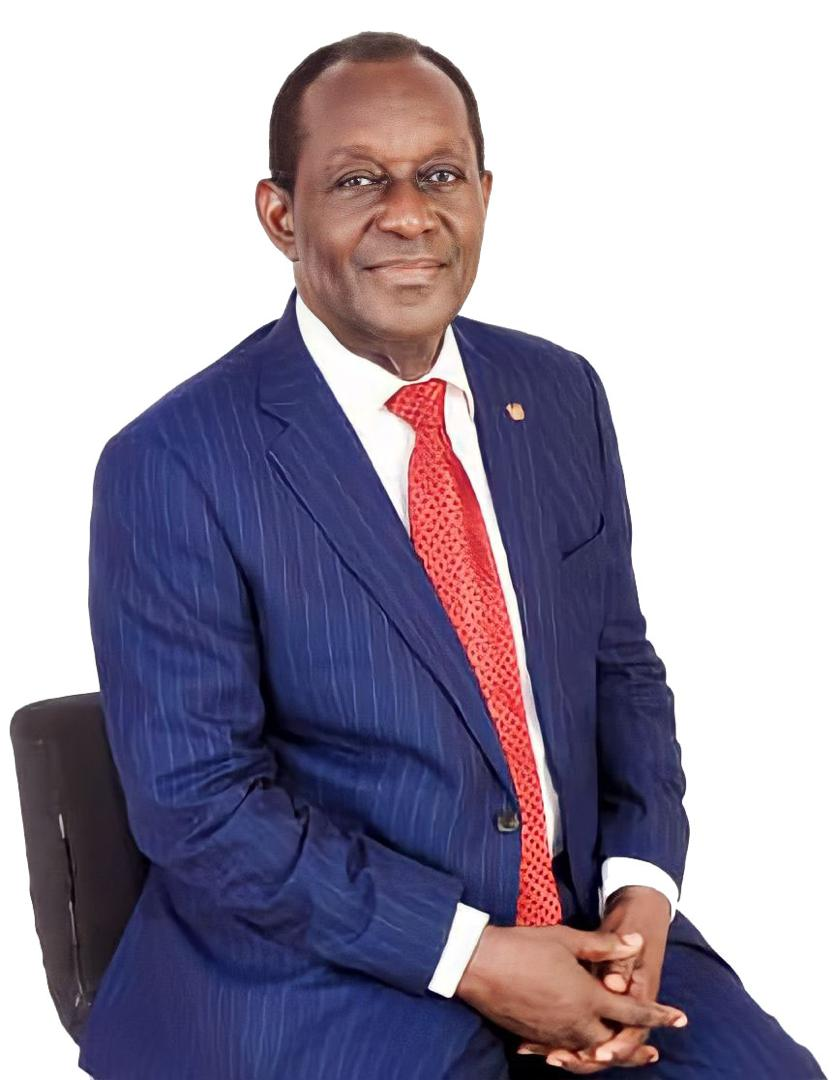

Member of Parliament for Manhyia
- In office 7 January 1997 – 7 January 2009
- Succeeded by: Mathew Opoku Prempeh
- Preceded by: Kwamena Bartels

Minister of the Interior
- In office 2008–2009
- President: John Kufuor
- Preceded by: Albert Kan-Dapaah
- Succeeded by: Cletus Avoka

Minister for Defence
- In office January 2001 – 2008
- President: John Kufuor
- Preceded by: Lt. Col. E. K. T. Donkoh

Personal details
- Born: 14 July 1940 (age 86) Kumasi, Ghana
- Party: New Patriotic Party
- Spouse: Rosemary Addo-Kufuor
- Relations: John Kufuor - brother
- Children: Kwame Addo-Kufuor, Kojo Addo-Kufuor & Nana Ama Poku
- Education: Osei Tutu Senior High School,Achimota School; Jesus College, Cambridge
- Profession: Medical doctor

Kwame Addo-Kufuor (born 14 July 1940) is a Ghanaian politician and physician. He is the chancellor of Kumasi Technical University. Addo-Kufuor was a member of parliament for Manhyia and from 2001 to 2007, he was the minister for defence under President John Kufuor, his brother. Between June 2008 and 2009, he was the Minister for Interior.

== Early life and education ==
Addo-Kufuor had his early education at Asem Boys School in Kumasi, Osei Tutu Senior High School and Achimota School in Accra. He is a product of University of Cambridge and the University College Medical School in London. He holds a bachelor of medicine and bachelor of surgery from the schools. He was a student and member of staff at the Middlesex Medical School Hospital and Jesus College.

== Career ==
After qualifying as a practitioner in 1970, Addo-Kufuor worked at Suffolk and St. Charles Hospital in Londons in London until 1971 when he returned to Ghana to work as a medical officer at the Korlebu Teaching Hospital. In 1973, he returned to London for further studies and graduated two years later in 1975. After further works at various hospitals in England, he returned to Ghana to work at Komfo Anokye Teaching Hospital. Later, he founded the Kufuor Hospital at Adum in Kumasi and also lectured at the Department of Medicine, KNUST. Addo Kufuor is a fellow of the Royal Society of Tropical Medicine, Royal College of Physicians, London and West African College of Physicians. He was president of the Ghana Medical Association from 1992 to 1995.

== Political career ==
Addo-Kufuor is a founding member of the New Patriotic Party. He became a member of parliament in January 1997 after emerging as a winner in the General Election in December 1996. He was re-elected in the 2000 and 2008 elections as the member of parliament for the Manhyia constituency. He did not seek re-election in the next election in 2008, bringing an end his dozen-year career as a legislator.

Addo Kufuor was a member of National Policy and Advisory Committee, a member of the National Executive Council, and National Council of the New Patriotic Party. As chairperson of the Party's national Campaign Policy on health for the campaign of election 2000, he drafted the party's manifesto on health.

== Elections ==
=== 1997 Parliamentary Elections ===
Addo Kufuor was first elected into Parliament during the December 1996 Ghanaian General Elections for the Manhyia Constituency in the Ashanti Region. He polled 59,227 votes out of the 72,789 valid votes cast representing 63.30% against Yaw Addai Boadu an NDC member who polled 13,562 representing 14.50%. He was re-elected with 64,067 votes out of the 78,368 valid votes cast representing 81.80% against Samuel B.Donkoh an NDC member who polled 12,244 votes representing 15.60%, Salifu Mumuni and PNC member who polled 1,614 votes representing 2.10% and Nana O. Boateng who polled 443 votes representing 0.60%.

=== 2004 Parliamentary Elections ===
Addo-Kufuor was re-elected to parliament to represent the Manhyia constituency in the 2004 Ghanaian general elections. His constituency was part of the 36 parliamentary seats out of 39 seats won by the New Patriotic Party in that election for the Ashanti Region. The New Patriotic Party won a total of 128 parliamentary seats out of 230 seats. He was elected with 66,210 votes out of 87,629 total valid votes cast. This was equivalent to 75.6% of total valid votes cast. He was elected over Salifu Mumuni of the People's National Convention, Kwame Boateng of the National Democratic Congress, E. A. Ohene Darko of the Convention People's Party, and Kofi Pervical Akpaloo, an independent candidate. These obtained 667, 9,550, 498 and 10,704 votes respectively of total votes cast.4,6 These were equivalent to 0.8%, 10.9%, 0.6% and 12.2% respectively of total valid votes cast.

== Defence Minister ==
Addo Kufuor was appointed defense minister during his brother, John Kufuor's presidency. He served in that role from the year 2001 to June 2007. During his tenure as minister of defense, he instituted the Armed Forces Open Day, an event observed annually and meant to foster cordiality between the military and civilian population. He also oversaw the construction of the second phase of the 37 Military Hospital and the upgrading of the facility to a postgraduate teaching hospital. He also introduced postgraduate programs at Armed Forces Defense and Staff College. He led the construction of a new office complex for the Ministry of Defense.

=== Acting Interior Minister ===
In 2002, following the murder of Yakubu II and the resultant resignation of Interior Minister Malik Alhassan Yakubu, Addo Kufuor was directed by John Kufuor to act as interior minister alongside his role as defense minister. As acting interior minister, he transformed the prison condition for inmates, introducing better hygiene condition and impressing on the Prison Service Council to increase the financial allocation for meals for prisoners. He also introduced education in some prison facilities.

== SSNIT Board Chairman ==
Upon the coming into power of the NPP in 2017, Addo Kufuor was appointed as board chairman for Social Security and National Insurance Trust (SSNIT). He served in this position until 2021 when the trust's board was reconstituted and Elizabeth Ohene succeeded him. At SSNIT, he restored confidence in the trust through his accountable and transparent leadership. As a result of his style, he was singled out for commendation by Auditor General, Daniel Domelevu, who described him as an exceptional public servant. Domelevu said while public servants were scared and running away from audits, Addo Kufuor voluntarily submitted himself and his office as Board Chairman of SSNIT to audits.

== Chancellor of Kumasi Technical University ==
In September 2022, Addo Kufuor was installed as the first-ever Chancellor of the Kumasi Technical University. At his investiture, Addo Kufuor pledged to offer the needed support to authorities to transform the university to one of the topmost TVET institutions for Information Communication and Technology in Ghana.

As chancellor, he instituted the Addo Kufuor's Prize for best ICT student to encourage innovation and the studies of technology. He personally funds the awards with support from Kweku Oteng, chief executive officer of the Angel Group of Companies. He also managed to get Agyaba Jewellery to establish a workshop at the university's Adako Jachie's campus to give hands-on training to students and prepare them for the market. His effort has also led to the university signing MOU with some leading industries to provide space for practical and industrial training of students. He has also led the university to sign MOU with Ghana Oil Company Limited (GOIL) for the establishment of a Lube Bay at the Amakom Campus to provide practical training for automotive engineering students.

== Honours ==
Addo Kufuor is a recipient of the Order of the Volta (Companion) from the Government of Ghana for his contribution to healthcare in the country. In 2006, he was awarded a gold medal by the Ghana Medical and Dental Council for his distinguished medical practice.

In July 2020, he was adjudged 2019 Outstanding Board Chairman of the year for his role at SSNIT at the 10th Entrepreneur and Corporate Executive Awards. In 2020, he was honoured by the National Pensioners Association for his contribution to the welfare of pensioners.

== Personal life ==
Addo-Kufuor, is a Christian and married to Rosemary Addo Kufuor with whom they have three children including, Kwame Addo-Kufuor, Kojo Addo-Kufuor and Nana Ama Poku. His brother, John Kufuor, was Ghana's president from January 2001 to January 2009.

== Bibliography ==
- Kwame Addo-Kufuor: Gold Coast Boy (A Memoir). Digibooks Ghana Ltd, 2015, ISBN 978-9988-2-1913-0.

Parliament of Ghana
Preceded by William Kwaku Asante	Member of Parliament for Manhyia; 1997 – 2009	Succeeded by Mathew Opoku Prempeh
Political offices
Preceded by Colonel Enoch K.T. Donkoh	Minister for Defence; 2001 – 2007	Succeeded by Albert Kan Dapaah
Preceded by Kwamena Bartels	Minister for Interior; 2008 – 2009	Succeeded by Cletus Avoka
