= E. M. Osei-Wusu =

Ghanaian politician and military commander

Emmanuel M. Osei-Wusu (23 August 1933 - 2016) was a former Ghanaian politician and military commander. He was Minister of the Interior from 1992–1996 in the Rawlings government.

== Military appointments ==
- Officer commanding forces movement control, 2nd Infantry Battalion, 162
- Staff captain movement, Ministry of Defense, June 1962 – 1963
- Staff officer Quartermaster General, June 1963 – 1965
- Assistant Adjutant Quartermaster General (movement) December 1965-April 1966
- Commanding Officer 6th Infantry Battalion, April–November 1968
- Commanding Officer 3rd Infantry Battalion, November–December 1968
- Commanding Officer 4th Infantry Battalion, August 1970-June 1971
- Brigade Commander, 2nd Infantry Brigade Group (Central Command), June 1971-August 1972

After he and other NDC politicians were accused of corruption by NPP opponents, and investigated by the CHRAJ, he stepped aside from politics.

He retired to his hometown of Pepease, Kwahu, where he lived a solitary life. Osei Wusu died in 2016.

Political offices
Preceded by Maj. Gen. Winston Mensa-Wood	Secretary for Interior; 1992 – 1993	Succeeded by self
Preceded by self	Minister for Interior; 1993 – 1996	Succeeded by ?
