= Chief of Staff (Ghana) =

Primary aide-de-camp of the president

The Chief of Staff of Ghana is the coordinator of the supporting staff and the primary aide-de-camp of the President of Ghana.The chief of staff provides a buffer between the President and that executive's direct-reporting team. The chiefs of staff also acts as a confidant and advisor to the President, acting as a sounding board for ideas.

== Chiefs of Staff of Ghana ==
Name	Profession	Period	President served
LT. COL. S. B Baryeh	Military officer	January 1992- July 1997	Jerry John Rawlings
Nana Ato Dadzie	Lawyer, Politician	July 1997- January 2001	Jerry John Rawlings
Jake Obetsebi-Lamptey	Media Executive, Politician	January 2001 - 2001	John Kufuor
Kwadwo Mpiani	Financial consultant, Politician	2001 - January 2009	John Agyekum Kufuor
John Henry Martey Newman	Lawyer, administrator	January 2009 - January 2013	John Atta Mills, John Dramani Mahama
Prosper Douglas Bani	International development manager	January 2013 - February 2015	John Dramani Mahama
Julius Debrah	Politician	February 2015 - January 2017	John Dramani Mahama
Akosua Frema Osei-Opare	Politician	January 2017 - January 2025	Nana Addo Dankwa Akufo-Addo
Julius Debrah	Politician	January 2025-	John Dramani Mahama
