= Kwamena Ahwoi =

Ghanaian academic and politician

Minister for Planning and Regional Economic Co-operation and Integration
- In office January 2000 – January 2001
- President: Jerry Rawlings
- Preceded by: New Ministry
- Succeeded by: Kofi Konadu Apraku

22nd Minister for Foreign Affairs (Ghana)
- In office April 1997 – December 1997
- President: Jerry Rawlings
- Preceded by: Obed Asamoah
- Succeeded by: James Victor Gbeho

Minister for Local Government and Rural Development
- In office March 1993 – January 2000
- President: Jerry Rawlings
- Preceded by: William Yeboah
- Succeeded by: Cecilia Johnson

Personal details
- Born: 13 October 1951 (age 75) Winneba, Ghana
- Party: National Democratic Congress
- Relations: Kwesi Ahwoi, Ato Ahwoi
- Education: University of Oxford
- Profession: Academic, Lawyer

Kwamena Ahwoi (born 13 October 1951) is a Ghanaian academic and politician, who served as Minister for Local Government and Rural Development from 1990 to 2001 in the National Democratic Congress (NDC) government, during the reign of Jerry Rawlings. He also briefly served as Minister of Foreign Affairs in 1997, and was acting minister in that department during much of the 1990s.

== Early life and education ==
He was born on Saturday 13 October 1951 at South Suntreso, Kumasi. He has eight siblings, among them is Kwasi Ahwoi and Ato Ahwoi. He has two brothers and five sisters. He is a Fante Sefwi and the fourth child of eight children. His mother died in January 2020 at the age of 97 but his father died when he was still a young boy.

He had his upbringing in Kumasi. He pursued his 'O level' at the Okuapeman School at Akropong Akuapem. He later continued to Opoku Ware School.

From 1971 to 1974, Prof. Ahwoi was enrolled at the faculty of law at the University of Ghana. He studied Bachelor of Civil Law (BCL) on a Rhodes Scholarship at Oxford University as his post-graduate course in 1975.

== Career ==
He became a full-time lecturer at the University of Ghana in the faculty of law from 1982 to 1993. On 31 December 1981, he was moderating a new year class in Legon when Jerry John Rawlings asked him to report to the Gonda Barracks of the Ghana armed Forces join the PNDC. After spending time in politics he went back into academia, he is currently a lecturer at the Ghana Institute of Management and Public Administration, a tertiary institution in Ghana. Ahwoi is a Governance Professor at the Ghana Institute of Management and Public Administration (GIMPA) School of Governance and Leadership.

== Politics ==
Between January and August 1982, he acted as the special aide to Chairman Jerry John Rawlings and his first major assignment was to join a delegation and negotiate with President Shehu Shagari of Nigeria to restore oil supply to Ghana. President Shehu Shagari had truncated oil supplies to Ghana in protest of the 4 June revolution. Obed Asamoah

From 1982 to 1987, he managed the Judicial, and Quasal arms of the 4 June Revolution. Being among 27 people selected to develop a roadmap for development as the country was preparing to move into its Fourth Republic. They developed the District Political Authority and Modalities for District Level Election which was popularly called the 'Blue Book'.

In the mid-1980s, he served as Director of the Office of Revenue Commissioners, Investigations and Tribunals between 1982 and 1988.

He was Secretary for Local Government and Rural Development and also acted as the acting secretary for Foreign Affairs during the PNDC regime. During his term in the office of foreign affairs, he attempted to unify the NDC with the National Reform Party in 2, and he sent troops to join the Nigerian-led ECOMOG in quelling the Sierra Leone Civil War after a coup in 1997. After the NDC lost in the election of 2000, Ahwoi was critical of the new New Patriotic Party government, and worked to reduce factionalism in the NDC. In 2005, he resigned as director of research for the NDC.

== Author ==
As an academic and a knowledgeable politician Ahwoi has written four books in relation to local governance, decentralisation and history in Ghana's politics.

=== Books ===
- Decentralisation in Ghana: A Collection of Essays
- Enhancing the Decentralisation Programme: District Assemblies and Sub-structures as Partners in Governance
- Local Government and Decentralization in Ghana
- Working with Rawlings

== Personal life ==
He is married with 4 children.

== See also ==
- Kwesi Ahwoi
- Ato Ahwoi

Political offices
Preceded by William H. Yeboah	Minister for Local Government and Rural Development; 1993 – 2000	Succeeded by Cecilia Johnson
Preceded by Dr. Obed Asamoah	Foreign Minister (acting)^{1} 1997	Succeeded by James Victor Gbeho
New title	Minister for Planning and Regional Economic Co-operation and Integration ? – 2001	Succeeded by Dr. Kofi Konadu Apraku
