= J. H. Owusu Acheampong =

Ghanaian politician

Joseph Henry Owusu Acheampong

Member of Parliament for Berekum Constituency
- In office 7 January 1993 – 6 January 2001
- President: Jerry John Rawlings

Personal details
- Born: 1941
- Died: 13 June 2017 (aged 75–76)
- Education: Kwame Nkrumah University of Science and Technology
- Occupation: Agricultural Economist

Hon. Joseph Henry Owusu-Acheampong (1941–2017) was a Ghanaian politician who served as Member of Parliament for Berekum, Regional Secretary for the Brong-Ahafo Region, Majority Leader and Minister for Parliamentary Affairs, Minister for Food and Agriculture, and Member of the Council of State.

A founding member of the National Democratic Congress, and a social-democrat, J.H. Owusu-Acheampong is regarded as one of Ghana's most revered and astute legislators. As Majority Leader, he worked to rebuild parliamentary institutions and practices. One of only two members of the 1st Parliament of the 4th Republic who had previous experience as a Member of Parliament from the 3rd Republic, J.H. Owusu-Acheampong mentored most of his fellow members Parliament of the 4th Republic. He made a visible contribution to nurturing and building a strong legislative branch to effectively check the executive branch of government.

== Early life ==
J H Owusu-Acheampong was born on 23 August 1941 to parents Kofi Keremeh and Abena Donkor, at Biadan in the Brong-Ahafo region of Ghana. He attended Biadan Methodist Primary; Berekum Catholic School for Boys, and Saint Augustine's College. He obtained his BSc in agriculture from Kwame Nkrumah University of Science and Technology where he was elected President of the Student Representative Council. He was awarded an MSc in Agricultural Economics at Wye College.

== Political career ==
JH Owusu-Acheampong was appointed by the Provisional National Defense Council to serve as the Regional Secretary of the Brong-Ahafo Region. After consulting with his mentors Nana Yiadom Boakye Owusu II (Omanhene of Berekum) and Mr. Victor Owusu he accepted the position and served from 1988 - 1993. He was elected into the first parliament of the fourth republic of Ghana on 7 January 1993 after he was pronounced winner at the 1992 Ghanaian parliamentary election held on 29 December 1992. He was elected as Majority Leader of the House and also appointed Minister for Parliamentary Affairs and served in cabinet. He served in this capacity from 1993-1996.

He was re-elected into the second parliament of the fourth republic of Ghana on 7 January 1997 after he emerged winner at the 1996 Ghanaian General Elections. He defeated Michael Kojo Adusah of the New Patriotic Party by obtaining 41.30% of the total votes cast while his opposition obtained 28.70%. He continued in the role as Majority Leader and Minister for Parliamentary Affairs from 1997 - 1998. He was then appointed as Minister for Food and Agriculture 1998 - 2000 and served in cabinet.

After his party lost power in the year 2000, he remained active as a leader in re-organizing the party to come back to power. He was the campaign manager to the then candidate, the late Prof. JEA Mills during the 2008 elections which brought the NDC back to power. He was elected to serve on the Council of State from 2009 - 2013. JH Owusu-Acheampong was a founding member of the NDC party and one of the most respected politicians in Ghana's history. Until his untimely death, he was one of the Council of Elders of the NDC party.

== Personal life ==
Acheampong died on 13 June 2017.

He was married to Stella Owusu-Acheampong. They have four children, Kwabena Owusu-Acheampong, Adwoa Owusu-Acheampong, Kwame Owusu-Acheampong and Kwasi Owusu-Acheampong.
