= Richard Kwame Peprah =

Ghanaian politician

Richard Kwame Peprah is a former Ghanaian politician. Peprah served in the Government of Ghana from 1983 to 2001 in the Rawlings government. He was educated at Achimota School

== Ministerial positions held ==
He served in the capacity of Minister of Mines and Energy from 1993 to 1995 and as a Minister of Finance from 1995 to 2001. He is an independent director of Skipper Ghana.

Preceded by Edward Salia	Minister of Mines and Energy of Ghana; 1993-1995	Succeeded by Kwaku Afriyie
Preceded by Kwesi Botchwey	Finance Minister of Ghana; 1995-2001	Succeeded by Yaw Osafo-Maafo
