= Victor Gbeho =

Ghanaian lawyer and diplomat (1935–2026)

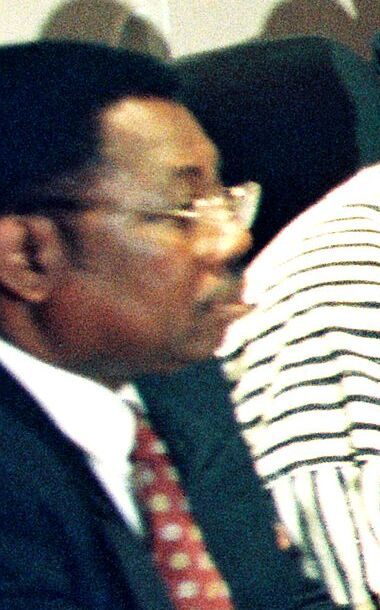

President of the ECOWAS Commission
- In office 18 February 2010 – 1 March 2012
- Preceded by: Mohamed Ibn Chambas
- Succeeded by: Kadré Désiré Ouedraogo

Minister of Foreign Affairs
- In office 7 January 1997 – 7 January 2001
- President: Jerry John Rawlings
- Preceded by: Obed Asamoah
- Succeeded by: Hackman Owusu-Agyeman

Member of Parliament for Anlo Constituency
- In office 7 January 2001 – 6 January 2005
- President: John Kufuor

Personal details
- Born: James Victor Gbeho; 12 January 1935 Keta, Gold Coast
- Died: 13 June 2026 (aged 91)
- Party: National Democratic Congress
- Parent: Philip Gbeho (father)

James Victor Gbeho (12 January 1935 – 13 June 2026) was a Ghanaian lawyer and diplomat who was President of the ECOWAS Commission from 2010 to 2012, to which position he was unanimously elected at the 37th Summit of the Authority of Heads of State and Government of the 15 Member States.

Gbeho was Ghana's Minister of Foreign Affairs from 1997 to 2001, under President Jerry Rawlings, and he was the Member of Parliament for the Anlo constituency from January 2001 to January 2005. He was subsequently a foreign policy advisor to the government of President John Atta Mills. Before his retirement as a career diplomat and politician, Gbeho worked in the Ghana Foreign and Commonwealth Service and served in various capacities at Ghana's diplomatic missions abroad. His postings included the Ghana missions in China, India, Nigeria, Germany, United Kingdom and Switzerland.

He was Deputy High Commissioner to the Court of St. James's (UK) from 1972 until 1976, Ambassador and Permanent Representative of Ghana to the European offices of the United Nations in Geneva (1978–80), with concurrent accreditation to UNIDO in Vienna, Austria, and was Ghana's Permanent Representative to the United Nations in New York City from 1980 to 1990, concurrently accredited to Cuba, Jamaica, and to Trinidad and Tobago.

In July 1994, the UN Secretary-General appointed him as special representative to Somalia. In September 1995 Jerry Rawlings, as chairman of ECOWAS, appointed Gbeho as ECOWAS special representative for Liberia.

== Education ==
Educated at Achimota School, he is the son of the musician Philip Gbeho.

== Politics ==
Gbeho was the member of parliament of the Anlo constituency in the 3rd parliament of the 4th republic of Ghana as an independent candidate. He was elected as the member of parliament for the Anlo constituency in the 2000 Ghanaian general elections, for which he was an independent candidate. His constituency was the second independent candidate to win the said election in the Volta Region.

He was elected with 19,083 votes out of 28,156 total valid votes cast. This was equivalent to 68.2% of the total valid votes cast.

Gbeho was elected over Clend M. Kwasi Sowu of the National Democratic Congress, Esther llan A. Nyamalor an independent candidate, Godwin Kwaku Defeamekpor of the New Patriotic Party, Clemence Kwami Abotsi of the Convention People's Party, Cornelius Kofi Binewoatsor of the National Reformed Party, Prince Richard Abotsi of the United Ghana Movement, and independent candidate Goyimwole Enukomeko Kpodo. These obtained 4,223, 3,800, 327, 249, 162, 118 and 0 votes respectively out of the total valid votes cast. These were equivalent to 15.1%, 13.6%, 1.2%, 0.9%, 0.6% and 0.4% respectively of total valid votes cast.

== Death ==
Gbeho died on 13 June 2026, at the age of 91.

Political offices
Preceded by Kwamena Ahwoi	Foreign Minister; 1997–2001	Succeeded by Hackman Owusu-Agyeman
Preceded by Mohamed Ibn Chambas	President of the ECOWAS Commission; 2010–2012	Succeeded by Kadré Désiré Ouedraogo
Parliament of Ghana
Preceded by Squadron Leader Clend M. Sowu	Member of Parliament for Anlo; 2001–2005	Succeeded by Clement Kofi Humado
Diplomatic posts
Preceded by Van H. Sekyi	Permanent Representatives to the United Nations; 1980–1990	Succeeded by George Lamptey
