= List of Akufo-Addo government ministers and political appointees =

List of Akufo Addo Government Ministers

This is a listing of the ministers who are currently serving in the New Patriotic Party government of Nana Addo Dankwa Akufo-Addo in Ghana originally formed on 7 January 2017 following the winning of the December 2016 general election when Nana Akufo-Addo of the New Patriotic Party became president.

== Ministers ==
Government 2017 to 2025
Office(s)	Officeholder	Term
President	Nana Addo Dankwa Akufo-Addo	January 7, 2017 – January 6, 2025
Vice President	Mahamudu Bawumia	January 7, 2017 – January 6, 2025
Sector Ministers^{Note 1}
Office(s)	Officeholder	Term
Ministry of Trade and Industry	Kobina Tahir Hammond (MP)Alan John Kyerematen Carlos Kingsley Ahenkorah (MP) (Deputy minister); Robert Ahomka-Lindsey (Deputy minister)	24 March 2023 - Incumbent January 27, 2017 – January 16, 2023 (nominated) (nominated)
Ministry of Finance	Hon. Mohammed Amin Adams Ken Ofori-Atta; Kwaku Kwarteng (Deputy minister); Abena Osei Asare (MP) (Deputy minister) Dr Stephen Amoah; Charles Adu Boahen (Minister of State, Finance)	February 2024 – January 27, 2017 – February 2024 (nominated) (nominated) (nominated)
Ministry of Defence	Dominic Nitiwul; Derrick Oduro (Maj.) (Deputy minister)	January 27, 2017 – (nominated)
Ministry of The Interior	Ambrose Dery; Henry Quartey (Deputy minister)	January 27, 2017 – (nominated)
Ministry of Energy and Petroleum	John Peter Amewu Boakye Agyarko Owuraku Aidoo (Deputy minister); Joseph Cudjoe (Deputy minister); Mohammed Amin Adam (Deputy minister)	August 2018- January 27, 2017 –August 2018 (nominated) (nominated) (nominated)
Office of Attorney General and Ministry of Justice	Gloria Akuffo; Godfred Dame (Deputy minister); Joseph Dindiok Kpemka (Deputy minister)	January 27, 2017 – (nominated) (nominated)
Ministry of Foreign Affairs	Shirley Ayorkor Botwe (MP); Mohammed Habbib Tijani (Deputy minister); Charles Owiredu (Deputy minister)	January 29, 2017 - (nominated) (nominated)
Ministry of Food and Agriculture	Owusu Afriyie Akoto (MP); Bryan Acheampong (MP); William Agyapong Quaitoo (Deputy minister); Sagre Bambangi (Deputy minister); George Oduro (Deputy minister)	January 27, 2017 – 24 March 2023 - Incumbent (nominated) - August 29, 2017 (nominated) (nominated)
Ministry of Education	Matthew Opoku-Prempeh Yaw Osei Adutwum (Deputy minister)	January 27, 2017 – (nominated) (nominated)
Ministry of Health	Kwaku Agyemang-Manu; Dr Bernard Oko-Boye(MP) (Deputy minister); Tina Gifty Naa Ayele Mensah (Deputy minister)	January 27, 2017 – (nominated) (nominated)
Ministry of Monitoring and Evaluation (Ghana)	Anthony Akoto Osei; William Kwasi Sabi (Deputy minister)	February 7, 2017 – (nominated)
Ministry of Regional Reorganization and Development (Ghana)	Dan Kweku Botwe (MP); Martin Agyei-Mensah Korsah (Deputy minister)	February 7, 2017 – (nominated)
Ministry of Lands and Natural Resources	Samuel Abu Jinapor Kwaku Asomah-Cheremeh John Peter Amewu Benito Owusu Bio (Deputy minister); Barbara Oteng Gyasi (Deputy minister)	August 2018- February 7, 2017 –August 2018 (nominated) (nominated)
Ministry of Sanitation and Water Resources (Ghana)	Cecilia Abena Dapaah (MP); Patrick Boamah (Deputy minister); Michael Yaw Gyato (Deputy minister)	August 2018 – 22 July 2023 (nominated) (nominated)
Ministry of Railway Development (Ghana)	Joe Ghartey; Kwaku Agyenim Boateng (Deputy minister); Andy Appiah-Kubi (Deputy minister)	February 7, 2017 – (nominated) (nominated)
Ministry of Employment and Labour Relations	Ignatius Bafuor Awuah (MP); Bright Wireko Brobbey (Deputy minister)	February 7, 2017 – (nominated)
Ministry of Transport	Kweku Ofori Asiamah; Nii Kwartei Titus Glover (Deputy minister)	February 7, 2017 – (nominated)
Ministry of Tourism, Culture and Creative Arts (Ghana)	Catherine Ablema Afeku (MP); Mark Okraku-Mantey (Deputy minister)	February 10, 2017 – (nominated)
Ministry of Special Development Initiative (Ghana)	Mavis Hawa Koomson (MP)	February 10, 2017 –
Senior Minister (Ghana)	Yaw Osafo-Maafo	January 27, 2017 –
Ministry of Environment, Science and Technology	Kwabena Frimpong-Boateng; Patricia Appiagyei (Deputy minister)	February 7, 2017 – (nominated)
National Security Ministry (Ghana)	Albert Kan-Dapaah	January 27, 2017 –
Ministry of Youth and Sports	Isaac Kwame Asiamah (MP); Pius Enam Hadzide (Deputy minister)	February 10, 2017 – (nominated)
Ministry of Local Government and Rural Development (Ghana)	Alima Mahama; Osei Bonsu Amoah (Deputy minister); Collins Ntim (Deputy minister); Kwasi Boateng Agyei (Deputy minister)	January 27, 2017 – (nominated) (nominated) (nominated)
Ministry of Works and Housing (Ghana)	Samuel Atta Akyea (MP); Freda Prempeh (Deputy minister); Eugene Antwi (Deputy minister) Barbara Asher Ayisi(Deputy minister)	February 7, 2017 – (nominated) (nominated)
Ministry of Communication	Ursula Owusu Ekuful (MP); George Andah (Deputy minister); Vincent Sowah Odotei (Deputy minister)	February 7, 2017 – (nominated) (nominated)
Ministry of Information	Fatimatu Abubakar Kojo Oppong Nkrumah Mustapha Abdul-Hamid Ama Dokuaa Asiamah Adjei (Deputy minister); Perry Curtis Kwabla Okudzeto (Deputy minister)	February 2024 – August 2018- February 2024 February 10, 2017 –August 2018 (nominated) (nominated)
Ministry of Roads and Highways	Francis Asenso-Boakye Kwesi Amoako Atta; Kwabena Owusu Aduomi (MP) (Deputy minister); Anthony N-Yoh Puowele Karbo (MP) (Deputy minister)	February 2024 – February 7, 2017 – February 2024 (nominated) (nominated)
Ministry of Gender, Children and Social Protection	Cynthia Morrison Otiko Afisa Djaba Gifty Twum Ampofo (Deputy minister)	November 2018- February 7, 2017 –August 2018 (nominated)
Ministry of Planning	George Yaw Gyan-Baffour (Prof.) (MP)	February 10, 2017 –
Ministry of Fisheries And Aquaculture	Elizabeth Afoley Quaye (MP); Francis Kingsley Ato Cudjoe (Deputy minister)	February 10, 2017 – ? (nominated)
Ministry for Chieftaincy and Religious Affairs (Ghana)	Kofi Dzamesi; Stephen Asamoah Boateng (MP); Paul Essien (Deputy minister)	February 10, 2017 – 2023; 24 March 2023 - Incumbent (nominated)
Ministry of Inner cities and Zongo Development (Ghana)	Abubakar Boniface Siddique (MP) Mustapha Abdul-Hamid	February 10, 2017 –August 2018 August 2018-
Ministry of Business Development	Ibrahim Mohammed Awal	February 10, 2017 –
Minister for Parliamentary Affairs (Ghana)	Osei Kyei Mensah Bonsu (MP)	February 10, 2017 –
Ministry of Aviation	Joseph Kofi Koddi Adda; Kwabena O. Darko-Mensah (Deputy minister)	August 2018– (nominated)
Ministers of State
Office(s)	Officeholder	Term
Minister of State at the Office of the President in charge of Public Procurement	Sarah Adwoa Safo^{Note 2}	April 4, 2017 –
Minister of State at the Ministry of Education in charge of Tertiary Education	Kwesi Yankah (Prof.)	April 4, 2017 –
Minister of State at the Ministry of Agriculture	Nurah Gyeile	April 4, 2017 –
Minister of State at the Office of the President	Bryan Acheampong (MP)	April 4, 2017 –
Regional Ministers
Region	Officeholder	Term
Ashanti Regional Minister	Simon Osei-Mensah; Elizabeth Agyeman (Deputy minister)	February 19, 2017 – (nominated)
Brong Ahafo Region	Kweku Asomah-Cheremeh; Evans Opoku (Deputy minister)	February 19, 2017 – (nominated)
Central Region	Kwamena Duncan; Thomas Agyei Baffour (Deputy minister)	February 19, 2017 – (nominated)
Eastern Region	Kwakye Darfour; Joseph Tetteh (MP) (Nkansah Sampson)	February 19, 2017 – (nominated)
Greater Accra Regional Minister	Ishmael Ashitey; Elizabeth Kwatsoo Tetteh Sackey (Deputy minister)	February 19, 2017 – (nominated)
Northern Region	Salifu Saeed; Solomon Namliit Boar (MP) (Deputy minister)	February 19, 2017 – (nominated)
Upper East Region	Alhassan Samari; Frank Fuseini Adongo (MP) (Deputy minister)	February 19, 2017 – (nominated)
Upper West Region	Sulemana Alhassan; Amidu Ishaq (Deputy minister)	February 19, 2017 – (nominated)
Volta Regional Minister	Archibald Letsa; Maxwell Blagogee (Deputy minister)	February 19, 2017 – (nominated)
Western Region	Kwaku Afriyie; Eugenia Gifty Kusi (Deputy minister)	February 19, 2017 – (nominated)

== Local Government Administration ==
Local government administrators
Region	Assembly	Administrative subdivision	Chief Executive	Term
Greater Accra Region	Accra	Metropolitan	Mohammed Adjei Sowah	(nominated)
Ashanti Region	Kumasi	Metropolitan	Osei Assibey Antwi	(nominated)
Western Region	Secondi/Takoradi	Metropolitan	Anthony K. K. Sam	(nominated)
Northern Region	Tamale	Metropolitan	Iddrisu Musa	(nominated)
Northern Region	Bole	District	Alele Veronica Herming	(nominated)
Ashanti Region	Ahafo Ano North		Martina Appiah-Nyantakyi	(nominated)
Ashanti Region	Ejisu-Juaben		Beatrice Serwah Derkyi	(nominated)
Ashanti Region	Sekyere East		Mary Boatemaa Marfo	(nominated)
Ashanti Region	Nkansah Sampson		Catherine Reckling	(nominated)
Brong-Ahafo Region	Banda		Mary Okone	(nominated)
Brong-Ahafo Region	Dormaa West		Mary Ameyaa	(nominated)
Brong-Ahafo Region	Nkoranza North		Gifty Akosa Arthur	(nominated)
Brong-Ahafo Region	Nkoranza South		Diana Attaa-Kusiwaa	(nominated)
Brong-Ahafo Region	Sunyani East	Municipal	Evelyn Amma Kumi Richardson	May 5, 2017 -
Brong-Ahafo Region	Tain		Charity Foriwaa Dwommoh	(nominated)
Central Region	Abura/Asebu/Kwamankese		Felicia Aba Hagan	(nominated)
Central Region	Agona West	Municipal	Justina Marigold Assan	May 5, 2017 -
Eastern Region	Ayensuano		Florence Governor	(nominated)
Eastern Region	New Juaben		Comfort Asante	(nominated)
Eastern Region	Suhum		Margaret Darko	(nominated)
Greater Accra Region	Ada East		Sarah Dugbakie Pobee	(nominated)
Greater Accra Region	Ga East		Janet Tulasu Mensah	(nominated)
Greater Accra Region	La Dade Kotopon		Gladys Mann Dedey	(nominated)
Greater Accra Region	La Nkwantanang Madina		Jennifer Dede Afagbedzi	(nominated)
Greater Accra Region	Ledzokuku-Kwowor	Municipal	Adjeley Twum Gyamrah	May 15, 2017 -
Northern Region	Sagnarigu		Mariama Iddrisu	(nominated)
Northern Region	Savelugu-Nanton		Ayishetu Seidu	(nominated)
Northern Region	Tolon		Amama Ayibu	(nominated)
Upper East Region	Bawku East		Victoria Ayamba	(nominated)
Upper East Region	Nabdam		Agnes Anamoo	(nominated)
Upper East Region	Pusiga		Zubeiru Abdulai	(nominated)
Upper West Region	Daffiama Bussie Issa		Nadi Sanda Imoro	(nominated)
Upper West Region	Nadowli		Katherine Lankono	(nominated)
Upper West Region	Jirapa		Christine Bonbbanye-Amadu	(nominated)
Volta Region	Boateng Adaklu		Josphine Ohene	(nominated)
Volta Region	Afadjato South		Wisdom Semanu Seneadza	(nominated)
Volta Region	Agotime-Ziope		David Dickson Dzorkpe	(nominated)
Volta Region	Akatsi North		Prince Sodoke Amuzu	(nominated)
Volta Region	Akatsi South		Leonelson Adzidogah	(nominated)
Volta Region	Biakoye		Millicent Kabuki Carboo	(nominated)
Volta Region	Central Tongu		Thomas Moore Zonyrah	(nominated)
Volta Region	Ho Central		Nelson Akorli	(nominated)
Volta Region	Ho West		Ernest Victor Apau	(nominated)
Volta Region	Hohoe		Andrews Teddy Ofori	(nominated)
Volta Region	Jasikan		Lawrence Aziale	(nominated)
Volta Region	Kadjebi		Maxwell Kofi Asiedu	(nominated)
Volta Region	Keta		Seth Yormewu	(nominated)
Volta Region	Ketu North		Anthony Avorgbedor	(nominated)
Volta Region	Ketu South		Edem Elliot Agbewornu	(nominated)
Volta Region	Kpando		Elvis Kweku Djampoh	(nominated)
Volta Region	Krachi East		Patrick Jilima	(nominated)
Volta Region	Krachi Nchumuru		Appiah Augustine	(nominated)
Volta Region	Krachi West		Douglas Osei Nti	(nominated)
Volta Region	Nkwanta North		Jakayi Jackson	(nominated)
Volta Region	Nkwanta South		John Thasun	(nominated)
Volta Region	North Dayi		Kudjo Edmund Attah	(nominated)
Volta Region	North Tongu		Richard Collins Arku	(nominated)
Volta Region	South Dayi		Elia Boateng	(nominated)
Volta Region	South Tonu		Emmanuel Louis Agama	(nominated)
Western Region	Ahanta West		Henrietta Mary Eyison	(nominated)
Western Region	Juaboso		Martha Kwayie Manu	(nominated)
Western Region	Wasa Amenfi West		Helena Appiah	(nominated)
Upper West Region	Wa	Municipal	Moomin Issahaku Tahiru	May 4, 2017 -
Eastern Region	Akuapem North	Municipal	Denis Edward Aboagye	May 10, 2017 -

== Parliamentary appointments ==
Office(s)	Officeholder	Term
Speaker of Parliament	Alban Kingsford Sumana Bagbin	January 7, 2021 -
First Deputy Speaker of Parliament	Joseph Osei Owusu (MP)	January 7, 2017 -
Majority Leader	Osei Kyei Mensah Bonsu (MP)	January 7, 2017 -
Deputy Majority Leader	Sarah Adwoa Safo (MP)	January 7, 2017 -
Majority Chief Whip	Kwasi Ameyaw-Cheremeh (MP)	January 7, 2017 -

== Government administrative staff ==
Administrative staff
Office(s)	Officeholder	Term
Chief of Staff	Frema Osei-Opare	January 7, 2017 - January 6, 2025
Deputy Chief of Staff	Samuel Abu Jinapor	January 7, 2017 -
Secretary to the Cabinet	Mercy Yvonne Debrah-Karikari	February 14, 2017
Executive Secretary to the president	Nana Bediatuo Asante	January 7, 2017 - January 6, 2025
Director of Communications at the Presidency	Eugene Arhin	January 7, 2017 - January 6, 2025
Deputy Director of Communications at the Presidency	Fatimatu Abubakari	February 16, 2017 -
National security adviser	Emmanuel Okyere (Brig.-Gen.)	January 7, 2017 -
National security coordinator	Joshua Kyeremeh	January 7, 2017 -
Director of Research	Victor Newman	January 7, 2017 -
Political assistant to the president & deputy chief of staff	Francis Asenso-Boakye	January 7, 2017 -
Director of state protocol	Hassan Ahmed	January 7, 2017 -
Director of Operations	Lord Oblitey Commey	January 7, 2017 -
Personal assistant to the president	Saratu Atta	January 7, 2017 -
Presidential staffer	Clara Napaga Tia Sulemana	January 7, 2017 -
Presidential staffer	Charles Bissue	March 10, 2017 -

== Heads of Institutions ==
Office(s)	Officeholder	Term
Director General of National Communications Authority	Joseph Anokye	(appointed)
Director General of Ghana Ports and Harbours Authority	Michael Achagwe Luguje	June 5, 2018-
Executive Secretary of Ghana Free Zones Authority	Michael Okyere Baafi	January 27, 2017 -
Chief Executive Officer of National Petroleum Authority	Hassan Tampuli	January 27, 2017 -
Managing Director of Tema Oil Refinery	Isaac Osei	January 7, 2017 -
Chief Executive Officer of Ghana National Petroleum Corporation	Kofi Koduah Sarpong	January 25, 2017 -
Chief Executive Officer of Bulk Oil Storage and Transportation Company Limited	Edwin Alfred Provencal	August 26, 2019 -
Chief Executive Officer of National Identification Authority	Ken Agyeman Attafuah (Prof.)	January 28, 2017 -
Executive Director of National Service Scheme	Mustapha Ussif	February 6, 2017 -
Deputy Executive Director of National Service Scheme (Operations and Programmes)	Gifty Oware-Aboagye	February 6, 2017 -
Deputy Executive Director of National Service Scheme (Finance and Administration)	Gifty Oware-Aboagye	February 6, 2017 -
Executive Director of the Council for Technical and Vocational Education and Training	Fred Kyei Asamoah	February 6, 2017 -
Commissioner General of Ghana Revenue Authority	Emmanuel Kofi Nti	February 17, 2017 -
Chief Executive Officer of Ghana National Gas Company	Benjamin K. D. Asante	February 1, 2017 -
Coordinator for the National Youth Authority	Sylvester Mensah Tetteh	September 12, 2019 -
Deputy Chief Executive of the National Youth Authority	Nelson Owusu Ansah	September 12, 2019 -
Deputy Chief Executive Officer of the National Youth Authority	Akosua Asaa Manu	September 12, 2019 -
Chief Executive of the Forestry Commission	Kwadwo Owusu Afriyie	February 23, 2017-
Director General of Ghana Health Service	Nsiah Asare	February 23, 2017-
Chief Executive Officer of Microfinance and Small Loans Center	Stephen Amoah	February 23, 2017-
Deputy Executive Secretary of Microfinance and Small Loans Center	Maame Afia Akoto	March 8, 2017 -
Chief Executive Officer of Ghana Oil Company Limited	Kwame Osei-Prempeh	February 23, 2017-
Chief Executive Officer of Driver and Vehicle Licensing Authority	Kwasi Agyemang Busia	February 28, 2017-
Chief Executive Officer of Public Procurement Authority	Agyenim Boateng Agyei	March 9, 2017 -
Director General of National Disaster Management Organisation	Eric Nana Agyeman-Prempeh	March 10, 2017 -
Deputy Director General of National Disaster Management Organisation	Abu Ramadan	March 10, 2017 -
Chief Executive Officer of Food and Drugs Authority	Delese Mimi Darko	March 7, 2017 -
Director of Ghana Standards Authority	Alex Dodoo (Prof.)	July 27, 2017 -
Chief Executive Officer of Ghana Export Import Bank	Lawrence Agyinsam	March 11, 2017 -
President of Creative Arts Council	Mark Okraku-Mantey	March 1, 2017 -
Director of Creative Arts Council	Gyankroma Akufo-Addo	March 1, 2017 -
Secretary of Creative Arts Council	Bibi Bright	March 1, 2017 -
Chief Executive Officer of Ghana Forestry Commission	Kwadwo Owusu Afriyie	March 14, 2017 -
Deputy Commissioner of National Commission for Civic Education	Kathleen Addy	March 15, 2017 -

== Ambassadorial roles ==
Host country	Officeholder	Term
Canada	Ayikoi Otoo	(nominated)
Germany	Gina Blay	June 3, 2017 -
United States of America	Baffour Adjei Bawuah	June 3, 2017 -
United Kingdom	Papa Owusu-Ankomah	June 3, 2017 -
France	Anna Bossman	June 3, 2017 -
China	Edward Boateng	June 3, 2017 -
Nigeria	Rashid Bawa	June 3, 2017 -
Kingdom of Morocco	Stephen Mahamudu Yakubu	June 3, 2017 -
Côte d'Ivoire	Frederick Daniel Laryea	June 3, 2017 -
Republic of Equatorial Guinea	Esther Dzifa Ofori	July 11, 2017 -
Republic of Zambia	Margaret Ekua Prah	July 11, 2017 -
Federative Republic of Brazil	Prof. Abena Pokua Busia	July 11, 2017 -
Republic of Italy	Paulina Patience Abagaye	July 11, 2017 -
Republic of South Africa	George Ayisi-Boateng	July 11, 2017 -
Burkina Faso	Naa Bolinaa Saaka	July 11, 2017 -
Republic of India	Mike Nii Nortey Oquaye jnr	July 11, 2017 -
Kingdom of Saudi Arabia	Sheikh T.B Damba	July 11, 2017 -
Federal Democratic of Ethiopia	William Azuma Awinador Kanyirigi	July 11, 2017 -
Republic of Turkey	Salma Frances Mancell-Egala	July 11, 2017 -
Arab Republic of Egypt	Paul Okoh	July 11, 2017 -
Republic of Malta	Mercy Bampo Addo	July 11, 2017 -
Republic of Togo	Kwasi Owusu-Yeboa	July 11, 2017 -
The Netherlands	Sophia Horner-Sam	July 11, 2017 -
The Kingdom of Denmark	Amerley Ollennu Awua-Asamoa	July 11, 2017 - January 6, 2021
Republic of Namibia	Elizabeth Salamatu Forgor	July 11, 2017 -
Republic of Cuba	Napoleon Abdulai	July 11, 2017 -
Republic of Mali	Gen. Francis Adu-Amanfoh	July 11, 2017 -
Vatican	Joseph Kojo Akudibilah	July 11, 2017 -
Ambassador-at-large	Dr. Edward Nasigiri Mahama	July 11, 2017 -
Ambassador-at-large	Rasheed Seidu Inusa	July 11, 2017 -
Benin	Alowe Leo Kaba	August 2, 2017 -
Republic of Kenya	Francisca Ashietey-Odunton	August 2, 2017 -
Czech Republic	Virginia Hesse	August 2, 2017 - January 6, 2021
South Korea	Dedo Difie Agyarko-Kusi	August 2, 2017 -

== Council of State ==
Officeholder	Term
Stanley Nii Adjiri Blankson	February 27, 2017 -
Sam Okudzeto	February 27, 2017 -
Nana Otuo Siriboe II	February 27, 2017 -
Nana Kofi Obiri Egyir II	February 27, 2017 -
Alberta Cudjoe	February 27, 2017 -
Aminu Amadu	February 27, 2017 -
Margaret Amoakohene	February 27, 2017 -
Sahanun Moqtar	February 27, 2017 -
Georgina Kusi	February 27, 2017 -
Sule Yiremiah	February 27, 2017 -
Joseph Boateng Danquah^{Note 3} (Lt. General, retd)	February 27, 2017 -
Nana Owusu-Nsiah^{Note 4}	February 27, 2017 -
Paa Kofi Ansong	February 27, 2017 -
Togbe Afede XIV^{Note 5}	February 27, 2017 -
Georgina Theodora Wood	June 8, 2017 -

== Other political appointments ==
Office(s)	Officeholder	Term
Special Independent prosecutor of government	Martin Amidu	January 11, 2018 -November 15, 2020
Special Independent prosecutor of government	Kissi Agyebeng	August 5, 2021-
Chief of Defense Staff	Obed Akwa (Lt. General)	March 5, 2017 -
Chief of Army Staff	William Azure Ayamdo (Major General)	March 5, 2017 -
Chief of Air Staff	Maxwell Mantsebi-Tei Nagai (Air Vice Marshal)	January, 2016 -
Chief of Naval Staff	Peter Kofi Faidoo (Rear Admiral)	January, 2016 -
Inspector General of Police of the Ghana Police Service	James Oppong-Boanuh	March 5, 2017 -
Board Chairman of Ghana Infrastructural Investment Fund	Christopher Ameyaw Akumfi (Prof.)	March 10, 2017 -
Board Chairman of Millennium Development Authority	Yaa Ntiamoah Badu (Prof.)	March 13, 2017 -
Board Chairman of Ghana Cocoa Board	Hackman Owusu-Agyeman	March 28, 2017 -
Board Chairman of National Hajj Secretariat	Ibrahim Cudjoe Quaye	February 11, 2017 -
Government representative on Board of National Media Commission	Kenneth Agyei Kuranchie	(nominated)
Governor of the Bank of Ghana	Ernest Kwamina Yedu Addison	April 3, 2017 -
Board Chairman of Ghana National Petroleum Corporation	Frederick Worsemao Armah Blay	May 11, 2017-
Board member of Ghana National Petroleum Corporation	Kofi Koduah Sarpong	May 11, 2017-
Director of communications of Ghana Gas Company Limited	Ernest Owusu-Bempah	(nominated)
Chief Justice of Ghana	Sophia Akuffo	(nominated)
Chairman of Ghana Oil Company Board of Directors	Kwamena Bartels	(appointed)
Board member of Ghana Oil Company	Patrick Akpe Kwame Akorli	(appointed)
Board Chairman of National Information Technology Agency	Mohammed-Sani Abdulai	August, 2017-

== See also ==
- Presidency of Nana Akufo-Addo
- Nana Akufo-Addo administration controversies

== Notes ==
1.^Note 1Cabinet does not include deputy ministers. Article 76(1) of the 1992 Constitution states that, "There shall be a cabinet which shall consist of the President, the Vice President and not less than ten and not more than nineteen Ministers of State".
2.^Note 2 Sarah Adwoa Safo doubles as Deputy Majority Leader.
3.^Note 3 A former Chief of Defense Staff of the Ghana Armed Forces.
4.^Note 4 A former Inspector General of Police.
5.^Note 5 Ex-officio member as per President of National House of Chiefs.

Preceded by Mahama government (2012—2017)	Government of Ghana; 2017–Present	Succeeded by Mahama government (2025 to date)
