= List of ambassadors and high commissioners of Ghana =

This is a list of ambassadors and high commissioners of Ghana to individual sovereign nations of the world, states with limited recognition, and to international organizations. High Commissioners represent diplomatic missions in member states of the Commonwealth of Nations and Ambassadors represent diplomatic missions in other states. The head of a diplomatic mission to an international organization is called a Permanent Representative.

Where a diplomat is accredited to more than one nation, the first country listed is the location of the Ambassador's or High Commissioner's residence, followed by other countries of accreditation, in alphabetical order.

== Current Ambassadors and High Commissioners ==
Host country	Ambassador/ High Commissioner	Title	Took office	List
Algeria	Ambassador	Nana Kwesi Arhin	September 2017	
Angola	Ambassador	Mavis Esi Kusorgbor	July 2022	
Austria	Ambassador	Philbert Isaac Kobina Abaka Johnson	December 2020	
Australia^{1}; / New Zealand; / Fiji; / Papua New Guinea; / Solomon Islands; / Samoa; / Kiribati; / Vanuatu; / Tonga	High commissioner	Edwin Nii Adjei	13 September 2017	
Belgium^{2}; / Luxembourg	Ambassador	Harriet Sena Siaw-Boateng	February 2019	
Benin	Ambassador	Alowe Leo Kabah	August 2017	
Brazil^{3}; / Argentina; / Bolivia; / Chile; / Colombia; / Ecuador; / Guyana; / Paraguay; / Peru; / Suriname; / Uruguay; / Venezuela	Ambassador	Abena Busia	August 2017	
Burkina Faso	Ambassador	Naa Bolinaa Saaka	July 2017	
Canada	High commissioner	Anselm Ransford Sowah	March 2021	
China^{4}; / North Korea	Ambassador	Edward Boateng	June 2017	
Congo-Brazzaville	Ambassador	Attah Boafo		
Cuba	Ambassador	Napoleon Abdulai	July 2017	
Czechia^{5}; / Hungary; / North Macedonia; / Romania; / Slovakia	Ambassador	Virginia Hesse	August 2017	
Denmark	Ambassador	Amerley Ollennu Awua-Asamoa	July 2017	
Democratic Republic of Congo	Ambassador			
Egypt^{6}; / Cyprus	Ambassador	Paul Okoh	July 2017	
Equatorial Guinea	Ambassador	Esther Dzifa Ofori	July 2017	
Ethiopia	Ambassador	Amma Adomaa Twum-Amoah	March 2018	
France	Ambassador	Anna Bossman	June 2017	
Germany	Ambassador	Gina Blay	June 2017	
Guinea	Ambassador	Jane Gasu-Aheto	June 2018	
Holy See	Ambassador	Joseph Kojo Akudibilah	July 2017	
India	High commissioner	Kwaku Asomah-Cheremeh	January 2023	
Iran	Ambassador	Sayuti Yahaya Iddi		
Iran	Ambassador	Eric Owusu-Boateng	December 2020	
Israel	Ambassador	Hannah Ama Nyarko	March 2018	
Italy	Ambassador	Eudora Quartey-Koranteng	March 2019	
Ivory Coast	Ambassador	Frederick Daniel Laryea	June 2017	
Japan	Ambassador	Genevieve Edna Apaloo	January 2022	
Kenya	High commissioner	Damptey Bediako Asare	September 2021	
Liberia	Ambassador	Kwabena Okubi-Appiah	June 2021	
Libya	Ambassador	Samuel Adotey Anum	January 2020	
Malaysia; / Indonesia; / Philippines; / Thailand; / Timor-Leste	High commissioner	Akua Sakyiwaa Ahenkorah	January 2018	
Mali	Ambassador	Francis Amanfoh	July 2017	
Malta	High commissioner	Mercy Bampo Addo	July 2017	
Morocco	Ambassador	Stephen Mahamudu Yakubu	June 2017	
Namibia	High commissioner	Yakubu Alhassan	August 2021	
Netherlands	Ambassador	Sophia Horner-Sam	July 2017	
Niger	Ambassador	Jonathan Rexford Magnussen	January 2020	
Nigeria	High commissioner	Baba Sadiq Abdulai Abu	August 2026	
Norway	Ambassador	Jennifer Lartey	February 2019	
Russia	Ambassador	Lesley Akyaa Opoku Ware	September 2017	
Saudi Arabia^{7}; / Bahrain; / Jordan; / Kuwait; / Oman; / Qatar; / Syria; / United Arab Emirates; / Yemen	Ambassador	Sheikh T. B. Damba	July 2017	
Senegal	Ambassador	Mrs Gloria Opoku	June 2018	
Sierra Leone	High commissioner	Francis Abakah		
South Africa^{8}; / Lesotho; / Eswatini; / Mauritius; / Madagascar; / Seychelles	High commissioner	George Ayisi-Boateng	July 2017	
South Korea	Ambassador	Dufie Agyarko Kusi	August 2017	
Spain	Ambassador	Elizabeth Adjei		
Spain	Ambassador	Muhammad Adam	December 2020	
Switzerland	Ambassador	Ramses Joseph Cleland	September 2017	
Togo	Ambassador	Kwasi Owusu-Yeboa	July 2017	
Turkey	Ambassador	Francisca Ashietey-Odunton	July 2017	
United Arab Emirates	Ambassador	Ahmed Ramadan	October 2017	
United Kingdom^{9}; / Ireland	High commissioner	Zita Sabah Benson	September 2025	
United States	Ambassador	Alima Mahama	June 2021	
Zambia	High commissioner	Margaret Ekua Prah	July 2017	
Zimbabwe^{10}; / Comoros; / Mozambique	High commissioner	Eric Odoi-Anim	March 2018	
Zimbabwe^{10}; / Comoros; / Mozambique	High commissioner	Alexander Grant Ntrakwa	December 2020	

== Permanent representatives to international organizations ==
Multilateral Organisations	Permanent Representative	Took office	List
European Union	Harriet Sena Siaw-Boateng	February 2019	
United Nations	Martha Ama Akyaa Pobee	July 2015	

== Ambassadors-at-Large ==
Other	Ambassador	Took office	List
Ambassador-at-Large	Edward Mahama	July 2017	
Ambassador-at-Large	Rasheed Seidu Inusa	July 2017	

== See also ==
- List of diplomatic missions of Ghana
- List of diplomatic missions in Ghana
- Foreign relations of Ghana

== Notes ==
- ^Note 1: The High Commission of Ghana to Australia is also accredited to New Zealand, Fiji, Papua New Guinea, Solomon Islands, Samoa, Kiribati, Nauru, Vanuatu and Tonga.
- ^Note 2: The Ghana Embassy in Belgium serves as the Embassy to Luxembourg as well as the European Union
- ^Note 3:The Ambassador Extraordinary and Plenipotentiary of Ghana to the Republic of Brazil has concurrent accreditation to Argentina, Bolivia, Chile, Colombia, Ecuador, French Guiana, Guyana, Paraguay, Peru, Suriname, Uruguay and Venezuela.
- ^Note 4:The Embassy of the Republic of Ghana in China is also accredited to the Democratic Republic of the Congo.
- ^Note 5:The Ghana Embassy in the Czech Republic has concurrent accreditation to the Slovakia, Hungary, Romania and North Macedonia.
- ^Note 6:The Ghana Embassy in Egypt is accredited to Cyprus.
- ^Note 7:The Ghana Embassy in Saudi Arabia is also covers United Arab Emirates, Bahrain, Qatar, Oman, Kuwait, Jordan, Yemen, and Syria.
- ^Note 8:The Ghana High Commission in South Africa also covers Lesotho, Eswatini, Mauritius, Madagascar and Comoros and Seychelles.
- ^Note 9:The Ghana High Commission in the United Kingdom of Great Britain and Ireland provides consular services for Ireland.
- ^Note 10:The Ghanaian High Commission in Zimbabwe provides consular services for Comoros and Mozambique.
