= Presidency of Nana Akufo-Addo =

Ghanaian presidential administration from 2017 to 2025

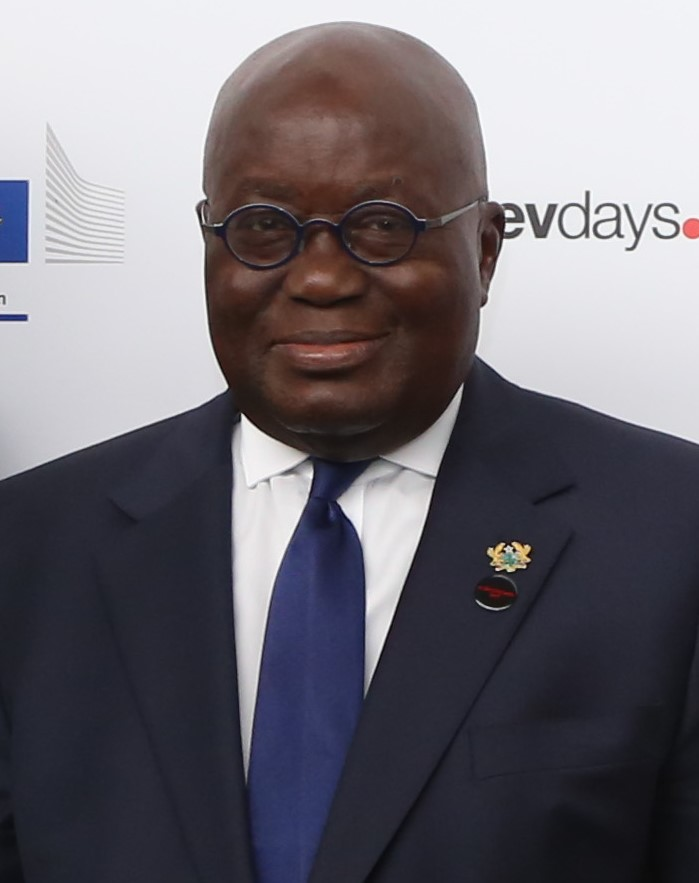
- Akufo-Addo in 2017
- Presidency of Nana Akufo-Addo; 7 January 2017 – 7 January 2025
- President: Nana Akufo-Addo
- Cabinet: See list
- Party: New Patriotic Party
- Election: 2016; 2020
- Seat: Jubilee House
- Seal of the President

The presidency of Nana Akufo-Addo began on 7 January 2017 and ended on 7 January 2025. Following the 2016 Ghanaian general elections, Nana Akufo-Addo the flag-bearer of the New Patriotic Party, succeeded John Mahama as the 13th president of Ghana and the fifth of the Fourth Republic after winning by a landslide. He won a second term on 9 December 2020 in a tightly contested race against National Democratic Congress (NDC) candidate and former president, John Mahama.

He focused his campaign on the economy, promising to stabilise the country's foreign exchange rate and to reduce unemployment levels. Akufo-Addo faced a banking crisis during his first term. The major policies in his first term were the Free SHS policy, which made access to Senior High school in Ghana free, and the One district, one factory policy. In 2017, he declared an environmental war on illegal artisanal mining in Ghana. Akufo-Addo's government provided several responses to the COVID-19 pandemic and its impact on Ghana's economy. His foreign policy entailed strengthening ties between Ghana and the African diaspora. This included fostering relations with nations of the Caribbean. Akufo-Addo also ratified the African Continental Free Trade Area and supported intra-African trade.

== 2016 general election ==
Nana Addo ran twice in the presidential elections as the New Patriotic Party (NPP) candidate when he was defeated by National Democratic Congress' candidates John Evans Atta Mills in 2008 and John Dramani Mahama in 2012 . Akufo-Addo won the presidential election in 2016 as the NPP candidate by defeating John Dramani Mahama marking the first time in Ghanaian history that an opposition candidate won a majority outright in the first round.

== Inauguration ==
Akufo-Addo took office on 7 January 2017. His inauguration was held at Black Star Square in Accra. Twelve presidents from African and European countries attended the ceremony, including Edgar Lungu of Zambia, Abdel Fattah el-Sisi of Egypt, Ernest Bai Koroma of Sierra Leone, Robert Mugabe of Zimbabwe, Muhammadu Buhari of Nigeria. During his inauguration, Akufo-Addo made several promises which included the following:

- Protecting the public purse by giving attention to value for money in all transactions.
- Promising to make Ghana attractive for business once again.
- Pledging to cooperate and promote peace on the African continent as well as political stability and democracy.

== Personnel ==
=== Ministers ===
Current Government
Office(s)	Officeholder	Term
President	Nana Addo Dankwa Akuffo-Addo	7 January 2017 –
Vice President	Mahamudu Bawumia	7 January 2017 –
Sector Ministers^{Note 1}
Office(s)	Officeholder	Term
Ministry of Trade and Industry	Alan John Kyerematen; Carlos Kingsley Ahenkorah (MP) (deputy minister); Robert Ahomka-Lindsey (deputy minister)	27 January 2017 – (nominated) (nominated)
Ministry of Finance	Ken Ofori-Atta; Kwaku Kwarteng (Deputy minister); Abena Osei Asare (MP) (Deputy minister); Charles Adu Boahen (Deputy minister)	27 January 2017 – (nominated) (nominated) (nominated)
Ministry of Defence	Dominic Nitiwul; Derrick Oduro (Maj.) (Deputy minister)	27 January 2017 – (nominated)
Ministry of The Interior	Ambrose Dery; Henry Quartey (deputy minister)	27 January 2017 – (nominated)
Ministry of Energy and Petroleum	John Peter Amewu Boakye Agyarko Owuraku Aidoo (deputy minister); Joseph Cudjoe (deputy minister); Mohammed Amin Adam (deputy minister)	August 2018- 27 January 2017 –August 2018 (nominated) (nominated) (nominated)
Office of Attorney General and Ministry of Justice	Gloria Akuffo; Godfred Dame (deputy minister); Joseph Dindiok Kpemka (Deputy minister)	27 January 2017 – (nominated) (nominated)
Ministry of Foreign Affairs	Shirley Ayorkor Botwe (MP); Mohammed Habbib Tijani (Deputy minister); Charles Owiredu (Deputy minister)	29 January 2017 - (nominated) (nominated)
Ministry of Food and Agriculture	Owusu Afriyie Akoto; William Agyapong Quaitoo (Deputy minister); Sagre Bambangi (Deputy minister); George Oduro (Deputy minister)	27 January 2017 – (nominated) - 29 August 2017 (nominated) (nominated)
Ministry of Education	Matthew Opoku-Prempeh Yaw Osei Adutwum (Deputy minister)	27 January 2017 – (nominated) (nominated)
Ministry of Health	Kwaku Agyemang-Manu; Dr Bernard Oko-Boye(MP) (Deputy minister); Tina Gifty Naa Ayele Mensah (Deputy minister)	27 January 2017 – (nominated) (nominated)
Ministry Monitoring and Evaluation (Ghana)	Anthony Akoto Osei; William Kwasi Sabi (Deputy minister)	7 February 2017 – (nominated)
Ministry of Regional Reorganization and Development (Ghana)	Dan Kweku Botwe (MP); Martin Agyei-Mensah Korsah (Deputy minister)	7 February 2017 – (nominated)
Ministry of Lands and Natural Resources	Kwaku Asomah-Cheremeh John Peter Amewu Benito Owusu Bio (Deputy minister); Barbara Oteng Gyasi (Deputy minister)	August 2018- 7 February 2017 –August 2018 (nominated) (nominated)
Ministry of Sanitation and Water Resources (Ghana)	Cecilia Abena Dapaah (MP); Patrick Boamah (Deputy minister); Michael Yaw Gyato (Deputy minister)	August 2018 – (nominated) (nominated)
Ministry of Railway Development (Ghana)	Joe Ghartey; Kwaku Agyenim Boateng (Deputy minister); Andy Appiah-Kubi (Deputy minister)	7 February 2017 – (nominated) (nominated)
Ministry of Employment and Labour Relations	Ignatius Bafuor Awuah (MP); Bright Wireko Brobbey (Deputy minister)	7 February 2017 – (nominated)
Ministry of Transport	Kweku Ofori Asiamah; Nii Kwartei Titus Glover (Deputy minister)	7 February 2017 – (nominated)
Ministry of Tourism, Culture and Creative Arts (Ghana)	Catherine Ablema Afeku (MP); Ziblim Barri Iddi (Deputy minister)	10 February 2017 – (nominated)
Ministry of Special Development Initiative (Ghana)	Mavis Hawa Koomson (MP)	10 February 2017 –
Senior Minister (Ghana)	Yaw Osafo-Maafo	27 January 2017 –
Ministry of Environment, Science and Technology	Kwabena Frimpong-Boateng; Patricia Appiagyei (Deputy minister)	7 February 2017 – (nominated)
National Security Ministry (Ghana)	Albert Kan-Dapaah	27 January 2017 –
Ministry of Youth and Sports	Isaac Kwame Asiamah (MP); Pius Enam Hadzide (Deputy minister)	10 February 2017 – (nominated)
Ministry of Local Government and Rural Development (Ghana)	Alima Mahama; Osei Bonsu Amoah (Deputy minister); Collins Ntim (Deputy minister); Kwasi Boateng Agyei (Deputy minister)	27 January 2017 – (nominated) (nominated) (nominated)
Ministry of Works and Housing (Ghana)	Samuel Atta Akyea (MP); Freda Prempeh (Deputy minister); Eugene Antwi (Deputy minister) Ms Barbara Asher Ayisi(Deputy minister)	7 February 2017 – (nominated) (nominated)
Ministry of Communication	Ursula Owusu Ekuful (MP); George Andah (Deputy minister); Vincent Sowah Odotei (Deputy minister)	7 February 2017 – (nominated) (nominated)
Ministry of Information	Kojo Oppong Nkrumah Mustapha Abdul-Hamid Ama Dokuaa Asiamah Agyei (Deputy minister); Perry Curtis Kwabla Okudzeto (Deputy minister)	August 2018- 10 February 2017 –August 2018 (nominated) (nominated)
Ministry of Roads and Highways	Kwesi Amoako Atta; Kwabena Owusu Aduomi (MP) (Deputy minister); Anthony N-Yoh Puowele Karbo (MP) (Deputy minister)	7 February 2017 – (nominated) (nominated)
Ministry of Gender, Children and Social Protection	Cynthia Morrison Otiko Afisa Djaba Gifty Twum Ampofo (Deputy minister)	November 2018- 7 February 2017 –August 2018 (nominated)
Ministry of Planning	George Yaw Gyan-Baffour (Prof.) (MP)	10 February 2017 –
Ministry of Fisheries And Aquaculture	Elizabeth Afoley Quaye (MP); Francis Kingsley Ato Cudjoe (Deputy minister)	10 February 2017 – (nominated)
Ministry for Chieftaincy and Religious Affairs (Ghana)	Kofi Dzamesi; Paul Essien (Deputy minister)	10 February 2017 – (nominated)
Ministry of Inner cities and Zongo Development (Ghana)	Abubakar Boniface Siddique (MP) Mustapha Abdul-Hamid	10 February 2017 –August 2018 August 2018-
Ministry of Business Development	Ibrahim Mohammed Awal	10 February 2017 –
Minister for Parliamentary Affairs (Ghana)	Osei Kyei Mensah Bonsu (MP)	10 February 2017 –
Ministry of Aviation	Joseph Kofi Koddi Adda; Kwabena O. Darko-Mensah (Deputy minister)	August 2018– (nominated)
Ministers of State
Office(s)	Officeholder	Term
Minister of State at the Office of the President in charge of Public Procurement	Sarah Adwoa Safo^{Note 2}	4 April 2017 –
Minister of State at the Ministry of Education in charge of Tertiary Education	Kwesi Yankah (Prof.)	4 April 2017 –
Minister of State at the Ministry of Agriculture	Nurah Gyeile	4 April 2017 –
Minister of State at the Office of the President	Bryan Acheampong (MP)	4 April 2017 –
Regional Ministers
Region	Officeholder	Term
Ashanti Regional Minister	Simon Osei-Mensah; Elizabeth Agyeman (Deputy minister)	19 February 2017 – (nominated)
Brong Ahafo Region	Kweku Asomah-Cheremeh; Evans Opoku (Deputy minister)	19 February 2017 – (nominated)
Central Region	Kwamena Duncan; Thomas Agyei Baffour (Deputy minister)	19 February 2017 – (nominated)
Eastern Region	Kwakye Darfour; Joseph Tetteh (MP) (Nkansah Sampson)	19 February 2017 – (nominated)
Greater Accra Regional Minister	Ishmael Ashitey; Elizabeth Kwatsoo Tetteh Sackey (Deputy minister)	19 February 2017 – (nominated)
Northern Region	Salifu Saeed; Solomon Namliit Boar (MP) (Deputy minister)	19 February 2017 – (nominated)
Upper East Region	Alhassan Samari; Frank Fuseini Adongo (MP) (Deputy minister)	19 February 2017 – (nominated)
Upper West Region	Sulemana Alhassan; Amidu Ishaq (Deputy minister)	19 February 2017 – (nominated)
Volta Regional Minister	Archibald Letsa; Maxwell Blagogee (Deputy minister)	19 February 2017 – (nominated)
Western Region	Kwaku Afriyie; Eugenia Gifty Kusi (Deputy minister)	19 February 2017 – (nominated)

=== Parliamentary appointments ===
Office(s)	Officeholder	Term
Speaker of Parliament	Aaron Mike Oquaye	7 January 2017 – 6 January 2021
Speaker of Parliament	Alban Bagbin	7 January 2021 -
First Deputy Speaker of Parliament	Joseph Osei Owusu (MP)	7 January 2017 – 6 January 2024
Majority Leader	Osei Kyei Mensah Bonsu (MP)	7 January 2017 – 21 February 2024
Deputy Majority Leader	Sarah Adwoa Safo (MP)	7 January 2017 -
Majority Chief Whip	Kwasi Ameyaw-Cheremeh (MP)	7 January 2017 -

== Domestic affairs ==
=== Education ===
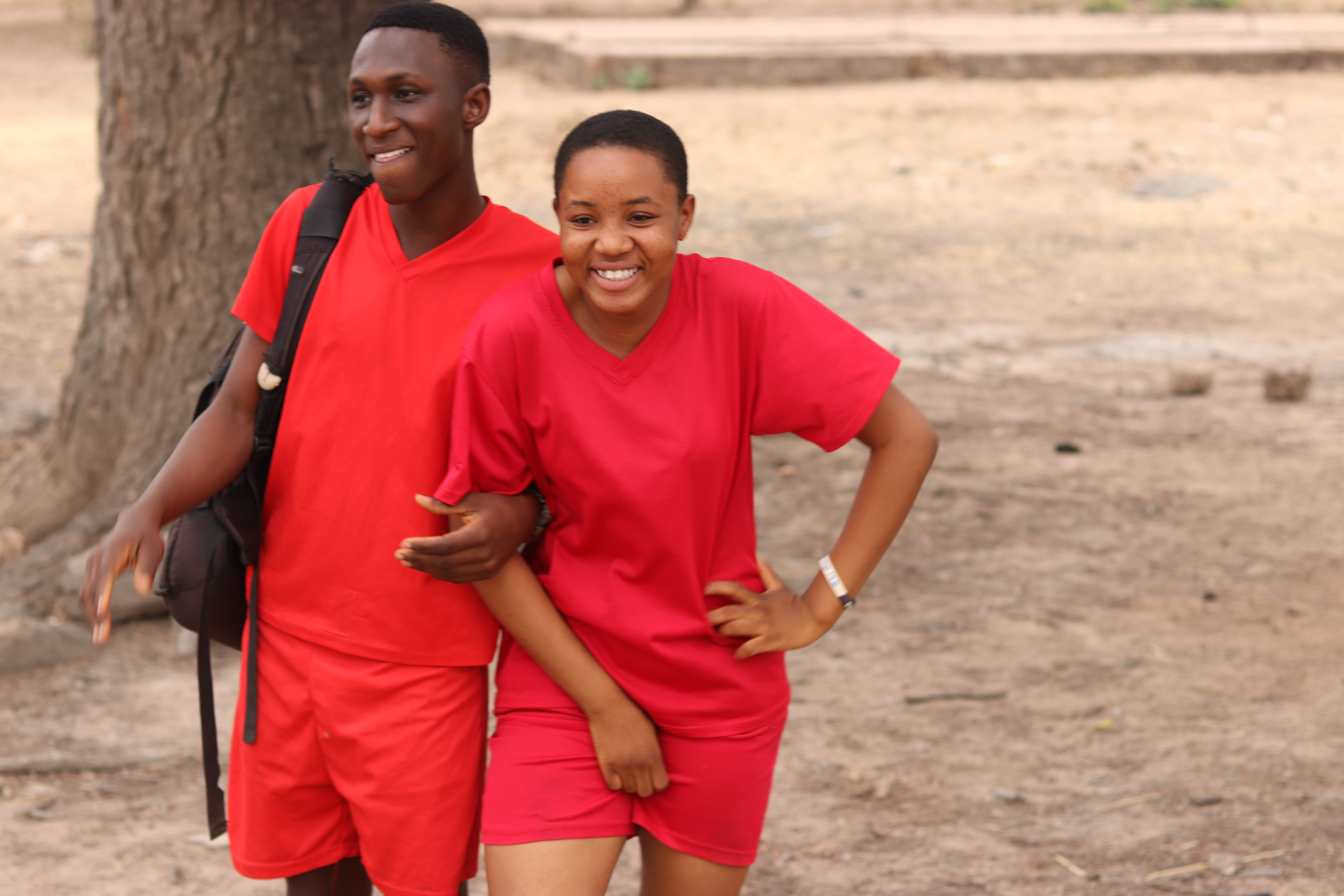
Senior high school students in Ghana

The Free Secondary High School (Free SHS) education policy was introduced in the 2017 September. The policy was a part of the president's presidential campaign during the Ghana's 2016 election period, and has become an essential part of Ghana's educational system.

==== Economic impact ====
===== Increase in enrolments since the implementation of the double track system =====
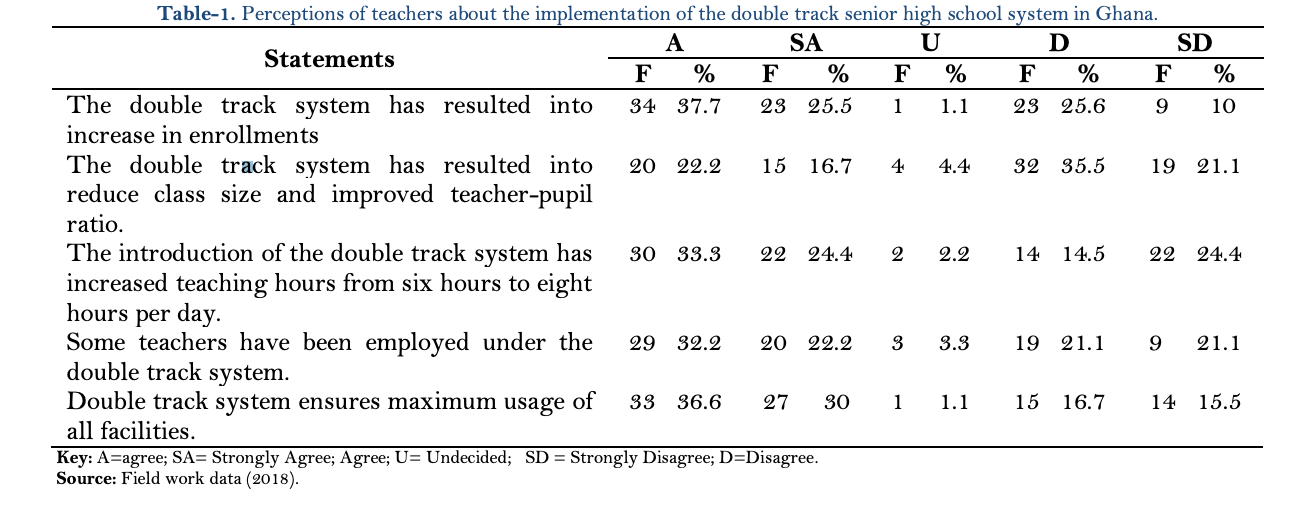

The anticipation for high school students to join career fields in the public sector that necessitate tertiary education, could now be further encouraged. A gap reduction has formed in university graduates who acquire degrees without the achievement of secondary studies. Previously, 70% of high school students that desired government employee positions by the age of 25 was realistically achieved by only 6% of that percentage. Through the policy, the labour market has expanded in diverse fields with more educated individuals to progress the nation's development. Studies highlighted that students with higher economic capital in comparison to their economically disadvantaged peers are given an abundance of educational opportunities. Promoting free high school education became an argument that it would fuel Ghana's economic growth. The Free SHS policy widens the eligibility and success rate of these educational opportunities with an aim for the individual to develop into a societal asset.

==== Political Impact ====
The policy prioritises student welfare. Thus, it encourages young people to be more politically conscious and engaged with political affairs. It has built voter's confidence for a lot of senior high school students and their families where support for political parties are now reliant on recognised party results and not on party philosophies. The non-discriminatory nature of the Free SHS policy has improved political awareness and functionality within Ghana, through its ability to be both a political promise to society and eventually become a successful product of it. It has encouraged citizen understanding and trustworthiness of taxation in the belief that the tax will directly contribute to financing the policy. The Free SHS policy is a testament to modern day democratic politics where an initial intention results in an effective political impact, and where policy and laws are executed in favour of the development of citizens and their society.

==== Social Impact ====
The policy lifted the financial burden for most parents, who can now be more supportive in their child's academia without feeling dependent on scholarships or private benefits. In aim to afford long term educational costs, lower income households commonly neglect the short term educational costs. Hence tuition payment for parents and guardians was essential obligation and the purchasing of school equipment became secondary needs. The Free SHS policy covers the primary and secondary expenditure that caregivers were burdened to provide despite their economic incapability to do so. Initially most parents would pay for secondary school tuition based on their own ability to understand their child's competency, but are now relieved of the social hindrance of choosing some children over others to be educated.

=== Economy ===
In 2019, under the administration of the Akufo-Addo government, Ghana became the fastest growing economy in the world. Also, Ghana's GDP by 2019 was the 9th largest in Africa. In 2018, the president introduced the 7-year Co-ordinated Programme of Economic and Social Development Policies which is expected to create jobs for the country. According to the president, the policies are founded on "five pillars of growth and development, namely revitalizing the economy; transform agriculture and industry; revamping economic and social infrastructure; strengthening social protection and inclusion; and reforming delivery system of public services institutions."

==== One district, one factory ====
The one district, one factory was a policy aimed at providing jobs through industrialization. The policy was part of the government manifesto to provide an industry and factory within every district in Ghana.

From June to July 2020, the government stated that, across the country 76 factories were in operation. Due to the policy, 28 factories are newly built factories whiles 48 are existing factories under the implementation of expansion and revival.

==== Ekumfi Fruits & Juices Limited ====
The industry specializes in the manufacturing of locally made fruit juices from the Ekumfi Abor district in the Central Region of Ghana. It forms part of the One District, One Factory (1D1F) initiative.

The factory has created about 5000 direct jobs in an attempt to alleviate poverty within the community and its neighboring districts and regions. The facility is known to be the biggest processing factory for fruits in West Africa, producing approximately 10 tons of fruits per hour.

=== Health and infrastructure ===
On January 28, 2020, the president delivered 307 ambulances for the 275 constituencies in Ghana, with one ambulance per constituency. This stems from the presidential campaign promise during the 2016 general elections of the initiative one constituency one ambulance.

In 2020, the government partnered with the private sector to build the Ghana Infectious Disease Centre which is Ghana's first infectious disease centre. In January 2020, the country adopted the 112 general emergency number to merge all emergency numbers. The president commenced the construction of the Pokuase Interchange in partnership with the African Development Bank. The interchange is Africa's second four level stack interchange and the first in West Africa. The project was initiated as a 3-tier interchange during the Mahama administration but was changed to a 4-tier by the Akufo-Addo government.

The implementation of a paperless port system at Ghana's major ports occurred in September 2017. This new system reduced the time required for clearing goods during shipping from a period of one week to four hours. The Ghana Revenue Authority reported in 2019 that import revenue increased by 3.9% as a result. On 1 June 2020, the paperless system, initially managed by GCNET, was replaced by a new software in the form of the Integrated Customs Management System (ICUMS). The ICUMS serves as a window through which all documents and payments are processed. The introduction of the new system was met with rejection from some stakeholders such as the Ghana Institute of Freight Forwarders who questioned its efficacy. The government justified their decision to execute the use of the new management system after statistical data from the GRA in December 2020 revealed that the ICUMS generated GH¢10.5 billion between June and December, 2020, which was higher on a year-on-year comparison with the previous paperless software program in terms of revenue generation.

=== Environment ===
Operation Vanguard is a Military Police Joint Task Force (JTF) set up by the president in 2017 to combat the operation of galamsey in Ghana. Galamseyers are illegal miners and have over the years depleted Ghana's forest cover and water bodies due to the crude and unregulated nature of the mining process.

Three Forward Operating Bases were established in the Ashanti, Eastern and Western Regions. The JTF is made up of service men and women from the Ghana Armed Forces and the Ghana Police Service. At the start of the operation, the government placed a six-month ban on all forms of small scale mining in the country. The operation was extended from January 2018 to June 2018 because its intended objectives had not yet been achieved.

==== Success ====
In February 2018, over 1,000 illegal miners had been arrested and their equipment seized. Several hundred makeshift accommodations had been destroyed. Successful operations had stopped the pollution of bodies of water, especially at Dokokyina near the Bui Dam, as well as the rivers of Birim, Ankobra, and Offin.

=== COVID-19 pandemic ===
On 11 March 2020, President Nana Akufo-Addo directed the minister of finance, Ken Ofori-Atta, to make the cedi equivalent of $US100 million available in order to enhance Ghana's coronavirus preparedness and response plan for the COVID-19 pandemic. The president disclosed that the government, through the MoE, planned a relief package for private schools who were affected by COVID-19 induced shutdown of schools.

A tax waiver of GHS174 million cedis (equivalent to US$30 million) on income taxes of frontline workers was granted for three months from July to September 2020 and by November 2020, it was extended till the end of the year. Under Akufo Addo's administration, government provided cooked and uncooked food to the vulnerable during the 3-week lockdown. Electricity and water were provided free for the rest of 2020 and for the first three months of 2021. On 19 April 2020, the president announced the easing of the partial lockdown imposed for three weeks. Preventive protocols were still in effect. Stage one of the process of easing restrictions took effect on 5 June 2020. Religious services, funerals, and weddings were allowed with reduced capacity and length.

==== Coronavirus Alleviation Program ====
The Coronavirus Alleviation Program Business Support Scheme (CAPBuSS) was launched on 19 May 2020 by President Nana Akufo-Addo. It was formed as part of Ghana's government intention of providing support to MSMEs who were affected by the COVID-19 pandemic in Ghana. It was presented by an agency under the Ministry of Trade and Industry in Ghana called NBSSI. The president announced GH¢1 billion after it was approved by the parliament of Ghana.

According to the executive director of NBSSI, more than 21,800 jobs were created under this scheme. These jobs were mainly owned by youths in Ghana. Also, about 110,000 MSMEs in Ghana were said to be owned by women who have benefited from the funds set by the government.

==== Ghana CARES ====
On 18 November 2020 the Ghana CARES program was launched by Nana Akufo-Addo. The initiative serves as a 'blueprint' for the recovery of Ghana's economy post COVID-19.

=== Other initiatives ===
Under the regime of Akufo-Addo, the government sponsored the Ghana Post GPS, which is the first digital addressing system created in the country. The system provides a digital address as well as postal codes for every 5 squared meter location in Ghana. In May 2020, Ghana launched the world's first digital financial services policy. Also, the Office of the Special Prosecutor was established in 2017 to make inquiries into crimes at the national level. Planting for Food and Jobs was a program initiated in 2017 on the premise that foods such as maize, rice and sorghum are insufficiently produced in Ghana, leading to losses in potential GDP growth in the country. The program took inspiration from Operation Feed Yourself; an agricultural policy by Ghana's 6th Head of state, Ignatius Kutu Acheampong.

The 2018 Ghanaian new regions referendum led to an increase in Ghana's regions from ten to sixteen under the president's administration. The new regions are Oti, Western North, North East, Ahafo (splitting from Brong), Savannah and Bono East Regions. The creations of the regions end decades of petitions to the government calling for the development of new regions. The Minerals Income Investment Fund was implemented in 2019 to manage and invest in Ghana's mining royalties.

== Foreign affairs ==
In 2017, president Akufo-Addo approved of Ghana's participation in the ECOWAS military intervention in the Gambia. He supported the inauguration of the then president-elect, Adama Barrow.

On 29 December 2019, the president expressed his desire to adopt the new eco currency as West Africa's single currency.

The year of return was formally launched in September 2018 during his visit in Washington, D.C. as a program for Africans in the diaspora to unite with Africans. The year of return boosted tourism in Ghana with visits from famous celebrities such as Kofi Kingston, Steve Harvey and Michael Jai White. The Beyond the Return initiative succeed the year of return as a program to foster economic relations and investments between the African diaspora and Ghana as well as Africa.

On 18 August 2020, the president commissioned and handed over the headquarters of the ACFTA Secretariat to the AU in Accra. President Akufo-Addo had earlier signed the ACFTA, Kigali declaration and Protocol on Free Movement of People on 21 March 2018, at the 2018 Kigali Summit.

=== Foreign relations with Barbados ===
As part of a visit by the prime minister of Barbados, Mia Mottley to Ghana in November 2019, Ghana and Barbados signed two agreements at the Jubilee House on 15 November 2015. The memorandum of understanding involved the recruitment of Ghanaian nurses to Barbados and a sister port agreement between Port of Tema and Bridgetown Port.

=== Foreign relations with Jamaica ===
President Akufo-Addo held bilateral discussions with Prime Minister of Jamaica, Andrew Holness, in Kingston where they agreed to reciprocal visa free travel between Ghana and Jamaica in order to improve trade between both countries.

=== Foreign relations with Mexico ===
In August 2019, Mexican Foreign Undersecretary Julián Ventura Valero paid a visit to Ghana and met with Foreign Deputy Minister Charles Owiredu. Both nations agreed to establish a Consultation Mechanism on Common Interests. Ghana also declared its intention to re-open an embassy in Mexico City.

=== Foreign relations with the United States ===
In 2018, the Government of Ghana initiated a Status of Forces agreement with the United States Department of Defense. Several Ghanaian intellectuals such as former president Jerry Rawlings and MP Samuel Okudzeto Ablakwa, opposed the military agreement with concerns that it will obstruct and influence Ghanaian self sovereignty. In April 2018, the president denounced these claims and asserted that the agreement did not include the construction of a future United States military base in Ghana.

=== Multilateral relations ===
Akuffo-Addo, who was chairman of ECOWAS, oversaw a diplomatic meeting between the bloc and Mali on 9 January 2022 at Accra, following the forced overthrowal of president Bah Ndaw. Mali was suspended from the union over delayal to uphold elections after the 2020 Malian coup d'état. Guinea was also suspended from the bloc after it fell to a coup within the same year. Sanctions were placed on both countries on 16 September 2021. Akufo-Addo, led an ECOWAS delegation to Conakry to meet with junta leaders on 17 September 2021. On 28 January 2022, ECOWAS announced the suspension of Burkina Faso's membership as a result of the 2022 Burkina Faso coup d'état.

During the Eleventh emergency special session of the United Nations General Assembly, Ghana was among the 11 countries on the Security Council who voted in favor of the United Nations Security Council Resolution 2623, amid the Russian invasion of Ukraine in 2022. Foreign Minister Shirley Ayorkor Botchway had earlier condemned the invasion on 24 February 2022. Evacuation of Ghanaians stranded in Ukraine amid the Russian invasion commenced within March. The first batch of 17 students arrived on 1 March 2022.

== Controversies ==
=== Plagiarism of inauguration speech ===
Nana Akufo-Addo was accused of lifting parts of his inauguration speech from previous addresses given by former US presidents Bill Clinton and George W Bush. This led to a public uproar with some deeming it as an embarrassment to the country and calling for the sacking of the speechwriter or for someone to take responsibility. The director of communication at the presidency subsequently issued an apology. Some public figures also called for Ghanaians to disregard the incident. Akufo-Addo has since referred to the incident in jest at a thanksgiving service he attended.

=== Breaking of laws by vigilante groups ===
Vigilante groups loyal to the government known as the Delta Force went on rampage and forcefully ejected the nominee of Ashanti regional security coordinator nominated by the president. The vigilantee group stormed the circuit court in Kumasi and freed 13 members of their group in custody of the Police.

== Re-election ==
In February 2019, former president John Mahama was confirmed as the candidate of the opposition National Democratic Congress. In December, incumbent president Nana Akufo-Addo announced his intentions of contesting for re-election as the New Patriotic Party (NPP) candidate. He was chosen as the NPP candidate in June 2020. This was the third time Akufo-Addo and John Mahama contested against each other in a Ghanaian general election. Mahama and Akufo-Addo previously ran against each other in both 2012 (with Mahama winning) and 2016 (with Akufo-Addo winning). In all, 17 candidates contested for the election. As of 2020, this is the highest number of presidential candidates in a Ghanaian presidential election.

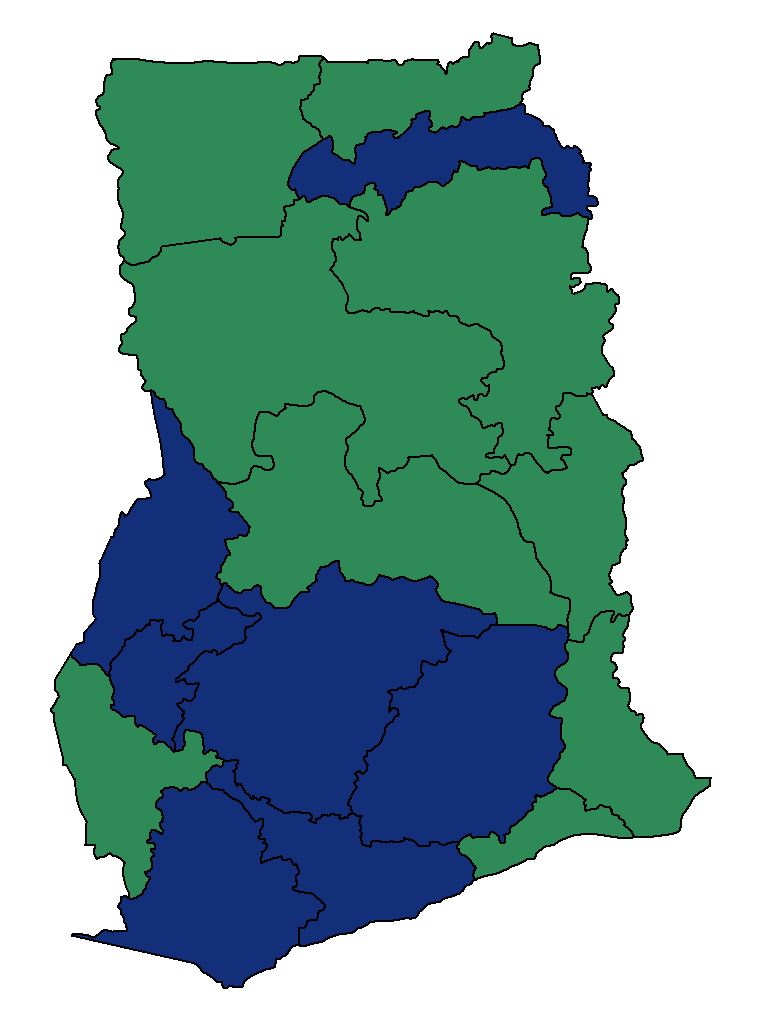
NPP in Blue and NDC in Green

Nana Akufo-Addo won the election in the first round with 51.30% of the votes against Mahama's 47.36%.

=== Coinciding parliamentary election ===
Affiliation	Members
New Patriotic Party (NPP)	137
National Democratic Congress (NDC)	136
Independent	1
Total	274 of 275
Government Majority	
Source: GhanaWeb

As many as 40 NPP MPs lost their primaries. The NDC also won many seats in parliament compared to the preceding election in 2016.

== See also ==
- Mahamudu Bawumia

== Notes ==
1.^Note 1Cabinet does not include deputy ministers. Article 76(1) of the 1992 Constitution states that, "There shall be a cabinet which shall consist of the President, the Vice President and not less than ten and not more than nineteen Ministers of State".
2.^Note 2 Sarah Adwoa Safo doubles as Deputy Majority Leader.
