= Paulina Abagaye =

Ghanaian diplomat

Hon. Paulina Patience Tangoba Abagaye

Ambassador to Italy
- In office July 2017 – August 2018

Upper East Regional Minister
- Incumbent
- Assumed office August 2018
- President: Nana Akuffo-Addo
- Succeeded by: Stephen Yakubu

Personal details
- Born: July 14, 1969 (age 57) Ghana
- Party: New Patriotic Party
- Profession: Teacher

Paulina Patience Tangoba Abagaye (born 14 July 1969) is a Ghanaian diplomat and a member of the New Patriotic Party of Ghana. She is Ghana's former ambassador to Italy appointed in 2017 under the government of Nana Addo Akuffo-Addo. She was the Upper East Regional Minister.

== Ambassadorial appointment ==
In July 2017, President Nana Akuffo-Addo named Paulina Abagaye as Ghana's ambassador to Italy. She was among twenty-two other distinguished Ghanaians who were named to head various diplomatic Ghanaian missions in the world.

== Political career ==
In December 2020, Abagaye contested and lost to the NDC's parliamentary candidate, Sampson Chiragia.

== Achievement and criticism in regional administration ==
During her tenure as upper east regional minister, from November 2018 to early 2021, Abagaye promoted national government initiative aimed at poverty reduction, including the One Village One Dam program, Free Senior High School policy, and One District One Factory scheme, emphasizing her potential to leverage local recourses for economic growth. She spearheaded efforts to construct dams across the region, announcing plans for multiple sites upon her appointment and later expressing satisfaction with the nearing completion of 32 such dams by contractors in May 2019. Abagaye also inspected ongoing development projects, affirming commitments to infrastructure like schools and water systems, and engaged traditional leaders in advancing the eastern corridor road Pwalugu.

Abagaye addressed educational challenges by convening a crisis meeting in July 2019 with heads of secondary schools to curb rampant student riots, charging students leaders to maintain transparency in operations.

Critics, including local residents, in areas like Bongo and Bolgatanga, expressed disappointment in May 2019 over the delivery of small-scale dug outs rather than large dams promised under government programs, viewing some water bodies as hazardous after they claimed six lives. In January 2021, Abagaye denied accusations from political opponents that she had leveraged central government project for personal electoral gain during her parliament bid, asserting such claims as unfounded. Abagaye herself lamented the frequent turnover of regional ministers in January 2019, arguing it hindered sustainable progress in the Upper East.
