= William Kanyirigi =

Ghanaian career diplomat

Amb. William Awinador-Kanyirige

Ambassador to Ethiopia
- In office 2017–2018
- Succeeded by: Amma Adomaa Twum-Amoah

Personal details
- Born: William Azuma Awinador-Kanyirige Ghana
- Children: 4
- Occupation: Career Diplomat

William Azumah Awinador-Kanyirige is a retired career diplomat who served with the Ghana Foreign Service from July 1987 to May 2018. He is currently a private consultant with a focus on research and capacity building in the areas of governance, strategic planning, diplomacy, peacebuilding, youth mentorship, regional integration and development.

== Early life and education ==
After graduating from the University of Ghana with a BA Combined Honours Degree in French and Spanish (1977–81), he also obtained an MA in International Affairs (Legon Centre for International Affairs) at University of Ghana (1989–90), and an MA in International Relations at Institut International de l”Administration Publique / Ecole National d’Administration (ENA), Paris (1991–92).

== Diplomatic career ==
Prior to retirement he was Ghana's Ambassador to Ethiopia July 2017 to May 2018 (with concurrent accreditation to Djibouti, South Sudan and Somalia), as well as Permanent Representative to the African Union and UN Economic Commission for Africa.

Earlier on, Ambassador Awinador-Kanyirige was the High Commissioner of Ghana to the Federal Republic of Nigeria and Permanent Representative to ECOWAS (September 2014 t6o June 2017). He also served in various Ambassadorial capacities at both the Foreign Ministry and its Diplomatic Missions abroad, namely, Harare, Paris and New York. Including, a secondment to ECOWAS Commission, Abuja, as Chief of Staff (2002-2008), and an earlier secondment as District Chief Executive in Bolgatanga, Ghana (1987–89).

He had earlier worked in the Africa Regional Office of the International Young Christian Students, IYCS, (1982–85) as a member of the Five-Member Regional Coordination Team in Nairobi, Kenya; including a Programmes and Research Officer at the National Commission on Children (1985–87) Accra, Ghana.

=== Ambassador of Ethiopia ===
In July 2017, President Nana Akuffo-Addo named William Awinador-Kanyirige as Ghana's ambassador to Ethiopia. He was among twenty two other distinguished Ghanaians who were named to head various diplomatic Ghanaian mission in the world. Prior to his appointment he has held numerous diplomatic positions both within and outside of Ghana.(Director, High commissioner, Ambassador.etc.) He was succeeded as ambassador to Ethiopia by Amma Adomaa Twum-Amoah in June 2018.

== Associations and boards ==
Mr. Awinador-Kanyirige was also a Member of the executive board of the West African Network for Peacebuilding (WANEP), from 2009 to 2014. He also served on the Bureau of the United Nations Commission on Population and Development in 2011/12 as Vice Chairman, representing Africa.

He is a fellow of the Society for Peace Studies and Practitioners (SPSP). Nigeria. He is also a Patron of the Cardinal Dery Foundation (CDF). And nominated board member for new Board of the Centre for Conflict Transformation and Peace Studies (CECOTAPS).

== Publications ==
Published Papers: “The Ghana National Peace Council.” Policy Brief, Published August 2014, The Global Center for the Responsibility to Protect (GCR2P), Ralph Bunch Institute, City University, New York. National Management of Regional Integration: The case of Ghana, ECOWAS and the African Union (Chapter 8); In Regional Integration and Development in Africa; edited by, Lourdes Benavides de la Vega. CIDOB. CATARATA, 2010.

== Personal life ==
Awinador-Kanyirige speaks Grune, Dagbani, Hausa, English, French, Spanish, and a smattering of Twi and Kiswahili. He is married to Mrs Josephine Adjoa Awinador-Kanyirige and blessed with four children, Petrina, Darkowa, Winborah and William Tinotenda.

== See also ==
- List of ambassadors and high commissioners of Ghana
