= African Union Department of Health, Humanitarian Affairs and Social Development =

Department of the African Union

Department of Health, Humanitarian Affairs and Social Development
Department overview
- Formed: February 2022
- Preceding department: Department of Social Affairs
- Jurisdiction: Africa
- Headquarters: Addis Ababa, Ethiopia
- Department executive: Amma Twum-Amoah, Commissioner
- Parent department: African Union Commission
- Website: au.int/en/hhs

The Department of Health, Humanitarian Affairs and Social Development (HHS) is a department of the African Union (AU) responsible for promoting health, humanitarian assistance, and social development across Africa. The department focuses on advancing the AU's health, labour, employment, migration, social development, drug control, crime prevention, sport, and cultural agenda.

== History ==
HHS was established in February 2022 following the restructuring of the AU's institutional framework, which saw the transition from the Department of Social Affairs to the new HHS department. The restructure aimed to streamline operations and enhance the AU's capacity to address health, humanitarian, and social challenges on the continent.

== Mandate ==
The department's mandate aligns with the AU's Agenda 2063 and focuses on implementing continental frameworks to promote health, social protection, and sustainable development. The department's core roles include:

- Supporting member states’ policies on labour, employment, population, health, and migration.
- Developing programmes and strategies for drug control and crime prevention.
- Promoting AU instruments for advancing the social and solidarity agenda.
- Implementing the Great African Museum Project under Agenda 2063.
- Leading the Cost of Hunger in Africa (COHA) study project.
- Launching the proposed African Union Sport Council (AUSC) to oversee the African Games.

== Structure ==
Commissioner for Health, Humanitarian Affairs and Social Development: H.E. Amb. Amma Twum-Amoah, Ghana (elected in February 2025).

=== Directorates ===
- Directorate of Health and Humanitarian Affairs: Professor Julio Rakotonirina, Madagascar
- Directorate of Social Development, Culture and Sport: Acting Director Angela Martins, Mozambique

== Technical offices ==
The HHS department hosts and collaborates with the following specialised offices:

- African Committee of Experts on the Rights and Welfare of the Child (ACERWC)
- African Academy of Languages (ACALAN)
- Centre for Linguistic and Historical Studies by Oral Tradition (CELHTO)
- African Institute for Remittances (AIR)
- Africa Centres for Disease Control and Prevention (Africa CDC)

== See also ==
- African Union
- Agenda 2063
- African Union Sport Council
