= Genevieve Apaloo =

Ghanaian Diplomat and Ambassador to Japan

Amb. Genevieve Apaloo
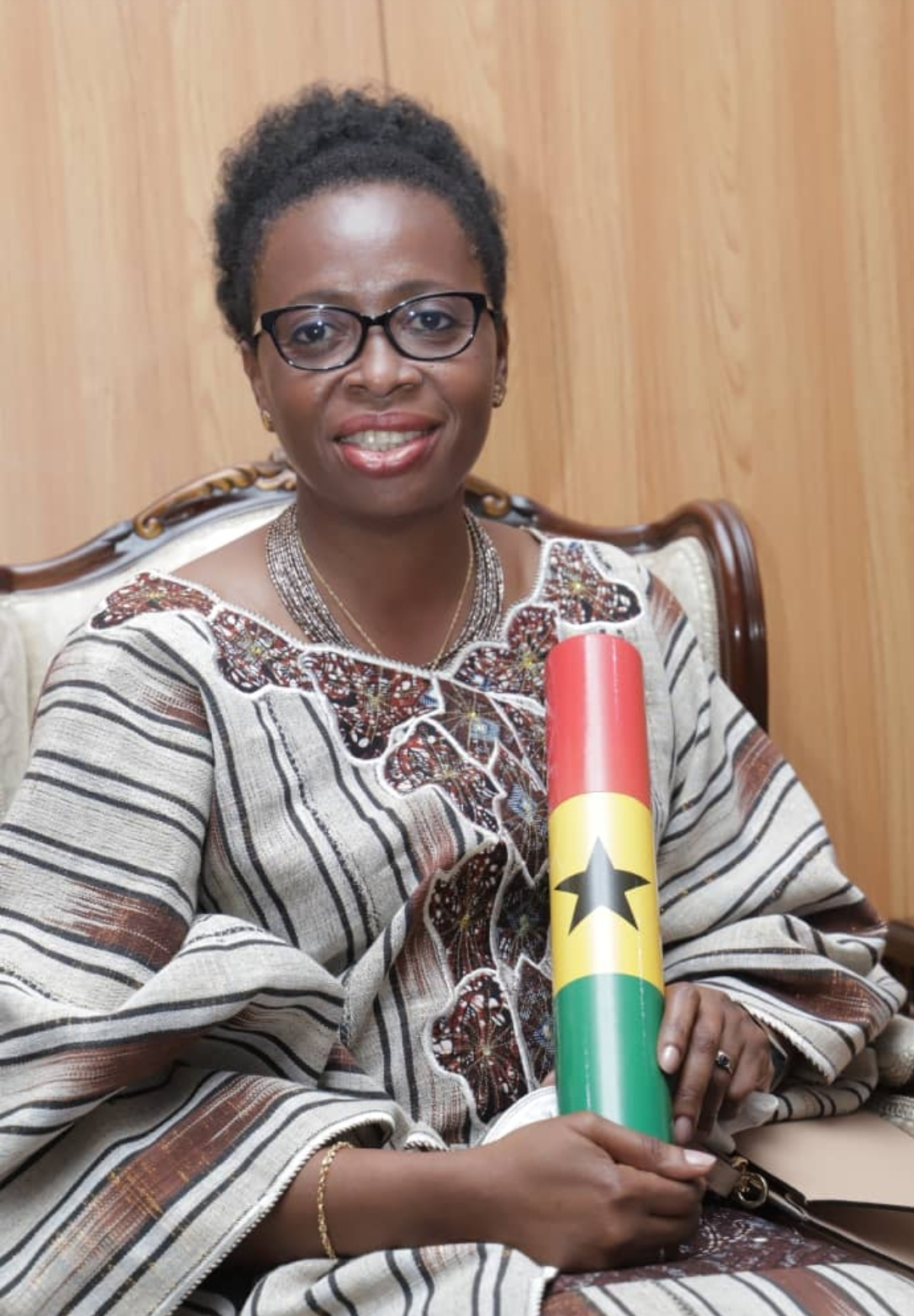
- Portrait of Genevieve Apaloo

Ghana Ambassador to Japan
- Incumbent
- Assumed office 2022
- President: Nana Akufo-Addo
- Preceded by: Frank Okyere

Personal details
- Born: Genevieve Edna Apaloo Ghana
- Children: 2
- Education: University of Ghana
- Occupation: Ambassador
- Profession: Diplomat

Genevieve Edna Apaloo is a Ghanaian career Diplomat and Ghana's current ambassador to Japan. Genevieve was once acting head of mission of the Embassy of Ghana in Washington DC, United States of America, where she was posted as Head of Chancery in October 2019.

== Early life and education ==
Apaloo attended the University of Ghana, Legon and was awarded a bachelor's degree in modern languages, with combined honors in French & Spanish. She further pursued a Master of Arts degree in international affairs from the Legon Centre for International Affairs and Diplomacy in the University of Ghana.

She holds a professional certificate in "Peace and Stability in West Africa and the Sahel", a course she took in the Netherlands, European Training Programme on Security Policy in Geneva, Switzerland and Negotiations for Peace Operations in Accra, Ghana.

== Career ==
She was appointed by President Nana Addo-Dankwa Akufo Addo to be Ghana's ambassador to Japan on 26 January 2022. Prior to being named as an ambassador she was a Foreign Service Officer at the Ministry of foreign affairs in Ghana with over 24 years experience. She is Ghana’s first Female Ambassador to Japan.

Apaloo is a career Diplomat who before her appointment as Ambassador, served in Washington DC, US. She has also served in Paris, Togo, Nigeria and the Equatorial Guinea. She played a key role in the implementation of Ghana’s Foreign Policy as well as the Asian Pacific Region. She has also served in different countries such as Equatorial Guinea, Nigeria, Togo, and France. She served as the Director of the Asia and Pacific Bureau of the Ministry of Foreign Affairs and Regional Integration from September 2017 to October 2019.

== Personal life ==
Genevieve Apaloo is married with two children. She enjoys reading, dancing, millinery, chocolate making and mentoring the youth.
