= Fatimatu Abubakar =

Ghanaian lawyer, politician and entrepreneur

- President: Nana Akuffo-Addo

Personal details
- Born: 16 September 1986 (age 39) Kumasi, Ghana
- Party: New Patriotic Party
- Children: 1
- Education: Kumasi Academy, University of Ghana, Mountcrest University College, Ghana School of Law
- Occupation: Deputy Minister for Information, Republic of Ghana and former Deputy Director of Communications, Office of the President, Jubilee House, Accra
- Profession: Lawyer
- Committees: Board Member Ghana Trade Fair Company Limited

Fatimatu Abubakar is a Ghanaian lawyer, politician and entrepreneur. She is a member of the New Patriotic Party and the current Minister for Information. Fatimatu Abubakar previously served as the Deputy Information Minister and was also the Deputy Communications Director at the Office of the President. Prior to her political appointments, she worked at the Lansdown Resort, Aburi, and SRM Engineering Limited, where she served as a house manager and a Clerk respectively. She studied Psychology and English for her first and second degrees.

Fatimatu Abubakar was appointed as the New Minister for Information on 14 February 2024, taking over from Kojo Oppong Nkrumah.

== Early life and education ==
Fatimatu was born in Kumasi in the Ashanti Region. She graduated from the University of Ghana with a bachelor's degree in psychology and English Language. In 2008, while she was schooling at the University of Ghana, she served as the Vice President of Akuafo Hall Junior Common Room and contested for the position of the Coordinating Secretary of the National Union of Ghana Students (NUGS) in 2010.

== Career and political life ==
Fatimatu currently serves as the Minister for Information and has served as deputy Minister for Information since June 2021 to February 2024. In January 2017, she was appointed the deputy director of Communications at the Flagstaff House by President Nana Akuffo-Addo. Previously, she served as Campaign aide to Akufo-Addo in the lead up to the 2016 and 2020 elections. She was also part of the Akufo-Addo's legal team during the 2020 election petition. Prior to her appointment, she worked at Lansdown Resort, Danquah Institute and SRM Engineering.
