= Emmanuel Okyere =

Ghanaian military personnel

Brigadier-General Emmanuel Okyere is a Ghanaian military personnel and served in the Ghana Army. He rose through the ranks to become Brigadier-General in the Ghana Armed Forces. He is currently serving as National Security Adviser for the Fourth Republic of Ghana under the government of Nana Akufo-Addo. He is an ex-military engineer who from 2006 to 2010 served as the General Officer Commanding the Southern Command. He succeeded Baba Issifu Kamara, whose tenure ended on January 7, 2016.
