= Ramses Cleland =

Ghanaian diplomat and senior public servant

Ramses Joseph Cleland
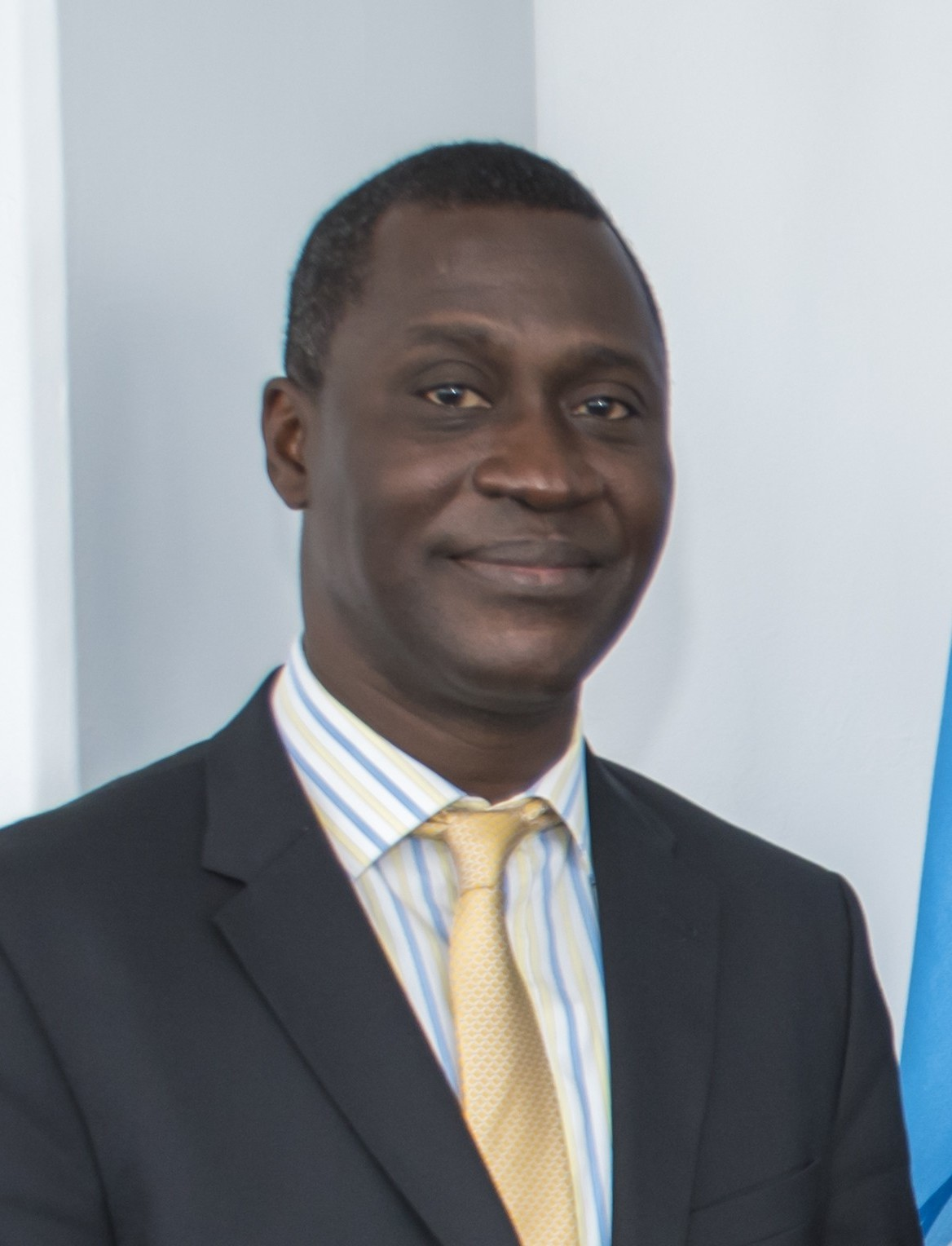

Chief Director, Ministry of Foreign Affairs and Regional Integration
- In office 2021–2025
- President: Nana Akufo-Addo; John Mahama
- Preceded by: Albert Francis Yankey
- Succeeded by: Khadija Iddrisu

Ambassador of Ghana to Switzerland
- In office September 2017 – 2021
- President: Nana Akufo-Addo
- Preceded by: Sammie Pesky Eddico
- Succeeded by: Emmanuel Kwame Asiedu Antwi

Permanent Representative of Ghana to the United Nations Office at Geneva
- In office 24 November 2017 – 2021
- President: Nana Akufo-Addo
- Preceded by: Martha Ama Akyaa Pobee
- Succeeded by: Emmanuel Kwame Asiedu Antwi

Ambassador of Ghana to Austria
- In office 2018–2020
- President: Nana Akufo-Addo
- Preceded by: Sammie Pesky Eddico (concurrently with Switzerland)
- Succeeded by: Philbert Johnson

Personal details
- Born: Ramses Joseph Cleland; August 25, 1963 (age 63) Cairo, Egypt
- Citizenship: Ghanaian
- Education: University of Ghana; University of London; BPP Law School
- Occupation: Career diplomat

Ramses Joseph Cleland (born 25 August 1963) is a Ghanaian diplomat, lawyer, and government official. He served as Ghana’s Ambassador to Switzerland and concurrently as Permanent Representative to the United Nations Office at Geneva from 2017 to 2021, and as Ambassador to Austria from 2018 to 2020. He later served as Chief Director of the Ministry of Foreign Affairs and Regional Integration from 2021 to 2025, the highest-ranking civil servant position in the ministry.

== Early life and education ==
Ramses Joseph Cleland was born on 25 August 1963 in Cairo, Egypt.

He received his secondary education at Accra Academy and his tertiary education at the University of Ghana in Accra, Ghana. He later pursued legal education in the United Kingdom, obtaining a Bachelor of Laws (LLB) degree from the University of London and BPP School of Law, London. He was called to the Ghanaian bar in 2017.

== Career ==
Cleland joined the Ministry of Foreign Affairs and Regional Integration of Ghana in 1989.

Between 1996 and 2000, he was posted to the Embassy of Ghana in Paris, France, where he served as Head of Chancery and Counsellor for Political and Economic Affairs. From 2002 to 2003, he served as Counsellor at the Embassy of Ghana in Brasília, Brazil. He was subsequently appointed Head of Chancery at the Embassy of Ghana in Abidjan, Côte d’Ivoire, where he served from 2003 to 2006.

From 2007 to 2008, Cleland served as a Research Assistant at the office of the Chairman of the African Union Commission, President John Agyekum Kufuor, President of Ghana. He later played a significant role in Ghana’s diplomatic expansion in Europe by opening Ghana’s Embassy in Dublin, Ireland, where he served as Chargé d’Affaires from 2008 to 2009.

Between 2009 and 2012, he was posted to the Ghana High Commission in London, serving as Head of the Political Section. He returned to Accra in 2013 and was appointed Director of the Europe Bureau at the Ministry of Foreign Affairs and Regional Integration, a position he held until 2016. From 2016 to 2017, he served as Acting Head of Mission at the Embassy of Ghana in Lomé, Togo, prior to his ambassadorial appointment.

As a legal practitioner, Cleland founded and heads the Cleland Legal Pruc.

=== Ambassadorial and multilateral service ===
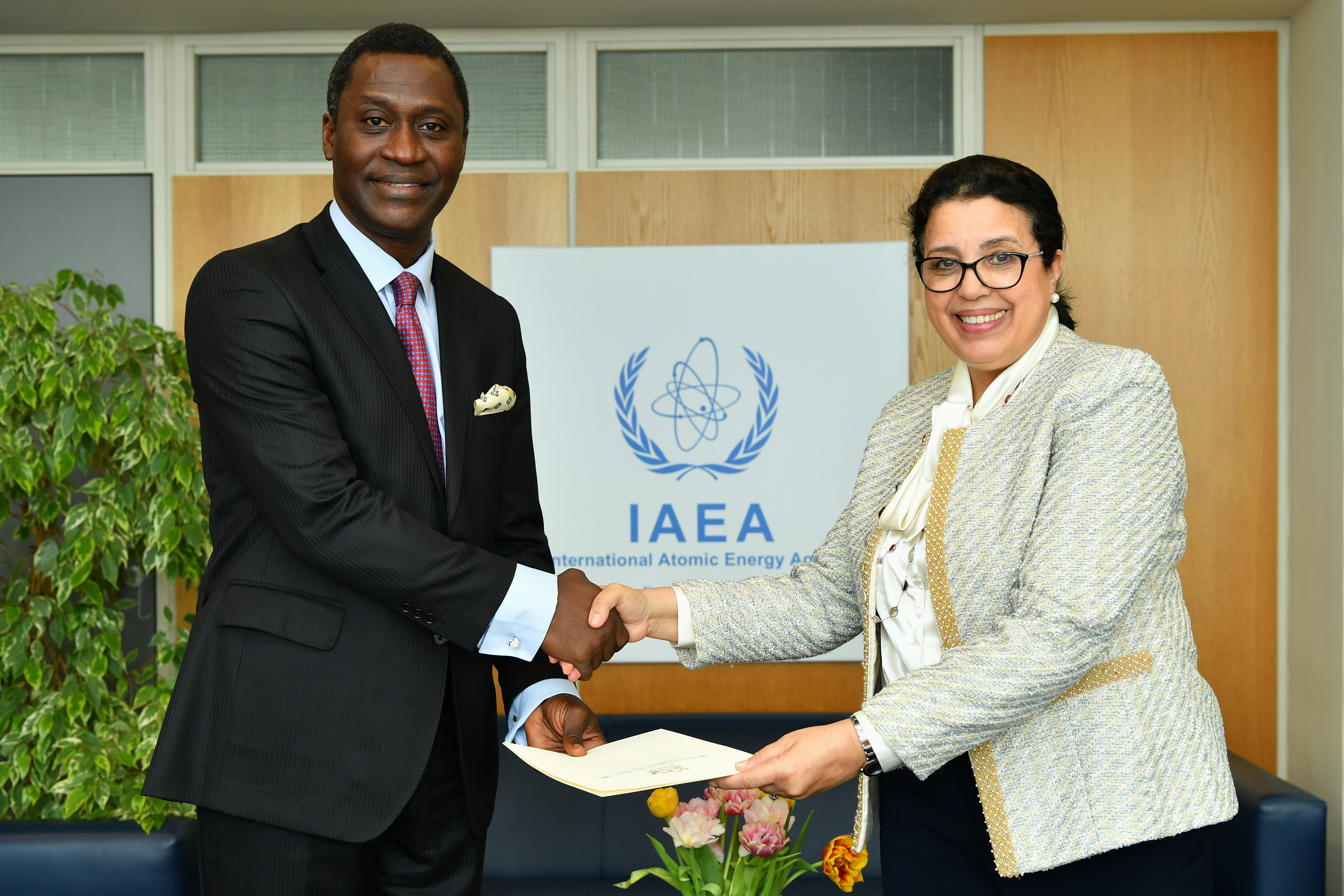
Ramses Joseph Cleland presenting his credentials to Najat Mokhtar, IAEA Acting Director General, and Head of the Department of Nuclear Sciences and Applications at the IAEA headquarters in Vienna, Austria in 2019

In September 2017, Cleland was appointed Ambassador of Ghana to Switzerland, succeeding Sammie Pesky Eddico, and was concurrently accredited as Permanent Representative of Ghana to the United Nations Office at Geneva. He formally presented his credentials on 24 November 2017 and served in that capacity until 2021.

During his tenure in Geneva, Cleland served as the Coordinator of the ECOWAS group of Ambassadors in Geneva, he also represented Ghana in multilateral diplomacy and international forums, including participation in United Nations bodies and international economic engagements such as the World Economic Forum in Davos. In 2018, he was appointed Ghana's ambassador to Austria, serving concurrently in Switzerland until 2020.

=== Chief Director, Ministry of Foreign Affairs ===
Following the completion of his ambassadorial posting, Cleland was appointed Chief Director of the Ministry of Foreign Affairs and Regional Integration.

In this role, he led the maiden Ghana–Qatar Political Consultations held in Accra in April 2025.

He also serves on the Ministerial Advisory Board of the Ministry and on the Governing Council of the Foreign Service Institute, contributing to foreign policy formulation and the professional training of Ghanaian diplomats.

== Personal life ==
Cleland is married and has four children.

Government offices
Preceded by Albert Francis Yankey	Chief Director of the Ministry of Foreign Affairs and Regional Integration; 2021–2025	Succeeded by Khadija Iddrisu
Diplomatic posts
Preceded by Sammie Pesky Eddico	Ambassador of Ghana to Switzerland; September 2017 – 2021	Succeeded by Emmanuel Kwame Asiedu Antwi
Preceded by Martha Ama Akyaa Pobee	Permanent Representative of Ghana to the United Nations Office at Geneva; 24 November 2017 – 2021	Succeeded by Emmanuel Kwame Asiedu Antwi
Preceded by Sammie Pesky Eddico	Ambassador of Ghana to Austria; 2018 – 2020	Succeeded by Philbert Johnson
