= Harriet Sena Siaw-Boateng =

Representative

Amb. Harriet Sena Siaw-Boateng

Ghana Ambassador to Belgium
- Incumbent
- Assumed office 2019
- President: Nana Akuffo-Addo

Personal details
- Born: Ghana
- Education: BPP Law School; Ghana School of Law; Oxford University; University of Ghana; OLA Secondary School
- Occupation: Ambassador, Ghana’s Permanent Representative to The European Union
- Profession: Lawyer

Harriet Sena Siaw-Boateng was the Ambassador to Belgium and Ghana’s Permanent Representative to The European Union. She was commissioned by President Nana Addo Dankwa Akufo-Addo from February 1, 2019 until September 22, 2023. Harriet Boateng is a barrister and solicitor of the Supreme Court of Ghana.

== Education ==
Harriet Boateng had her G.C.E. '0' Level education at Achimota, 1986. In 1988, she had her G.C.E. 'A' Level at OLA Secondary School. She has since furthered her education at the University of Ghana, Oxford University, UK and BPP Law School, England studying B.A. (Hons) French And Linguistics, International Relations and Diplomatic Practice and Legal Practice respectively. She obtained her certificate to practice law at the Ghana School of Law in 2016.

== Career ==
On the first of February 2019, Harriet Boateng was commissioned as the Ambassador-designate to Belgium and Ghana’s Permanent Representative to The European Union.
