= Clara Napaga Tia Sulemana =

Ghanaian politician

Clara Napaga Tia Sulemana (born 1987) is a female Ghanaian politician and a presidential staffer of the Nana Akufo-Addo led government. She is the daughter of Alhaji Tia Sulemana, a founding father of the New Patriotic Party in Ghana.

== Education ==
Napaga had her Bachelor of Arts Degree in Integrated Development Studies with focus in social, political and historical studies from the University for Development Studies.

== Career ==
Upon completion of her undergraduate study, Napaga started her journey in politics as a campaign aide to the New Patriotic Party (NPP). She was later appointed as a presidential staffer when the party won the 2016 presidential elections. Sulemana sits on the governing board of the Tamale Teaching Hospital. In 2022 when the NPP government decided to scrap off the Ministry for Special Development Initiatives (MSDI) as one of the measures by the government to reduce the number of Ministries and ministers in its second term, she was then appointed as Coordinator for Special Development Initiatives.

In June 2021, President Nana Akufo-Addo appointed Clara Napaga Tia Sulemana as the Coordinator for Special Development Initiatives, following the dissolution of the Ministry for Special Development Initiatives. In this role, she is responsible for overseeing projects such as the Infrastructure for Poverty Eradication Programme (IPEP) and serving as a liaison between development authorities and the presidency.
