= Kenneth Agyei Kuranchie =

Ghanaian journalist and politician (born 1969)

- Born: Kenneth Agyei Kuranchie; August 5, 1969 (age 56)
- Occupation(s): Journalist, editor, author, politician, lawyer
- Organization: The Daily Searchlight newspaper
- Children: 4

Kenneth Agyei Kuranchie (born in Tepa, Ashanti Region on 5 August 1969) is a Ghanaian journalist and former board member of the National Media Commission. He is known publicly as a member of the New Patriotic Party (NPP) of Ghana. He started off as a block moulder, worked with the then P&P Newspaper as a stringer, becoming an editor for the Chronicles and later setting up the Daily Searchlight newspaper

In 2013, Kuranchie was convicted of criminal contempt and sentenced to 10 days imprisonment by the Supreme Court.

== Early life ==
Kuranchie was born on 5 August 1969 in Tepa, Ashanti Region. He studied at St. Mary's International School in Sunyani, Brong-Ahafo Region, Opoku Ware Secondary School, the University of Ghana and Mountcrest University in Accra for his LLB.

== Career ==
He started practicing journalism at the P&P entertainment newspaper, and subsequently at Guide newspaper (now known as Daily Guide). He also worked at The Ghanaian Chronicle. He then set up his own paper, The Daily Searchlight.

In 2013, Kuranchie was convicted of criminal contempt for a publication in his newspaper Daily Searchlight and not showing remorse, and sentenced to 10 days imprisonment by the Supreme Court.

He is an author of several books including 'Principles of Applied and Practical Journalism (2019), as well as the children's books "Journey to Ada", "The Rabbit, The Sparrow and The Lizard", "In Search of Vengeance" and "The Story of Fate".

"Journey to Ada", and "The Rabbit, The Sparrow and The Lizard" have been accredited by Ghana's Commission for Curriculum and Assessment (NACCA) as supplementary readers for primary schools in Ghana.

Kenneth Agyei Kuranchie owns an NGO and a clothing factory.

== Politics ==
In June 2020 Kuranchie contested in the Parliamentary Primaries of the New Patriotic Party to represent the Okaikoi North Constituency in Ghana's parliamentary elections but lost to Fuseini Issah the incumbent member of parliament at the time.

In June 2023, he filed a suit against Former President John Dramani Mahama, the presidential candidate of the opposition National Democratic Congress (NDC.) on the basis that he (Mahama) is not qualified to contest in the 2024 elections. Mr Kuranchie said he wanted the Supreme Court to agree that the presidential term was four years and that once a president was out of office, he was still an employee of the state.

== Personal life ==
Kuranchie is peacefully married with four children.
