= Amma Twum-Amoah =

Ghanaian diplomat

Her Excellency Amma Adomaa Twum-Amoah
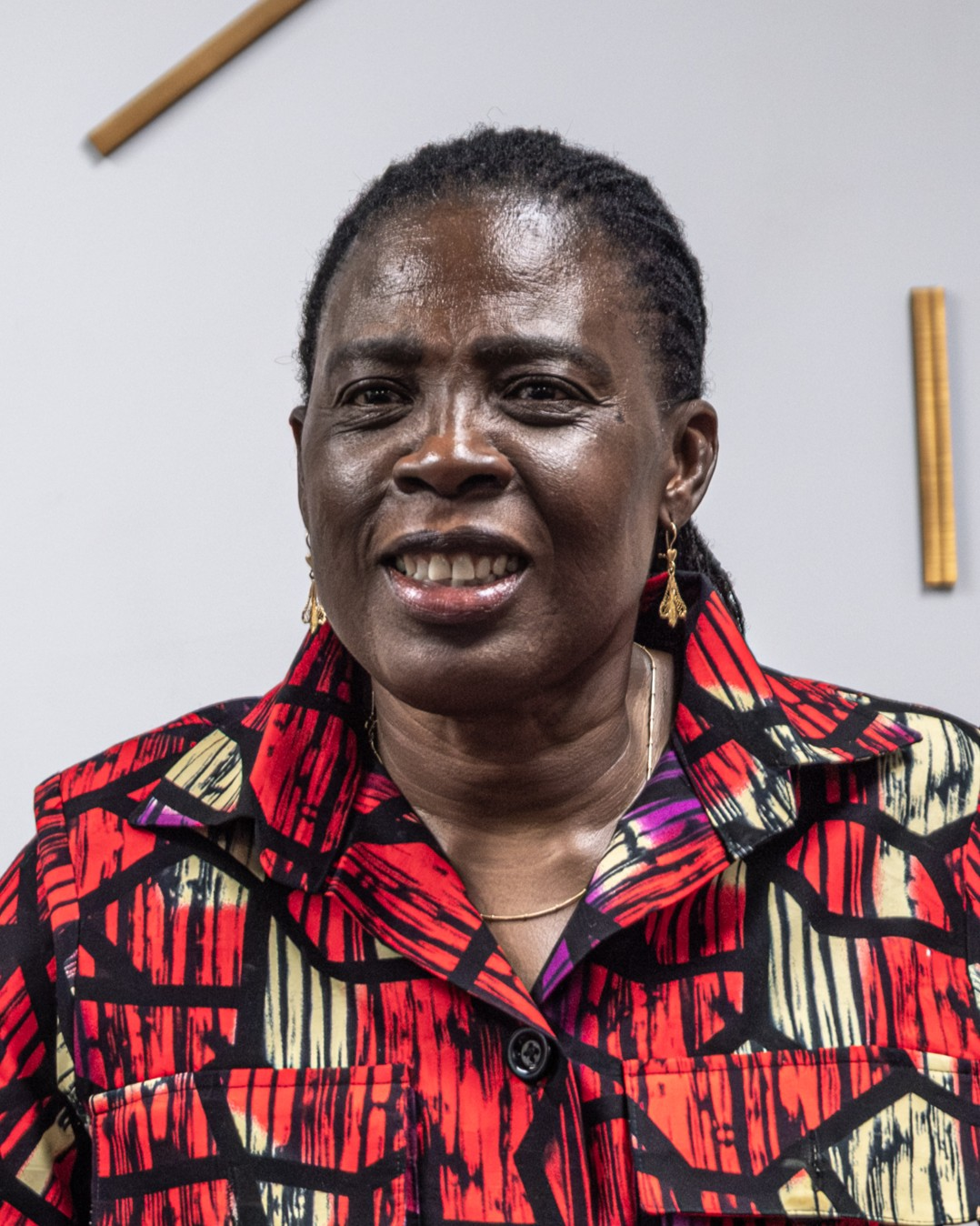
- Twum-Amoah in 2026

Commissioner for the African Union Department of Health, Humanitarian Affairs and Social Development
- Incumbent
- Assumed office March 2025
- Preceded by: Minata Samaté Cessouma

Ghana's Ambassador to Ethiopia
- In office June 2018 – May 2024

Personal details
- Born: Amma Adomaa Twum
- Education: University of Cape Coast; University of Oxford
- Profession: Diplomat

Amma Adomaa Twum-Amoah is a Ghanaian diplomat who has worked for the foreign relations of Ghana in various capacities. She is the current Commissioner for the African Union Department of Health, Humanitarian Affairs and Social Development (HHS) of the African Union Commission elected during the 38th Ordinary Session of the Assembly in February 2025.

Before joining the commission, Ambassador Twum-Amoah also served as the former Ambassador of the Republic of Ghana to Eritrea, Djibouti, Somalia, South Sudan and Ethiopia. She was the Permanent Representative to the African Union and United Nations Economic Commission for Africa.

== Career ==
Amma previously served in key civil service and government positions in Ghana and held a diplomatic post in Australia as Acting High Commissioner/Minister-Counsellor, for Ghana High Commission at Canberra in Australia from October 2005 to February 2006.

During her work in Australia, she led a team of four Officers to reopen Ghana’s High Commission in Canberra and represented the Government of Ghana in Australia until the arrival of a substantive High Commissioner in March 2006 in the person of His Excellency Mr. Kofi Sekyiamah.

The Ghanaian Diplomat served as Counsellor/Head of Chancery for the Ghana Permanent Mission to the United Nations in Geneva, Switzerland from September 2000 to August 2002. In Geneva, Amma served as a member of the delegation for Ghana presenting a report on human rights discrimination. She was part of the team that presented the report of the Ninth Meeting of the Programme Coordinating Board of the Joint United Nations Programme on HIV/AIDS, Geneva, in May 2000.

Her Excellency Twum-Amoah has served the people of Ghana too in the following capacities: Deputy Director of Policy Planning and Research Bureau at the Ministry of Foreign Affairs in Accra from October 2004 to October 2005 during which she processed requests for agreement for new Envoys to Ghana among other tasks until September 2002 to March 2003 when she became the acting director for that Ministry.

She served as acting Head of Mission of the Embassy of Ghana in Washington, D.C. in the United States on November 17, 2012.

She served once again, as acting Head of Mission for the Embassy from February 1, 2014, to October 16, 2014, before Lieutenant General Joseph Henry Smith was named Ghana Ambassador to the United States.

Amma Twum-Amoah served in Ghana as the Director of Protocol Bureau for the Ministry of Foreign Affairs and Regional Integration from June 2011 to November 2012.

== Education ==
Amma Twum-Amoah attended The University Of Cape Coast in Ghana and the University of Oxford in England. Her Excellency Amma Twum-Amoah is a Chevening Scholar, and holds a Master's in Business Administration from the University of Canberra, Australia.

== See also ==
- Foreign relations of Ghana
- List of ambassadors and high commissioners of Ghana
