= Frederick Daniel Laryea =

Ghanaian diplomat

Amb. Frederick Daniel Laryea

Ambassador to Ivory Coast
- Incumbent
- Assumed office June 2017
- President: Nana Akuffo-Addo

Personal details
- Born: Fredrick Daniel laryea N/A Ghana
- Party: New Patriotic Party

Frederick Daniel Laryea is a Ghanaian diplomat and a member of the New Patriotic Party of Ghana. He is currently Ghana's ambassador to Ivory Coast.

== Ambassadorial appointment ==
In June 2017, President Nana Akuffo-Addo named Frederick Laryea as Ghana's ambassador to Ivory Coast. He was among twenty-two other distinguished Ghanaians who were named to head various diplomatic Ghanaian mission in the world.
