= Salifu Saeed =

Ghanaian politician

The Honourable Salifu Saeed

Regional Minister of Northern Region
- In office February 2017 – February 2025
- President: Nana Akuffo-Addo
- Succeeded by: Ali Adolf John

Personal details
- Born: Ghana
- Party: New Patriotic Party

Salifu Saeed is a Ghanaian politician and a member of the New Patriotic Party in Ghana. He is the Northern Regional minister of Ghana. He was appointed by President Nana Addo Danquah Akuffo-Addo in January 2017 and was approved by the Members of Parliament in February 2017.

== Early life ==
Saeed is a former District Chief Executive (DCE) of Nanumba-South who was born on 28 December 1978. He comes from Bimbila.

== Education ==
Salifu Saeed attended Bagabaga Training College now Babaga College of Education for his post secondary certificate 'A' in 1990–1992. He furthered to the University for Development Studies where he earned BA in Integrated Development studies in 1995–1999.

He also obtained his Masters of Development Management (with Research) at Ghana Institute of Management and Public Administration (GIMPA) in 2011–2012.
