= Ministry of Railway Development (Ghana) =

Government ministry of Ghana

Agency overview
- Formed: Government of Ghana
- Jurisdiction: Government of Ghana
- Headquarters: Accra, Ghana
- Agency executives: Hon John-Peter Amewu, Minister; Desmond Boateng, AG Chief Director
- Website: www.grda.gov.gh

Railway network of Ghana

The Ministry of Railway Development of Ghana was created with the core responsible to ensure and increase infrastructural growth and service delivery in Ghana's transport sector to help ease pressure on the other means of transport. The ministry is also tasked with the responsibility of ensuring quality, effective and a more secure means of traveling and transporting goods and services within Ghana and the neighboring countries.

== History of the Ministry ==
The formation of the Ministry is to ensure the rapid growth of a modern and quality rail network in Ghana and the neighboring countries. The ministry was formed by H.E. Nana Addo Dankwa Akufo-Addo, the President of the Republic of Ghana in February, 2017. One major reason behind the railway network is to help convey goods and services from the rural areas to the cities to increase productivity to strengthen the economy apart from being the source of transport within the country and to extend the rail lines to the neighboring countries to make trade effective between Ghana and the countries involved. Before the creation of this Ministry, the existing network consisted of three lines: the Western Line, the Eastern Line and the Central Line (from Huni Valley to Kotoku). These rail networks were built during the colonial period that existed at independence in 1957.

== Leadership ==
Ministry of Railway Development consists of several departments and agencies. In total, the Ministry is headed by a Sector Minister, HON JOHN-PETER AMEWU, MP, and each agency or department has a director as an official head. In view of this, the Ghana Railway Development Authority and Ghana Railway Company Limited are the implementing agencies of the Ministry of Railway Development.

== Agencies ==
The Ministry has two operational agencies:

- Ghana Railway Company Limited :

Ghana Railway Company Ltd was created in 2001 under the companies code 1963(Act 179) to offer consignment, parcel and passenger services using available resources.

- Ghana Railway Development Authority :

The Ghana Railway Development Authority was formed under the Railways Act 2008,(Act 779) to boost the growth of railway systems in the country with the administration and the improvement of the railway assets.

== Directorates ==
The following are directorates of the Ministry of Railway Development with each directorate headed by a director. :

- Finance and Administration
- Policy Planning
- Monitoring and Evaluation
- Research, Statistics & Information Management
- Human Resource Development

== Location ==
Ministry of Railways Development - Ghana

PMB Ministries - Accra.

== See also ==
- Government of Ghana
- Transport in Ghana
- Rail transport in Ghana
- Ghana Railway Corporation
- List of railway companies
