= Gifty Eugenia Kwofie =

Ghanaian politician

Gifty Eugenia Kusi (nee Kwofie)

Mp for Tarkwa-Nsuaem
- In office 7 January 2001 – 6 January 2017
- Preceded by: Joseph Ghansah
- Succeeded by: George Mireku Duker

Personal details
- Born: 11 February 1958 (age 68)
- Party: New Patriotic Party
- Education: University of Ghana
- Occupation: Politician and Principal Researcher Assistant

Gifty Eugenia Kusi (nee Kwofie) (born 11 February 1958) is a Ghanaian politician. She was the member of the Fourth parliament of the Fourth Republic of Ghana to the Tarkwa-Nsuaem (Ghana parliament constituency) from 2001 to 2017. She is also the principal research assistant in the department of Community Health at the University of Ghana Medical School-Korle-Bu.

== Early life ==
Kusi (nee Kwofie) hails from Nsuaem-Tarkwa in the Western Region of Ghana.

== Education ==
Kusi holds a Master of Philosophy degree in sociology from the University of Ghana in 1999.

== Personal life ==
Kusi is married with four children. She is a Christian who attends the Church of Pentecost.

== Politics ==
Kusi started her career in politics from the year 2001, when she contested and won for the Member of Parliament seat on the ticket of the New Patriotic Party (NPP) for the Tarkwa-Nsueam Constituency. She retained the Tarkwa-Nsueam Constituency seat for 16 years, making her a member of the 3rd, 4th, 5th, and 6th parliament of the 4th Republic of Ghana. She is a member of New Patriotic Party(NPP) Disciplinary Committee, the Parliament of Ghana Business Committee, the Parliament of Ghana Committee on Gender and Children. and the Parliament of Ghana committee on Health. She is the Deputy Western regional Minister.

== Career ==
She was the Principal Research Assistant in the Department of Community Health at UGMS. She also worked at Korle-Bu Teaching Hospital.
