= Rasheed Seidu Inusa =

Ghanaian diplomat

Amb. Rasheed Seidu Inusa

Ambassador-at-large
- Incumbent
- Assumed office July 2017
- President: Nana Akuffo-Addo

Personal details
- Born: Ghana
- Party: New Patriotic Party

Rasheed Seidu Inusa is a Ghanaian diplomat and a member of the New Patriotic Party of Ghana. He is currently Ghana's Ambassador-at-large.

== Ambassadorial appointment ==
In July 2017, President Nana Akuffo-Addo appointed Rasheed Inusa as Ghana's Ambassador-at-Large. He was one of twenty-two distinguished Ghanaians named to head various diplomatic Ghanaian missions around the world.
