= Elizabeth Salamatu Forgor =

Ghanaian diplomat

Amb. Elizabeth Salamatu Forgor

Ambassador to Namibia
- In office July 2017 – January 2025
- President: Nana Akuffo-Addo
- Preceded by: Alhaji Abdul Rahman Haruna Attah

Personal details
- Born: Bole, Ghana
- Party: New Patriotic Party
- Profession: Teacher, Diplomat

Elizabeth Salamatu Forgor is a Ghanaian diplomat and a member of the New Patriotic Party of Ghana. She was Ghana's High Commissioner to Namibia between 2017 and 2025.

== Politics ==
In 2003, she contested and lost the New Patriotic Party's primaries in the Bole Constituency to represent her party in the 2004 Ghanaian General Elections.

Forgor was appointed the District Chief Executive of Bole by John Kufuor during his second term as president. However, in November 2007, her appointment was terminated by the then president.

== Ambassadorial appointment ==
In July 2017, President Nana Akuffo-Addo named Elizabeth Forgor as Ghana's ambassador to Namibia. She was among twenty two other distinguished Ghanaians who were named to head various diplomatic Ghanaian missions in the world.
