= Paul Okoh =

Ghanaian politician

Amb. Paul Okoh

Ambassador to Egypt
- Incumbent
- Assumed office January 2017
- President: Nana Akufo-Addo

Member of Parliament for Asutifi North Constituency
- In office 7 January 2009 – 6 January 2013
- Succeeded by: Benhazin Joseph Dahah

Member of Parliament for Asutifi North Constituency
- In office 7 January 2005 – 6 January 2009
- President: John Kufuor

Personal details
- Born: 22 February 1949 (age 77)
- Died: 19th February 2024
- Party: New Patriotic Party
- Children: 9
- Education: University of Cape Coast
- Profession: Educationist

Paul Okoh was a Ghanaian diplomat and a member of the New Patriotic Party of Ghana. He is currently Ghana's ambassador to Egypt.

== Early life and education ==
Okoh was born on 22 February 1949. He hails from Kenyasi No. 1 in the Brong Ahafo region of Ghana. He had both his Diploma in Education and Bachelor of Arts in Religion from the University of Cape Coast.

== Career ==
Okoh is an Educationist. He was the assistant director and Assistant Headmaster of Dompoase Secondary School in Dompoase Adansi. He was also a life skills teacher and a House Master at Prempeh College, a senior High School in Kumasi in the mid to late 1990s

== Ambassadorial appointment ==
In July 2017, President Nana Akuffo-Addo named Paul Okoh as Ghana's ambassador to Egypt. He was among twenty two other distinguished Ghanaians who were named to head various diplomatic Ghanaian missions in the world.

== Politics ==
Okoh is a member of the New Patriotic Party. He was the member of parliament for the Asutifi North Constituency in the Brong Ahafo region of Ghana. This was in the 3rd, 4th and 5th parliaments of the 4th republic of Ghana 1.

=== 2000 Elections ===
In the year 2000, Okoh won the Ghanaian general elections as the member of parliament for the Asutifi North constituency of the Brong Ahafo Region of Ghana. He won on the ticket of the New Patriotic Party and thus represented the Asutifi North constituency in the 3rd parliament of the 4th republic of Ghana. Okoh's constituency was a part of the 14 parliamentary seats out of 21 seats won by the New Patriotic Party in that election for the Brong Ahafo Region. The New Patriotic Party won a majority total of 100 parliamentary seats out of 200 seats in the 3rd parliament of the 4th republic of Ghana. Okoh was elected with 7682 votes out of 15,978 total valid votes cast. This was equivalent to 49.1% of the total valid votes cast. He was elected over Baah Danquah Emmanuel of the National Democratic Congress, Georges Nsiah-Afriyie an independent candidate, Norbert Anane-Nyarko of the Convention People's Party and Darkwa Anthony of the National Reform Party. These obtained 6,895, 906, 147 and 0 votes respectively out of the total valid votes cast. These were equivalent to 44.1%, 5.8%, 0.9% and 0% respectively of total valid votes cast.

=== 2004 Elections ===
In the 2004 Ghanaian general elections, Okoh was elected for the second time as the Member of parliament for the Asutifi North constituency. He won the elections on the ticket of the New Patriotic Party. Okoh's constituency was a part of the 14 parliamentary seats out of a total 24 seats won by the New Patriotic Party in that election for the Brong Ahafo Region. The New Patriotic Party won a majority total of 128 parliamentary seats out of 230 seats in that elections. Okoh was elected with 9,741votes out of 18,226 total valid votes cast, equivalent to 53.40% of total valid votes cast. He was elected over Samuel Nana Asamoah of the Convention People's Party and Eric Addae of the National Democratic Congress. These obtained 1.00% and 45.60% respectively of total valid votes cast.

=== 2008 Elections ===
In the 2008 Ghanaian general elections, Okoh was elected with 10,028 votes out of the 20,917 valid votes cast equivalent to 47.9% of the total valid votes cast. He was elected over Eric Addae of the National Democratic Congress, Emmanuel Osei Kofi of the Democratic Freedom Party, Yaa Durowaa of the Democratic People's Party, Badu Augustine of the Convention People's Party and Patrick Kennus Boakye an independent candidate. These obtained 41.60%, 0.57%, 0.21%5, 0.64%, and 9.05% respectively of the total valid votes cast in the 2008 Ghanaian general elections.

== Personal life ==
Okoh is married with nine children. He is a Christian and a member of the Catholic Church.
