= Joseph Tetteh =

Ghanaian politician

Hon. Joseph Tetteh MP

Member of Parliament, Deputy Regional Minister
- President: Nana Akuffo-Addo

Personal details
- Born: Ghana
- Party: New Patriotic Party

Joseph Tetteh is a Ghanaian politician and a member of parliament of the Parliament of Ghana. He is a member of the New Patriotic Party and the deputy regional minister of the Eastern Region of Ghana.

== Early life and education ==
He was born on 15 May 1966. A certificate in public procurement has been awarded to Joseph Tetteh by the Graduate School of Government Leadership.

== Political life ==
In March 2017, President Nana Akufo-Addo, named Tetteh one of the ten deputy regional ministers who would form part of his government. He was vetted by the Appointments Committee of the Parliament of Ghana in the same month. He was approved by the committee and his name was forwarded to Speaker of Parliament for further approval by the general house of parliament.
