= Edward Boateng =

Ghanaian diplomat and politician

Amb. Edward Boateng
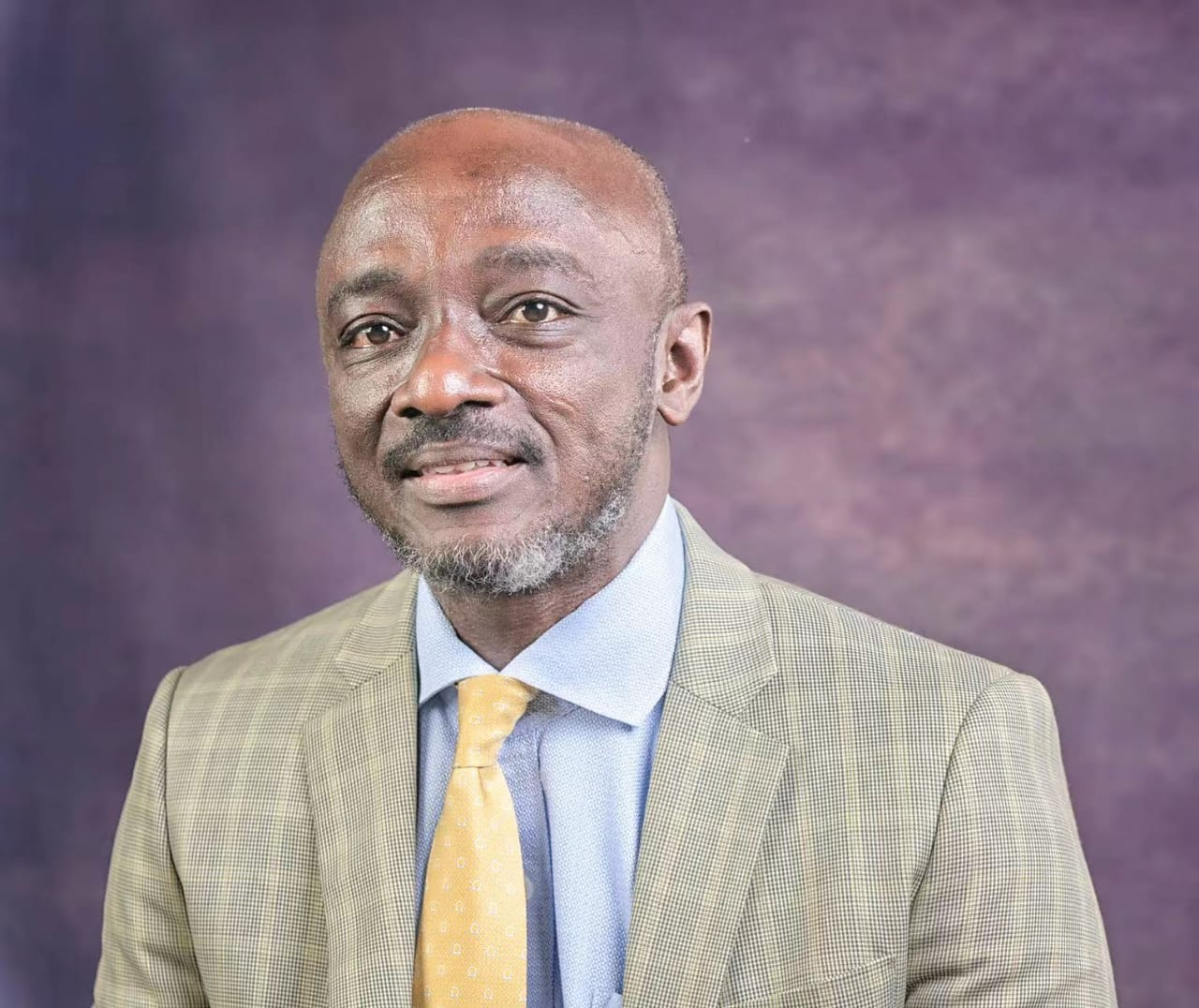

Ambassador to China
- Incumbent
- Assumed office June 2017
- President: Nana Akuffo-Addo

Personal details
- Born: Ghana
- Party: New Patriotic Party

Ambassador Edward Boateng is a Ghanaian diplomat, business executive, politician, and member of the New Patriotic Party. As a diplomat, Edward has impacted government policies in Ghana and, in recent times, bilateral relations between Ghana and China.

He was the Director-General of Ghana's State Interests and Governance Authority (SIGA) from December 2021 to November 2023, succeeding Stephen Asamoah Boateng. SIGA is an institution established by an Act of Parliament, Act 990, to ensure efficiency and profitability in state-owned enterprises while promoting good corporate governance.

== Education ==
Ambassador Boateng holds an MBA from Clark-Atlanta University (USA), a Post Graduate diploma from Yale University (USA), and a bachelor's degree in Economics and Law from the Kwame Nkrumah University of Science and Technology in Ghana.

== Personal life ==
Ambassador Boateng is married with four children.

== Ambassadorial Appointment ==
In June 2017, President Nana Akuffo-Addo named Edward Boateng as Ghana's ambassador to China with concurrent accreditation to the Republic of Mongolia and the Democratic People’s Republic of Korea. He was among twenty-two other distinguished Ghanaians who were named to head various Ghanaian diplomatic missions in the world.

== Career Life Before Ambassadorial Appointment ==
He worked at Turner Broadcasting on the strategic product development and international sales team. He facilitated the company's entry into Africa and went on to be a senior executive member of the company's Europe, Middle East, and Africa (EMEA) unit, in London and later in South Africa.

Prior to his ambassadorial appointment, Ambassador Boateng was primarily recognized as a media mogul and the founder of Pan African media and entertainment conglomerate Global Media Alliance (GMA), which he set up in South Africa in the year 1998 and later moved to Ghana in 2001. The media company is one of Ghana's most popular media, communication, and events management firms with diversified radio stations: Happy FM and YFM; a television station: eTV Ghana, a media education center: e-Academy, and multiple cinema houses under its wing.
