= Perry Curtis Kwabla Okudzeto =

Ghanaian politician

Deputy Minister
- Incumbent
- Assumed office March 2017
- President: Nana Akuffo-Addo

Personal details
- Born: Ghana
- Party: New Patriotic Party
- Relations: Valadin Kofi Ahedor

Curtis Perry Kwabla Okudzeto is a Ghanaian politician. He is a member of the New Patriotic Party, (NPP). Curtis Perry Kwabla Okudzeto is a Deputy Minister at the Ministry of Youth & Sports. He was a former deputy Information Minister.

== Education and career ==
He attended Keta Secondary School and Accra High School. He also studied Public Relations, Marketing and Advertising at the Ghana Institute of Journalism, Accra. Okudzeto also acquired a Masters of Arts Degree in International Public Relations from Cardiff University, Wales, United Kingdom.

He worked with the New Times Corporations, Information Service Department (North Tongu District), Keta Sandlanders Football Club (Division 2 Club) and Da Aagency.

== Politics ==
Okudzeto was appointed for the post of the deputy director of Communication and acting director of Communications of the New Patriotic Party at 2012 and 2016 Campaigns.
