= Nurah Gyeile =

Ghanaian academic and agriculturalist

Minister of State for Food and Agriculture
- Incumbent
- Assumed office April 2017
- President: Nana Akuffo-Addo

Personal details
- Born: Ghana
- Party: New Patriotic Party

Nurah Gyeile is a Ghanaian academic and agricultural expert. He is a member of the New Patriotic Party and serves as the minister for food and agriculture.

== Career ==
Nurah Gyeile was employed at the Kwame Nkrumah University of Science and Technology and lectured at the Agricultural Economics, Agribusiness & Extension of the College of Agriculture and Natural Resources. In March 2017, President Nana Akufo-Addo nominated him to the position of minister of state in the Ministry of Agriculture. He met the Appointments Committee of the Parliament of Ghana where he was vetted to ascertain his level of knowledge and vision for the position he had been nominated to handle. He was approved the members of parliament in April 2017.
