= Kwasi Owusu-Yeboa =

Ghanaian diplomat

Amb. Kwasi Owusu-Yeboa

Ambassador to Togo
- Incumbent
- Assumed office July 2017
- President: Nana Akuffo-Addo

Personal details
- Born: Ghana
- Party: New Patriotic Party

Kwasi Owusu-Yeboa is a Ghanaian diplomat and a member of the New Patriotic Party of Ghana. He is currently Ghana's ambassador to Togo.

== Ambassadorial appointment ==
In July 2017, President Nana Akuffo-Addo named Kwasi Owusu-Yeboa as Ghana's ambassador to Togo. He was among twenty two other distinguished Ghanaians who were named to head various diplomatic Ghanaian mission in the world.
