= Gina Blay =

Ghanaian diplomat

Amb. Gina Ama Blay His Excellency
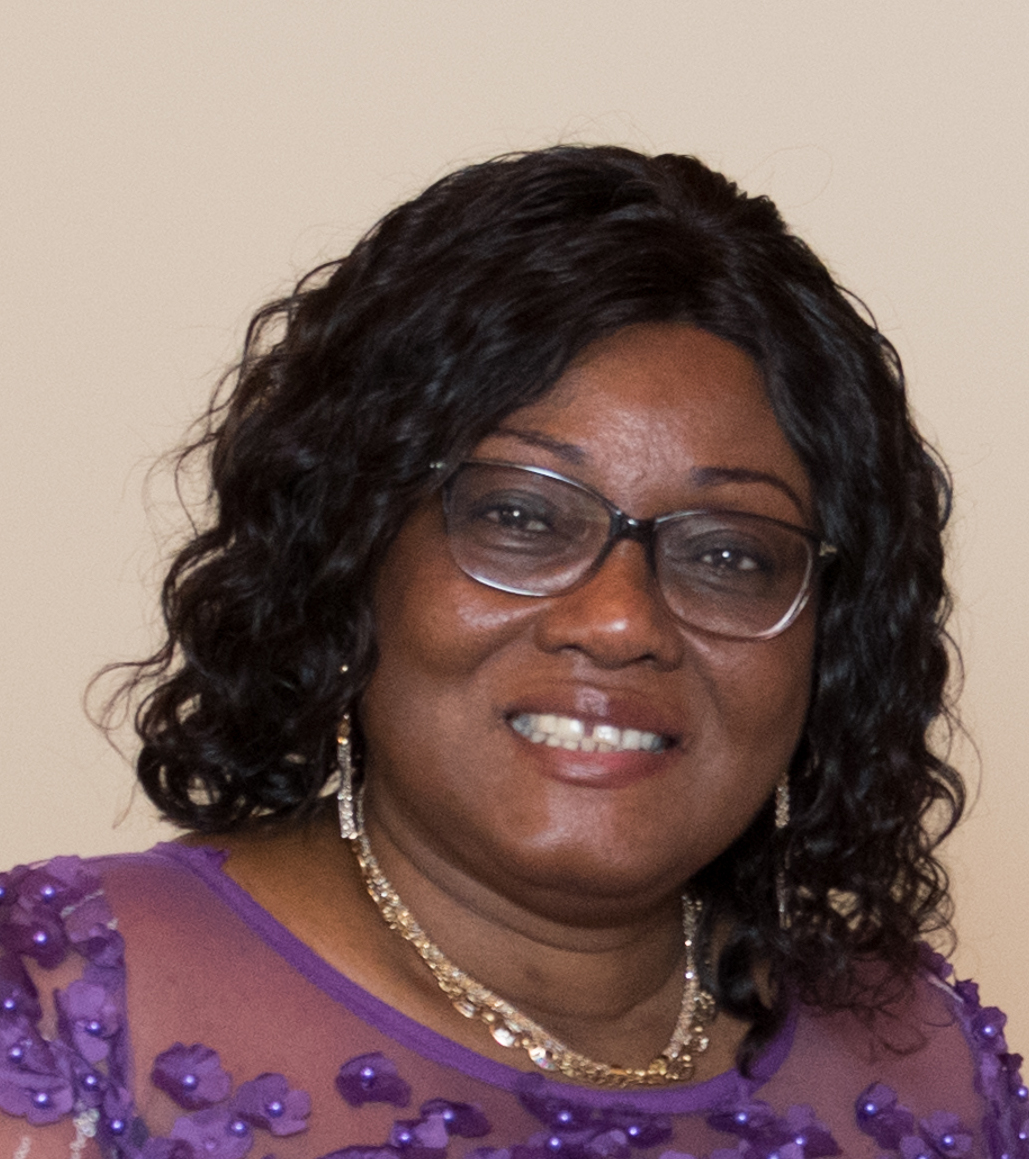

Ambassador to Germany
- In office June 2017 – December 2024
- President: Nana Akuffo-Addo
- Succeeded by: Professor Ohene Adjei

Personal details
- Born: 29 October 1956 (age 69) Ghana
- Party: New Patriotic Party
- Spouse: Freddie Blay
- Relations: Husband
- Education: University of Ghana
- Occupation: Public Relations Officer, Diplomat

Gina Ama Blay (born 29 October 1956) is a Ghanaian journalist and diplomat and a sympathizer of the New Patriotic Party of Ghana. She is currently Ghana's ambassador to Germany.

== Educational life ==
Gina Blay is a past student of OLA Girls Senior High School in Ho. She obtained a Bachelor of Arts degree from the University of Ghana and a post-graduate diploma in Journalism and Mass Communication.

== Working life ==
Blay began her career in 1981 as the Public Relations Officer of the Prices & Incomes Board. She later moved to the Achimota Brewery Company Limited as the Public Relations Manager, where she edited and published the brewery's magazine, ABC News. She was the Chief Executive Officer of Western Publication Limited, a print media house (publishers of the Daily Guide newspaper and other publications), from 1992 until her appointment as Ambassador in June 2017. She aided in the growth of the business from a family-run operation to one of the largest media houses in Ghana.

She served on the boards of several companies and organizations in Ghana, including the Social Security and National Insurance Trust (SSNIT), Ghana Telecom, Ghana News Agency, the National Media Commission, and the World Association of Newspapers. She chaired the Board of the Mokola Marketing Company Limited and was President of the Private Newspapers Publishers Association of Ghana (PRINPAG) for ten years.

== Battle with cancer ==
She was diagnosed with breast cancer in 2008 and had a series of chemotherapy treatments.

== Ambassadorial appointment ==
In June 2017, President Nana Akuffo-Addo appointed Blay as Ghana's ambassador to Germany. She was among eight other distinguished Ghanaians who were named to head various Ghanaian diplomatic missions around the world.

== Awards ==
- Media Communications Entrepreneur Award for the year 2016

== Personal life ==
Blay is married to Freddie Blay, a Ghanaian lawyer, politician, and former National Chairman of the New Patriotic Party. Together, they have three children. In her spare time, she enjoys swimming and reading.
