= Sophia Horner-Sam =

Ghanaian diplomat (1949–2026)

Amb. Sophia Horner-Sam

Ambassador to the Netherlands
- In office July 2017 – 2020
- President: Nana Akuffo-Addo

Personal details
- Born: 21 July 1949
- Died: 19 September 2026 (aged 77)
- Party: New Patriotic Party
- Children: 4 Daughters

Sophia Horner-Sam (21 July 1949 – 19 September 2026) was a Ghanaian diplomat and politician under President Nana Akuffo-Addo of New Patriotic Party.

== Life and career ==
Horner-Sam was born on 21 July 1949. She served as Deputy Western Regional Minister and Deputy Minister of Ports, Harbours and Railways during the John Agyekum Kufour administration. In July 2017, President Nana Akuffo-Addo appointed her as Ghana's ambassador to the Kingdom of Netherlands.

Horner-Sam died on 19 September 2026, at the age of 77.
