= Joseph Kojo Akudibilah =

Ghanaian politician and diplomat

Amb. Joseph Kojo Akudibillah

Ambassador to Vatican
- In office July 2017 – July 2021
- President: Nana Akuffo-Addo
- Succeeded by: Past

Personal details
- Born: January 1948 (age 78) Ghana
- Party: Independent Candidate
- Children: four

Joseph Kojo Akudibillah (born January 1948) is a Ghanaian diplomat and an independent candidate. He is currently Ghana's ambassador to the Vatican.

== Ambassadorial appointment ==
In July 2017, President Nana Akuffo-Addo named Joseph Kojo Akudibillah as Ghana's ambassador to Vatican. He was among twenty two other distinguished Ghanaians who were named to head various diplomatic Ghanaian mission in the world.

== Early life ==
Akudibilla was a parishioner of the St Anthony's Catholic Church at Daduuri in the Bawku Municipality of the Catholic Diocese of Navrongo-Bolgatanga prior to his appointment as Ambassador to the Vatican in 2017. He holds an academic diploma in nursing sciences.

== Personal life ==
Mrs Margaret Adunadaga Minyila is the spouse of Joseph Akudibillah with which he has four children.

== Politics ==
He was also the MP for the then Garu-Tempane Constituency from 2000 to 2004. In the year 2000, he won the general elections as the member of parliament for the Garu-Tempane constituency of the Upper East Region of Ghana. He won as an independent candidate in that election for the Upper East Region. Akudibillah was elected with 14,282 valid votes cast. This was equivalent to 45.40% of the total valid votes cast. He was elected over Dominic Azumah Azimbe of the National Democratic Congress, William Pullam of the Peoples National Convention Party, Emmanuel S.N.Asigri of the New Patriotic Party, Tindogo D.Ashock of the Convention Peoples Party, Halid M.Yussif of the United Ghana Movement and Hamidu Sahanona of the National Reform Party. These acquired 12,224, 2,908, 1,360, 293, 246,138 votes out of the total valid votes cast respectively. These were equivalent to 38.90%, 9.20%, 4.30%,0.90%, 0.80%, 0.40% respectively of total valid votes cast.
