= Kweku Asomah-Cheremeh =

Ghanaian politician

The Honourable Kweku Asomah-Cheremeh
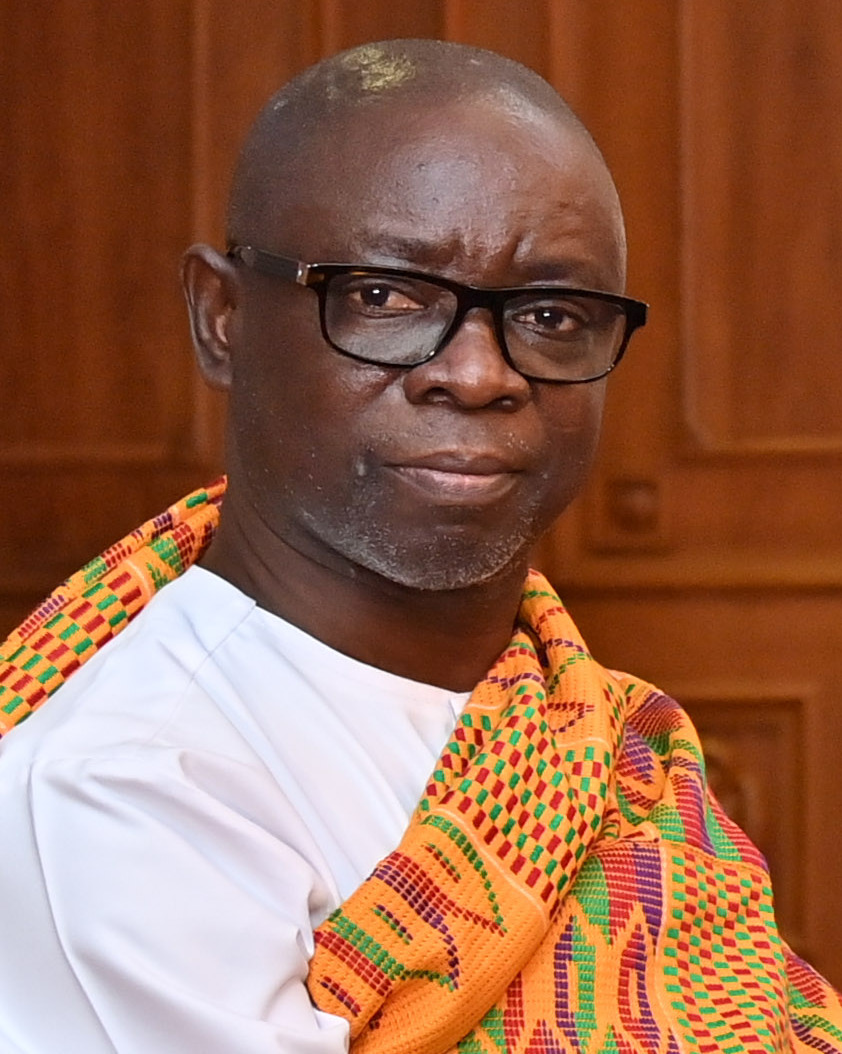

Minister for Lands and Natural Resources
- In office June 2018 – 2020
- President: Nana Akuffo-Addo
- Preceded by: John Peter Amewu
- Succeeded by: Samuel Abu Jinapor

Personal details
- Born: Ghana
- Party: New Patriotic Party

Kweku Asomah-Cheremeh is a Ghanaian politician and a member of the New Patriotic Party in Ghana. He is the former Brong Ahafo Regional minister of Ghana. He was appointed by President Nana Addo Danquah Akuffo-Addo in January 2017 and was approved by the Members of Parliament in February 2017. He is currently Lands and Natural Resources minister Of Ghana.
