= George Ayisi-Boateng =

Ghanaian diplomat

Amb. George Ayisi-Boateng PhD

Ambassador to South Africa
- Incumbent
- Assumed office July 2017
- President: Nana Akuffo-Addo

Personal details
- Born: Ghana
- Party: New Patriotic Party
- Education: Kwame Nkrumah University of Science and Technology, MBA. University of Witwatersrand, PhD

George Ayisi-Boateng is a Ghanaian diplomat and a member of the New Patriotic Party of Ghana. He is currently Ghana's ambassador to South Africa.

== Ambassadorial appointment ==
In July 2017, President Nana Akuffo-Addo named George Ayisi-Boateng as Ghana's ambassador to South Africa. He was among twenty two other distinguished Ghanaians who were named to head various diplomatic Ghanaian mission in the world.
