= Kwamena Duncan =

Ghanaian educationist and politician

The Honourable Kwamena Duncan

Regional Minister of Central region (Ghana)
- In office February 2017 – January 2021
- President: Nana Akuffo-Addo

Personal details
- Born: Ghana
- Party: New Patriotic Party
- Education: Mfantsipim School
- Profession: Educationist

Kwamena Duncan is a Ghanaian educationist and politician. He is a member of the New Patriotic Party in Ghana. He was the Central Regional minister of Ghana. He was appointed by President Nana Addo Danquah Akuffo-Addo in January 2017 and was approved by the Members of Parliament in February 2017. He is also former Central Regional Secretary of the New Patriotic Party
