= One district, one factory =

Ghanaian government policy

One District One Factory also known as 1D1F is a Government of Ghana policy. It is aimed at creating jobs for Ghanaians through the setting up of factories and industries which will in turn move the country towards greater industrialization. The policy was first introduced to Ghanaians in 2016 as part of manifesto of the New Patriotic Party of Ghana. The programme received a boost on January 13, 2018, with the commissioning of Twyford Ceramics factory by President Nana Akufo-Addo at Shama District in the Western region. The ceramics factory which is into the production and distribution of tiles is estimated at the cost of $77.26 million and will operate at a designed production capacity of 14.4 million square meters per year with annual sales projected to be $82.8 million.

== Factories ==
=== Ekumfi Fruits & Juices Limited ===
The industry specializes in the manufacturing of locally made fruit, mainly pineapple, juices from the Ekumfi Abor district in the Central Region of Ghana. It forms part of the One District, One Factory (1D1F) initiative.

The factory has created about 5000 direct jobs in an attempt to alleviate poverty within the community and its neighboring districts and regions. The facility is known to be the biggest processing factory for fruits in West Africa, producing approximately 10 tons of fruits per hour.
