= Naa Bolinaa Saaka =

Ghanaian diplomat

Amb. Naa Bolinaa Saaka

Ambassador to Burkina Faso
- Incumbent
- Assumed office July 2017
- President: Nana Akuffo-Addo

Personal details
- Born: Ghana
- Party: New Patriotic Party

Naa Bolinaa Saaka is a Ghanaian diplomat and a member of the New Patriotic Party of Ghana. He is currently Ghana's ambassador to Burkina Faso.

== Ambassadorial appointment ==
In July 2017, President Nana Akuffo-Addo named Naa Bolinaa Saaka as Ghana's ambassador to Burkina Faso. He was among twenty two other distinguished Ghanaians who were named to head various diplomatic Ghanaian mission in the world.
