= Napoleon Abdulai =

Ghanaian diplomat

Amb. Napoleon Abdulai

Ambassador to Cuba
- Incumbent
- Assumed office July 2017
- President: Nana Akuffo-Addo

Personal details
- Born: Ghana
- Party: New Patriotic Party

Napoleon Abdulai is a Ghanaian diplomat and a member of the New Patriotic Party of Ghana who has served as Ghana's ambassador to Mali since 2021.

== Ambassadorial appointment ==
In July 2017, President Nana Akuffo-Addo named Napoleon Abdulai as Ghana's ambassador to Cuba, among 22 other Ghanaians appointed to head diplomatic Ghanaian missions around the world. In 2021, Abdulai was appointed as Ghana's ambassador to Mali.
