= Esther Dzifa Ofori =

Ghanaian diplomat

Amb. Esther Dzifa Ofori

Ambassador to Equatorial Guinea
- Incumbent
- Assumed office July 2017
- President: Nana Akuffo-Addo

Personal details
- Born: Vakpo Boxome, Volta, Ghana
- Party: New Patriotic Party

Esther Dzifa Ofori is a Ghanaian diplomat and a member of the New Patriotic Party of Ghana. She is currently Ghana's ambassador to Republic of Equatorial Guinea.

== Ambassadorial appointment ==
In July 2017, President Nana Akuffo-Addo named Esther Ofori as Ghana's ambassador to Republic of Equatorial Guinea. She was among twenty two other distinguished Ghanaians who were named to head various diplomatic Ghanaian missions in the world.

== Advocating for women ==
During the Female Pillars of Modern Ghana Conference & Awards which held in Accra, Esther Ofori advocate for Ghanaian women in order to removed all the challenges they are facing so that they can also contribute significantly to Ghana economy.

During the launch of ‘Female President Project which was organized by West Africa International Press Limited in Accra, she informed the women why they should help one another in order to overcome the challenges that they are facing especially leadership. She also urge Ghanaians to elect female president in the 2024 Ghanaian general election as she believed that Ghana economy can be unlock by a women.
