= Stephen Yakubu =

Ghanaian politician

Personal details
- Born: 25 May 1966 (age 60) Gotisaliga-Binduri
- Party: New Patriotic Party
- Children: 2
- Education: Kwame Nkrumah University of Science and Technology; Thames Valley University
- Occupation: Politician
- Profession: Architect

Stephen Mahamudu Yakubu is a Ghanaian politician and diplomat who is a member of the New Patriotic Party of Ghana. He was Ghana's ambassador to the Kingdom of Morocco.

== Biography ==
Stephen Mahamudu Yakubu was born on May 25, 1966 at Gotisaliga-Binduri, a farming community in the Upper East Region. He obtained a BSc in Planning from Kwame Nkrumah University of Science and Technology (KNUST) and a Postgraduate diploma in Information Systems from Thames Valley University in the UK.

During the 2008 general election, Mr. Yakubu contested the Binduri seat which had always been enjoyed by the National Democratic Congress, under the ticket of the New Patriotic Party. He won the seat with 50.43% of the vote. He was sworn-in as a Member of Parliament on the 7th of January 2009 and held office until January 2013. He has not been elected since but, leading up to the 2016 election, he was the member of a team which helped to bring into the party 18 settler communities.

In July 2017, President Nana Akuffo-Addo named Yakubu as Ghana's ambassador to the Kingdom of Morocco. He was among twenty two other distinguished Ghanaians who were named to head various diplomatic Ghanaian mission in the world. Yakubu served as Ghana’s Ambassador to Morocco from 2017 to 2021. In 2021, Yakubu was named Upper East Regional Minister; as of 2025, he was Upper West Regional Minister.
