= Kissi Agyebeng =

Ghanaian lawyer and academic, Special Prosecutor since 2021

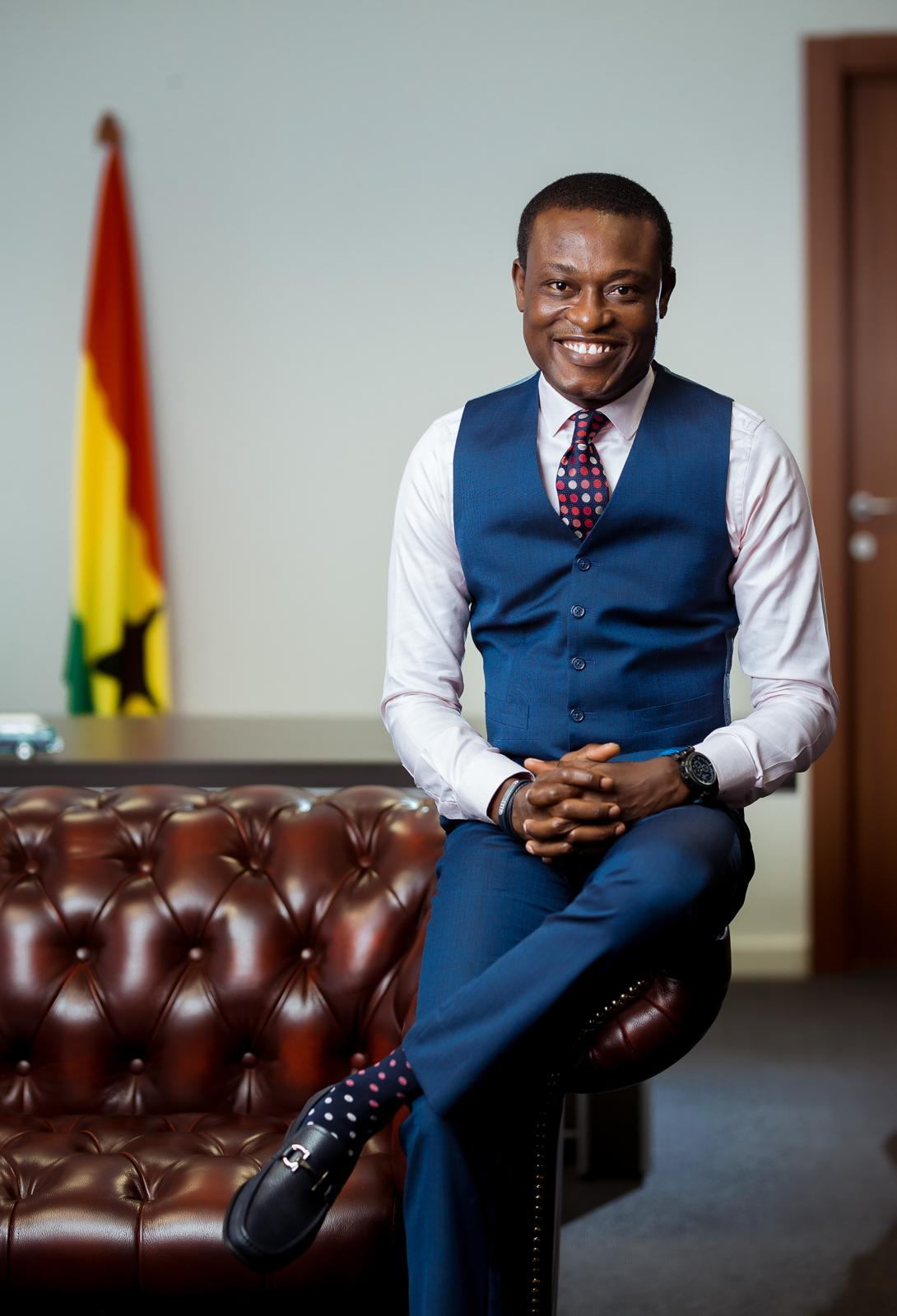

Special Prosecutor
- Incumbent
- Assumed office 5 August 2021
- President: John Dramani Mahama
- Deputy: Cynthia Lamptey
- Preceded by: Martin Amidu

Personal details
- Born: William Kissi Agyebeng; 2 July 1978 (age 48) Ghana
- Education: Accra Academy
- Alma mater: University of Ghana; Ghana School of Law; Schulich School of Law; Cornell Law School
- Occupation: Lawyer and Academic

Kissi Agyebeng (born 2 July 1978) is a Ghanaian lawyer, academic, and the Special Prosecutor of Ghana since 2021. Prior to his appointment, he was a lecturer at the University of Ghana, Managing Partner at Cromwell Gray LLP, and the Chairman of the Electronic Communications Tribunal of Ghana.

== Early life and education (1978–2006) ==
Agyebeng was born on 2 July 1978 and hails from Kwahu Nkwatia, in the Eastern Region. He attended the Accra Academy where he obtained his Ordinary Level (O-Level) certificate in 1994 and his Advanced Level (A-Level) certificate in 1996.

Following his secondary education, he gained admission to study law at the University of Ghana, where he graduated in 2001 as the best-graduating student of his batch, winning the Bentsi-Enchill Award for Best Graduating Law Student. Agyebeng continued at the Ghana School of Law in 2001, and graduated in 2003 with the E.N. Sowah Memorial Award for Best Student in Family Law.

That same year, he was called to the Ghana Bar.

In 2004 he enrolled at the Schulich School of Law, Dalhousie University, where he studied Marine and Environmental Law, graduating in 2005.

Following his postgraduate studies at Dallhousie, he entered Cornell Law School, Cornell University, for another master's degree program in Corporate Law and Securities Regulation. At Cornell, he was the editor of the Cornell LL.M. Newsletter.

== Early Career (2006–2021) ==
=== Academia ===
Following his postgraduate studies abroad, Agyebeng returned to Ghana, where he gained employment as a lecturer at the University of Ghana in 2006. In 2009, he doubled as the International Humanitarian Law lecturer at the Regional Maritime University in Nungua, Accra. In 2011, he joined the Ghana Armed Forces Staff College and, a year later, taught Criminal Law at Mountcrest University College. In 2013 and 2014, he taught Criminal Law at Central University College, and the Ghana Institute of Management and Public Administration (GIMPA) respectively. He remained a lecturer at the University of Ghana until his appointment as the Special Prosecutor in 2021. He taught Criminal Law and International Humanitarian Law at the University of Ghana School of Law for fifteen years.

=== Legal practice ===
Agyebeng begun as an associate at Zoe, Akyea, and Co. Law firm. He joined the Center for Public Interest Law (CEPIL), a Human Rights/Public Interest Law Firm in Accra in 2008, and, a year later, gained employment at the Accra-based Ayine and Felli Law Firm as a Senior Associate.

Prior to his appointment to the office of the Special Prosecutor, he was a Managing Partner of Cromwell Gray LLP, and the chairman of the Electronic Communications Tribunal of Ghana; a tribunal responsible for the adjudication of appeals from verdicts of the National Communications Authority (NCA) and the Dispute Resolution Committee of the NCA, with regards to the use of electronic communications, how broadcasting is regulated and the utilisation of the electro-magnetic spectrum, in addition to other related issues. He was made chairman of the tribunal on July 1, 2019, succeeding Samuel Date-Bah, formerly Justice of the Supreme Court of Ghana.

He was the founding Managing Partner of Cromwell Gray LLP, a law firm operating from Ghana. He has been the legal counsel for the famous Ghanaian investigative journalist Anas Aremeyaw Anas and Ghana Blackstar player Asamoah Gyan. Agyebeng has been a legal representative of state institutions such as the Volta River Authority, Ghana National Petroleum Corporation, National Lottery Authority, Youth Employment Authority, and Ghana Trade Fair Company.

== Special Prosecutor (2021–present) ==
=== Nomination and Appointment as Special Prosecutor ===
Agyebeng was nominated on 26 April 2021 by the Attorney General, Godfred Yeboah Dame, to replace Martin Amidu, the former Special Prosecutor who resigned on 16 November 2020. The nomination was with accordance to section 13(8) of the Special Prosecutor Act 2017 (Act 959) that states that; "When the position of the Special Prosecutor becomes vacant, the president shall, within six months, appoint another qualified person for that portfolio". In a letter to the office of the president, the Attorney General stated: "Kissi Agyebeng possesses the requisite expertise on corruption and corruption-related matters, is of high moral character and proven integrity and satisfies all the other requirements stipulated in section 13(1) and (2) of Act 959." The nomination was then approved by the president and forwarded to parliament. He was vetted by the Appointments Committee of parliament on Thursday 22 July 2021, and unanimously recommended. He was subsequently approved unanimously by parliament on Friday 30 July 2021. As stated by the first deputy speaker of parliament, Joseph Osei Owusu; "The motion is adopted, and Kissi Agyebeng has been confirmed as a nominee for the position of Special Prosecutor". Agyebeng was sworn into office by the president of Ghana, Nana Akufo-Addo on Thursday, 5 August 2021. According to the president, "He has the capacity, the experience, the requisite values and intellectual strength to succeed in this vital position."

== Major Investigations and Prosecutions Led by the Special Prosecutor ==
Since assuming office, the Special Prosecutor has spearheaded a number of high-profile investigations and prosecutions that have redefined the contours of Ghana's anti-corruption architecture. His tenure has been marked by bold prosecutions, probes, and an uncompromising stance on political and administrative accountability.

=== Landmark Prosecutions ===
==== THE NPA UPPF- Scandal ====
In one of the Office's largest prosecutions to date, seven individuals and three companies were charged over a GHS 280 million extortion and money laundering scheme involving the National Petroleum Authority.

Key accused persons include former NPA CEO Mustapha Abdul-Hamid and UPPF Coordinator Jacob Kwamina Amuah, with allegations of illicit fund extraction from petroleum firms and laundering through companies such as Kel Logistics Ltd.

The trial, which is ongoing, reflects a renewed focus on economic crimes involving regulatory institutions.

==== Northern Development Authority & A&QS Consortium. ====
The Office investigated reports of procurement and financial malfeasance at the NDA. This resulted in the prosecution of four individuals, including former senior officials of the Authority. The trial remains active and has been pivotal in addressing regional development corruption.

Public Procurement Authority – Adjenim Boateng Adjei Former CEO of the PPA, Adjenim Boateng Adjei, has been charged with multiple counts of corruption and procurement fraud following an extensive investigation triggered by the "Contracts for Sale" exposé. The prosecution seeks to establish a precedent in procurement integrity. Trial is ongoing.

==== Payroll Fraud Crackdown ====
The Office of the Special Prosecutor (OSP), in collaboration with the Controller and Accountant‑General's Department (CAGD), conducted an audit of the Government payroll administration in the Northern Region, uncovering widespread fraud involving so-called "ghost names." The investigation found that unearned salaries amounting to GHC 2,854,144.80 were being paid to individuals who were deceased, retired, missing, or had vacated their postings.

By suspending these illegal payments and removing the fraudulent entries from the system, the Ghanaian government saved GHC 34,249,737.60 in payroll expenses for the 2024 financial year, with similar savings expected in subsequent years. The OSP prosecuted six individuals in the High Court in Tamale, including school administrators and payroll officers. Each entered guilty pleas under the OSP's plea‑bargaining framework and fully restituted the State. Over GHC 106,319.64 was recovered covering GHC 86,000 in direct losses and additional amounts in restitution.

The cases highlight an ongoing commitment to confronting public-sector payroll fraud across regions.

==== Juaben Municipal Assembly Bribery – Sarfo Kantanka ====
The Special Prosecutor initiated proceedings against Alexander Sarfo-Kantanka, a former nominee for Municipal Chief Executive of Juaben. Following revelations of vote-buying attempts during his confirmation, he was charged with corruption.

=== Notable Investigations ===
==== Ken Ofori-Atta. ====
The Office of the Special Prosecutor (OSP) has initiated multiple corruption-related investigations into former Finance Minister Kenneth Ofori-Atta, focusing on alleged financial misconduct during his tenure. The investigations cover five key areas: revenue assurance contracts between Strategic Mobilisation Ghana Ltd and the Ghana Revenue Authority, the termination of the ECG-BXC agreement, payments associated with the National Cathedral project, the procurement of ambulances through the Ministry of Health, and the disbursement of funds from the GRA Tax Refund Account.

In February 2025, the OSP declared Mr Ofori-Atta a fugitive from justice after he failed to comply with a lawful summons to appear for questioning. His legal team had responded that he was undergoing indefinite medical treatment abroad. Although his lawyers later assured the OSP of his cooperation with a definite date to return to Ghana, he failed to meet a subsequent deadline in June 2025, leading to the reinstatement of his fugitive status.

Consequently, the OSP caused an Interpol Red Notice to be issued to enable international enforcement of its warrant. In addition, the Office has initiated formal extradition proceedings through the Attorney-General, requesting the Government of the United States to surrender Mr Ofori-Atta to Ghana to facilitate the ongoing investigations.

==== Airbus SE Scandal ====
A lengthy investigation (7 years) into Ghana's role in the global Airbus bribery case concluded with no prosecutable evidence against former President John Mahama or other key individuals. The Office closed the file but signalled openness to revisiting it should new evidence emerge.

==== Cecilia Dapaah (former minister for Sanitation) ====
In 2023, the Office of the Special Prosecutor (OSP) investigated then-Sanitation Minister Cecilia Dapaah after large sums of cash were reportedly stolen from her home. During the probe, the OSP uncovered an additional US$590,000 and GHS 2.73 million in cash concealed in her residence, which were seized, and subsequently froze her bank accounts.

After months of investigation, including collaboration with the FBI, the OSP concluded that there was sufficient evidence and predicate offences to support a money laundering case. As money laundering falls under the mandate of the Economic and Organised Crime Office (EOCO), the OSP referred the full docket and evidence to EOCO in January 2024.

EOCO, under the Akufo-Addo administration, declined to proceed, reportedly following a directive from the Attorney-General. In 2025, under a new administration, EOCO reopened the case and is currently investigating.

==== Labianca Company & Ghana Revenue Authority ====
The OSP investigated allegations of preferential tax treatment involving Labianca Company and the Customs Division of the GRA. The probe revealed that Labianca received arbitrary tax reductions, facilitated by top Customs officials, in breach of customs valuation rules. The company's owner allegedly exploited her role as a Council of State and GRA Board member—a textbook case of influence peddling.

As a result, Labianca was ordered to pay over GHS 1 million in unpaid duties. The investigation triggered wider reforms, including the repeal of benchmark value discounts, streamlined auction processes, and the introduction of GRA anti-corruption manuals. Two senior Customs officers, including Deputy Commissioner Joseph Adu Kyei, were cited for misconduct and subsequently reassigned. The implicated Commissioner of Customs, Col. (Rtd.) Kwadwo Damoah, was later relieved of his duties, with the Presidency citing an expired contract.

==== Parliamentary Bribery Probe ====
The Office completed a sensitive investigation into alleged attempts by a businessman to bribe Members of Parliament. The report underscored institutional vulnerabilities but did not result in charges.

==== Galamsey Economy Documentary ====
In the aftermath of the exposé implicating Charles Adu Boahen, a former Deputy Finance Minister, the Office determined that his actions amounted to influence peddling, a conduct not currently criminalised under Ghanaian law. While the investigation was closed, the OSP noted it could be reopened should legal reforms or new evidence arise.

==== Sir John’s Estate ====
The OSP investigated the alleged unlawful acquisition of protected state lands by the late Kwadwo Owusu-Afriyie, former Chief Executive of the Forestry Commission and General Secretary of the New Patriotic Party. The OSP sought to freeze the assets in question; however, the court dismissed the application, ruling that the OSP lacks the legal authority to pursue the assets of a deceased person.

The OSP has strongly disagreed with the ruling and has since filed an appeal to challenge the court's interpretation of its powers under the law.

==== National Cathedral Project ====
Probe launched into procurement and financial transactions.

== Thought Leadership and Public Engagements ==
The Special Prosecutor has emerged as a leading voice on anti-corruption reform, both locally and internationally. His keynote addresses and public interventions have included:

- World Anti-Corruption Day (2021) – A major address on recalibrating Ghana's anti-corruption fight.
- ICC FraudNet Conference (2023) – Spoke on state capture and international financial crimes
- GII Roundtable (2024) – Analysed Ghana's CPI ranking and shared future anti-graft strategies.
- One Ghana Movement Constitution Day Lecture (2025) – Advocated constitutional and behavioural reform to tackle systemic corruption.
- National Anti-Corruption Conference (2025) – Articulated disruptive approaches to make corruption a high-risk enterprise.

In addition, the Office under his leadership has consistently published biannual statutory reports since 2022, ensuring transparency in its operations and public accountability in Ghana’s anti-corruption process.

== Strategic Actions & Reforms ==
- US Anti-Corruption Collaboration

The Office hosted U.S. Assistant Secretary Todd D. Robinson to strengthen global cooperation against corruption and transnational financial crimes

- Government Payroll Cleanup

Joint operation with the Controller & Accountant General to remove ghost names from payroll and recover funds.

- Election Integrity Initiative

Ahead of upcoming national elections, the OSP launched a proactive initiative aimed at detecting and deterring electoral fraud and vote-buying, reinforcing the sanctity of Ghana's democratic process.

== Selected publications ==
- Theory in Search of Practice – The Right of Innocent Passage in the Territorial Sea, Cornell International Law Journal, (2006) p 371.
- The Prophecies of the Prophetic Jurist – A Review of Selected Works of Oliver Wendell Holmes, Jr. (2005). Cornell Law School LL.M. Papers Series. Paper10.
- Disappearing Acts – Toward a Global Civil Liability Regime for Pollution Damage Resulting from Offshore Oil and Gas Exploration (2006). Cornell Law School LL.M. Papers Series. Paper 11
- Minority Rights in Corporate Governance in Ghana: The End of the Rule in Foss v. Harbottle?, in Ghana Law Since Independence: History, Development and Prospects, Mensa-Bonsu et al. eds, 73 (Black Mask Ltd, 2007)
- To Disclose or Not to Disclose the Offence – That is the Question: The Case of Allan William Hodgson (2008–2010) 24 University of Ghana Law Journal 87
- A Commitment to Law, Development & Public Policy – A Festschrift in Honour of Nana Dr. SKB Asante (Wildy, Simmonds & Hill Publishing, London, 2016) – co-editor with Richard Frimpong Oppong
- Conflict of Laws in Ghana (Sedco Publishing, Accra, upcoming February 2021) – co-author with Richard Frimpong Oppong
- A Few Good Men: Suppressing and Repressing Corruption and State Capture in Aid of Development.

== Personal life ==
Kissi Agyebeng is a Christian and married.

== See also ==
- Office of the Special Prosecutor
