= Border Guard Unit =

Border security branch of Ghana's military

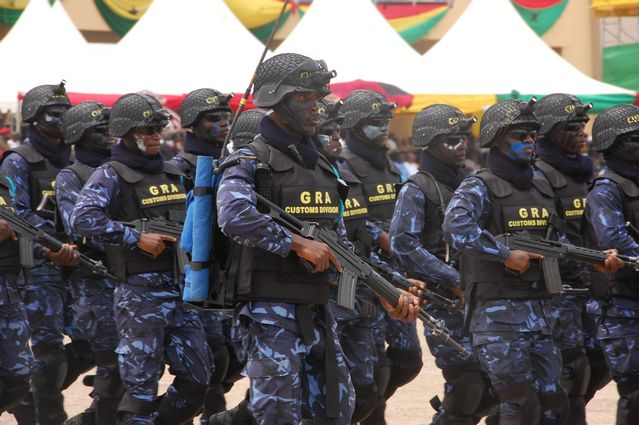
- Border Guard Unit (BGU) Special Forces Special Agent of the Customs Excise and Preventive Service (CEPS) Division of the Ghana Revenue Authority (GRA)
- Abbreviation: BGU
- Established: October 1964
- Legal status: Active
- Region served: Ghana
- Key people: Sergeant Major and Chief Warrant Officer Dickson Owusu; GAF (Director-general of the BGU)
- Affiliations: Customs Excise and Preventive Service (CEPS); Ghana Revenue Authority (GRA); Bureau of National Investigations; Ghana Armed Forces; Ministry of Defence (Ghana); Ghana Immigration Service
- Budget: $1-2 billion (estimate)

The Border Guard Unit (acronym: BGU) is a national security and paramilitary unit of the Customs Excise and Preventive Service Division of the Ghana Revenue Authority and the Ghana Armed Forces (GAF). Established in October 1964, BGU's primary role is to guard Ghana's international borders during peacetime and prevent trans-border crime.

== History ==
In October 1964, the Border Guard Unit was formed as a police unit led by an assistant commissioner of police. The BGU acted as customs agents examining passengers and baggage aboard ships and aircraft.

In 1988 the BGU was re-integrated into the Customs Excise and Preventive Service as a military unit. BGU designs and implements effective strategies and programmes to facilitate the movement of people across Ghana's international borders.

== Objectives ==
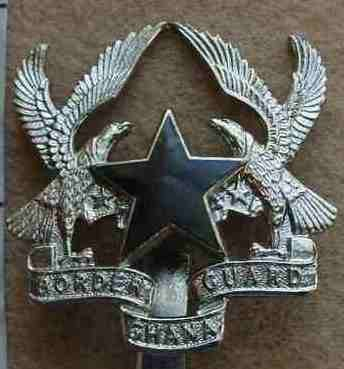
BGU (Border Guard Unit) Special Agent Badge.

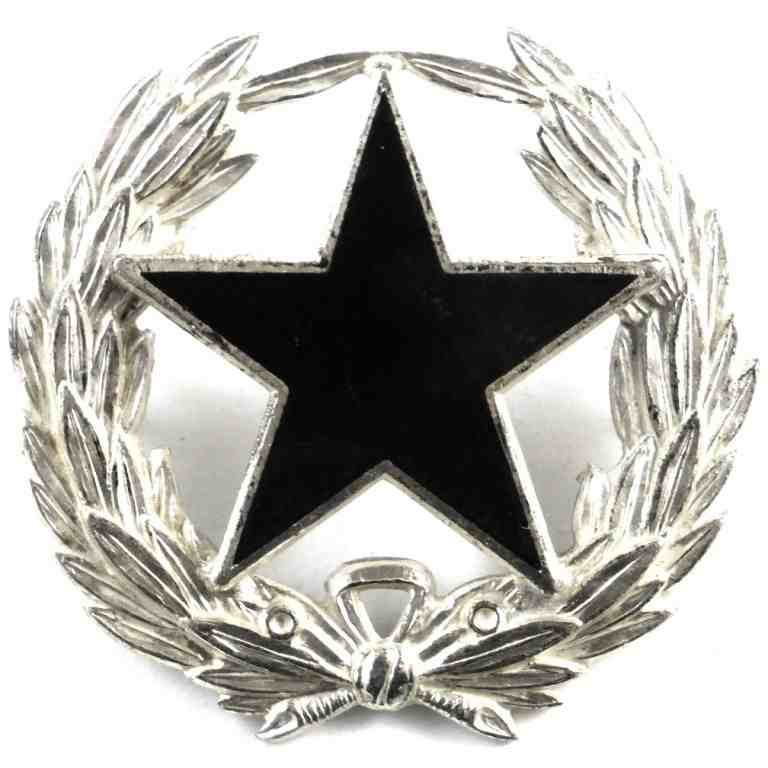
Border Guard Unit Shield

The Border Guard Unit (BGU) ensures the security of Ghana's international borders and entry and exit points against illegal immigration and cross-border criminals. Its tasks include:

- Physical patrolling of international borders
- Preventing illegal emigration
- Preventing drug trafficking and human trafficking
- Preventing cross-border smuggling
- Preventing wildlife smuggling
- Reporting on suspected subversive activities
- Preparedness to act as the first line of defence against external aggressors

=== Border patrol operations and corporate operations ===
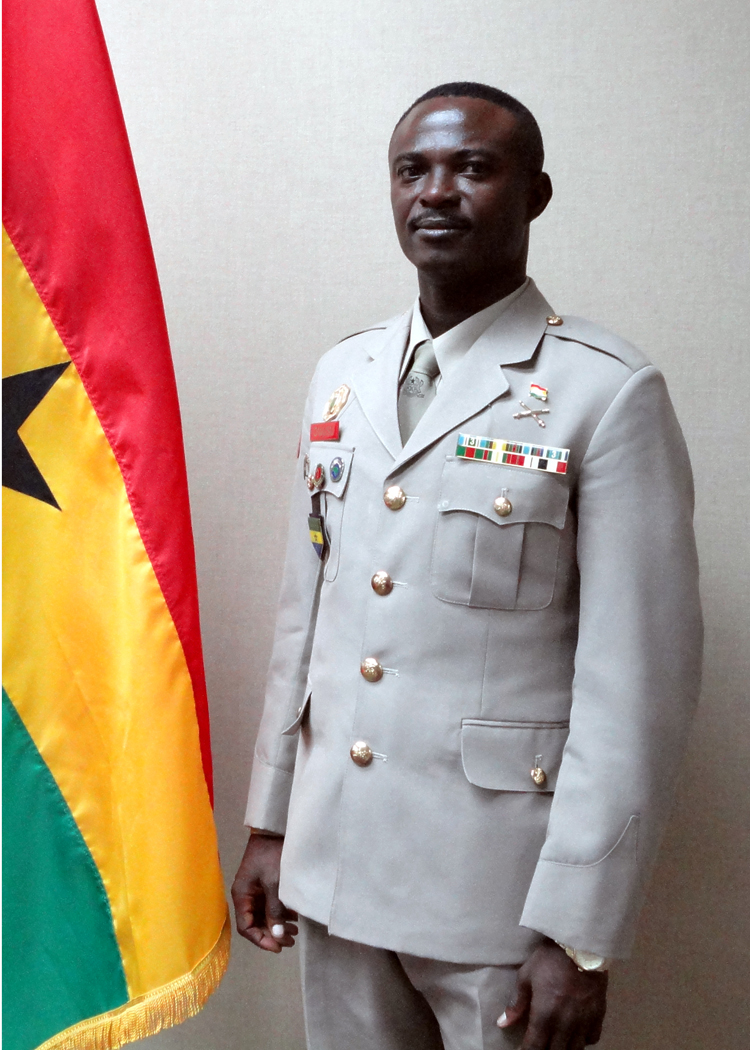
Sergeant Major and Chief Warrant Officer Dickson Owusu; the current Director-general of the BGU (Border Guard Unit)

The BGU's primary operation is detection and apprehension of illegal aliens and smugglers of aliens at or near the land borders. Some of the major BGU operational activities include maintaining traffic checkpoints and security checkpoints along highways (Ghana Road Network) leading from border areas, conducting snap checks and anti-smuggling within Ghana. These BGU operational activities are performed with the use of UCAVs, UAVs, attack helicopters, armoured fighting vehicles, pick-up vehicles, and all purpose motorbikes .

=== Customs operations ===
The BGU physically examines containerized goods at Boankra Inland Port, Akosombo Port, Takoradi Harbour and Tema Harbour. BGU is working to streamline and fully automate customs processes and procedures under the Ghana Customs Management System (GCMS) and the Ghana Community Network (GCNET).
