= Samuel Appiah Darko =

Ghanaian lawyer and anti- corruption advocate

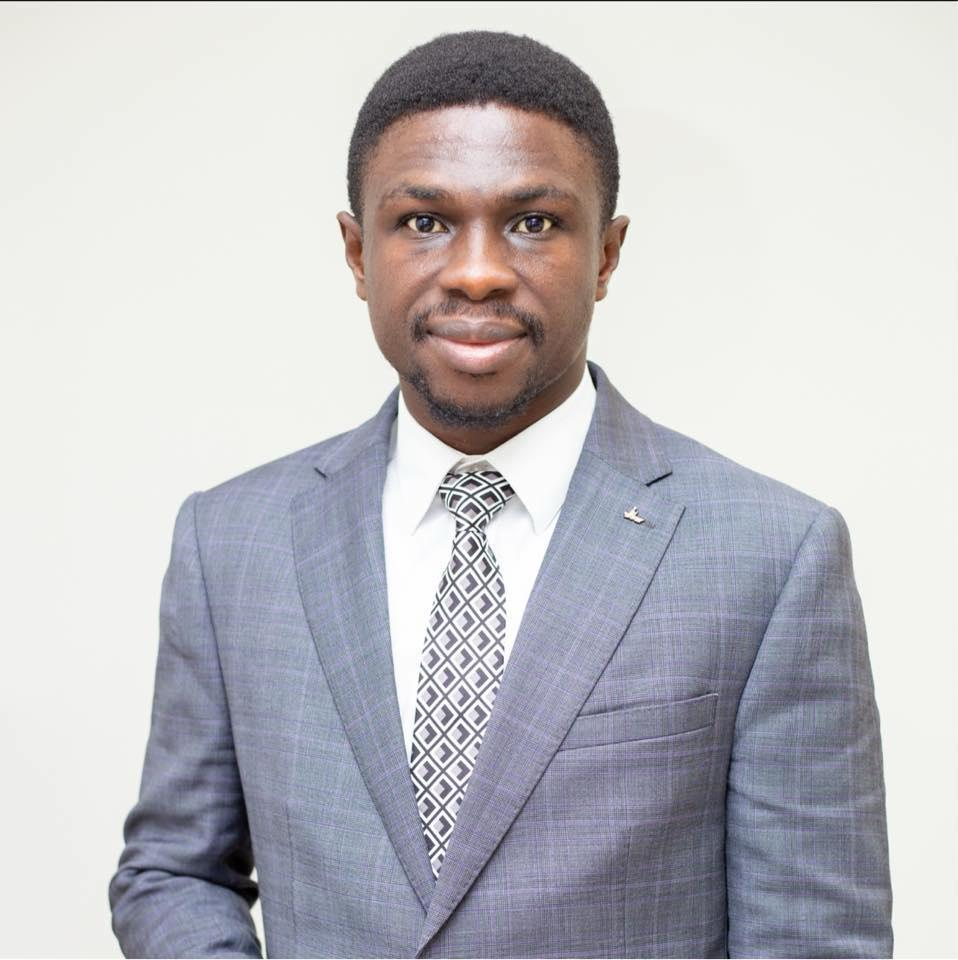

Director Strategy, Research & Communication
- Incumbent
- Assumed office 3 May 2022

Personal details
- Education: Ghana Institute of Management and Public Administration; Ghana School of Law
- Occupation: Lawyer, Journalist, Academic and Anti-corruption advocate

Samuel Appiah Darko (commonly known as Sammy Darko) is a Ghanaian lawyer and journalist, recognised for his work in academia, intelligence analysis, and anti-corruption advocacy. He has served as the Director of the Strategy, Research, and Communication Division at the Office of the Special Prosecutor in Ghana since 3 May 2022.

== Education ==
Samuel Appiah Darko holds multiple degrees and certifications:

- · M.A. in Gender, Peace, and Security Studies from the Kofi Annan Peacekeeping Training Centre, Accra.
- · LL.B. from the Ghana Institute of Management and Public Administration (GIMPA).
- · B.A. in Communication Studies (First Class Honours) awarded by the University of Ghana.
- · Additionally, he obtained professional certifications in Public Corruption Turnarounds from the Blavatnik School of Government at the University of Oxford and Multimedia Broadcasting from the BBC Academy, College of Journalism, in London.
- He completed his professional legal training at the Ghana School of Law and was called to the Ghana Bar in 2017.

== Career ==
He worked as a correspondent for the BBC World Service in Accra for five years, covering political, economic, and social affairs across Ghana and West Africa. His work involved live reporting, investigative journalism, news writing, and producing in-depth analyses for global audiences. He also conducted several interviews, moderated discussions, and provided expert commentary on governance, corruption, and legal matters.

Darko practiced law as a senior associate at Cromwell Gray LLP, specialising in litigation, criminal law, administrative law, media law, security law, and family law. He also worked as an intelligence officer for Africa Risk Consulting, providing critical insights into security and risk management.

== Academic career ==
Darko has made notable contributions to academia as a lecturer in media law and communications at the University of Professional Studies (UPSA) and Wisconsin International University College in Accra.

- He played a pivotal role in establishing UPSA’s master’s program in Peace, Security, and Intelligence Management (MPSI). He was a member of the committee that developed the program and served as the coordinator for the Media and Website Unit and the MPSI course.
- As a prolific writer, he has contributed to various academic and professional publications, furthering discourse in his areas of expertise.

== Memberships ==
Darko is affiliated with several professional organisations, including:

- The Ghana Bar Association
- The University Teachers Association of Ghana
- The Ghana Journalists Association

== Publications ==
- Samuel Appiah Darko. The Conversation. Ghana’s law on publication of false news, 2022.
- Control of media content in Ghana [Article] (dennislawgh.com) April 2021
- The case of blogger, social media users & copyright in Ghana
- Appiah Samuel Darko | Greg Simons (Reviewing editor) (2020) Investigative journalism in ghana: balancing public interest and individual privacy, Cogent Social Sciences
- The Under-Representation of African Women in Politics: a case study of the Ghana Parliament (2014).
- Grave Task (BBC Focus on Africa Magazine, October–December Ed. 2012)
- The Impact of News Websites on the Sale of Newspapers in Ghana: a case study of patrons of a Busy Internet café. (2008)
- Jammeh’s last hope in The Gambia [Article](www.citifmonline.com) December 2016
- The silent majority; spiral of silence in motion. (www.citifmonline.com) November 2016.
- Vigilante groups in Ghana; a necessary evil. (www.myjoyonline.com) April 2017.
- Appiah Darko, Samuel (June 26, 2024). "Of language and Copyright: Defe Defe, Pasaa, Pasaa, Doso, Doso".
- Darko, Sammy (January 10, 2022). "Police have no power to regulate prophecies in Ghana".

== See also ==
- Office of the Special Prosecutor
- Crime in Ghana
- Law enforcement in Ghana
