= Office of the Special Prosecutor =

Government prosecution office

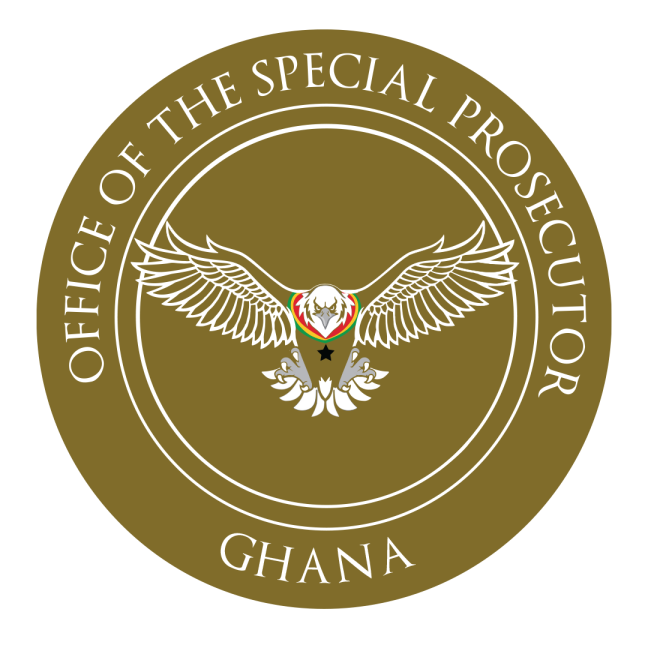
- OSP Logo

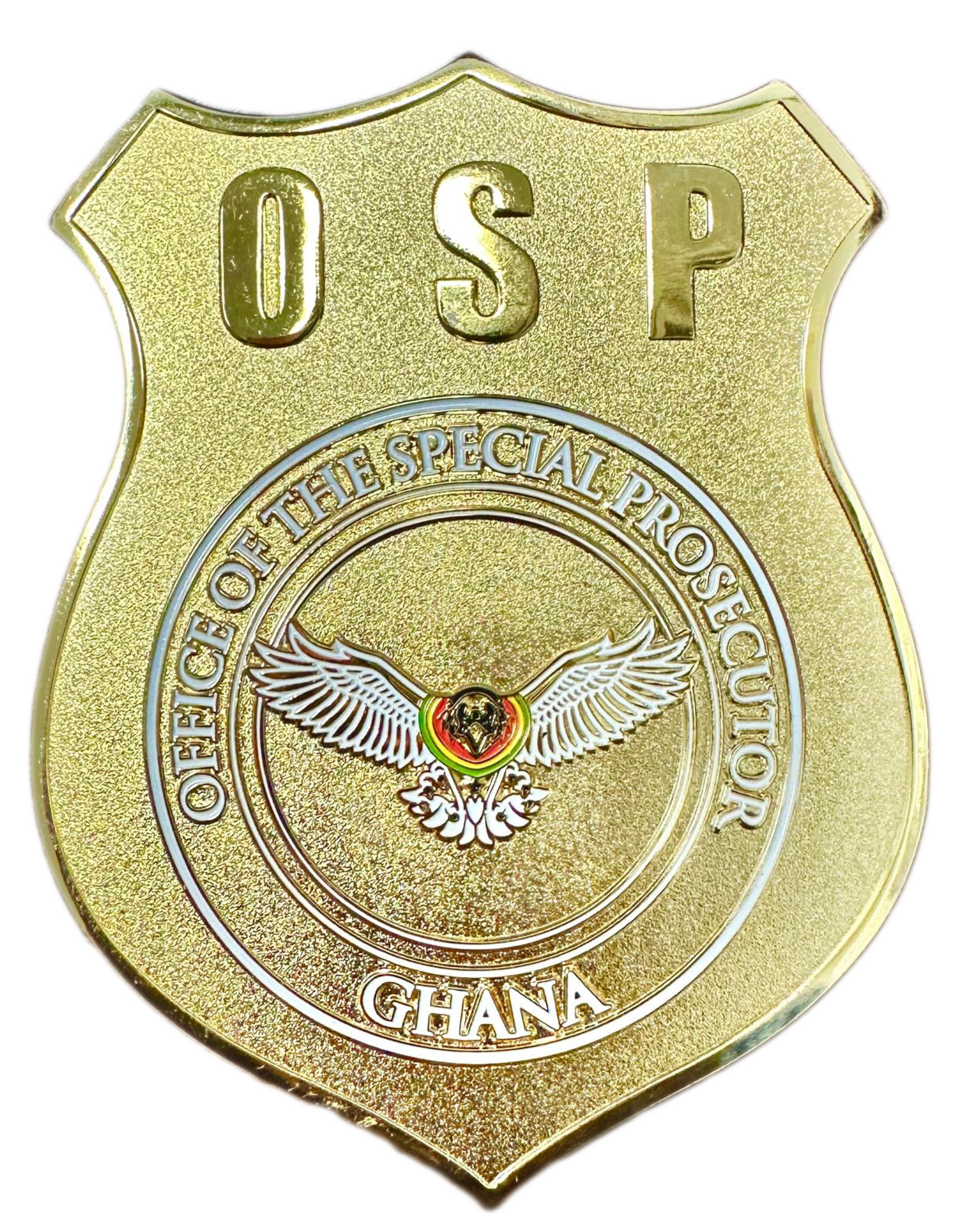
- OSP Special Agent Badge
- Abbreviation: OSP
- Motto: "Transparent, Vigilant, Fearless"

Agency overview
- Formed: 2018

Jurisdictional structure
- Federal agency: Republic of Ghana
- Operations jurisdiction: Republic of Ghana
- Constituting instruments: Constitution of Ghana, 1992; Office of the Special Prosecutor Act, 2017 (ACT 959); Office of the Special Prosecutor (Operations) Regulations, 2018 (L.I. 2374); Criminal Offences Act, 1960 (ACT 29)
- General nature: Federal law enforcement

Operational structure
- Headquarters: 6 Haile Selasie Avenue, South Ridge, Accra
- Agency executives: Kissi Agyebeng, Special Prosecutor; Cynthia Lamptey, Deputy Special Prosecutor
- DIvisions: ■ Investigations,(Mr. Albert Akurugu) ■ Prosecution,(Isodore Kwadwo Tufuor Ph.D ) ■ Assets Recovery & Management,(Mr.Albert Akurugu) ■ Strategy, Research &Communications, (Samuel Appiah Darko) ■ Operations, ■ Finance, ■ Human Resource & Administration.(Boakyewaa Glover)

Website
- https://osp.gov.gh

The Office of the Special Prosecutor (OSP) is a specialised independent anti-corruption agency established by an act of the Parliament of Ghana to investigate and prosecute acts of corruption and corruption related offences. It is also responsible for recovering proceeds of corruption and take steps to prevent it.

The OSP is the premier enforcer of Ghana's anti-corruption laws, and it is the only state agency empowered to carry out criminal prosecution of corruption and corruption related offences.

== Functions and mandate of the OSP ==
The Office of the Special Prosecutor (OSP) is an independent specialised agency responsible for performing four (4) main functions.

I. The OSP is tasked with investigating specific cases of alleged or suspected corruption or corruption-related offences involving public officers and persons who have been entrusted with prominent public functions in Ghana or a foreign country or an international organisation such as senior political party officials, government officials, judicial officials, military officials, a person who is or has been an executive in a foreign country of a state-owned company, a senior political party official in a foreign country, and an immediate family member or close associate of such a person, as well as persons in the private sector involved in the commission of such offences.

II. The OSP is mandated to prosecute offenders involved in the commission of corruption and corruption-related offences on the authority of the Attorney-General.

NB:The AG/MoJ is the principal legal adviser to the Government. It is responsible for the initiation and conduct of all prosecutions of criminal offences, with the exception that the OSP’s prosecutorial power, though derived from that of the AG/MoJ, is secured by law and it is exercised without specific reference to the AG/MoJ.

III. The OSP is empowered to recover the proceeds of corruption and corruption-related offences.

IV. The OSP is required to take steps to prevent corruption.

The multi-faceted mandate of the OSP sets it out as a public institution performing:

- Police functions
- Investigation functions
- National security and Intelligence functions
- Revenue generation functions

== Vision and mission ==
=== Objective ===
The primary objective of the Office of the Special Prosecutor is to:

- Investigate and prosecute specific instances of alleged or suspected corruption and corruption-related offences.
- Recover assets and proceeds derived from corruption.
- Implement measures to prevent corruption across both public and private sectors.

=== Vision ===
To establish a society where corruption is unwanted and opposed, fostering a culture of integrity and accountability in both public and private spheres through sustained and effective repression.

=== Mission ===
To combat corruption by:

- Conducting thorough investigations into specific cases of alleged or suspected corruption and corruption-related offences.
- Prosecuting offenders to ensure accountability and justice.
- Recovering proceeds acquired through corrupt practices to restore public trust and resources
- Implementing proactive strategies and preventive measures to curtail corruption at its roots.

== Composition and structure of the Governing body ==
Pursuant to Section 5(1), the Governing Body of the Office is constituted as follows:

- The Special Prosecutor
- The Deputy Special Prosecutor
- A representative of the Audit Service: Not below the rank of Director, nominated by the Auditor-General.
- A representative of the Ghana Police Service A representative of the Economic and Organised Crime Office (EOCO)
- A representative of the Financial Intelligence Centre (FIC)
- A representative of the Commission on Human Rights and Administrative Justice (CHRAJ)
- An individual with expertise in intelligence: Nominated by the Minister responsible for National Security.
- A female representative from Anti-Corruption Civil Society Organisations

This structure brings together experts to ensures that there is a multidisciplinary approach to governance.

=== Special Prosecutors ===
- 2021–present: Kissi Agyebeng – Special Prosecutor
- 2018–2020: Martin Amidu – former Special Prosecutor

== Legal challenges and Supreme Court ruling ==
The constitutional basis of the Office of the Special Prosecutor’s (OSP) prosecutorial mandate has been the subject of several legal challenges. In 2023, Kenneth Kwabena Agyei Kuranchie brought proceedings challenging the constitutionality of provisions of the Office of the Special Prosecutor Act, 2017 (Act 959), including the OSP's prosecutorial powers. The first action was discontinued in June 2024, while a subsequent action was struck out by the Supreme Court in July 2024 without liberty to reapply. Kuranchie subsequently sought a review of that decision, but on 11 December 2024 the Supreme Court unanimously dismissed the review application. These proceedings did not result in a substantive determination of the constitutional questions concerning the OSP’s prosecutorial mandate.

In December 2025, Noah Ephraem Tetteh Adamtey commenced a further constitutional challenge concerning sections 3 and 4 of Act 959, arguing, among other matters, that the OSP’s prosecutorial powers were inconsistent with Article 88 of the Constitution. In April 2026, the High Court in Accra held that the OSP retained investigative powers but could not independently conduct criminal prosecutions without authorisation from the Attorney-General, and ordered the Attorney-General to assume control of the OSP’s prosecutions.

In the subsequent Supreme Court proceedings, the Attorney-General supported the constitutional challenge and raised additional constitutional issues concerning the validity of provisions of Act 959 relating to the OSP’s prosecutorial powers. The Attorney-General's position was that the challenged provisions were inconsistent with the Constitution.

Fourteen Civil Society Organisations participated in the proceedings as Amici curiae in support of the constitutionality of the OSP’s statutory mandate and prosecutorial framework.

On 29 July 2026, a seven-member panel of the Supreme Court unanimously dismissed the constitutional challenge in a 7–0 decision and upheld the constitutionality of sections 3 and 4 of Act 959. The Court held that the OSP has an authorisation from the Attorney-General within the meaning of Article 88(4) of the Constitution to initiate and conduct prosecutions for corruption and corruption-related offences. The Court further held that this authorisation subsists until it is amended or revoked in the manner in which it was given.

The Court clarified that the OSP does not possess a separate or parallel constitutional source of prosecutorial authority independent of the Attorney-General. Under Article 88, constitutional responsibility for the initiation and conduct of prosecutions remains vested in the Attorney-General. At the same time, the Court distinguished that constitutional responsibility from the OSP’s statutory and operational independence in carrying out its functions under Act 959. The judgment did not require the OSP to obtain a fresh authorisation from the Attorney-General before each prosecution; the authorisation recognised by the Court continues until lawfully amended or revoked.

The Court also addressed the respective powers of the Attorney-General and the Special Prosecutor to discontinue prosecutions. It held that the Attorney-General retains the constitutional power under Article 88(3) to enter a nolle prosequi in a prosecution conducted by the OSP, but that the exercise of that power is subject to Article 296(a) and (b) of the Constitution. The Court also recognised the Special Prosecutor’s statutory power to enter a nolle prosequi under section 80 of Act 959.

The Supreme Court set aside the High Court’s decision and confirmed the validity of prosecutions and other actions undertaken by the OSP under its statutory mandate. The judgment provided substantive judicial clarification of the relationship between the OSP’s statutory and operational independence and the Attorney-General’s constitutional responsibility for prosecutions. Subsequent legal commentary described the decision as affirming the constitutionality of the OSP and its prosecutorial mandate.

== Notable cases ==
=== Agyapa Royalties Deal ===
The Office of the Special Prosecutor in Ghana conducted an analysis of the Agyapa Royalties Transactions related to the Gold Royalties Monetisation Transaction under the Minerals Income Investment Fund Act, 2018. Initiated on 10 September 2020, the action was to execute the office's mandate to prevent corruption.

The analysis revealed several critical issues:

- A significant lack of transparency and accountability throughout the approval process, with potential breaches of legal and procedural requirements in selecting transaction advisors.
- Evidence suggesting the manipulation of procurement processes by the Ministry of Finance to favour Imara Corporate Finance Limited (Pty) of South Africa, potentially constituting bid rigging.
- Opaque elements within the Mandate Agreement with Imara/Databank, which could lead to corruption-related offences, and concerns that fees payable to Databank were a decoy.
- Inadequate examination of the agreements by Parliament's Committee on Finance, possibly due to time constraints and a lack of critical analysis.
- Inconsistent application of Executive Approval, indicating deficiencies in legislative and executive action that created opportunities for corruption.
- An attempt by the Ministry of Finance to circumvent the Public Procurement Authority (PPA).

These findings indicate that the processes for approving the Agyapa Royalties Transactions were vulnerable to corruption and did not meet standards of probity, transparency, and accountability. The report highlights potential breaches of the Public Procurement Act and the Public Financial Management Act, raising concerns about lowering investor confidence. It urges improved due diligence and processes to prevent corruption in future transactions.

=== Customs Division of Ghana Revenue Authority ===
The Office of the Special Prosecutor (OSP) in Ghana investigated allegations of corruption involving Labianca Company Limited and the Customs Division of the Ghana Revenue Authority (GRA), based on a written complaint from Frank Asare. The allegations concerned corrupt dealings between Labianca and the Customs Division, focusing on unlawful markdowns on imported frozen food products disguised as customs advance rulings. It was also alleged that Eunice Jacqueline Buah Asomah-Hinneh, Labianca’s owner and Chief Executive, used her positions as a member of the Council of State and a member of the Board of Directors of Ghana Ports and Harbours Authority to engage in influence peddling, aiming to secure an undue competitive advantage in the frozen foods industry.

The OSP's investigation revealed the following:

- Labianca Company Limited, wholly owned and controlled by Ms. Asomah-Hinneh, imports approximately 200 forty-foot shipping containers of frozen foods monthly, giving it a substantial market share.
- Joseph Adu Kyei, the Deputy Commissioner for Customs, wrongfully granted customs advance rulings to Labianca, reducing import values by 5% to 10% below approved benchmark values. The OSP determined that this decision was not supported by the legal requirements for issuing customs advance rulings.
- Adu Kyei’s decision resulted in a revenue shortfall of GHC1,074,627.15 from 531 declarations.
- Adu Kyei's cited bases for his decision, including a letter from 2018 and the World Customs Organisation guidelines, did not support his actions and could not be considered a lawful basis for issuing a customs advance ruling.
- Colonel (Rtd.) Kwadwo Damoah, Commissioner for Customs, gave tacit approval to Mr. Adu Kyei’s decision.
- The OSP determined that influence peddling by Ms. Asomah-Hinneh was evident.
- The conduct of Mr. Adu Kyei and Colonel (Rtd.) Damoah indicated an institutional culture tolerating impropriety at the Customs Division of the GRA.

As a result of these findings, the OSP directed the following actions:

Labianca Company Limited was directed to pay GHC1,074,627.15, representing the revenue shortfall from the unlawful customs advance ruling, into the Asset Recovery Account of the OSP. Labianca complied with this directive on March 31, 2022.

The Commissioner-General of the GRA was directed to submit an Integrity Plan to the OSP by December 31, 2022.

A wider investigation was directed to be opened regarding the issuance of customs advance rulings and markdown of benchmark values between July 2017 and December 2021.

=== Airbus SE ===
The OSP has concluded its seven-year investigation into Airbus SE regarding the sale of military transport aircraft to Ghana between 2009 and 2015, initiated upon a referral by then-President Nana Addo Dankwa Akufo-Addo.

The investigation focused on allegations that former President John Dramani Mahama engaged his brother, Samuel Adam Foster (also known as Samuel Adam Mahama), and his associates as agents of Airbus SE in a bribery scheme to secure the aircraft purchase. The OSP found no evidence linking former President John Dramani Mahama or any public officer to bribery or the agency relationship between Airbus SE and Foster and his associates.

However, the OSP cautioned against close commercial dealings between high-ranking elected officials and their relatives, as they raise concerns of influence peddling and conflicts of interest. The Special Prosecutor, therefore, closed the investigation and will not pursue criminal proceedings against any individual in this matter.

=== Cecelia Dapaah ===
In July 2023, OSP initiated an investigation into suspected corruption involving Cecilia Abena Dapaah, former Minister for Sanitation and Water Resources, and her husband, Daniel Osei-Kufour. The investigation arose from a criminal trial involving the Minister’s domestic staff. Two house helps were charged before the Accra Circuit Court for allegedly stealing sums amounting to US$1 million, €300,000, and millions of Ghanaian cedis from the former Minister’s residence in Abelenkpe, Accra, in October 2022.

Given the substantial sums reported as stolen from a public official, the OSP commenced an inquiry into the financial affairs of the Minister. Ms Dapaah was arrested, and her residence subjected to a lawful search. The OSP discovered cash holdings amounting to US$590,000 and GHC 2,730,000 respectively. The funds were seized. Subsequently, her bank accounts were also frozen pending further investigations.

During interviews, her statements led to further inquiries into persons of interest in the United States of America. The OSP collaborated with its counterparts in the Federal Bureau of Investigation (FBI) on the matter. Following months of investigation, the case was deemed to fall outside the statutory mandate of the OSP, as the evidence increasingly indicated suspected money laundering and structuring. Consequently, the matter was referred to the Economic and Organised Crime Office (EOCO) for further action

On 24 January 2024, the OSP formally withdrew all court applications for the freezing and seizure of assets, as well as criminal proceedings for failure to declare income and property to the OSP, following the case’s referral to the Economic and Organised Crime Office (EOCO). However, EOCO later returned the docket, citing a directive from the Attorney-General, which alleging that no predicate offence had been established.

By a letter dated 14 May 2025, the new leadership of the Economic and Organised Crime Office (EOCO) formally requested the Office of the Special Prosecutor (OSP) to return the docket for purposes of review and the possible commencement of an investigation.

In response, the OSP, under the cover of correspondence dated 29 May 2025, forwarded a duplicate docket of the case to EOCO. The OSP is of the considered view that the docket will serve as a valuable reference resource to assist EOCO in investigating aspects of the case that fall outside the direct mandate of the OSP. The Office remains committed to supporting EOCO fully in its review, investigation, and any subsequent actions deemed necessary.

=== Agyenim Boateng Adjei ===
The trial of Adjenim Boateng Adjei, former Chief Executive of the Public Procurement Authority (PPA), is ongoing before the Criminal Division of the High Court in Accra. He faces eight charges, including using public office for profit and exerting direct and indirect influence over the procurement process to gain an unfair advantage in the awarding of public contracts.

Mr Adjei is alleged to have established Talent Discovery Limited (TDL) as a front to fraudulently secure public contracts. He served as CEO of the PPA from March 2017 to August 2019 before being dismissed by President Nana Addo Dankwa Akufo-Addo, following a recommendation from the Commission on Human Rights and Administrative Justice (CHRAJ). His dismissal came after he was featured in the investigative documentary Contract for Sale, which purportedly exposed procurement irregularities. CHRAJ subsequently referred the matter to the Office of the Special Prosecutor for further investigation and prosecution.

=== Ken Ofori-Atta ===
The OSP is investigating Ghana’s former Minister for Finance, Kenneth Nana Yaw Ofori-Atta. Mr Ken Ofori-Atta is required by the OSP to respond to charges in respect of several cases, including the following:

The OSP outlined five key cases under investigation:

1. Strategic Mobilisation Ghana Limited & GRA Contract – Examining contracts between Strategic Mobilisation Ghana Limited and the Ghana Revenue Authority related to revenue assurance in petroleum and mineral resources.
2. ECG and Beijing Technology Limited Contract Termination – Investigating the cancellation of a contract aimed at reducing distribution losses and improving ECG’s network.
3. National Cathedral Project – Probing procurement, payments, and other activities linked to the construction of the National Cathedral.
4. Procurement of Ambulances – Reviewing contracts awarded for the purchase and maintenance of 307 ambulances for the National Ambulance Service.
5. GRA’s Tax Refund Account Payments – Investigating the disbursement and use of funds from the Ghana Revenue Authority’s tax refund account.

Mr Ofori-Atta departed Ghana on or around 2 January 2025. On 24 January 2025, the OSP formally notified him that he was considered a suspect in respect of the aforementioned cases and directed him to appear in person before the OSP on Monday, 10 February 2025.

Through his legal representatives, Mr Ofori-Atta informed the OSP that he was out of Ghana indefinitely on medical grounds and would notify the OSP upon his return. The OSP rejected his request to remain outside the jurisdiction indefinitely on medical grounds based solely on his assertion and reiterated the directive for him to appear in person on Monday, 10 February 2025. The OSP warned Mr Ofori-Atta that failure to comply would result in steps being taken to secure his return.

Subsequently, Mr Ofori-Atta transmitted to the OSP a generic letter, purportedly from a doctor in a foreign jurisdiction, stating that he had been examined, was undergoing further tests and management, and might require surgical intervention at a later date. Unconvinced that the purported medical letter constituted an official medical report confirming that he was incapacitated or physically unable to return to Ghana without endangering his life, the OSP declared him wanted and a fugitive from justice based on an arrest warrant.

Following this declaration, on 18 February 2025, Mr Ofori-Atta, through his legal representatives, communicated to the OSP, this time providing a definite date for his voluntary return to Ghana. This represented a significant shift from his previous stance of remaining outside Ghana indefinitely, and he requested that the OSP remove his name from its wanted list.

Consequently, the OSP removed Mr Ofori-Atta from the wanted list and ceased to consider him a fugitive from justice, pending his voluntary return to Ghana. Should he fail to return on the agreed date, the OSP will reinstate his wanted status and take necessary measures to secure his physical attendance in Ghana.

On 2 June 2025, Mr Ofori-Atta failed to appear before the OSP as scheduled, prompting the Office to reinstate his status as a wanted person and fugitive from justice. The OSP deemed this a violation of the agreement made in February 2025 and announced that it would take all necessary legal measures, including seeking an Interpol Red Notice and initiating extradition procedures if required. This reinstatement follows Mr Ofori-Atta’s continued absence despite prior assurances and constitutes a renewed effort by the OSP to compel his physical return to Ghana for questioning.

At the same time, the Office of the Special Prosecutor submitted an extradition request through the Attorney-General of Ghana, seeking the provisional arrest and return of Ofori-Atta to face prosecution.

=== THE NPA UPPF- Scandal ===
On 23 July 2025, the Office of the Special Prosecutor (OSP) charged seven individuals and three companies over an alleged GHS 280 million extortion and money laundering scheme involving the National Petroleum Authority (NPA). The accused include former NPA CEO Mustapha Abdul-Hamid, UPPF Coordinator Jacob Kwamina Amuah, NPA staff member Wendy Newman, and directors of Kel Logistics Ltd., Kings Energy Ltd., and Propnest Ltd.

Investigations revealed that, between 2022 and 2024, Abdul-Hamid, Amuah, and Newman allegedly extorted funds from petroleum transporters and oil marketing companies under the guise of official duties, without legal basis. Amuah is said to have transferred GHS 24 million directly to Abdul-Hamid, while GHS 227 million was routed through Newman. The remaining accused are alleged to have laundered the proceeds through the three companies to acquire assets such as fuel stations and real estate.

A total of 25 charges were filed, including extortion by a public officer and money laundering under the Criminal Offences Act, 1960 (Act 29) and the Anti-Money Laundering Act, 2020 (Act 1044). All accused pleaded not guilty and were granted bail under strict conditions, including GHS 2 million sureties and biweekly reporting to the OSP. One suspect, Osei Tutu Adjei, remains at large. Proceedings are ongoing.

=== Asante Berko Bribery Case ===
The Office of the Special Prosecutor (OSP) provided investigative and evidentiary assistance to the Federal Bureau of Investigation (FBI) of the United States through Ghana's established mutual legal assistance framework in the investigation and prosecution of Asante Kwaku Berko, a Ghanaian-American former banker, in connection with a bribery scheme involving Ghanaian government officials and the development and financing of a power plant in Ghana. The United States Department of Justice (DoJ) acknowledged that the OSP provided “significant assistance to this prosecution.”

On 6 August 2026, a federal jury in Brooklyn, New York, convicted Berko on all counts, finding him guilty of conspiring to pay and paying more than US$1 million in bribes to Ghanaian officials in connection with the power plant transaction.

The case has been cited by the OSP as an example of international cooperation in the investigation and prosecution of cross-border corruption, with the Office's assistance to U.S. authorities occurring through mutual legal assistance.

== See also ==
- Law enforcement in Ghana
- Corruption in Ghana
