= Joshua Kyeremeh =

Ghanaian politician (died 2021)

National Security Coordinator of Ghana
- In office 2017–2021
- President: Nana Akufo-Addo

Director of Bureau of National Investigations (BNI)
- In office 2005–2009
- President: John Agyekum Kufuor

Personal details
- Born: Ghana
- Died: January 18, 2021 Kwabenya, Ghana
- Party: New Patriotic Party
- Education: KNUST
- Occupation: Security expert, Politician

Joshua Kyeremeh (died 18 January 2021) was a Ghanaian politician and administrator and security expert. He was a member of the New Patriotic Party and was National security coordinator for the President of Ghana.

== Education and career ==
A product of the KNUST, and a former director of the National Intelligence Bureau (NIB), formerly known as the Bureau of National Investigations (BNI). He worked there for 22 years and has been at command levels in the Northern, Greater Accra, Ashanti and Upper East. He was also the head of the Investigations Unit of the BNI and rose to the deputy director and later the director of BNI from 2005 to 2009. After the December elections, he was part of the transition team.

== Political life ==
In January, 2017 he was appointed the National security coordinator at the Flagstaff House by President Nana Akuffo-Addo.

== Death ==
He died on Monday, 18 January 2021 at the Ga East Municipal Hospital. He died from COVID-19.

Political offices
Preceded by	Head of Operations; Ghana; 2017 -	Incumbent
