= Value Added Tax Service =

Government of Ghana agency

The Value Added Tax Service of Ghana is the Government of Ghana agency responsible for the mobilization of tax for the government. The service was formed after the promulgation of the Revenue Agencies (Governing) Board Act in 1998. The Act established a Central governing body to oversee the activities of the then governing boards of IRS, CEPS and VATS.
