= Customs and Excise =

Customs and Excise refers to customs duty and excise duty.

In certain countries, the national tax authorities that are responsible for collecting those duties are named Customs and Excise, including:

- HM Customs and Excise, a department of the British government until 2005
- HM Revenue and Customs a department formed by the merger of HM Customs and Excise with Inland Revenue in 2005
- Hong Kong Customs and Excise Department
- Directorate General of Customs and Excise (Indonesia)
- In Ghana, the Customs, Excise and Preventive Service
- In Singapore, the defunct Customs and Excise Department, which was replaced by the Singapore Customs on 1 April 2003
