= Law enforcement in Ghana =

Law enforcement in Ghana is carried out by the Ghana Police Service and several specialised public institutions. The Police Service is the principal national police agency and operates under a unified command headed by the Inspector-General of Police. Article 200 of the 1992 Constitution assigns it the traditional role of maintaining law and order, while the Police Service Act, 1970 (Act 350) requires it to prevent and detect crime, apprehend offenders, and protect public safety and property.

Other institutions perform specialised law-enforcement functions. The Ghana Immigration Service administers immigration law, regulates the entry and residence of foreign nationals, and patrols Ghana's borders. The Economic and Organised Crime Office investigates economic and organised crime and may prosecute offences with the authority of the Attorney-General. The Narcotics Control Commission enforces laws concerning illicit drugs, precursor chemicals and controlled substances, while the Customs Division of the Ghana Revenue Authority enforces customs laws and conducts preventive operations at approved and unapproved borders.

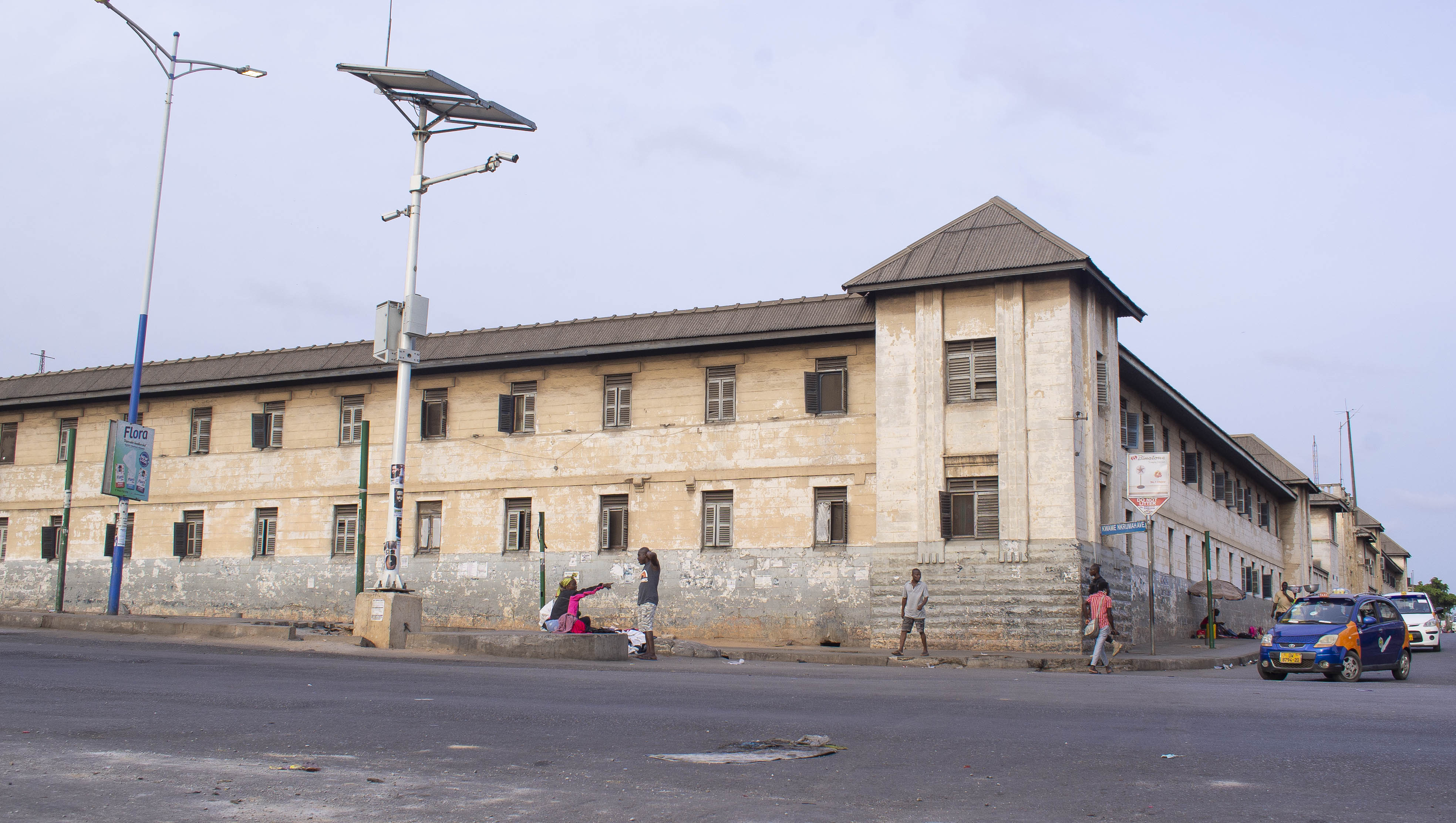
Accra Central Police Station

== History ==
Before British colonial rule, the Asante state maintained officials responsible for public order and road security. Kumasi had a uniformed police force, while officials known as the Nkwansrafo, or road wardens, monitored the movement of traders and other travellers on Asante roads, performed scouting duties and collected tolls.. British colonial authorities introduced a professional police force in 1831. The colonial administrator George Maclean, Governor of the Gold Coast, recruited 129 men to patrol trade routes between the Asante Empire and the coast and to protect colonial merchants and officials around Cape Coast Castle.

In 1844, the colonial authorities took control of the force, which became known as the Gold Coast Militia and Police. When Britain assumed full sovereignty over the Gold Coast in 1871, the force of 90 men was reinforced by a further 400 personnel. All commissioned officers at the time were British. The force was renamed the Gold Coast Constabulary in 1876.

The Police Ordinance of 1894 provided the legal basis for a civilian police force in the colony. By 1902, the force had been divided into the General, Escort, Mines and Railway Police, an arrangement recognised by the Police (Amendment) Ordinance of 1904. A Marine Police unit was established in 1906 and was replaced by the Customs, Excise and Preventive Service in 1942. The Criminal Investigation Department was established in 1922.

Following the 1948 Accra riots, the Special Branch and Police Reserve Unit were established. The Special Branch gathered intelligence and was also used to monitor political opponents, while the Reserve Unit performed riot-control duties and became known for its harsh treatment of demonstrators.

The Wireless and Communications Unit was opened in June 1950. A women's branch was established with 12 officers in 1952. The Police College was opened in 1959. Prior to this, all officers were trained in the United Kingdom.

The first Ghanaian to head the Ghana Police was E. R. T. Madjitey, who was appointed on 9 October 1958.

== Principal institutions ==
=== Ghana Police Service ===
The Ghana Police Service is the country's principal civilian police organisation. Article 200 of the 1992 Constitution establishes a single Police Service and provides that no other police service may be created except under an Act of Parliament. The Constitution also establishes the Police Council, which advises the President on matters of policy relating to internal security and the administration of the Service.

The Police Service Act, 1970 (Act 350) provides the statutory framework for the Service. Its duties include preventing and detecting crime, apprehending offenders, maintaining public order and protecting people and property. Police officers also perform functions assigned to them under other enactments.

=== Ghana Immigration Service ===
The Ghana Immigration Service regulates the entry, residence, employment and departure of foreign nationals. Under the Immigration Service Act, 2016 (Act 908), it examines travel documents, enforces immigration and employment laws concerning non-Ghanaians, manages and patrols Ghana's borders, and issues entry visas and residence or work permits through the Comptroller-General or an authorised representative.

=== Economic and Organised Crime Office ===
The Economic and Organised Crime Office (EOCO) is a specialised agency established under the Economic and Organised Crime Office Act, 2010 (Act 804). It monitors and investigates serious economic and organised crime, including money laundering, human trafficking, prohibited cyber activity, tax fraud and offences involving public property. It may also recover proceeds of crime and, with the authority of the Attorney-General, prosecute offences falling within its mandate.

=== Office of the Special Prosecutor ===
The Office of the Special Prosecutor was established under the Office of the Special Prosecutor Act, 2017 (Act 959). Under its enabling legislation, it investigates alleged or suspected corruption and corruption-related offences involving public officers, politically exposed persons and private individuals. Its statutory functions also include prosecution, asset recovery and measures intended to prevent corruption.

=== Narcotics Control Commission ===
The Narcotics Control Commission was established under the Narcotics Control Commission Act, 2020 (Act 1019), replacing the former Narcotics Control Board. Its responsibilities combine law enforcement with drug-demand reduction. The Commission investigates narcotics offences, works to prevent illicit cultivation and trafficking, controls precursor chemicals and supports treatment, rehabilitation and public education concerning substance-use disorders.

=== Customs Division ===
The Customs Division of the Ghana Revenue Authority administers and enforces customs legislation. Its officers control the movement of goods, persons and means of transport through customs-controlled areas; collect duties on imported and exported goods; and may detain or seize goods dealt with contrary to customs law. The principal legislation governing these functions is the Customs Act, 2015 (Act 891).

== Organization of the Ghana Police Service ==
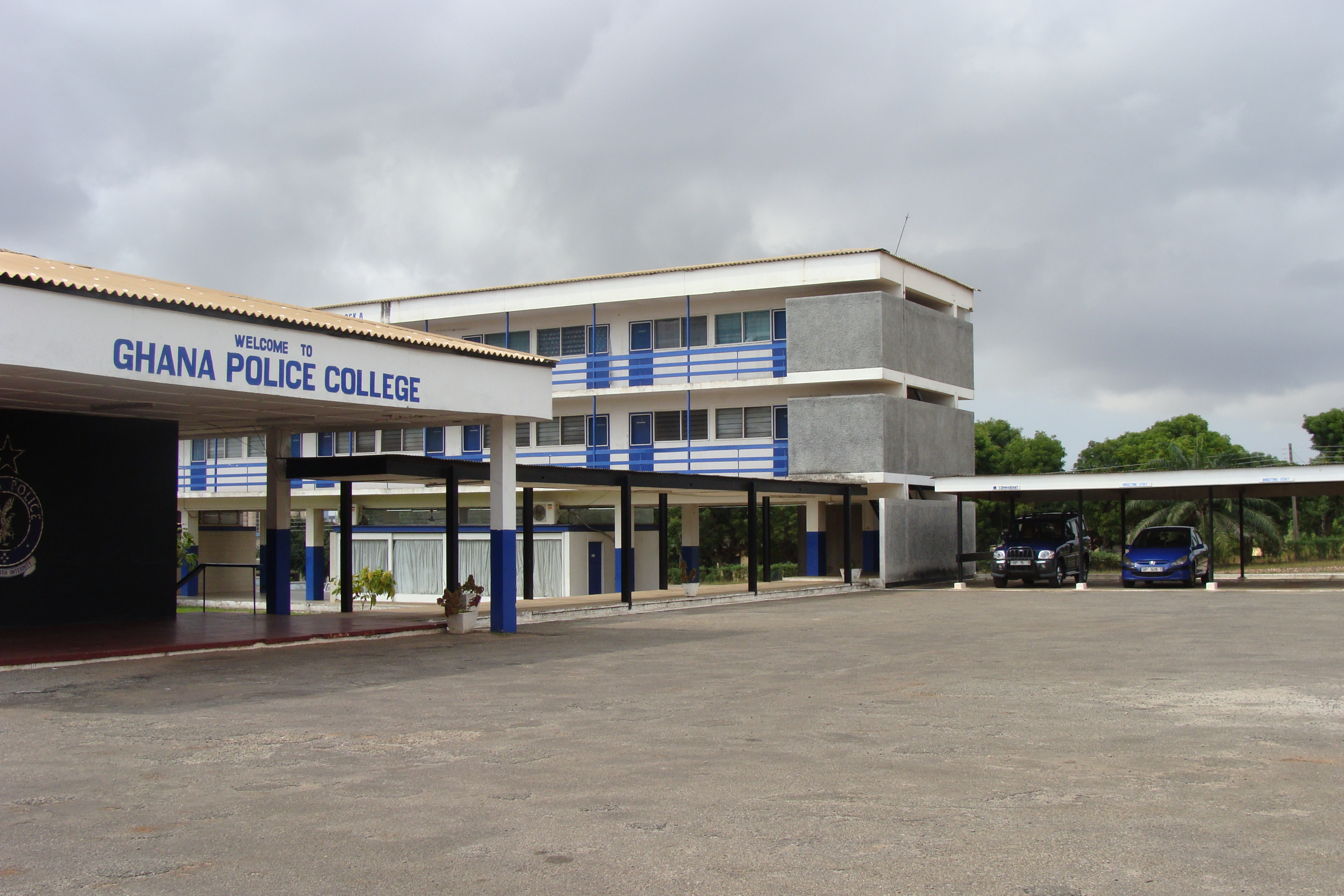
The grounds of the Ghana Police College, in Accra.

=== National ===
The Ghana Police Service is organised as a single national service under the command of the Inspector-General of Police. The Inspector-General heads the Police Management Board, whose schedule officers assist with the day-to-day administration of the Service.

The Service is divided into operational, investigative, administrative and support departments. These include the Criminal Investigation Department, Motor Traffic and Transport Directorate, Domestic Violence and Victim Support Unit, Police College, Public Relations Department, Police Hospital, Marine, Ports and Railways Department, and Community Policing Department.

=== Criminal Investigation Department ===
The Criminal Investigation Department coordinates criminal investigations throughout the Service. Its responsibilities include supervising regional, divisional, district and station-level criminal-investigation units; overseeing forensic services; gathering and analysing criminal intelligence; training detectives; compiling crime statistics; and developing crime-prevention and investigation strategies.

=== Regional commands ===
The Police Service operates 25 regional commands. Each command is led by a Regional Commander who is responsible to the Inspector-General of Police for the administration and operational performance of the personnel within the region.

Regional commanders supervise crime prevention, law enforcement and criminal investigations in their jurisdictions. They also oversee discipline, personnel administration, police facilities and the work of regional Criminal Investigation Department units. Regional commands are divided into divisions, districts, police stations and posts, with the number and arrangement varying by region.

=== Professional standards and internal discipline ===
The Police Professional Standards Bureau monitors compliance with professional standards, human rights requirements and democratic-policing principles. It inspects police facilities and records, investigates complaints made by members of the public against police officers, and examines allegations of misconduct, corruption and other offences involving police personnel.

== Oversight and accountability ==
The Police Council is the constitutional body responsible for advising the President on policy relating to internal security, the administration and budgeting of the Police Service, and the promotion of senior officers. The Vice-President chairs the Council. Its membership also includes the minister responsible for the interior, the Inspector-General of Police, the Attorney-General or a representative, and representatives of the legal profession, retired police officers and serving police personnel.

Complaints about police misconduct may be investigated internally by the Police Professional Standards Bureau. Its responsibilities include investigating complaints from members of the public, allegations of corruption and misconduct, and matters referred by the Inspector-General of Police or the Police Management Board.

External oversight is also exercised by the Commission on Human Rights and Administrative Justice (CHRAJ). Under Article 218 of the Constitution and the Commission on Human Rights and Administrative Justice Act, 1993 (Act 456), CHRAJ may investigate complaints concerning human-rights violations, injustice, corruption, abuse of power and unfair treatment by public officers. Its jurisdiction includes complaints concerning the Police Service and Prison Service where they relate to fair administration or the structure of those services.

A regional assessment published by the African Policing Civilian Oversight Forum reported limited publicly available information about the Police Council's external oversight role and raised concerns about its political independence and resources.

== Ranks ==
The Police Service Regulations, 2012 (C.I. 76) divide the posts and ranks of the Ghana Police Service into senior officers and junior officers. The regulations also provide for the Police Council to establish additional posts and ranks and prescribe the badges worn by each rank.

=== Superior officers ===
- Inspector General of Police( A star surrounded by laurel leaves and surmounted by two eagles facing each other and one star).
- Deputy Inspector General ( A star surrounded by laurel leaves and surmounted by two eagles facing each other and two star).
- Commissioner ( A star surrounded by laurel leaves and surmounted by two stars).
- Deputy Commissioner( A star surrounded by laurel leaves and surmounted by one star)
- Assistant Commissioner( A star surrounded by laurel leaves)
- Chief Superintendent (Two eagles facing each other and surmounted by one star).
- Superintendent (Two eagles facing each other).
- Deputy Superintendent (Three stars).
- Assistant Superintendent (Two stars).

=== Subordinate Police Officers ===
- Chief Inspector
- Inspector
- Sergeant
- Corporal
- Lance Corporal
- Constable

== See also ==
- Bureau of National Investigations (BNI) (formerly Special Branch)
- Inspector General of Police (IGP)
- Border Guard Units
- Crime in Ghana
