= Carl Setorwu Modey =

Ghanaian diplomat and military officer

High Commissioner of Ghana to Sierra Leone

Personal details
- Education: University of Ibadan
- Occupation: Military officer
- Profession: Diplomat

Major General Carl Setorwu Modey is a Ghanaian former diplomat and a retired military officer of the Ghana Armed Forces.

== Education ==
From 1985 to 1986, Modey received the Honour Graduate of Course 7 of the Ghana Armed Forces Command and Staff College in Teshie in the Greater Accra Region of Ghana.

He has a master's degree in Military Art and Science (MMAS) from the United States Command and General Staff College in Fort Leavenworth in Kansas from 1987 to 1988. He also has a Master of Science in Strategic Studies from the University of Ibadan in Nigeria.

In 2003, he also attended the Nigeria National Defence College in Abuja. He also is a member of the Chartered Institute of Arbitrators in the United Kingdom. He is also a graduate member of the Chartered Institute of Administration and Management Consultants

== Career ==
Modey began his career in the Ghana Army Engineers Regiment on 21 July 1973.

In 2008, Modey was appointed by the United Nations Secretary-General as the Deputy Force Commander for the United Nations Mission in Liberia. He replaced Major General Tahir Mohammed from Pakistan.

On 28 November 2010, he was seconded from the Ghana Armed Forces to the Customs Division as a Commissioner of the Ghana Revenue Authority.

== Ambassadorial role ==
In 2014, Modey was appointed as the High Commissioner of Ghana to Sierra Leone by John Mahama.

== Philanthropy ==
In September 2014, Modey presented 850 bags of Ghanaian rice to the Deputy Minister of Health II, Madam Madina Rahman in Sierra Leone for the survivors of Ebola disease.

== Personal life ==
Modey is married and has children. He plays golf.
