= Cynthia Lamptey =

Ghanaian lawyer

Deputy Special Prosecutor of Ghana
- Incumbent
- Assumed office 2018
- President: Nana Akufo-Addo
- Preceded by: New

Personal details
- Born: 15 December 1959 (age 66) Adabraka, Accra, Ghana
- Education: Aburi Girls Senior High School; Mfantsiman Girls' Senior High School
- Alma mater: University of Ghana; Ghana School of Law
- Occupation: Prosecutor
- Profession: Lawyer

Cynthia Jane Naa-Koshie Lamptey is a Ghanaian lawyer and public servant. She served as the Director of Public Prosecutions under the John Dramani Mahama administration. She was appointed deputy Special Prosecutor of Ghana in 2018. She served as the acting Special Prosecutor of Ghana following the resignation of the then Special Prosecutor, Martin Amidu, on 16 November 2020, until the appointment of Kissi Agyebeng on 5 August 2021.

== Early life and education ==
Lamptey was born on 15 December 1959, in Adabraka, Accra, Ghana.

Lamptey began her formal education at the New Era Preparatory School in Tudu, Accra, from 1965 to 1966. She then proceeded to the University of Ghana Primary School Legon, from 1966 to 1972, where she sat for her Common Entrance Examination in 1972. From 1971 to 1977, she attended Aburi Girls Secondary School in Aburi, where she obtained her G.C.E. 'O' Level Certificate. She continued her education at Mfantsiman Girls Secondary School, where she obtained a G.C.E. 'A' Level Certificate in 1979.

Lamptey then pursued her tertiary education at the Workers College of the University of Ghana, where she earned a Bachelor of Arts degree in Law and Sociology in 1980. She went on to study law at the Ghana School of Law and was called to the Ghana Bar in March 1988.

== Working life ==
Lamptey is a lawyer by profession, she started as a National Service Personnel at the Civil Defence Organisation from October 1987 to July 1988. She then worked as an Assistant State Attorney at the Ministry of Justice and Attorney-General's Department in Accra and Koforidua from August 1989 to April 2015. In 1995 she became the state attorney at the Attorney-General's Department and rose through the ranks till she was appointment Director of Public Prosecutions during the John Mahama administration. As the country's chief prosecutor, she handled several high-profile prosecutions. Some of her prosecutions include the case of the alleged stealing of 86.9 million cedis by an Executive Director of the National Service Scheme and the criminal prosecution of Alfred Agbesi Woyome. Alfred Woyome, a known financier of the National Democratic Congress, was charged by a Ghanaian court of fraudulently receiving a 52 million cedis judgment debt against Ghana. In 2014, prosecuted two Ghanaian women who had played a leading role in the exportation of cocaine to the United Kingdom. After 20 years of service to the nation, she left the department in 2015. She was replaced by Yvonne Attakorah Obuobisa. Following her work as a public prosecutor, she was appointed as Deputy Director of the Legal Aid Board from September 2015 to April 2017. Prior to her appointment as deputy Special Prosecutor of Ghana, she was the Deputy Registrar-General at the Registrar-General's Department.

== Deputy Special Prosecutor of Ghana ==
In January 2018, after the official appointment of Martin Amidu as Ghana's first Special Prosecutor, the Ghanaian media began publishing Lamptey's name as his deputy. Lamptey had worked under Amidu when the latter was the substantive Attorney General in the John Atta Mills administration. The Office of the Special Prosecutor was created by the Nana Addo Dankwa Akuffo-Addo administration in 2017 with the aim of allowing the independent prosecution of politicians and people affiliated with political parties or their members who are deemed as being corrupt. Following her nomination, she was appointed, she deputy Special Prosecutor in 2018. She then became the first person to be deputy Special Prosecutor of Ghana. She now serves as the acting Special Prosecutor of Ghana after the then Special Prosecutor, Martin Amidu he resigned on 16 November 2020.
