= Cletus Avoka =

Ghanaian politician

Hon. Cletus Apul Avoka MP
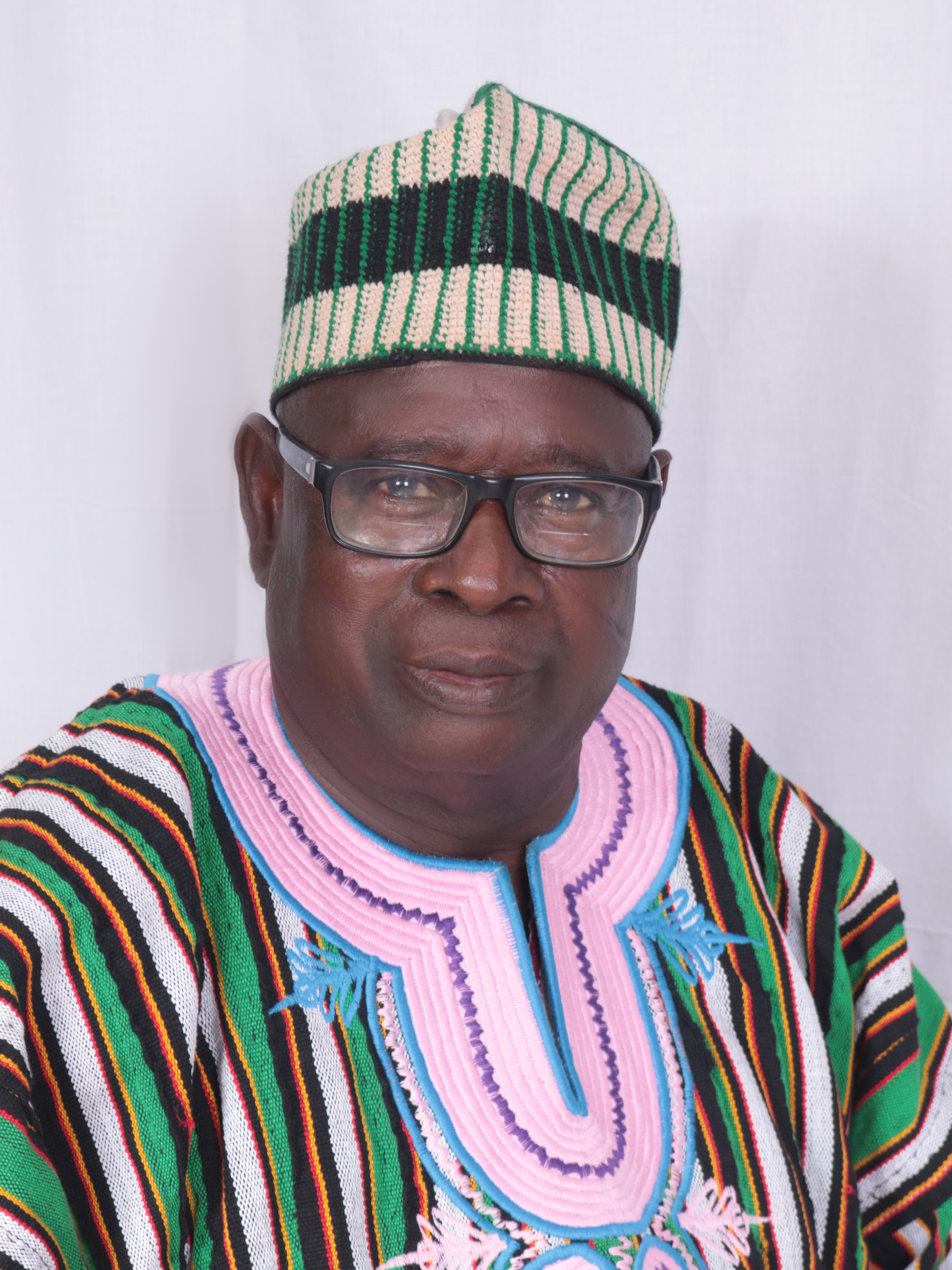

Member of the Ghana Parliament for Zebilla constituency
- In office 7 January 2021 – 7 January 2025
- Preceded by: Frank Fuseini Adongo
- Succeeded by: Ebenezer Alumire Ndebilla
- In office 7 January 2009 – 6 January 2017
- Preceded by: John Akparibo Ndebugre
- Succeeded by: Frank Fuseini Adongo

Member of the Ghana Parliament for Bawku West
- In office 7 January 1993 – 6 January 2005
- Preceded by: Constituency merged
- Succeeded by: John Akparibo Ndebugre (constituency name changed to Zebilla)

Minister for Interior
- In office Feb 2009 – Jan 2010
- President: John Atta Mills
- Preceded by: Kwame Addo-Kufuor
- Succeeded by: Martin Amidu

Personal details
- Party: National Democratic Congress
- Education: Navrongo Senior High School
- Alma mater: University of Ghana; Ghana School of Law

Cletus Apul Avoka (born 20 November 1951) is a Ghanaian lawyer, politician and member of the Parliament of Ghana representing the Zebilla constituency in the Upper East region.

He was the majority leader of the parliament during his time in office and also once served as the Minister of Interior and Minister for Lands and Forestry.

== Early life and education ==
Cletus Apul Avoka was born 30 November 1951. He hails from Teshie near Zebilla, Upper East Region. He attended Navrongo Secondary School and the University of Ghana where he obtained his L.L.B in 1976. He also attended Ghana School of Law where he obtained his Bachelor of Law degree in 1978.

== Political career ==
After the 2012 general elections, he was replaced by Benjamin Kunbuor for the 6th Parliament of the 4th Republic as Majority Leader. He was the Minister for Interior in the National Democratic Congress government of John Atta Mills in Ghana until January 2010.

His first ministerial position was as Minister for Lands and Forestry in the government of Jerry Rawlings. He was formerly the Member of Parliament for Bawku West constituency in the Upper East region of Ghana from 1993 to 2005.

In the 2008 parliamentary election, he re-entered parliament as the second MP for the Zebilla constituency and assumed office in January 2009.

=== 2000 elections ===
Avoka was also the MP for Garu Tempane from 2001 to 2004. In the year 2000, he won the general elections as the member of parliament for the Garu-Tempane constituency of the Upper East Region of Ghana. He won as an independent candidate in that election for the Upper East Region. Akudibila was elected with 14,282 valid votes cast.

This was equivalent to 45.40% of the total valid votes cast. He was elected over William Azuma Dominic of the National Democratic Congress, William Pullam of the Peoples National Convention Party, Emmanuel S.N.Asigri of the New Patriotic Party, Tindogo D.Ashock of the Convention Peoples Party, Halid M.Yussif of the United Ghana Movement and Hamidu Sahanona of the National Reform Party.

These acquired 12,224, 2,908, 1,360, 293, 246,138 votes out of the total valid votes cast respectively. These were equivalent to 38.90%, 9.20%, 4.30%,0.90%, 0.80%, 0.40% respectively of total valid votes cast.

During the 2008 Ghanaian general elections, he polled 13,074 votes out of the 32,215 valid votes cast representing 40.50% over Appiah Moses who polled 10,470 votes representing 32.50%, John Akparibo who polled 6,701 votes representing 20.80%, Sulley Awanni Agholisi who polled 1,461 votes representing 4.54%, Azumah Yusif Ndago who polled 273 votes representing 0.85% and Atiah Kudugu who polled 236 votes representing 0.73%

He won again in the 2012 Ghanaian general elections with 21,900 votes out of the 41,106 valid votes cast representing 53.28% over Frank Fuseini Adongo who polled 17,082 votes representing 41.56%, Mallam Yusuf Isa who polled 1,739 votes representing 4.23% and Atangnaba Abraham who polled 385 votes representing 0.94%

== Personal life ==
Avoka is a Catholic Christian and is married with four children.

== See also ==
- List of Mills government ministers

Parliament of Ghana
| New title | Bawku West; 1993–2005 | Constituency changed |
| Preceded by John Akparibo Ndebugre | Zebilla; 2009–present | Incumbent |
Political offices
| Preceded by | Ministry of Lands and Forestry; 1997–1999 | Succeeded by |
| Preceded by Christine Amoako-Nuamah | Minister for Environment, Science and Technology; 1999–2001 | Succeeded by Dominic Kwaku Fobih |
| Preceded by Kwame Addo-Kufuor | Minister for Interior; 2009–2010 | Succeeded by Martin Amidu |
Party political offices
| Preceded by Alban Bagbin | Majority Leader; 2010 – 6 January 2013 | Succeeded by Benjamin Kunbuor |
Incumbent
