= Ebenezer Alumire Ndebilla =

Ghanaian politician

Hon. [Ebenezer Alumire Ndebilla]

Member of Parliament for Zebilla
- Incumbent
- Assumed office 7 January 2025
- Preceded by: Cletus Apul Avoka

Personal details
- Born: July 7, 1981 (age 45) Ghana
- Party: National Democratic Congress
- Education: Kwame Nkrumah University of Science and Technology; University of Ghana
- Profession: Development worker, banker
- Committees: Food, Agriculture and Cocoa Affairs Committee; Ethics and Standards Committee

Ebenezer Alumire Ndebilla (born 7 July 1981) is a Ghanaian development worker and politician. He is the Member of Parliament for the Zebilla Constituency in the Upper East Region, representing the National Democratic Congress (NDC) in the 9th Parliament of the Fourth Republic.

== Early life and education ==
Ndebilla was born on 7 July 1981. He earned a Bachelor of Arts degree in Economics from the Kwame Nkrumah University of Science and Technology in 2009, and later obtained a Master of Arts in Economic Policy Management from the University of Ghana in 2013.

== Political career ==
Ndebilla contested the NDC parliamentary primaries for Zebilla in 2015 and 2019 but lost to incumbent Cletus Apul Avoka. In May 2023, he won the NDC primary, securing the party’s nomination for the 2024 general election.

In the 2024 general election, he was elected Member of Parliament for Zebilla with 33,657 votes, defeating New Patriotic Party candidate John Kingsley Krugu and independent candidate Simon Awiah.

=== Parliamentary work ===
Ndebilla serves on the Food, Agriculture and Cocoa Affairs Committee and the Ethics and Standards Committee.

== Policy views and advocacy ==
In 2025, Ndebilla called for the revival of the “Trees for Life” afforestation initiative to address food insecurity in Northern Ghana. He also criticized the government's "One Village One Dam" initiative, describing it as ineffective in addressing water scarcity in his constituency.

Ndebilla described the 2025 national budget as “pro-poor,” emphasizing its positive impact on agriculture and rural development.
