= Binaba =

- Village
- Location of Binaba in Upper East region
- Coordinates: 10°48′N 0°28′W
- Country: Ghana
- Region: Upper East Region
- District: Bawku West District

Population (2013)
  - Total: —
- Time zone: GMT
  - Summer (DST): GMT

Binaba is a rural village in the Bawku West District of the Upper East Region in north Ghana. The village is 15 km south of the district capital Zebilla.

== Geography ==
There is a dry season, which includes Haramattan winds from mid-November through late March. The rainy season consists of monsoon rains.

== Economy ==
The principal economic activity is agriculture based on a unimodal distribution of rain. Staple crops include millet, rice and corn. Other important food crops include shea, peanuts, sweet potatoes, mangoes, watermelons and leafy vegetables.

== Demographics ==
=== Population ===
There are approximately 65,000 people in Binaba and the surrounding villages of Kusanaba, Zongoyiri, Gori, Kopella, Azuera, Tamocka and Dagunga.
