= Economic and Organised Crime Office =

Government agency investigating economic and organised crimes in Ghana

- Abbreviation: EOCO
- Motto: "Integrity, Justice, Accountability"

Agency overview
- Formed: 2010

Jurisdictional structure
- Federal agency: GH
- Operations jurisdiction: GH
- Constituting instruments: Constitution of Ghana, 1992; Economic and Organised Crime Office Act, 2010 (Act 804)
- General nature: Federal law enforcement

Operational structure
- Headquarters: Barnes Road, adjacent to Old Parliament House, High Street, Accra
- Agency executive: Rosemond Brown, Director-General
- Divisions: Investigations, Prosecution, Asset Recovery & Management, Cybercrime & Intelligence, Research & Strategy, Operations, Finance, Human Resource & Administration

Website
- https://www.eoco.gov.gh

The Economic and Organised Crime Office (EOCO) is a law enforcement agency in Ghana responsible for investigating, prosecuting, and recovering proceeds of serious economic and organised crimes. EOCO was established under the Economic and Organised Crime Office Act, 2010 (Act 804) and replaced the Serious Fraud Office.

== History ==
EOCO was formed in 2010 to address increasing concerns over economic crimes, corruption, fraud, and organised crime in Ghana. It consolidated functions from the defunct Serious Fraud Office and expanded its mandate to include human trafficking, cybercrime, and money laundering. The agency operates under the Ministry of Justice and the Attorney-General but functions independently in its investigations.

== Notable cases ==
=== Large-scale asset recoveries ===
- EOCO recovered GH¢214.64 million in proceeds of crime. GH¢35.34 million was remitted directly into the Consolidated Fund, and the remainder (GH¢179.29 million) recovered indirectly.
- By September 2022, EOCO had recovered GH¢27.55 million, with GH¢11.14 million remitted directly to the Consolidated Fund.
- From 2014 to March 2019, EOCO recovered GH¢99,165,369.29 from various economic crimes including tax fraud, money laundering, payroll fraud, and false pretences.

=== Human trafficking & job-scam rings ===
- EOCO rescued 26 victims from a human trafficking syndicate exploiting the QNET brand. Nine suspects were arrested.
- 35 suspects arrested in Oyarifa for luring over 200 victims with fake job opportunities. Victims were forced into exploitative labor and cybercrime.

=== High-Profile Investigations ===
- Investigation of a $72 million procurement by the Ghana Social Security and National Insurance Trust.
- EOCO froze assets and bank accounts of former COCOBOD Stephen Opuni over fraud allegations.
- EOCO took over investigations from Office of the Special Prosecutor in 2024 concerning allegations of money laundering by the former Minister for Sanitation and Water Resources.
- EOCO re-arrests former CEO of National Food and Buffer Stock Company, Hanan Abdul-Wahab Aludiba, and his wife , Hajia Fazia Seidu Wuni shortly after the Attorney General discontinued charges against in an investigation.
- Dennis Miracles Aboagye arrested by EOCO over alleged involvement in GHC55 million procurement irregularities during his tenure as the Executive Secretary of Inter-Ministerial Coordinating Committee on Decentralization.

== See also ==
- Corruption in Ghana
- Law enforcement in Ghana
- Office of the Special Prosecutor (Ghana)
