= John Akparibo Ndebugre =

Ghanaian politician (1950–2022)

Hon. John Akparibo Ndebugre

Member of Parliament for Zebilla Constituency
- In office 7 January 2005 – 6 January 2009
- President: John Kufuor

Personal details
- Born: 12 March 1950 Gold Coast
- Died: 6 May 2022 (aged 72) Zebilla, Ghana
- Party: People's National Convention
- Education: Kwame Nkrumah University of Science and Technology, Ghana School of Law
- Profession: Lawyer

John Akparibo Ndebugre (12 March 1950 – 6 May 2022) was a Ghanaian politician of the Republic of Ghana. He was the Member of Parliament representing Zebilla constituency of the Upper East Region of Ghana in the 4th Parliament of the 4th Republic of Ghana. He was a member of the People's National Convention.

== Early life and education ==
Ndebugre was born on 12 March 1950. He was a product of Kwame Nkrumah University of Science and Technology. He held a Bachelor of Science degree from the university. He was also a product of the Ghana School of Law. He acquired a Bachelor of Law degree from the school.

== Career ==
Ndebugre was a lawyer by profession.

== Political career ==
Ndebugre was a member of the People's National Convention. He became a member of parliament from January 2005 after emerging winner in the General Election in December 2004. He was elected as the member of parliament for the Zebilla constituency in the fourth parliament of the fourth Republic of Ghana.

== Elections ==
Ndebugre was elected as the member of parliament for the Zebilla constituency of the Upper East Region of Ghana for the first time in the 2004 Ghanaian general elections. He won on the ticket of the People's National Convention. His constituency was a part of the 3 parliamentary seats out of 13 seats won by the People's National Convention in that election for the Upper East Region. The People's National Convention won a minority total of 4 parliamentary seats out of 230 seats. He was elected with 11,026 votes out of 31,188 total valid votes cast. This was equivalent to 35.4% of total valid votes cast. He was elected over Appiah Moses of the New Patriotic Party, Cletus Apul Avoka of the National Democratic Congress and Sulley Aneda Apam of the Convention People's Party. These obtained 8,921, 10,913 and 328 votes respectively of total votes cast. These were equivalent to 28.6%, 35% and 1.1% respectively of total valid votes cast.

== See also ==
- List of MPs elected in the 2004 Ghanaian parliamentary election
