= Frank Fuseini Adongo =

Ghanaian politician

Hon. Frank Fuseini Adongo MP

Member of Parliament, Deputy Regional Minister
- President: Nana Akuffo-Addo
- Preceded by: Cletus Apul Avoka
- Succeeded by: Cletus Apul Avoka

Personal details
- Born: [Zebilla]Ghana
- Party: New Patriotic Party

Frank Fuseini Adongo is a Ghanaian politician and a [Member of the 7th Parliament of Ghana]. He is a member of the New Patriotic Party and was the Deputy Regional Minister of the Upper East Region of Ghana under Nana Akuffo-Addo first administration

== Political life ==
In March 2017, President Nana Akufo-Addo, named him one of the ten deputy regional ministers who would form part of his government. He was vetted by the Appointments Committee of the Parliament of Ghana in the same month. He was approved by the committee and his name was forwarded to Speaker of Parliament for further approval by the general house of parliament.
