= Awani Akuguri =

Ghanaian politician

Member of the Ghana Parliament for Zebilla
- In office 1965–1966
- Preceded by: New
- Succeeded by: Ayamba Atia

Personal details
- Born: Awani Akuguri Gold Coast
- Party: Convention People's Party

Awani Akuguri was a Ghanaian politician in the first republic. He was the member of parliament for the Zebilla constituency from 1965 to 1966.

== See also ==
- List of MPs elected in the 1965 Ghanaian parliamentary election
