= Godwin Kudzo Tameklo =

National Petroleum Authority (NPA) Chief Executive

- Born: February 25, 1982 (age 44); Nkwanta
- Education: University of Ghana (BA, LLB, LLM)
- Occupations: Lawyer, politician, public servant
- Known for: CEO, National Petroleum Authority, Director-Legal, NDC
- Political party: National Democratic Congress (Ghana)

Godwin Kudzo Tameklo (born February 25, 1982) is a Ghanaian lawyer, politician, and public servant. He is the Chief Executive Officer of the National Petroleum Authority.

== Early life and education ==
Tameklo was born in Nkwanta, a town in the Nkwanta South district of Oti Region.

He started his basic school education at Nkwanta Primary ‘B’ and completed at Presby Primary and Junior High School in Kpando.

After graduating from high school, Tameklo gained admission at the University of Ghana, Legon where he studied economics, geography and resource development. He further studied law at the same university and was called to the Ghana Bar in 2013.

== Career and politics ==
Tameklo is a lawyer by profession. He is a partner at Ayine & Partners, where his areas of practice include natural-resources law, oil and gas, and intellectual-property law.

In January 2025, President John Dramani Mahama appointed him as CEO of the state-owned National Petroleum Authority (NPA).

Tameklo is a member of the National Democratic Congress (NDC). and serves as Director of Legal Affairs of the party since August 2023.
