= Zebilla =

- District Capital
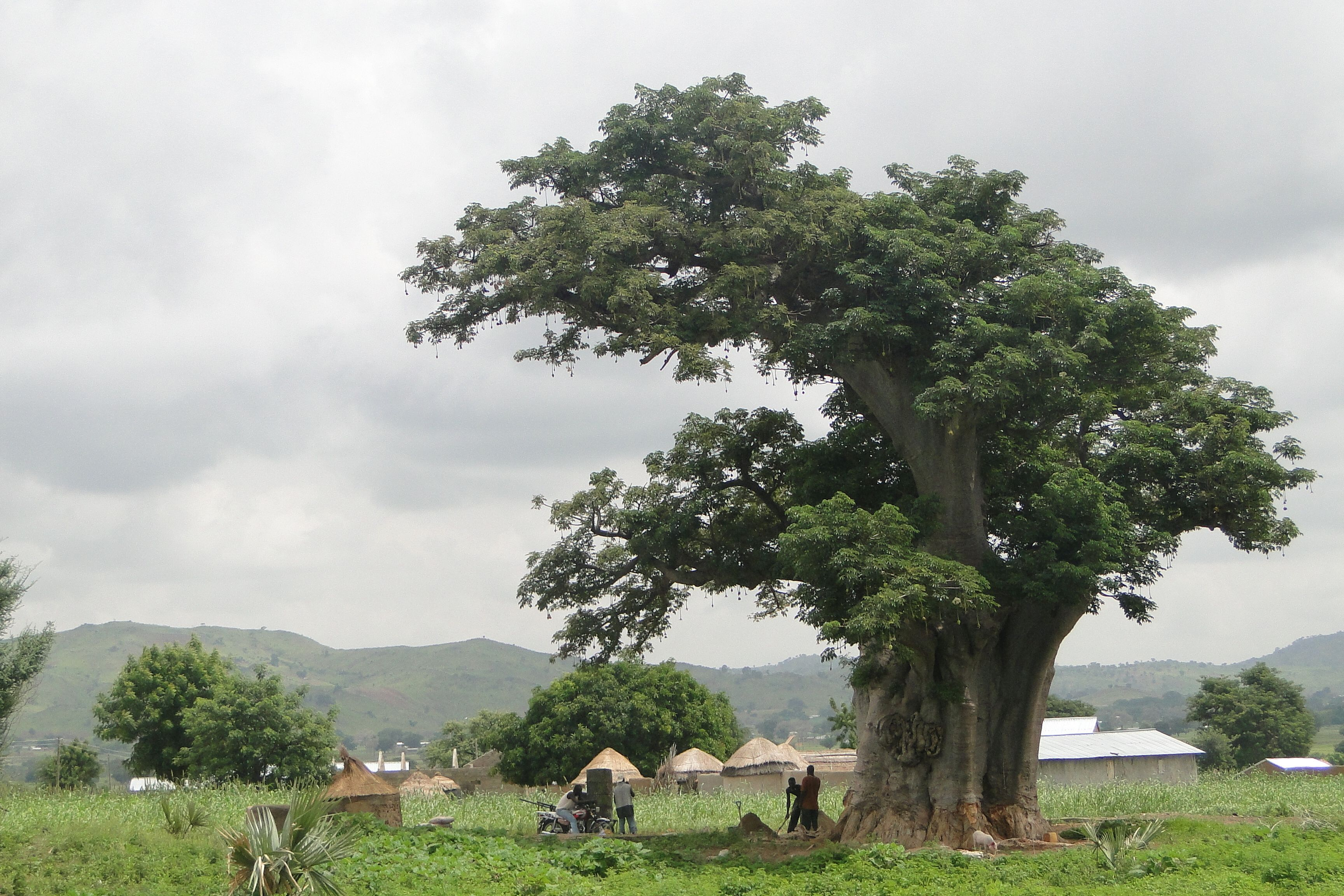

- Location of Zebilla in Upper East region
- Coordinates: 10°55′N 0°31′W
- Country: Ghana
- Region: Upper East Region
- District: Bawku West District

Population (2013)
  - Total: —
- Time zone: GMT
  - Summer (DST): GMT

Zebilla is a town and is the capital of Bawku West District, a district in the Upper East Region of north Ghana. Zebilla is renowned for its abundance of guinea fowl.

== See also ==
Binaba – 15 km south of Zebilla
