= National Petroleum Authority =

Ghanaian government agency

National Petroleum Authority (NPA) is a statutory body set up by the Government of Ghana to regulate, oversee and monitor the Ghanaian petroleum industry. The authority was established after calls by the general public for efficiency, growth and stakeholder satisfaction in the industry. Dr. Mustapha Abdul-Hamid headed the NPA. As at 2026, Godwin Edudzi Tameklo is the chief executive of the authority.

== History ==
The authority was set up by Legislative Instrument of the Parliament of Ghana and it is powered by NPA Act of 2005. It is also known as ACT 691. The authority is headquartered in Accra.

== Functions ==
The regulatory mission of the NPA allows it to regularly monitor and adjust the price of Petroleum products in Ghana.

== Lawsuits and Cases ==
=== NPA vs OSP ===
In November 2025, Ghana’s Office of the Special Prosecutor (OSP) froze assets worth over GH₵100 million and US$100,000 linked to an alleged extortion and money laundering scheme at the National Petroleum Authority (NPA).

The case involves former NPA Chief Executive Dr. Mustapha Abdul-Hamid and nine others accused of diverting more than GH₵291 million and US$332,000 between 2022 and 2024. The suspects face 54 charges, including extortion, money laundering, and abuse of office. The OSP, acting under Act 959, said the freeze aims to prevent the dissipation of suspected illicit assets while investigations and prosecutions continue.

In January 2026, Ghana’s Office of the Special Prosecutor (OSP) reported in its 2025 Half-Yearly Report that it had seized and taken control of various high-value assets linked to an ongoing criminal case involving former National Petroleum Authority Chief Executive Dr. Mustapha Abdul-Hamid and nine others. The assets included four fuel stations in Accra (Opeikuma, Dansoman, Abeka Lapaz and Millennium City), several parcels of land across the country, high-end residential properties in Accra, multiple fuel tanker trucks, and cash totaling GH¢951,995.56. The OSP also seized luxury vehicles in a related investigation. The actions form part of exhibits in The Republic v. Mustapha Abdul-Hamid & Nine Others (CR/0603/2025), a case before the Criminal High Court in Accra, in which the accused are charged with conspiracy to extort more than GH¢291 million and related offences in the petroleum sector.
