= E-levy (Ghana) =

Tax bill in Ghana

Electronic Transaction Levy (commonly known as Electronic Levy or E-levy) is a tax applied on transactions made on electronic or digital platforms.

== Proposal ==
On 17 November 2021, Ken Ofori-Atta said the Government of Ghana decided to tax all electronic transactions in the informal sector to cover the tax net. He made this known in the 2022 budget statement and economic policy that was read in the parliament of Ghana. 1.75% is the rate of the E-levy which the Government decided to apply on all transactions. Ken Ofori-Atta said it could raise about $1.15billion which will widen the tax net. According to John Kumah, the money generated from the levy would be used for the payments of contractors in Ghana. Also, revenue from the levy would be used to support entrepreneurship, cyber and digital security; road infrastructure and provide jobs to about 11million people in the country. The Government of Ghana said that the introduction of the levy was due to the rise of the use of digital platforms for transactions because of the COVID-19 pandemic.

=== Transactions ===
It was proposed the E-levy would cover the following transactions:

- All inward remittances (which would be paid by the recipient)
- All person-to-person (P2P) mobile transactions (which includes sending of funds to another account, payment for goods and services, payment of utilities
- All POS/Merchant payments.

== Controversy ==
Some Ghanaians were against the levy claiming it does not serve the interest of common people.

Some economists asked for the proposal to be reversed, claiming that it will jeopardize the government's digitalization efforts and plans to introduce the digital currency.

Haruna Iddrisu said the Minority in Parliament would not support the E-levy claiming it seeks to take away the money of a bigger proportion of Ghanaians in multiple phases.

In December 2021, brawl broke out in the Parliament of Ghana as some MPs of NDC and NPP started punching, ripping shirts, kicks and head-butting each other due to the disagreement of the E-levy bill.

Casiel Ato Forson claimed minority in parliament would reject the E-levy proposal. Kojo Oppong Nkrumah claimed changes were made the E-levy bill after consultations were held, and would be passed when Alban Bagbin is presiding.

Joseph Osei Owusu adjourned sitting of parliament without the passage of the bill into an Act.

Asiedu Nketiah has presented some E-Levy alternatives. The measures, he claims, will exacerbate the deficit that will be produced if the government abandons the contentious electronic transfer levy.

Shatta Wale, a dancehall musician, has weighed in on Ghana's contentious E-vey bill, which has been trending for weeks. According to him, lawmakers that are eager to introduce the electronic transaction tax are unconcerned about Ghanaians' plight.

== Developments ==
MTN and AirtelTigo decided to reduce about 25% on their person-to-person mobile money transfer charges should the levy be passed.

E-levy has been passed by parliament and will take effect from 1st May, 2022. Despite the passage of E-levy, the minority in Ghana's parliament are set to challenge it, at the supreme court. According to them the passage of E-levy is illegal because parliament lacked the required numbers to do so.

== Abolition ==
The National Democratic Congress (Ghana) campaigned before the 2024 Ghanaian general election to scrap the E-levy when voted into power.

On March 11, 2025, the finance minister, Cassiel Ato Forson, announced during the 2025 budget presentation that his government will scrap the E-levy in fulfilment of their campaign promise.

On April 2, 2025, President John Mahama assented the bill to repeal E-levy, Betting tax and Others.
