= Crime in Ghana =

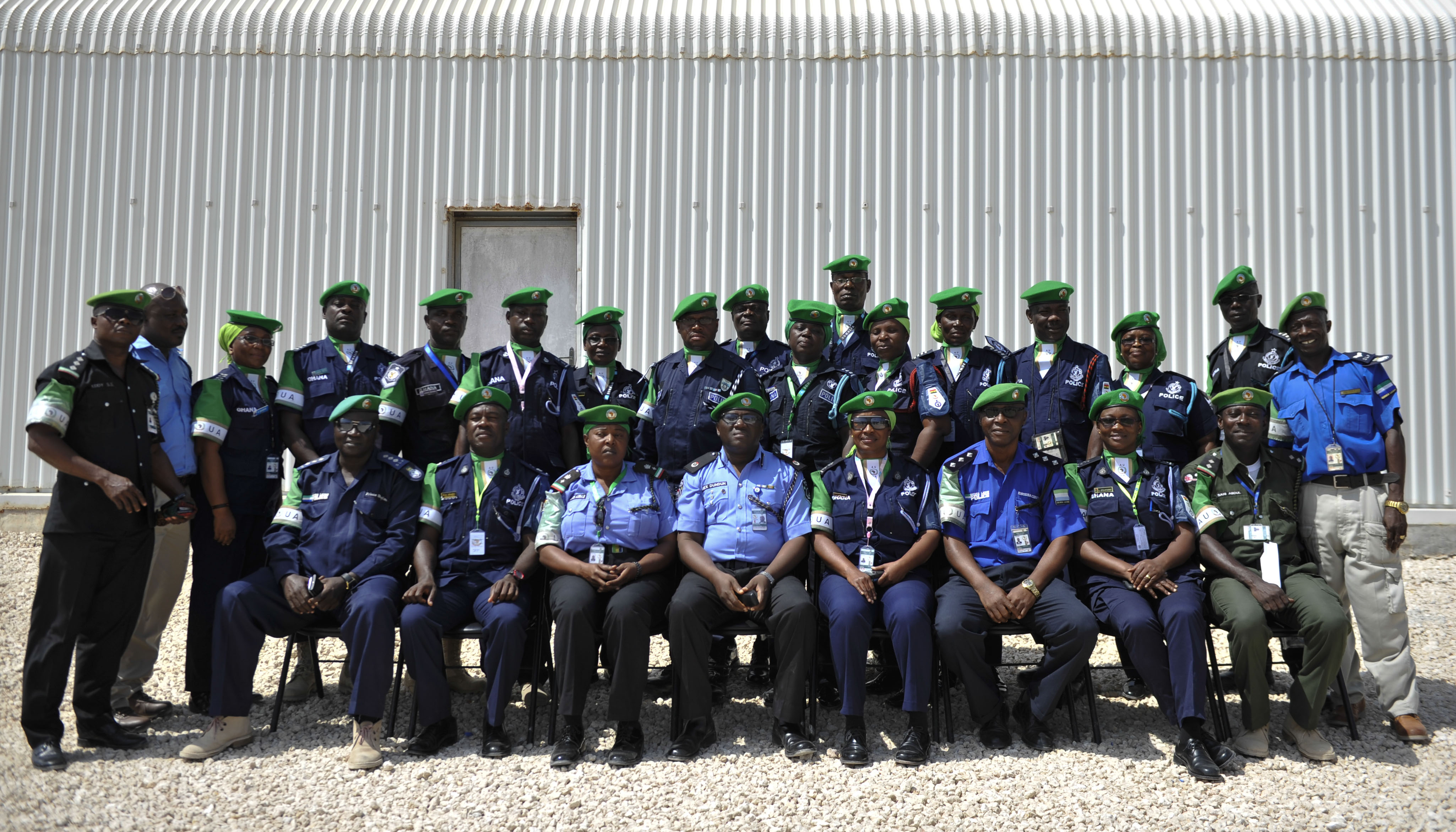
Officers of the Ghana Police Service.

Crime in Ghana is investigated by the Ghana Police Service. Ghana has a low crime rate.

== Crime by type ==
=== Murder ===
Ghana had a murder rate of 1.68 per 100,000 population in 2011.

=== Human trafficking ===
Ghana is a country of origin, transit, and destination for women and children subjected to trafficking in persons, specifically forced labor and forced prostitution. The nonconsensual exploitation of Ghanaian citizens, particularly children, is more common than the trafficking of foreign migrants. The movement of internally trafficked children is either from rural to urban areas, or from one rural area to another, as from farming to fishing communities.

Ghanaian boys and girls are subjected to conditions of forced labor within Ghana in fishing, domestic servitude, street hawking, begging, portering, and agriculture. Ghanaian girls, and to a lesser extent boys, are subjected to commercial sexual exploitation within Ghana.

Women and girls from China, Nigeria, Côte d'Ivoire, and Burkina Faso have been subjected to forced prostitution after arriving in Ghana. Citizens from other West African countries are subjected to forced labor in Ghana in agriculture or involuntary domestic servitude. Trafficking victims endure extremes of harsh treatment, including long hours, debt bondage, lack of pay, physical risks, and sexual abuse.

=== Domestic violence ===
Domestic violence is prevalent in Ghana, owing in part to a deep cultural belief that it is socially acceptable for men to discipline their wives physically. Around one in three women in Ghana experience domestic violence.

In 2007 the Ghanaian government created the Domestic Violence Act in an attempt to reduce violence against women. The act encountered significant resistance from cultural conservatives and local religious leaders who believed that such a law would undermine traditional African values, and that Western values were being implemented into law.

=== Illegal mining ===
Galamseyers are illegal gold miners. Their activities have depleted Ghana's forest cover and caused water pollution, due to the crude and unregulated nature of the mining process. In 2017, Operation Vanguard was launched to curb illegal artisanal mining in Ghana.

=== Fraud ===
Sakawa is a Ghanaian term for illegal practices which combine modern Internet-based fraud with African traditionalist rituals. The rituals, which are mostly in the form of sacrifices, are intended to spiritually manipulate victims so that the scammer's fraud is successful.

== See also ==
- Law enforcement in Ghana
