= Zebilla (Ghana parliament constituency) =

Constituency in Ghana

Coordinates: 10.91667°N 0.51667°W

- constituency for the Parliament of Ghana
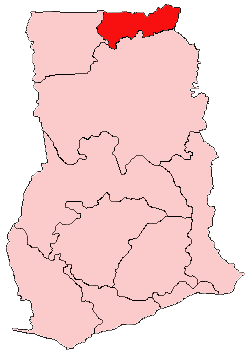
- District: Bawku West District
- Region: Upper East Region of Ghana

Current constituency
- Created: 2004
- Party: National Democratic Congress
- MP: Ebenezer Alumire Ndebilla

Zebilla is one of the constituencies represented in the Parliament of Ghana. It elects one Member of Parliament (MP) by the first past the post system of election. Ebenezer Alumire Ndebilla is the member of parliament for the constituency. Zebilla is located in the Bawku West district of the Upper East Region of Ghana.

== Boundaries ==
The seat is located within the Bawku West District in the Upper East Region of Ghana.

== Members of Parliament ==
Election	Member	Party	Term
1965	Awani Akuguri	Convention People's Party	1965-1966
1969	Ayamba Atia	National Alliance of Liberals	1969‐1972
1979	Agbango G. Akeya	People's National Convention	1979-1981
2004	John Akparibo Ndebugre	People's National Convention	2004-2008
2008	Cletus Apul Avoka	National Democratic Congress	2008-2016
2016	Frank Fuseini Adongo	New Patriotic Party	2016-2020
2020	Cletus Apul Avoka	National Democratic Congress	2020-2024
2024	Ebenezer Alumire Ndebilla	National Democratic Congress	2024-date

== Elections ==
2008 Ghanaian parliamentary election: Zebilla Source:Ghana Home Page
Party	Candidate	Votes	%	±%
National Democratic Congress	Cletus Apul Avoka	13,074	40.6	
New Patriotic Party	Appiah Moses Abaare	10,470	32.5	
Independent	John Akparibo Ndebugre	6,701	20.8	
Independent	Sulley Awanni Agholisi	1,461	4.5	
Convention People's Party	Azumah Yusif Ndago	273	0.8	
Democratic People's Party	Atiah Kudugu	236	0.7	
Majority		2,604	8.1	—
Turnout				—

== See also ==
- List of Ghana Parliament constituencies
