= Martin Amidu =

Ghanaian politician

Hon. Martin A. B. K. Amidu

21st Attorney General and Minister for Justice
- In office Jan 2011 – Jan 2012
- President: John Atta Mills
- Preceded by: Betty Mould-Iddrisu
- Succeeded by: Benjamin Kunbuor

Minister for Interior
- In office Jan 2010 – Jan 2011
- President: John Atta Mills
- Preceded by: Cletus Avoka
- Succeeded by: Benjamin Kunbuor

Special Prosecutor
- In office Jan 2018 – Nov 2020
- Preceded by: New
- Succeeded by: Kissi Agyebeng

Personal details
- Born: Martin Alamisi Burnes Kaiser Amidu
- Party: National Democratic Congress
- Education: University of Ghana; Ghana School of Law; Antioch University
- Website: www.martinamidu.com

Martin Alamisi Burns Kaiser Amidu is a Ghanaian politician and lawyer who served as Attorney General and Minister for Justice in Ghana from 2011 to 2012 and then as the First Special Prosecutor of the country from 2018 until his resignation in 2020, citing political interference by the President, Nana Akufo-Addo. He is also known for introducing the word ‘gargantuan‘, into the body politics of Ghana, when he opened investigations in the Woyome scandal which was one of the highest profiled corruption cases at the time. On 11 January 2018, Martin A.B.K Amidu was named by the President of Ghana as the Special Prosecutor for the newly created Office of the Special Prosecutor. Nana Akufo-Addo touted his anti-corruption fights as Attorney General and a private citizen as reasons for choosing Mr. Amidu, his one-time political adversary.

== Deputy Attorney-General ==
Amidu served as the Deputy Attorney-General for about the last 4 years as the Special Prosecutor. Amidu is a member of the National Democratic Congress(NDC) After civilian rule was established in the Fourth Republic in January 1993, he continued to serve in the government of Jerry Rawlings as Deputy Attorney-General. This he did for both terms, lasting eight years until January 2001.

== December 2000 presidential election ==
In the December 2000 presidential elections, he stood as the running mate of John Atta Mills. They both lost to President John Kufuor that year.

== Mills government ==
=== Minister for Interior ===
In January 2010, following a cabinet reshuffle, President Mills replaced Cletus Avoka with Amidu, as the Minister for Interior. As Amidu is a Builsa, some people raised questions as to his neutrality in dealing with the Bawku conflict. He however went successfully through vetting by the Parliament of Ghana and assumed his post.

=== Attorney General ===
Following the second major cabinet reshuffle by President Mills, Amidu became the Attorney General and Minister for Justice of Ghana.

==== Removal from Office ====
Martin Amidu was relieved of his post on Thursday, January 19, 2012, by President John Evans Atta Mills under circumstances described by aids as 'his misconduct' at a meeting chaired by the president at the Castle on January 18, 2012. He made allegations related to alleged financial impropriety on the part of another cabinet minister, allegations he was asked by the president to substantiate. Martin Amidu, the former Attorney General single-handedly challenged the legality of the payments after being relieved of his post at the Supreme Court. The Supreme Court in 2014 ordered Mr. Woyome to pay back the money as Supreme Court judges unanimously granted the Attorney-General clearance to execute the court's judgment, ordering Mr. Woyome to refund the cash to the state. Following the delays in retrieving the money, Mr. Amidu in 2016, filed an application at the Supreme Court seeking to examine Alfred Woyome, on how he would pay back the money, after the Attorney General's office under the Mahama Administration, led by the former Minister for Justice, Marietta Brew Appiah-Oppong, discontinued a similar application. In February 2017 however, Mr. Amidu withdrew his suit seeking an oral examination, explaining that the change of government under the New Patriotic Party under His Excellency the President, Nana Addo Dankwah Akuffo Addo and his Attorney General, Miss Gloria Akuffo's assurance to retrieve all judgment debts wrongfully paid to individuals. Mr. Woyome in response, prayed the Supreme Court to stay proceedings on the oral examination since he had filed for a review on the case. His lawyer, Ken Anku, argued that, his client will face an irreparable damage if the oral examination is allowed to take place but the deputy Attorney General, Godfred Dame, opposed the application.

== Special Prosecutor ==
He was Ghana's first Special prosecutor nominated for parliament's approval. The nomination was announced by the President of Ghana Nana Akufo-Addo on January 11, 2018. Martin A.B.K. Amidu was sworn into office on Friday, February 23, 2018, by President Nana Addo Dankwa Akufo-Addo at the Flagstaff House.

Amidu at the swearing in ceremony thanked the Attorney General and the President for appointing him, and promised to fight corruption in the country without fear or favour.

=== Martin A. B. K. Amidu Resigns as a Special Prosecutor ===
Mr. Martin A. B. K. Amidu announced his resignation as a special Prosecutor on the 16 of November, 2020. Mr Amidu cited political interference by his appointer, President Nana Akufo-Addo for his decision. He said in a letter to the President that his (Akufo-Addo's) reaction and meddling in an investigation he was carrying out "convinces me beyond every reasonable doubt that you had laboured under the mistaken belief that I could hold the Office of Special Prosecutor as poodle”. He added that he was resigning because of “the lack of respect of the independence of his office.” He added that, the reaction received from the presidency in respect of the analysis of the risk of corruption and anti-corruption assessment of the Agyapa Royalties limited transaction, was the final push that led him to resign. He indicated that his decision is to enable Akufo-Addo “to take steps to appoint a replacement to that position as required by law.”

He resigned as the Special prosecutor on 16 November 2020.

== See also ==
- List of Mills government ministers

Party political offices
Preceded by John Atta Mills	National Democratic Congress Vice presidential candidate 2000	Succeeded by Muhammad Mumuni
Political offices
Preceded by Cletus Avoka	Minister for Interior; 2010 – 2011	Succeeded by Benjamin Kunbuor
Preceded by Betty Mould-Iddrisu	Attorney General and Minister for Justice; 2011 – 2012	Succeeded by Benjamin Kunbuor
