= Mustapha Abdul-Hamid =

Ghanaian politician

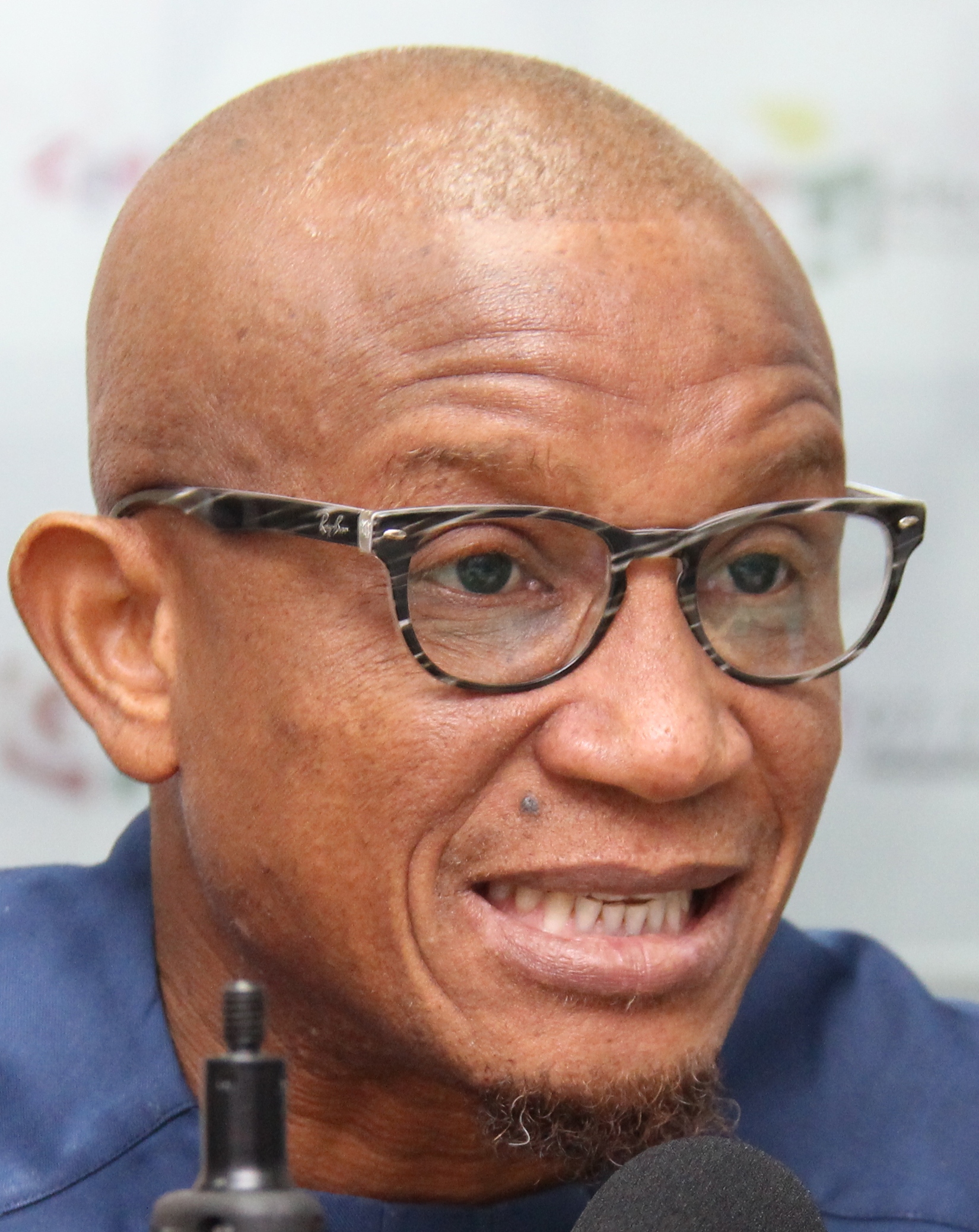

CEO of National Petroleum Authority
- Incumbent
- Assumed office June 2021
- President: Nana Akufo-Addo

Personal details
- Born: 14 June 1971 (age 55)
- Party: New Patriotic Party
- Children: 7
- Website: mustaphahamid.com

Mustapha Abdul-Hamid is a Ghanaian politician and lecturer. He is a former chief executive officer of the National Petroleum Authority (NPA).

== Early life and education ==
Mustapha Abdul-Hamid was born in the Northern Regional capital of Tamale on 14 June 1971 to Hamidu Yakubu and Adama Musah. Hamidu Yakubu was a soldier with the 6th Battalion of Infantry in Tamale. Adama Musah is a retired teacher who taught in various schools around the Tamale metropolis. He attended the Station Experimental Primary School in Tamale from 1976 to 1982. He then went to Bawku Secondary School for his Ordinary Level from 1982 to 1987. Mustapha Abdul-Hamid entered Tamale Secondary School in 1987 for his Advanced level. In 1991, he entered the University of Cape Coast to pursue a Bachelor of Arts course with English Language, Classics and Religious Studies. He eventually majored in Religious Studies, obtaining a Second Class, Upper Division. He also pursued a Diploma in Education concurrently with the Degree program. He obtained an MPhil in Religious Studies from the University of Cape Coast in 2003. In September 2017, he completed and was awarded a PhD in Religious Studies by the University of Cape Coast. Mustapha Abdul-Hamid's research interests are in the area of Islamic Mysticism, Political Thought in Islam, Islam and Gender and Islam in Ghana. He has published extensively in reputable journals around the world. Some of his publications include, "Religious Language and the Charge of Blasphemy: In Defense of Al-Hallaj," and "Christian-Muslim Relations in Ghana: A Model for World Dialogue and Peace." Mustapha Abdul-Hamid showed an early interest and capacity for debate. In Bawku Secondary School where he had his Ordinary Level education and at Tamale Secondary School where he had his Advance level education, he was a member of the Debating Teams of both schools. He is a faithful adherent of Islam and before being Minister for Inner City and Zongo Development, was already very much involved in Islamic activities in Muslim communities across the country. During his student days at the University of Cape Coast, he was President of the Ghana Muslim Students Association and the Students Representative Council. His devotion to Islam is based on the training he received by his father. As early as age 7, Mustapha was already a muezzin for the neighbourhood mosque where they both worshiped. Mustapha's parents divorced when he was about four years old. His father took custody of him according to both Islamic and Northern tradition. In Islamic tradition, in particular, fathers are required to take custody of their male children in the event of a divorce, if they have attained the age of two. And so his father brought him up by strict military discipline. He is married and has seven kids.

== Career and political life ==
Mustapha Abdul-Hamid has worked in various capacities as a Strategy Planning Manager and Client Service Manager with various Advertising and Marketing Companies such as the Media Majique and Research Systems and Ghana Advertising and Marketing Company. He also worked with and edited newspapers such as the defunct High Street Journal and the Daily Statesman. He was also the News Editor at Choice FM, a radio station based in Accra whose frequency was eventually sold to the Dr. Kwabena Duffuor media group and has now become Kasapa FM. Hamid is the former minister for information. Before his appointment as minister for information in March 2017, he was a lecturer at the Department of Religion and Human Values of the University of Cape Coast. Mustapha Abdul-Hamid's career as a politician began in 1991, when he entered the University of Cape Coast. At that time, the military government of the Provisional National Defense Council (PNDC), headed by Flight Lieutenant (retired) Jerry John Rawlings, had hinted that it was to lift the ban on party political activity in May 1992. Groups which intended to form political parties after the lifting of the ban therefore began to congregate. The group that in Ghana's political history had been associated with the Danquah-Dombo-Busia tradition, formed what they called at the time, the Danquah-Busia Club. It was founded in the house of Stephen Krakue at East Legon in Accra. The man who was responsible for planting the club in the Central Region was a senior figure in the tradition called Lawyer Spio. It was he who began the process of recruiting young men and women at the University of Cape Coast to form the nucleus of the club. Mustapha Abdul-Hamid was among the first batch of young men who were recruited to start the party's University of Cape Coast branch.
