= Bawku West District =

District in Upper East region, Ghana

- District
- Districts of Upper East Region

- Location of Bawku West District within Upper East
- Coordinates: 10°56′16.44″N 0°28′51.24″W
- Country: Ghana
- Region: Upper East
- Capital: Zebilla

Government
  - District Executive: Hon. Victoria Ayamba

Area
  - Total: 979 km^{2} (378 sq mi)

Population (2021)
  - Total: 144,189
  - Density: 1.83/km^{2} (4.7/sq mi)
- Time zone: UTC+0 (GMT)
- ISO 3166 code: GH-UE-BW

Bawku West District is one of the fifteen districts in Upper East Region, Ghana. Originally created as an ordinary district assembly in 1988; which was established by Legislative Instrument (L.I.) 1442. The municipality is located in the eastern part of Upper East Region and has Zebilla as its capital town.

== History ==
Bawku West is part of the traditional kingdom of Kusaug. Kusasi is the main ethnic group and Kusaal is the main language spoken in the area. As the Kusasi kingdom of Kusaug, it is much older.

== Geography ==
It is bordered to the north by the Republic of Burkina Faso, to the east by Binduri District, to the west by Talensi District and Nabdam District and to the south by East Mamprusi District. The district covers an area of approximately 1,070 square kilometres, which constitutes about 12% of the total land area of the Upper East Region. It is the fourth biggest district in the region in terms of land area.

== Demographics ==
According to the 2010 population and housing census, the total population is 94,034 representing 9.0 percent of the region's total population. Males constitute 48 percent and females represent 52 percent of the district's population. Of the population 11 years and above, 39.0 percent are literate and 61.0 percent are non-literate. The proportion of literate males is higher (48.0%) than that of females (31.0%). that time. Kusaal is the dominant language in Zebilla. The majority of the inhabitants of the district are Kussasi, but there are also numerous Bissa and Mossi from the adjacent kingdoms. Zebilla, like many other places in Northern part of Ghana has very shallow soil which is less rich in organic fertilizer. The weather conditions are harsh with little rainfall. Major crops that thrive well in the area are maize, sorghum, 'Nara', rice, soya beans, bambara beans and groundnut. Joy News reported that, a man called Apamsaiblik Azurago, 'defied the odds' and cultivated the first ever cocoa in the area.

== Economics ==
Goods and commodity trading occur every three days in an open market in Zebilla. The same occurs in smaller townships like Sapeliga on the Burkina Faso border. The Zebilla market is at the district capital and it is the largest market in the district. There are other smaller markets like the Binaba market which is at Binaba zone, Tanga market which is at the Tanga zone, Sapeliga Market, at the Sapeliga Market. The smaller markets come a day after or every other day after Zebilla market day. Zebilla is noted for animal production. Guinea fowls, sheep, goat and dogs are mostly sold every market day. Dog meat is a delicacy among the traditional Kusasi people. Dogs are sold in open place every in all the small markets and people from the regional capital, Bolga come to all these places to buy them and process as a delicacy.

== Sources ==
- "Districts of Ghana". Statoids.
- Zebilla
