= Ghana Revenue Authority =

Ghanaian tax institution

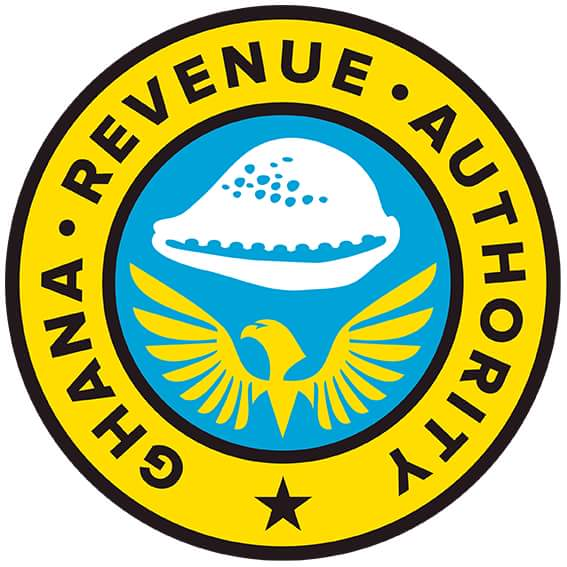
- Ghana Revenue Authority 0537161294 (GRA)

Agency overview
- Formed: 2009; 17 years ago
- Preceding agencies: Internal Revenue Service; Value Added Tax Service; Customs Excise and Preventive Service; Revenue Agencies Governing Board
- Headquarters: Off Starlets' 91 Road, near Accra Sports Stadium; 5°33′03″N 0°11′40″W
- Motto: Integrity, Fairness and Service
- Agency executives: Ms. Julie Essiam, AG. Commissioner – General; Ms. Pearl Nana Ama Darko, AG. Commissioner – Support Service Division; Brigadier General Ziblim Bawa Ayorrogo, AG. Commissioner – Customs Division; Mr. Edward Gyambrah, Officer-in-Charge, Domestic Tax Revenue Division
- Parent agency: Ministry of Finance
- Website: www.gra.gov.gh

The Ghana Revenue Authority(GRA) is the Ghana administration charged with the task of assessing, collecting, and accounting for tax revenue in Ghana.

As part of efforts to improve compliance, the Authority is required to assist taxpayers to understand and meet their tax obligations by providing robust and comprehensive advice.

Since its inception, the GRA has integrated the four revenue institutions ,namely the Customs, Excise and Preventive Service (CEPS), the Internal Revenue Service (IRS), the Value Added Tax Service (VATS), and the Revenue Agencies Governing Board (RAGB)".

== History ==
In December 2009, the four revenue agencies that is Customs, Excise and Preventive Service (CEPS), Internal Revenue Service (IRS), Value Added Tax (VAT) Service and Revenue Agencies Governing Board(RAGB) Secretariat were merged in accordance with the Ghana Revenue Authority Act, 2009 (Act 791). GRA thus replaces the revenue agencies in the administration of taxes and customs duties in the country.

The establishment of the GRA is part of the reforms in revenue administration of tax collection in Ghana which began in the mid-eighties when CEPS and IRS were taken out of the Civil Service and made semi-autonomous and self-accounting public sector institutions with separate boards. The National Revenue Secretariat (NRS) was set up to formulate revenue policies, manage tax reforms and supervise the activities of CEPS and IRS.

In 1998, the VAT Service was established to administer VAT and other consumption taxes. RAGB also began operations in 2001 to supervise and monitor the operations of the revenue agencies. In 2002, the Taxpayer Identification Number (TIN) was introduced to enhance information interchange and risk profiling. Then in 2004, the Large Taxpayer Unit (LTU) was set up to operate on functional lines as a pilot programme for the future integration of tax administration in Ghana as well as to serve the needs of large taxpayers as a one-stop-shop operation.

It was envisaged that the integration of the revenue agencies will bring the following benefits to taxpayers and the revenue administration.

- Reduced administrative and tax compliance cost
- Better service delivery
- Improved departmental information flow
- Holistic approach to domestic tax and customs administration
- Enhanced revenue mobilisation.

The Ghana Revenue Authority announced in April 2022 that it will begin collecting value added taxes (VAT) from non-resident companies or persons that conduct business transactions in Ghana via the electronic transmission of data over communications networks like the internet.

== Organizational structure ==
A nine-member(9) governing board of directors, consisting of both public and private sector experts, makes policy decisions to be implemented by GRA Management. The Board also makes recommendations to the Minister of Finance on tax policy, reform and legislation.

The chairman of the Board as well as the chief executive officer of the Authority called the Commissioner-General are appointed by the President of the Republic of Ghana https://gra.gov.gh/customs/. The Authority has three main divisions, namely Customs Division (CD) which are the customs, Domestic Tax Revenue Division (DTRD) which include The Audits, The Tax Force, etc. and Support Services Division (SSD) which are the Administration, IT, Account, etc. which are all headed by

== Functions ==
The Ghana Revenue Authority has been charged to perform amongst others, the following functions as enacted by Act 791:

- Assess and collect taxes, interest and penalties on taxes due to the state with optimum efficiency;
- Pay the amounts collected into the Consolidated Fund
- Promote tax compliance and tax education;
- Combat tax fraud and evasion and co-operate to that effect with other competent law enforcement agencies and revenue agencies in other countries;
- Advise District Assemblies on the assessment and collection of their revenue;
- Prepare and publish reports and statistics related to its revenue collection;
- Make recommendations to the Minister on revenue collection policy

== GRA informant award scheme ==
The Ghana Revenue Authority is reminding the public about their informant award scheme, where individuals can receive rewards for providing information that aids in tax recovery.

The information should reveal various illicit activities, including tax underreporting, smuggling or diversion of goods, invoice manipulation, failure to provide VAT invoices, record tampering/fabrication, failure to register for taxes, and similar violations.

In December 2022, Through the effective implementation of its Informant Reward Scheme (IRS), the Ghana Revenue Authority (GRA) managed to recover more than $93 million from multinational and local companies operating within the country.

== Tax policy environment ==
Tax revenue generation is based on clearly defined tax policy measures. GRA remains a key partner of the Tax Policy Unit of the Ministry of Finance and Economic Planning (Ghana). This collaboration which is complemented by tapping the expertise of stakeholders drawn across several economic and social sectors is geared toward the formulation of effective and sustainable policies designed to enhance tax revenue collection by the Authority.

== Taxpayers ==
Taxpayers registered with GRA are segmented into three identifiable groups that is Large, Medium and Small based on defined criteria. Taxpayers with an annual turnover of over GH¢5 million are classified as large taxpayers. This category also includes specialist industries irrespective of their turnover. These are upstream and midstream petroleum companies, banking institutions, insurance companies, mining companies and quarries, and members of groups of companies where at least one member qualifies as a large taxpayer.

Taxpayers within the turnover bracket of GH¢90,000 up to GH¢5 million are categorized as medium taxpayers, while those with an annual turnover of less than GH¢90,000 are classified as small taxpayers.

The GRA announced that from 1 April 2022, it will no longer accept manual tax returns from specified group of taxpayers but instead, returns will have to be filed through the taxpayers portal from the effective date.

== Tax Types ==
There are various taxes that taxpayers are required to pay. These are grouped into two main headings under the Domestic Tax types. These are the Individual Tax Types and the Business Tax Types.

=== Individual Tax Types ===
These are

- Pay As You Earn (PAYE)
- Personal Income Tax (PIT)
- Vehicle Income Tax (VIT)
- Rent Income Tax
- Tax Stamp
- Gift Tax
- Capital Gains Tax
- Stamp Duty

=== Business Tax Types ===
These are

- Value Added Tax
- Corporate Income Tax (CIT)
- Withholding Tax (WHT)
- Rent Tax
- Communications Service Tax (CST)
- Excise Tax Stamp
- Excise Duty
- Stamp Duty
- Mineral Royalties Tax
- Business Tax

=== Others ===
Importers and Exporter are expected to pay customs duty at the various ports and centres

== Introduction of Uni-Pass clearance system ==
On 21 February 2020, personnel and logistics were distributed by the Customs Division, to test the Uni-Pass clearance system at the Takoradi Port. This system handles all paperwork and payments at one point, an improvement on the previous system, which processed all the operations in several offices. This was after its successful implementation at the Aflao Collection Point in the Volta Region.

== Amendments of tax laws ==
The Ghana Revenue Authority has announced the implementation of amendments to several tax laws, notifying the general public that these changes are now in effect.

The GRA has acknowledged that businesses have been given ample time to make necessary system adjustments ahead of tax implementation since the law was enacted.

Electronic Transfer Levy (Amendment) Act 2022 (Act 1089)

1. On electronic transactions subject to the Act's charges, the Electronic Transfer Levy (E-Levy) rate has been lowered to 1%.
2. The way, when, and location that E-levy returns are filed will be decided by the Commissioner-General.
3. Within 24 hours of charging the amount, the levy must be remitted to the Commissioner-General.
4. The individual must be enrolled with the GRA to meet the Act's requirements for agent eligibility.
1. Revenue Administration (Amendment) Act, 2022 (Act 1086)
1. The Act grants the Commissioner-General the authority to set up a monitoring system to confirm the real revenue received by a taxpayer to calculate taxes due.
2. In addition to other penalties under the Act, it imposes a penalty of 5% of yearly gross revenue on anyone who refuses to give the Commissioner-General or a tax officer physical access to their system, infrastructure, or network node.
3. With regard to the production of or access to a document, this amendment supersedes existing provisions in other enactments that deal with secrecy, privilege, or the public interest.
4. According to the Act, anybody who realizes an asset or a liability must also file a separate return.
1. Value Added Tax (Amendment) No. 2 Act, 2022 (Act 1087)
1. Value Added Tax (VAT) rates rising from 12.5% to 15%
2. Examining the transitional measures to enable the Commissioner-General to choose the appropriate circumstances in which a taxable person should make use of the Certified Invoicing System (E-VAT).
3. For non-compliance, it also offers further administrative sanctions.
4. To exclude gambling, gaming, and other chance-based activities from VAT.
5. The abolition of VAT exemptions on imported textbooks, imported newspapers, architectural plans and similar designs, drawings, scientific and technical works, periodicals, magazines, trade catalogues, price lists, greeting cards, almanacs, calendars, diaries, stationery, and other printed matter. All amendments will come into effect on 21 January 2023

== Partnerships ==
=== Myassembly.gov.gh ===
From the year 2023, GRA partnered with the Metropolitan, Municipal and District Assemblies (MMDAs) in the collection of property rates in the country using a Unified Common Property Rate Platform. This Unified Common Property Rate Platform also known as MYASSEMBLY.GOV.GH is a complete end-to-end district revenue collection and administration platform designed to enhance the collection and accounting of property rates.

The partnership will see the tax authority receive 30 percent of the property revenue mobilization to cover for systems, logistics and other financial overheads accrued and will credit the 70 percent to the respective MMDAs. This new partnership seeks to raise not less than 1.77 billion Ghana Cedis yearly.

Aside conducting training for the various assembly staff across the country, a total of 5000 Technical Support Officers (TSOs) and Client Support Officers (CSOs) were deployed in the late first quarter of the year 2023 by the GRA to assist property rate payers in the various MMDAs across the country to register and pay their property rates.

==== Petition against GRA over assembly.gov.gh activities ====
In July 2023, the Chamber of Local Governance (ChaLoG) petitioned the Economic and Organized Crime Office (EOCO) to investigate what it termed an illegal lodgment of government funds into the account of a private company—Digital City Solutions Limited (DCS). ChaLoG alleged that GRA is being used a decoy by DCS for the collection of property rate tax. They maintained such an act was in contravention of the Financial Administration Act, 2003 (ACT 654) and the Financial Management Regulations, 2019 (L.I 2378).

ChaLoG stated categorically that their investigation "revealed that the myassembly.gov.gh payment platform account is on the contrary, being managed by DCS and not GRA".

== The Leadership ==
=== Commissioners ===
Names	Position	Date
Ms. Julie Essiam	Commissioner-General	2024 – date
Mr. Edward Gyambrah	Domestic Tax and Revenue Division	2023 – date
Brigadier General Ziblim Bawa Ayorrogo	Commissioner Customs Division	2024 – date
Ms. Pearl Nana Ama Darko	Commissioner Support Services Division	2024 – date

=== Governing Board ===
Names	Position
Hon. Joe Ghartey (MP)	Chairman of the Governing Board
Ms. Julie Essiam	Member
Madam Susana Akomea	Member
Hon. Okyere Baafi (MP)	Member
Mrs. Elsie Addo Awadzi	Member
Mr. Kwabena Abankwah Yeboah	Member
Mrs. Araba Bosomtwe	Member
Hon. Alhassan Abdakkah Iddi (MP)	Member
Dr. Alex Ampaabeng	Member

== See also ==
E-levy
