= Bureau of National Investigations =

Internal intelligence agency of Ghana

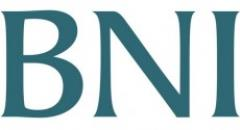
- Abbreviation: BNI
- Established: 1996; 30 years ago
- Legal status: Active
- Purpose: Cyberwarfare; Counterintelligence; Internal security; Intelligence agency; Security agency
- Region served: Ghana
- Affiliations: Ministry of National Security Ghana, Presidency of Ghana
- Budget: undisclosed
- Staff: undisclosed

The National Intelligence Bureau (NIB), formally known as Bureau of National Investigations (BNI), is the internal intelligence agency of Ghana. The NIB is an integral part of the National Security Council which oversees matters of the counterintelligence and internal security of Ghana. The NIB has investigative jurisdiction to arrest or detain and interrogate over a wide range of criminal offenses.

Among the duties of the National Intelligence Bureau are dealing with organized crime and financial crime, espionage, sabotage, terrorism, hijacking, piracy, drug trafficking and providing intelligence to counter threats to Ghana's national security and also perform such other functions as may be directed by the President or the council. The BNI is legally a creature of, The Security and Intelligence Agencies Act (Act 526) 1996, having been continued in existence by Section 10 of that Act. The NIB has undisclosed offices in all the sixteen regions of Ghana . In November 2020 the name was officially changed to the National Intelligence Bureau.

== History ==
During Ghana's decolonization, it obtained India's help in setting up two intelligence services: The Foreign Service Research Bureau (external intelligence) and the Special Branch (domestic intelligence).

== Organization ==
The Bureau of National Investigations, previously known as the "Special Branch", is a counterintelligence and internal security agency, composed of civilian personnel whose role is to establish close surveillance over opponents of the Republic of Ghana and the Government of Ghana. The BNI has power to interrogate and detain people whom they suspect of subversion without trial indefinitely, on grounds of national security of the Republic of Ghana. The BNI has overriding statutory authority over other security services

The organization investigates crimes of any shape or form as enshrined in the constitution of Ghana.
