= Customs Excise and Preventive Service =

Government agency

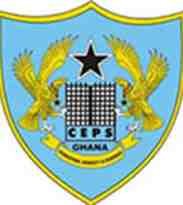

Agency overview
- Formed: 1839
- Jurisdiction: Ghana
- Headquarters: Accra, Greater Accra
- Agency executive: Mr. Isaac Crentsil, Commissioner of CEPS (Customs Excise and Preventive Service)
- Parent agency: Ministry of Finance and Economic Planning (Ghana)
- Website: gra.gov.gh

The Customs Excise and Preventive Service (CEPS) is the Government of Ghana agency responsible for the monitoring, regulation and inspection of exports into Ghana.

== History ==
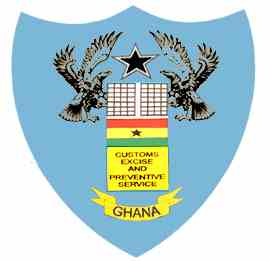
Seal of CEPS (Customs Excise and Preventive Service).

The service was established in 1839 and was under the jurisdiction of the Civil Service Department of Ghana. In 1986, the Flight Lieutenant Rawlings government made the service autonomous backed by the PNDC Law 144. The law was replaced in 1993 by the PNDC Law 330.

== Functions of the service ==
The service is mandated to collect Import and export duty tax, petroleum tax and import excise. It promotes the protection of revenue through the prevention of smuggling of goods across Ghana's borders. The service protects the boundaries of Ghana by preventing external aggression and promotes territorial integrity of Ghana. The service is a member of Ghana's security services. Import and export restrictions and prohibitions are supervised by the service.

== See also ==
- Customs
