= Foreign relations of Ghana =

The foreign relations of Ghana are controlled by the Ministry of Foreign Affairs of Ghana. Ghana is active in the United Nations and many of its specialised agencies, the World Trade Organization, the Non-Aligned Movement, the Organisation of African Unity (OAU), the African Union (AU) and the Economic Community of West African States. Ghana generally follows the consensus of the Non-aligned Movement and the OAU on economic and political issues not directly affecting its own interests. Ghana has been extremely active in international peacekeeping activities under UN auspices in Lebanon, Afghanistan, Rwanda, and the Balkans, in addition to an eight-year sub-regional initiative with its ECOWAS partners to develop and then enforce a cease-fire in Liberia. Ghana is also a member of the International Criminal Court.

== Guiding principles and objectives ==
Ghana's foreign policy since independence has been characterised by a commitment to the principles and ideals of non-alignment and Pan-Africanism as first enunciated by Kwame Nkrumah in the early 1960s. For Nkrumah, non-alignment meant complete independence from the policies and alliances of both East and West and support for a worldwide union of so-called non-aligned nations as a counter to both East and West power blocs. Pan-Africanism, by contrast, was a specifically African policy that envisioned the independence of Africa from Western colonialism and the eventual economic and political unity of the African continent.^{[1]}

The PNDC, like most of its predecessors, made serious and consistent attempts at the practical application of these ideals and principles, and its successor, the NDC government, promises to follow in the PNDC's footsteps. Under the NDC, Ghana remains committed to the principle of non-alignment in world politics. Ghana is also opposed to interference in the internal affairs of both small and large countries. This is a departure from Nkrumah's foreign policy approach; Nkrumah was frequently accused of subverting African regimes, such as Togo and Ivory Coast, which he considered ideologically conservative. The NDC government, like the PNDC before it, believes in the principle of self-determination, including the right to political independence and the right of people to pursue their economic and social development free from external interference. Another feature of NDC rule carried over from the PNDC era is faithfulness to what a leading scholar of Africa has called "one of the most successful neoclassical economic reform efforts supported by the IMF and the World Bank."

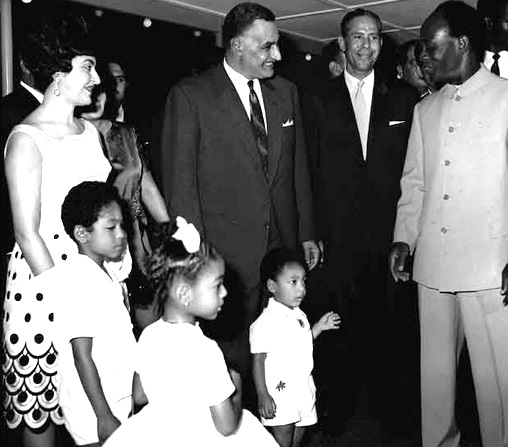
Kwame Nkrumah and his family meeting Egyptian President Gamal Abdel Nasser during the 1965 OAU Summit in Accra.

The broad objectives of Ghana's foreign policy thus include maintaining friendly relations and cooperation with all countries that desire such cooperation, irrespective of ideological considerations, on the basis of mutual respect and non-interference in each other's internal affairs. Africa and its liberation and unity are naturally the cornerstones of Ghana's foreign policy. As a founding member of the Organisation of African Unity (OAU), NDC policy is to adhere faithfully to the OAU Charter.

Another important principle of Ghana's foreign policy involves the closest possible cooperation with neighbouring countries with which the people of Ghana share cultural history, ties of blood, and economics. The results have included various bilateral trade and economic agreements and permanent joint commissions involving Ghana and its immediate neighbours, sometimes in the face of latent ideological and political differences and mutual suspicion, as well as numerous reciprocal state visits by high-ranking officials. These measures have contributed significantly to subregional cooperation, development, and the reduction of tension.

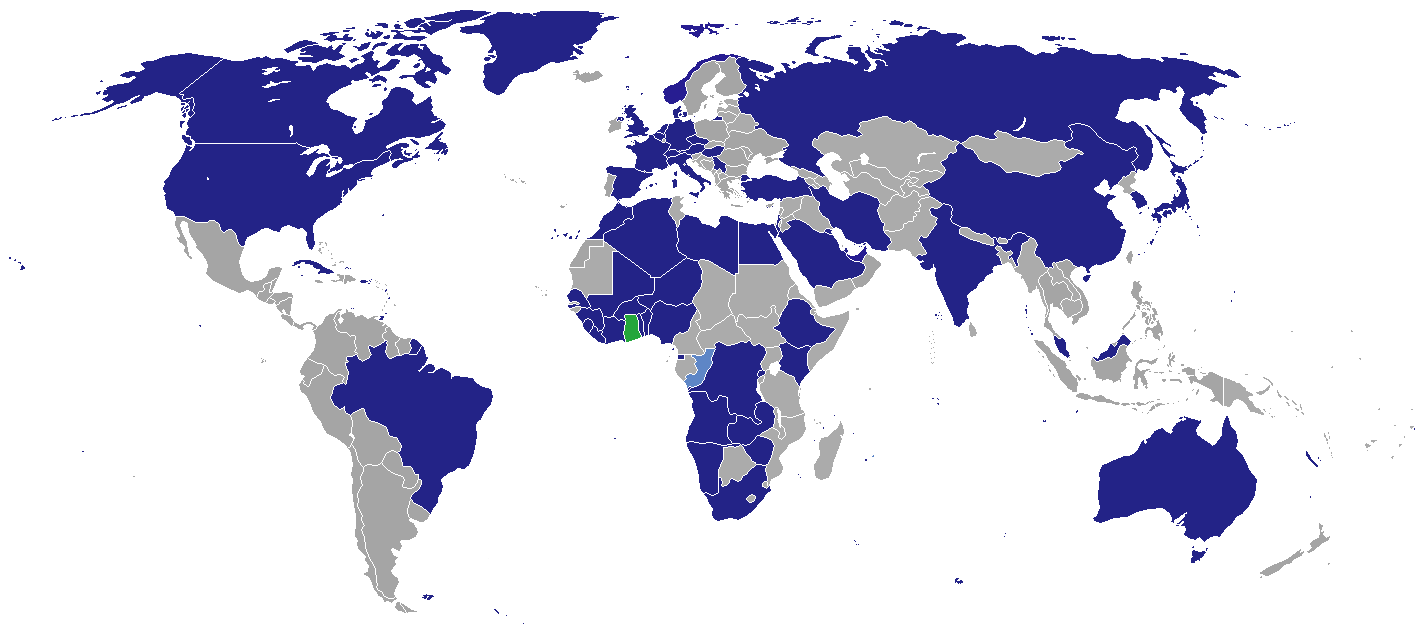
Diplomatic missions of Ghana

As an example of Ghana's interest in regional cooperation, the country enthusiastically endorsed formation of the Economic Community of West African States (ECOWAS) in 1975. This organisation was created specifically to foster inter-regional economic and political cooperation. It has served as a useful vehicle for contacts with neighbouring West African governments and for channelling increased Ghanaian exports to regional markets. Since 1990 ECOWAS has been engaged in a peacekeeping mission in Liberia to which Ghana has contributed a large contingent of troops. Ghana has participated in other international peacekeeping efforts as well, sending soldiers to operations of the United Nations (UN) in Cambodia in 1992-93 and Rwanda in 1993–94.

In August 1994, Rawlings became ECOWAS chairman, a post that had eluded him since the PNDC came to power. He immediately undertook several initiatives to reduce tensions and conflict in West Africa. Notable among them was the Akosombo Accord of 12 September, designed to end civil war in Liberia.

== Diplomatic relations ==
List of Countries which Ghana maintains diplomatic relations with:

#	Country	Date
1	United Kingdom	6 March 1957
2	India	6 March 1957
3	Japan	6 March 1957
4	Philippines	6 March 1957
5	United States	6 March 1957
6	Liberia	14 March 1957
7	France	March 1957
8	Germany	24 June 1957
9	Canada	30 October 1957
10	Israel	October 1957
11	Egypt	7 November 1957
12	Russia	15 January 1958
13	Netherlands	13 February 1958
14	Australia	21 February 1958
15	Tunisia	11 June 1958
16	Pakistan	1 September 1958
17	Turkey	30 October 1958
18	Guinea	January 1959
19	Serbia	10 January 1959
20	Lebanon	30 March 1959
21	Ethiopia	10 April 1959
22	Sudan	24 June 1959
23	Indonesia	2 September 1959
24	Cuba	23 December 1959
25	Poland	31 December 1959
26	Belgium	13 January 1960
27	Libya	1 February 1960
28	Brazil	2 March 1960
29	Saudi Arabia	30 March 1960
30	Iraq	21 April 1960
31	Morocco	3 June 1960
32	China	5 July 1960
33	Democratic Republic of the Congo	15 July 1960
34	Switzerland	19 July 1960
35	Nigeria	1 October 1960
36	Mali	14 October 1960
37	Italy	8 November 1960
38	Czech Republic	18 January 1961
39	Sri Lanka	24 January 1961
40	Somalia	25 February 1961
41	Haiti	February 1961
42	Ivory Coast	15 March 1961
43	Argentina	28 March 1961
44	Senegal	21 April 1961
45	Sierra Leone	27 April 1961
46	Burkina Faso	12 June 1961
47	Hungary	29 July 1961
48	Afghanistan	2 August 1961
49	Mexico	8 August 1961
50	Bulgaria	10 August 1961
51	Romania	10 August 1961
52	Albania	17 August 1961
53	Niger	24 August 1961
54	Denmark	28 September 1961
55	Chile	6 October 1961
56	Tanzania	4 January 1962
57	Sweden	27 April 1962
58	Benin	20 June 1962
59	Togo	21 January 1963
60	Algeria	2 May 1963
61	Uganda	1 August 1963
62	Cameroon	20 August 1963
63	Kenya	12 December 1963
64	Republic of the Congo	8 February 1964
65	Trinidad and Tobago	1 March 1964
66	Malawi	8 July 1964
67	Burundi	25 August 1964
68	Zambia	30 November 1964
69	North Korea	28 December 1964
70	Venezuela	16 March 1965
71	Vietnam	25 March 1965
72	Mauritania	6 April 1965
73	Norway	19 May 1965
74	Gambia	28 May 1965
75	Mongolia	7 December 1965
76	Rwanda	1965
77	Lesotho	24 November 1966
78	Malaysia	29 March 1967
79	Central African Republic	14 June 1967
80	Chad	23 July 1967
81	Spain	10 November 1967
82	Austria	7 December 1967
83	Luxembourg	21 February 1968
84	Jamaica	8 May 1968
85	Equatorial Guinea	4 June 1971
86	Greece	31 July 1973
87	Malta	27 February 1974
88	Iran	7 July 1974
89	Bangladesh	19 July 1974
90	Kuwait	1974
91	Portugal	27 May 1975
92	Botswana	28 October 1975
—	Holy See	20 November 1975
93	Suriname	24 November 1975
94	Angola	8 October 1976
95	Papua New Guinea	22 August 1977
96	Cape Verde	4 October 1977
97	Iceland	11 October 1977
98	South Korea	14 November 1977
99	Finland	1 December 1977
100	Bahrain	9 April 1978
101	Mozambique	27 June 1978
102	Eswatini	June 1978
103	Ecuador	12 May 1979
104	Guyana	14 May 1979
105	Zimbabwe	29 October 1980
106	Qatar	25 July 1981
107	United Arab Emirates	25 August 1981
108	Belize	September 1981
109	Gabon	September 1981
110	Uruguay	24 May 1982
111	Nicaragua	March 1983
112	Thailand	25 October 1985
113	Peru	23 June 1987
114	Bolivia	3 December 1987
115	Colombia	23 June 1988
116	Seychelles	10 October 1988
—	State of Palestine	17 February 1989
117	Panama	24 February 1989
118	Oman	1 March 1989
119	Cyprus	5 May 1989
120	Maldives	10 August 1989
121	Singapore	11 October 1989
122	Namibia	21 March 1990
123	Ireland	1990
124	Brunei	10 December 1991
125	Latvia	3 January 1992
126	Estonia	5 February 1992
127	Belarus	5 May 1992
128	Armenia	29 May 1992
129	Ukraine	17 June 1992
130	Kyrgyzstan	26 June 1992
131	Lithuania	10 July 1992
132	Kazakhstan	14 August 1992
133	Moldova	28 August 1992
134	Azerbaijan	11 September 1992
135	Turkmenistan	17 September 1992
136	Georgia	4 December 1992
137	Slovenia	15 February 1993
138	Croatia	17 February 1993
139	Saint Kitts and Nevis	June 1993
140	Slovakia	1 October 1993
141	Uzbekistan	28 October 1993
142	Tajikistan	2 November 1993
143	South Africa	6 May 1994
144	Barbados	August 1994
145	Guatemala	26 September 1994
146	Myanmar	13 January 1995
147	Cambodia	24 May 1995
148	Yemen	30 November 1995
149	North Macedonia	7 February 1996
150	New Zealand	23 June 1999
151	Costa Rica	11 July 2000
152	Timor-Leste	20 May 2002
153	Mauritius	18 August 2003
154	Eritrea	26 August 2004
155	Bahamas	12 September 2005
156	Jordan	5 June 2007
157	Saint Vincent and the Grenadines	1 August 2008
158	San Marino	5 November 2008
159	Andorra	31 March 2011
160	Honduras	29 August 2011
161	Djibouti	12 March 2012
162	Montenegro	20 September 2012
—	Kosovo	4 October 2012
163	Fiji	12 October 2012
164	Bosnia and Herzegovina	13 February 2013
165	South Sudan	15 September 2014
166	Comoros	5 July 2015
167	Dominica	18 January 2018
168	Dominican Republic	23 September 2019
169	Nepal	25 September 2019
170	Monaco	26 September 2019
171	Laos	27 September 2019
172	Liechtenstein	19 December 2019
173	Samoa	20 December 2019
174	Antigua and Barbuda	Before March 2020
175	Paraguay	17 June 2021
176	São Tomé and Príncipe	13 June 2023
177	El Salvador	18 September 2023
—	Cook Islands	8 November 2023
178	Guinea-Bissau	7 December 2023
179	Grenada	15 February 2024
180	Madagascar	24 September 2024
181	Saint Lucia	24 September 2024
182	Solomon Islands	21 September 2026
183	Syria	Unknown

== Bilateral relations ==
=== Africa ===
Country	Formal Relations Began	Notes
Burkina Faso	12 June 1961	See Burkina Faso–Ghana relations With the coming to power of Thomas Sankara in Burkina Faso in 1983, relations between Ghana and Burkina became both warm and close. Indeed, Rawlings and Sankara began discussions about uniting Ghana and Burkina in the manner of the defunct Ghana-Guinea-Mali Union, which Nkrumah had sought unsuccessfully to promote as a foundation for his dream of unified continental government. Political and economic ties between Ghana and Burkina, a poorer country, were strengthened through joint commissions of cooperation and through border demarcation committee meetings. Frequent high-level consultations and joint military exercises, meant to discourage potential dissidents and to protect young "revolutions" in each country, were fairly regular features of Ghana-Burkina relations.: Burkina Faso has an embassy in Accra.; Ghana has an embassy in Ouagadougou.
Guinea	1958	Guinea has an embassy in Accra, which was opened in 1958.; Ghana has an embassy in Conakry which is also accredited to Guinea-Bissau.
Ivory Coast	15 March 1961	See Ivory Coast–Ghana relations Both countries established diplomatic relations on 15 March 1961. Ghana-Ivory Coast relations suffered from the same ups and downs that characterised Ghana-Togo relations. In early 1984, the PNDC government complained that Ivory Coast was allowing Ghanaian dissidents to use its territory as a base from which to carry out acts of sabotage against Ghana. Ghana also accused Ivory Coast of granting asylum to political agitators wanted for crimes in Ghana. Relations between Ghana and Ivory Coast improved significantly, however, after 1988. In 1989, after fifteen years of no progress, the Ghana-Ivory Coast border re-demarcation commission finally agreed on the definition of the 640-kilometer border between the two countries. The PNDC thereafter worked to improve the transportation and communication links with both Ivory Coast and Togo, despite problems with both countries.: Ghana has an embassy in Abidjan.; Ivory Coast has an embassy in Accra.
Kenya	16 December 1963	See Ghana–Kenya relations Both countries established diplomatic relations on 16 December 1963.: Ghana has a high commission in Nairobi.; Kenya has a high commission in Accra.
Nigeria	1 October 1960	See Ghana–Nigeria relations Ghana set up a commission in 1959 when Nigeria was still a dependent territory. This was elevated to High Commission status on the attainment of Nigeria's independence on 1 October 1960 Despite close cultural ties, diplomatic relations between the two countries have in many instances been volatile. After the takeover in November 1993 by General Sani Abacha as the new Nigerian head of state, Ghana and Nigeria continued to consult on economic, political, and security issues affecting the two countries and West Africa as a whole. Between early August 1994 when Rawlings became ECOWAS chairman and the end of the following October, the Ghanaian president visited Nigeria three times to discuss the peace process in Liberia and measures to restore democracy in that country.: Ghana has a high commission in Abuja and a consulate-general in Lagos.; Nigeria has a high commission in Accra.
Sahrawi Arab Democratic Republic	24 August 1979	Ghana suspended ties on 7 January 2025.
South Africa	6 May 1994	See Ghana–South Africa relations Both countries established diplomatic relations on 6 May 1994 High Commission of Ghana in Pretoria: Ghana has a high commission in Pretoria.; South Africa has a high commission in Accra.
Togo	21 January 1963	See Ghana–Togo relations Both countries established diplomatic relations on 21 January 1963. The strains in Ghana-Togo relations stretch back to pre-independence days. After 1918, following the defeat of Germany, the League of Nations divided the German colony of Togoland from north to south, a decision that divided the Ewe people among the Gold Coast, British Togoland, and French Togoland. After 1945, the United Nations took over the Togoland mandates. During the 1950s, when the independence of Ghana was in sight, demands grew for a separate Ewe state, an idea that Kwame Nkrumah, leader of the Gold Coast independence movement, opposed. Following a UN plebiscite in May 1956, in which a majority of the Ewe voted for union with Ghana, British Togoland became part of the Gold Coast. After Togolese independence in 1960, relations between Togo and Ghana deteriorated, aggravated by political differences and incidents such as smuggling across their common border. At times, relations have verged on open aggression. The result of the transfer of Togoland to Ghana has meant that many Togolese keep one foot on either side of the border, living in Ghana by night and working in the markets of the capital, Lomé, by day.: Ghana has an embassy in Lomé.; Togo has an embassy in Accra.

=== Americas ===
Country	Formal Relations Began	Notes
Brazil	2 January 1961	President of Ghana John Kufuor with President of Brazil Lula da Silva: Brazil has an embassy in Accra.; Ghana has an embassy in Brasília.
Chile	6 October 1961	Both countries established diplomatic relations on 6 October 1961: Chile has an embassy in Accra.; Ghana is accredited to Chile from its embassy in Brasília, Brazil.
Colombia	23 June 1988	See Colombia–Ghana relations Both countries established diplomatic relations on 23 June 1988 Ghana and Colombia's diplomatic relations dated back to 1988 but it remained dormant until July 2013 when Colombia opened its embassy in Accra. Colombia helps Ghana by providing assistance on building capacity of the Ghana Police Service, Immigration Service and the Narcotics Control Board on cybersecurity and drug trafficking.: Colombia has an embassy in Accra.; Ghana is accredited to Colombia from its embassy in Brasília, Brazil.
Jamaica	8 May 1968	See Ghana–Jamaica relations: Ghana is accredited to Jamaica from its embassy in Havana, Cuba.; Jamaica is accredited to Ghana from its high commission in Abuja, Nigeria.
Mexico	8 August 1961	See Ghana–Mexico relations Ghana and Mexico established diplomatic relations on 8 August 1961. Soon afterwards, both nations opened embassies in each other's capitals, respectively. In 1972, Ghana closed its embassy in Mexico City. Mexico closed its embassy in Accra in 1980. Mexico re-opened its embassy in Ghana in 2013.: Ghana is accredited to Mexico from its embassy in Washington, D.C., United States.; Mexico has an embassy in Accra.
Peru	23 June 1987	Main article: Ghana–Peru relations Both countries established diplomatic relations on 23 June 1987: Ghana is accredited to Peru from its embassy in Brasília, Brazil.; Peru has an embassy in Accra.
Suriname	1 April 1977	See: Ghana-Suriname relations: Accra currently hosts the only Surinamese embassy in Africa.
United States	6 March 1957	See Ghana–United States relations Both countries established diplomatic relations on 6 March 1957 The United States is among Ghana's trading partners. The Office of the President of Ghana worked closely with the U.S. Embassy in Accra to establish an American Chamber of Commerce to continue to develop closer economic ties in the private sector. Major U.S. companies operating in the country include ACS, CMS Energy, Coca-Cola, S.C. Johnson, Ralston Purina, Star-Kist, A.H. Robins, Sterling, Pfizer, IBM, 3M, Motorola, Stewart & Stevenson, PriceWaterhouseCoopers, and National Cash Register (NCR). Several U.S. firms recently made or are considering investments in Ghana, primarily in gold mining, wood products, and petroleum. U.S. mining giant Newmont entered Ghana's mining sector in 2004 and intends to invest up to $1 billion. In late 1997, Nuevo Petroleum concluded an oil exploration agreement accounting for one of Ghana's offshore mineral rights zones. Several other U.S. oil companies also are engaged in offshore exploration.: Ghana has an embassy in Washington, D.C., and a consulate-general in New York City.; United States has an embassy in Accra.

=== Asia ===
Country	Formal Relations Began	Notes
Bangladesh	19 July 1974	See Bangladesh–Ghana relations Both countries established diplomatic relations on 19 July 1974 when Bangladesh High Commissioner to Ghana presented his credentials to the Head of State Colonel I. K. Acheampong.: Bangladesh is accredited to Ghana from its high commission in Abuja, Nigeria.; Ghana is accredited to Bangladesh from its high commission in New Delhi, India.
China	5 July 1960	See China–Ghana relations Both countries established diplomatic relations on 5 July 1960. Ghana's relations with the People's Republic of China (PRC) date back to 1960 when President Nkrumah became one of Africa's first leaders to recognise the country. Ghana and the PRC have had close and relatively good relations in that time despite a short period of relatively cold relations after Nkrumah was deposed in 1966.: China has an embassy in Accra.; Ghana has an embassy in Beijing.
India	6 March 1957	See Ghana–India relations Both countries established diplomatic relations on 6 March 1957.: Ghana has a high commission in New Delhi.; India has a high commission in Accra.
Israel	6 March 1957, severed 28 October 1973, restored 9 August 1994	See Ghana–Israel relations: Ghana has an embassy in Tel Aviv.; Israel has an embassy in Accra.
Malaysia	5 December 1966	See Ghana–Malaysia relations: Ghana has a high commission in Kuala Lumpur.; Malaysia has a high commission in Accra.
Pakistan	1958	Pakistan and Ghana enjoy amicable and cordial relations. There has been historical support extended by Pakistan to the African states particularly OIC member states in which Ghana has significant importance. Despite this, there has been a low level of bilateral trade between the two countries. The volume of bilateral trade during 2011 was just $19 million.: Ghana is accredited to Pakistan from its embassy in Riyadh, Saudi Arabia.; Pakistan has a high commission in Accra.
Palestine	29 November 1988	See Ghana–Palestine relations: Palestine has an embassy in Accra.
Turkey	1958	See Ghana–Turkey relations: Ghana has an embassy in Ankara.; Turkey has an embassy in Accra.; Trade volume between the two countries was US$353.3 million in 2018.

=== Europe ===
Country	Formal Relations Began	Notes
Denmark	28 September 1961	See Denmark–Ghana relations Both countries established diplomatic relations on 28 September 1961 when was accredited first Ambassador of Denmark to Ghana Mr. Hans Adolf Biering Denmark has historic relations with Ghana from once possessing Danish Gold Coast.: Denmark has an embassy in Accra.; Ghana has an embassy in Copenhagen.
France	7 July 1957	Both countries established diplomatic relations on 7 July 1957.: France has an embassy in Accra.; Ghana has an embassy in Paris.
Germany	24 June 1957	See Germany–Ghana relations Both countries established diplomatic relations on 24 June 1957.: Germany has an embassy in Accra.; Ghana has an embassy in Berlin.
Poland	31 December 1959	Both countries established diplomatic relations on 31 December 1959: Ghana is accredited to Poland from its embassy in Berlin, Germany.; Poland is accredited to Ghana from its embassy in Abuja, Nigeria.
Russia	14 January 1958	See Ghana–Russia relations: Ghana has an embassy in Moscow.; Russia has an embassy in Accra.
Spain	10 November 1967	See Ghana–Spain relations Both countries established diplomatic relations on 10 November 1967: Ghana has an embassy in Madrid.; Spain has an embassy in Accra.
United Kingdom	6 March 1957	See Ghana–United Kingdom relations Foreign Secretary Philip Hammond with Ghanaian Hanna Tetteh in London, May 2015. Ghana established diplomatic relations with the United Kingdom on 6 March 1957.: Ghana maintains a high commission in London.; The United Kingdom is accredited to Ghana through its high commission in Accra.; The UK governed Ghana from 1821 to 1957, when Ghana achieved full independence. Both countries share common membership of the Atlantic Co-operation Pact, the Commonwealth, the International Criminal Court, and the World Trade Organization. Bilaterally the two countries have a Development Partnership, an Interim Trade Partnership Agreement, a High Level Prosperity Partnership, and an Investment Agreement.

== Ghana and the Commonwealth of Nations ==
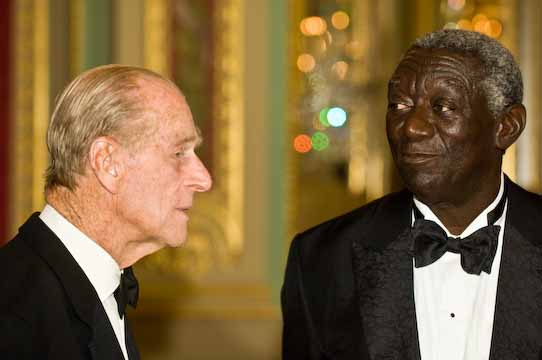
Recipient of the 2008 Chatham House Prize and 10th President of Ghana John Kufuor with Prince Philip, the Husband of the Head of the Commonwealth and Queen of the United Kingdom, Elizabeth II.

Ghana has been a member state of the Commonwealth since independence in 1957, firstly as a Dominion, then as a republic in the Commonwealth of Nations.

== See also ==
- Visa policy of Ghana
- Minister for Foreign Affairs (Ghana)
- List of diplomatic missions in Ghana
- List of diplomatic missions of Ghana
- List of ambassadors and high commissioners of Ghana
- Ghana and the Non-Aligned Movement
