= Ghana–Russia relations =

- Ghana: Russia

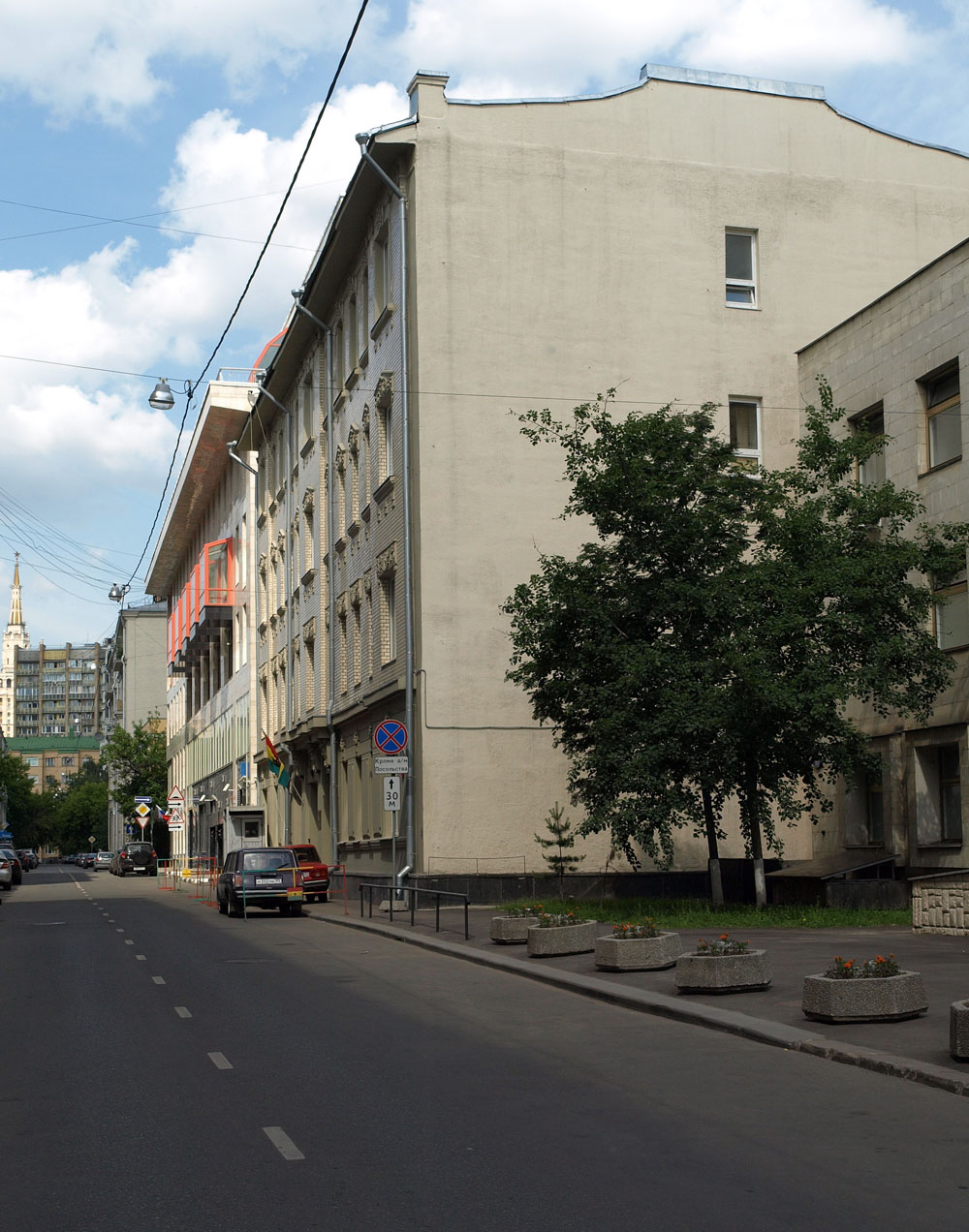
Embassy of Ghana in Moscow

Ghana–Russia relations (Russian: Российско-Ганские отношения) are the bilateral relationship between the two countries, Ghana and Russia. Russia has an embassy in Accra, and Ghana has an embassy in Moscow. Relations are still very friendly and close.

== Bilateral Relations ==
The links between the two countries had a particularly dynamic growth in the years of the first president of Ghana Kwame Nkrumah who ruled from 1957 to 1966.

In 1997, the Ghana delegation visited the Council of Federation of the Federal Assembly of the Russian Federation. In 2003, a visit was made by the delegation of the State Duma of the Russian Federation headed by its deputy chairman Artur Chilingarov. In 2004, the Russian Federation was visited by a delegation of the Parliament of Ghana, led by Speaker Peter Ala Adjetey. Russia and Ghana actively cooperate in the UN and other international organizations. In February 2004, the New York Deputy Minister of Foreign Affairs of the Russian Federation Alexander Saltanov had a conversation with the Foreign Minister of Ghana Nana Akufo-Addo. In October 2004, Deputy Minister of Foreign Affairs of the Russian Federation Yuri Fedotov visited Ghana. In June 2007, as part of the summit of the Group of Eight, a brief meeting between Vladimir Putin and President of Ghana John Kufuor took place in Heiligendamm. The practice of bilateral political consultations between the Foreign Ministries of both countries was discussed at that meeting. In January 2006 in Accra, at the Ghana elections of 2006–2007 to the UN Security Council as a non-permanent member, it conducted Russian-Ghanaian consultations on the UN agenda. In July 2007, the Foreign Minister of Ghana Nana Akufo-Addo paid a working visit to Moscow, during which a protocol was signed regarding ministerial consultations (last consultation was held September 16, 2011).

In an interview with the Ghana News Agency in Accra, Valery Orlov, Russia's ambassador to Ghana, reaffirmed the Russian government's intention to deepen relations with Ghana in the interests of both countries and support the development of the African continent. He said he believes that the important events that have taken place between the two countries over the years will give new dimensions to their traditional friendship and deepen the ties between them.

In the spring of 2016, the Ghanaian Embassy in Moscow organized a symposium, which was attended by diplomats, prominent international traders and analysts, as well as Ghanaian citizens living in the Russian Federation. The symposium was part of the Independence Day celebrations in Moscow. The meeting was chaired by the Ambassador Extraordinary and Plenipotentiary of the Republic of Ghana to the Russian Federation, Kozo Kpoku Alabo.

== See also ==
- Foreign relations of Ghana
- Foreign relations of Russia
