= Ghana–Mexico relations =

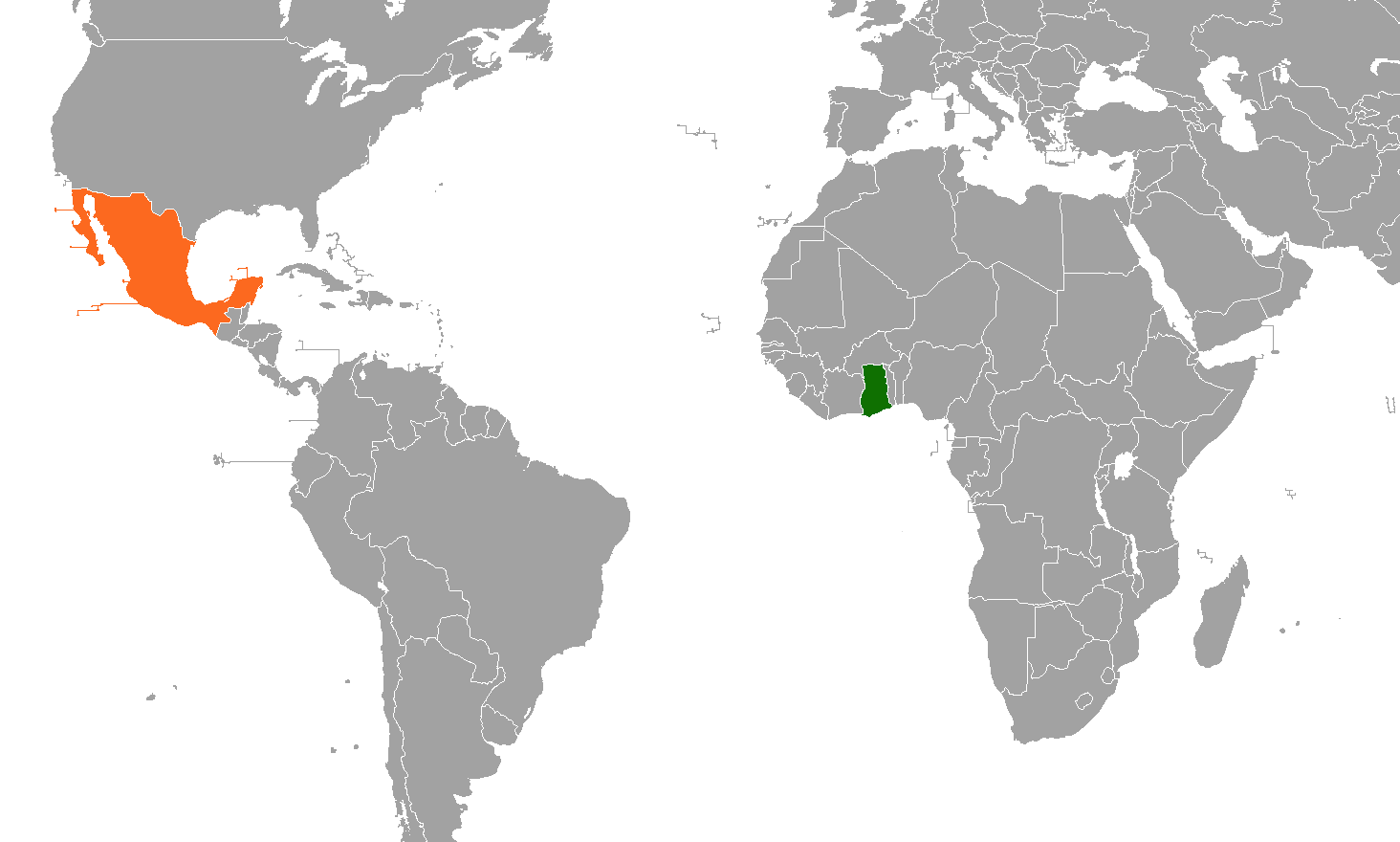

- Ghana: Mexico

The nations of Ghana and Mexico established diplomatic relations in 1961. Both nations are members of the United Nations.

== History ==
In March 1957, Ghana obtained its independence from the United Kingdom, becoming the first African nation to do so. The independence ceremony was attended by Mexican Ambassador Eduardo Espinosa y Prieto who previously had been in Ghana a year earlier as UN appointed Commissioner for the 1956 British Togoland status plebiscite. While in Ghana, Ambassador Espinosa y Prieto met with President Kwame Nkrumah and discussed the establishing diplomatic relations between both nations.

On 8 August 1961 Mexico became the first country in Latin America to recognize and establish diplomatic relations with Ghana. That same year, Mexican President Adolfo López Mateos sent a presidential delegation of goodwill, led by Special Envoy Alejandro Carrillo Marcor and Delegate José Ezequiel Iturriaga, to visit Ghana.

In 1965 Mexico opened an embassy in Accra, and Ghana followed suit by opening an embassy in Mexico City. In 1972, Mexico closed its embassy in Accra due to budgetary reasons. In 1980, Ghana closed its embassy in Mexico City.

In December 2009, Ghanaian Foreign Minister Muhammad Mumuni paid an official visit to Mexico, becoming the highest-ranking Ghanaian official to do so. In May 2011, Mexican Foreign Minister Patricia Espinosa met with Ghanaian Foreign Minister Muhammad Mumuni during the Conference on Global Governance and the Reform of the Security Council of the United Nations in Rome. Both officials reviewed the status of the bilateral relationship and discussed multilateral issues such as the reform of the Security Council and follow-up of the Cancun Agreements on climate change.

In 2013, Mexico announced the re-opening of its embassy in Accra, sharing the embassy premises with members of the Pacific Alliance (which includes Chile, Colombia and Peru). In December 2018, Foreign Deputy Minister Charles Owiredu arrived in Mexico City to attend the inauguration for Mexican President Andrés Manuel López Obrador.

In August 2019, Mexican Foreign Undersecretary Julián Ventura Valero paid a visit to Ghana and met with Foreign Deputy Minister Charles Owiredu. Both nations agreed to establish a Consultation Mechanism on Common Interests. Ghana also declared its intention to re-open an embassy in Mexico City.

En 2021, both nations celebrated 60 years of diplomatic relations. In May 2026, the Ghanaian government announced its intention to re-open an embassy in Mexico City.

== High-level visits ==
High-level visits from Ghana to Mexico

- Foreign Minister Muhammad Mumuni (2009)
- Minister of Trade Alan John Kyerematen (2017)
- Foreign Deputy Minister Charles Owiredu (2018)
- Foreign Deputy Minister James Gyakye Quayson (2026)

High-level visits from Mexico to Ghana

- Special Envoy Alejandro Carrillo Marcor (1961)
- Delegate José Ezequiel Iturriaga (1961)
- Director General for ProMéxico Francisco González Díaz (2016)
- Foreign Director General for Africa and the Middle East Jorge Álvarez Fuentes (2018)
- Foreign Undersecretary Julián Ventura Valero (2019)

== Bilateral agreements ==
Both nations have signed a Memorandum of Understanding between the Ghana Investment Promotion Centre and ProMéxico (2016) and a Memorandum for the Establishment of a Consultation Mechanism on Matters of Common Interest (2019).

== Trade ==
In 2023, trade between Ghana and Mexico totaled US$13.3 million. Ghana's main exports to Mexico include: natural rubber, cocoa powder, clothing articles, wood, vegetables oil, electronic gadgets and devices, powder gemstones and semiprecious stones. Mexico's main exports to Ghana include: malt extract and food preparations, alcohol, chemical based products, telephones and mobile phones, frozen or chilled fish, motor cars and other vehicles, tractors, tubes and pipes.

== Diplomatic missions ==
- Ghana is accredited to Mexico from its embassy in Washington, D.C., United States.
- Mexico has an embassy in Accra.

== Gallery ==
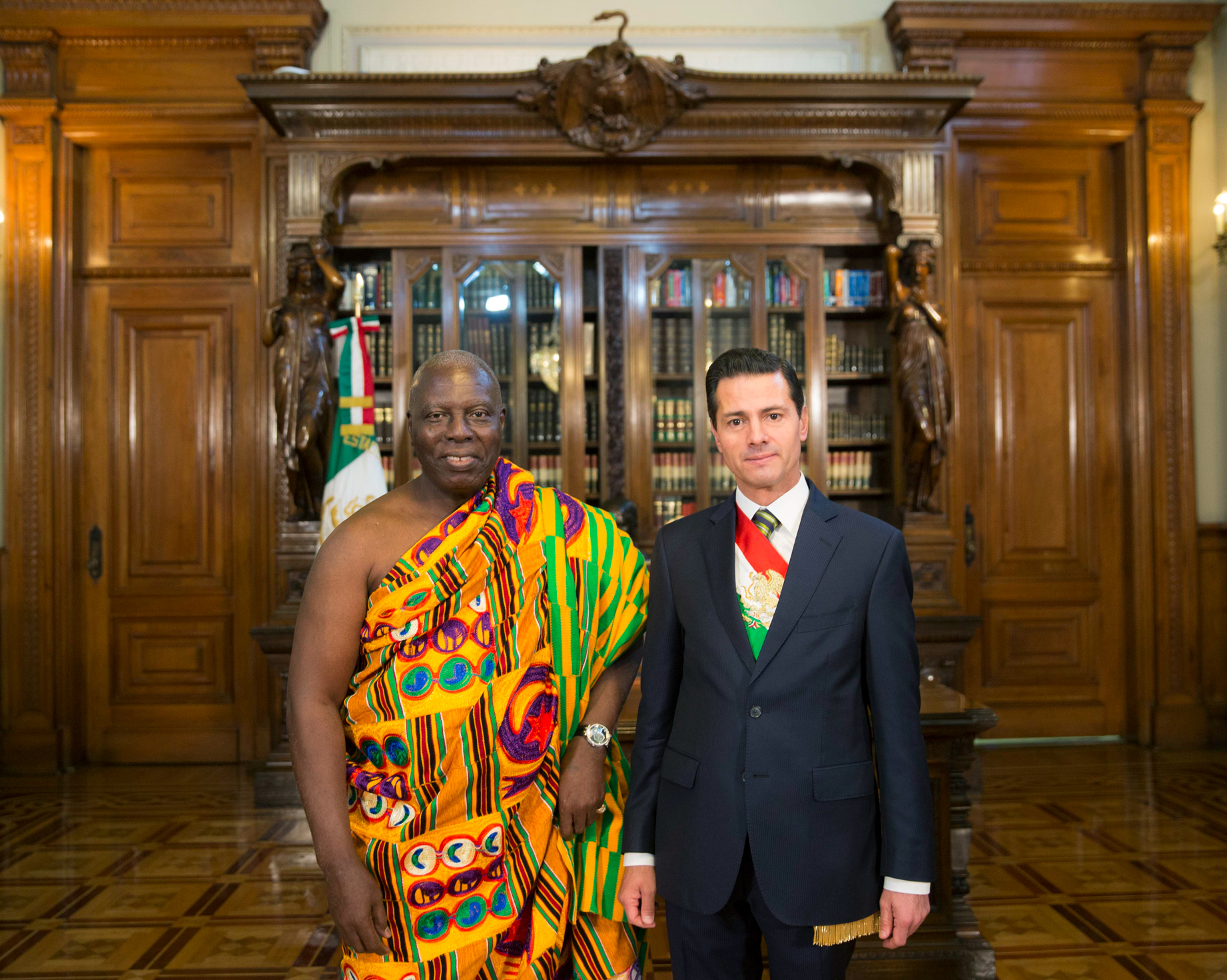
Non-resident Ghanaian Ambassador Barfuor Adjei-Barwuah with Mexican President Enrique Peña Nieto in Mexico City

Mexican Independence Day celebration in Ghana

== See also ==
- Foreign relations of Ghana
- Foreign relations of Mexico
