= List of diplomatic missions of Ghana =

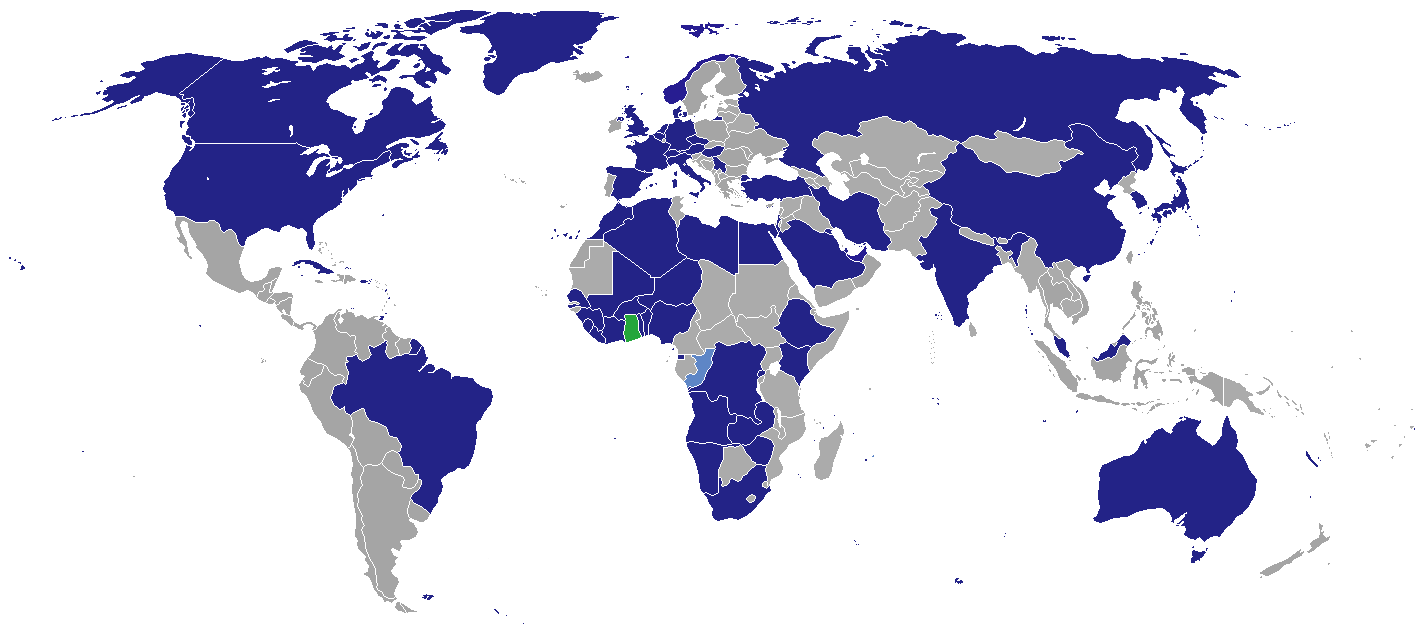
Diplomatic missions of Ghana

The Republic of Ghana has several diplomatic missions worldwide. As a member of the Commonwealth of Nations, Ghanaian diplomatic missions in the capitals of other Commonwealth members are known as High Commissions.

Excluded from this listing are honorary consulates and trade missions.

== Current missions ==
=== Africa ===
Host country	Host city	Mission	Concurrent accreditation	Ref.
Algeria	Algiers	Embassy	Countries: Sahrawi Republic; Tunisia	
Angola	Luanda	Embassy	Countries: Madagascar; São Tomé and Príncipe	
Benin	Cotonou	Embassy		
Burkina Faso	Ouagadougou	Embassy	Countries: Chad	
Congo-Brazzaville	Brazzaville	Consulate-General (Note: Subordinate to the embassy in Kinshasa)		
Congo-Kinshasa	Kinshasa	Embassy	Countries: Central African Republic; Congo-Brazzaville	
Egypt	Cairo	Embassy	Countries: Palestine; Lebanon; Sudan	
Equatorial Guinea	Malabo	Embassy	Countries: Cameroon	
Ethiopia	Addis Ababa	Embassy	Countries: Djibouti; Eritrea; Somalia; South Sudan; Multilateral Organizations: African Union; United Nations Economic Commission for Africa	
Guinea	Conakry	Embassy	Countries: Guinea-Bissau	
Ivory Coast	Abidjan	Embassy		
Kenya	Nairobi	High Commission	Countries: Burundi; Tanzania; Uganda; Multilateral Organizations: United Nations; United Nations Environment Programme; United Nations Human Settlements Programme	
Liberia	Monrovia	Embassy		
Libya	Tripoli	Embassy		
Mali	Bamako	Embassy	Countries: Mauritania	
Mauritius	Port Louis	Consulate-General (Note: Subordinate to the high commission in Pretoria)		
Morocco	Rabat	Embassy		
Namibia	Windhoek	High Commission	Countries: Botswana	
Niger	Niamey	Embassy		
Nigeria	Abuja	High Commission	Multilateral Organizations: Economic Community of West African States	
Nigeria	Lagos	Consulate-General	Multilateral Organizations: Economic Community of West African States	
Rwanda	Kigali	High Commission		
Senegal	Dakar	Embassy	Countries: Cape Verde; Gambia	
Sierra Leone	Freetown	High Commission		
South Africa	Pretoria	High Commission	Countries: Eswatini; Lesotho; Mauritius; Seychelles	
Togo	Lomé	High Commission		
Zambia	Lusaka	High Commission		
Zimbabwe	Harare	Embassy	Countries: Comoros; Mozambique	

=== Americas ===
Host country	Host city	Mission	Concurrent accreditation	Ref.
Brazil	Brasília	Embassy	Countries: Argentina; Bolivia; Chile; Colombia; Ecuador; Paraguay; Peru; Suriname; Uruguay; Venezuela	
Canada	Ottawa	High Commission		
Canada	Toronto	Consulate-General		
Cuba	Havana	Embassy	Countries: Bahamas; Dominican Republic; Jamaica; Nicaragua; Panama	
Trinidad and Tobago	Port of Spain	High Commission	Countries: Antigua and Barbuda; Barbados; Dominica; Grenada; Guyana; Saint Kitts and Nevis; Saint Lucia; Saint Vincent and the Grenadines	
United States	Washington, D.C.	Embassy	Countries: Belize; Costa Rica; El Salvador; Guatemala; Honduras; Marshall Islands; Mexico; Micronesia; Multilateral Organizations: Organization of American States (Note: Accredited as an observer mission.)	
United States	New York City	Consulate-General	Countries: Belize; Costa Rica; El Salvador; Guatemala; Honduras; Marshall Islands; Mexico; Micronesia; Multilateral Organizations: Organization of American States	

=== Asia ===
Host country	Host city	Mission	Concurrent accreditation	Ref.
China	Beijing	Embassy	Countries: Mongolia; Nepal; North Korea	
China	Guangzhou	Consulate-General	Countries: Mongolia; Nepal; North Korea	
India	New Delhi	High Commission	Countries: Bangladesh; Maldives; Sri Lanka	
Iran	Tehran	Embassy	Countries: Afghanistan; Kyrgyzstan; Pakistan; Syria; Tajikistan; Turkmenistan; Uzbekistan	
Israel	Tel Aviv	Embassy	Countries: Cyprus	
Japan	Tokyo	Embassy	Countries: Singapore	
Kuwait	Kuwait City	Embassy	Countries: Iraq	
Malaysia	Kuala Lumpur	High Commission	Countries: Brunei; Cambodia; Indonesia; Laos; Myanmar; Philippines; Thailand; Timor-Leste; Vietnam; Multilateral Organizations: Association of Southeast Asian Nations	
Qatar	Doha	Embassy		
South Korea	Seoul	Embassy		
Saudi Arabia	Riyadh	Embassy	Countries: Bahrain; Jordan; Oman	
Saudi Arabia	Jeddah	Consulate-General	Countries: Bahrain; Jordan; Oman	
Turkey	Ankara	Embassy	Countries: Albania; Bosnia and Herzegovina; Bulgaria; Georgia; Kosovo; Ukraine	
Turkey	Istanbul	Consulate-General	Countries: Albania; Bosnia and Herzegovina; Bulgaria; Georgia; Kosovo; Ukraine	
United Arab Emirates	Abu Dhabi	Embassy		
United Arab Emirates	Dubai	Consulate-General		

=== Europe ===
Host country	Host city	Mission	Concurrent accreditation	Ref.
Austria	Vienna	Embassy	Multilateral Organizations: United Nations; International Atomic Energy Agency; UNIDO; UNODC	
Belgium	Brussels	Embassy	Countries: Luxembourg; Multilateral Organizations: European Union; Organisation of African, Caribbean and Pacific States	
Czechia	Prague	Embassy	Countries: North Macedonia; Poland; Romania	
Denmark	Copenhagen	Embassy	Countries: Sweden	
France	Paris	Embassy	Countries: Monaco; Portugal; Multilateral Organizations: Francophonie; OECD; UNESCO	
Germany	Berlin	Embassy	Countries: Estonia; Latvia; Lithuania	
Germany	Hamburg	Consulate-General	Countries: Estonia; Latvia; Lithuania	
Holy See	Rome (Note: The Ghanaian Embassy to the Holy See is located outside Vatican territory, in Rome.)	Embassy	Countries: Croatia; Greece	
Hungary	Budapest	Embassy	Countries: Slovakia	
Italy	Rome	Embassy	Countries: Montenegro; San Marino; Slovenia; Multilateral Organizations: Food and Agriculture Organization; International Fund for Agricultural Development; World Food Programme	
Malta	Valletta (Note: Although officially titled as a high commission in Valletta, its chancery is physically located in the nearby town of Sliema.)	High Commission		
Netherlands	The Hague	Embassy	Multilateral Organizations: OPCW	
Norway	Oslo	Embassy	Countries: Finland; Iceland	
Russia	Moscow	Embassy	Countries: Armenia; Azerbaijan; Belarus; Kazakhstan; Moldova	
Serbia	Belgrade	Embassy		
Spain	Madrid	Embassy	Countries: Andorra; Multilateral Organizations: UN Tourism	
Switzerland	Bern	Embassy	Countries: Liechtenstein	
United Kingdom	London	High Commission	Countries: Ireland	

=== Oceania ===
Host country	Host city	Mission	Concurrent accreditation	Ref.
Australia	Canberra	High Commission	Countries: Fiji; Kiribati; Nauru; New Zealand; Papua New Guinea; Samoa; Solomon Islands; Tonga; Vanuatu	

=== Multilateral organizations ===
Organization	Host city	Host country	Type of mission	Concurrent accreditation	Ref.
United Nations	New York City	United States	Permanent Mission		
United Nations	Geneva	Switzerland	Permanent Mission	Multilateral Organizations: World Trade Organization	

== Gallery ==
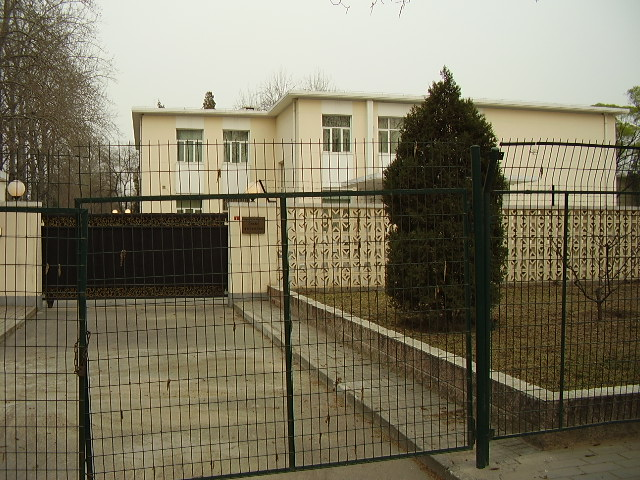
Embassy in Beijing

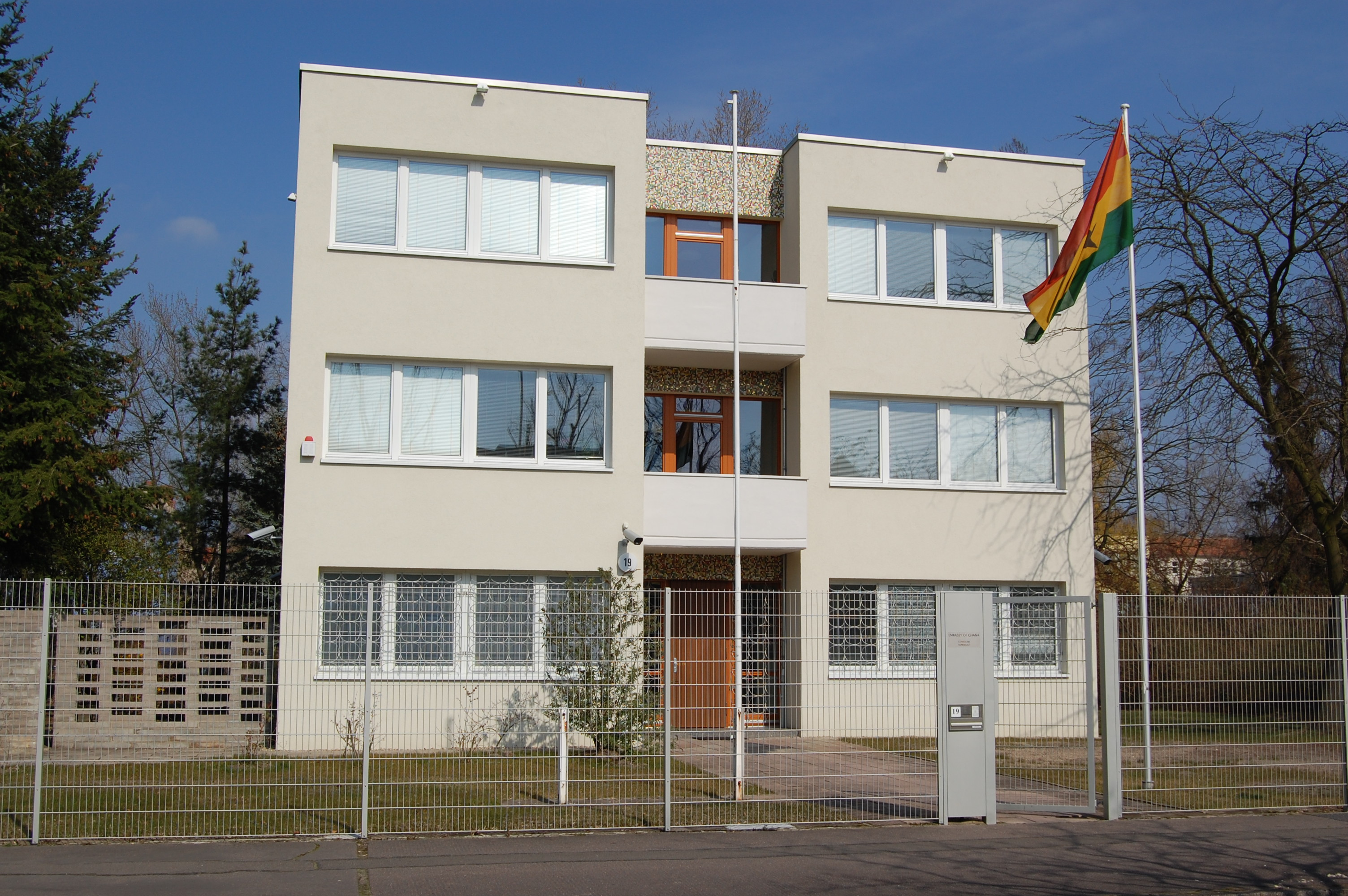
Embassy in Berlin

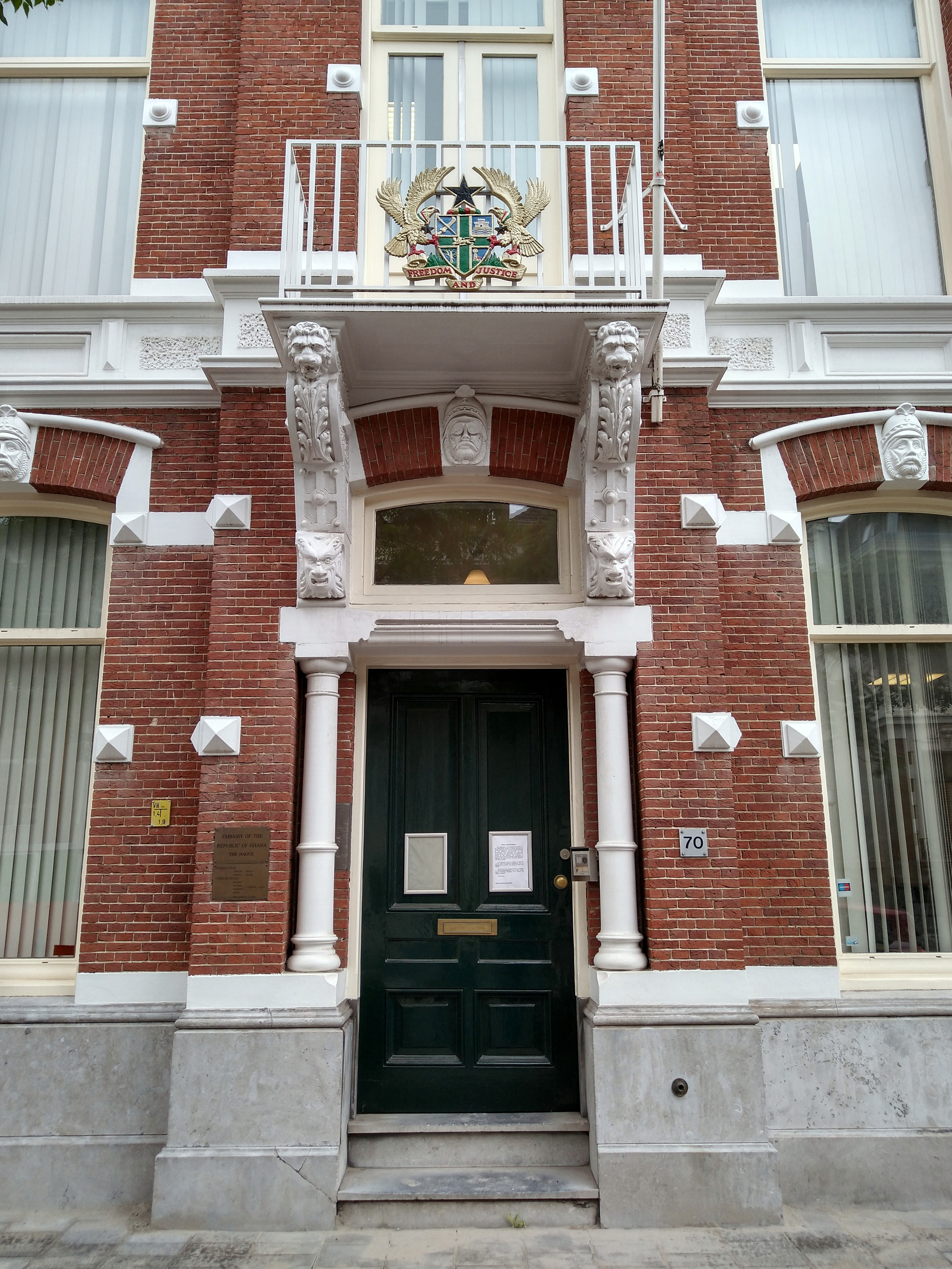
Embassy in The Hague

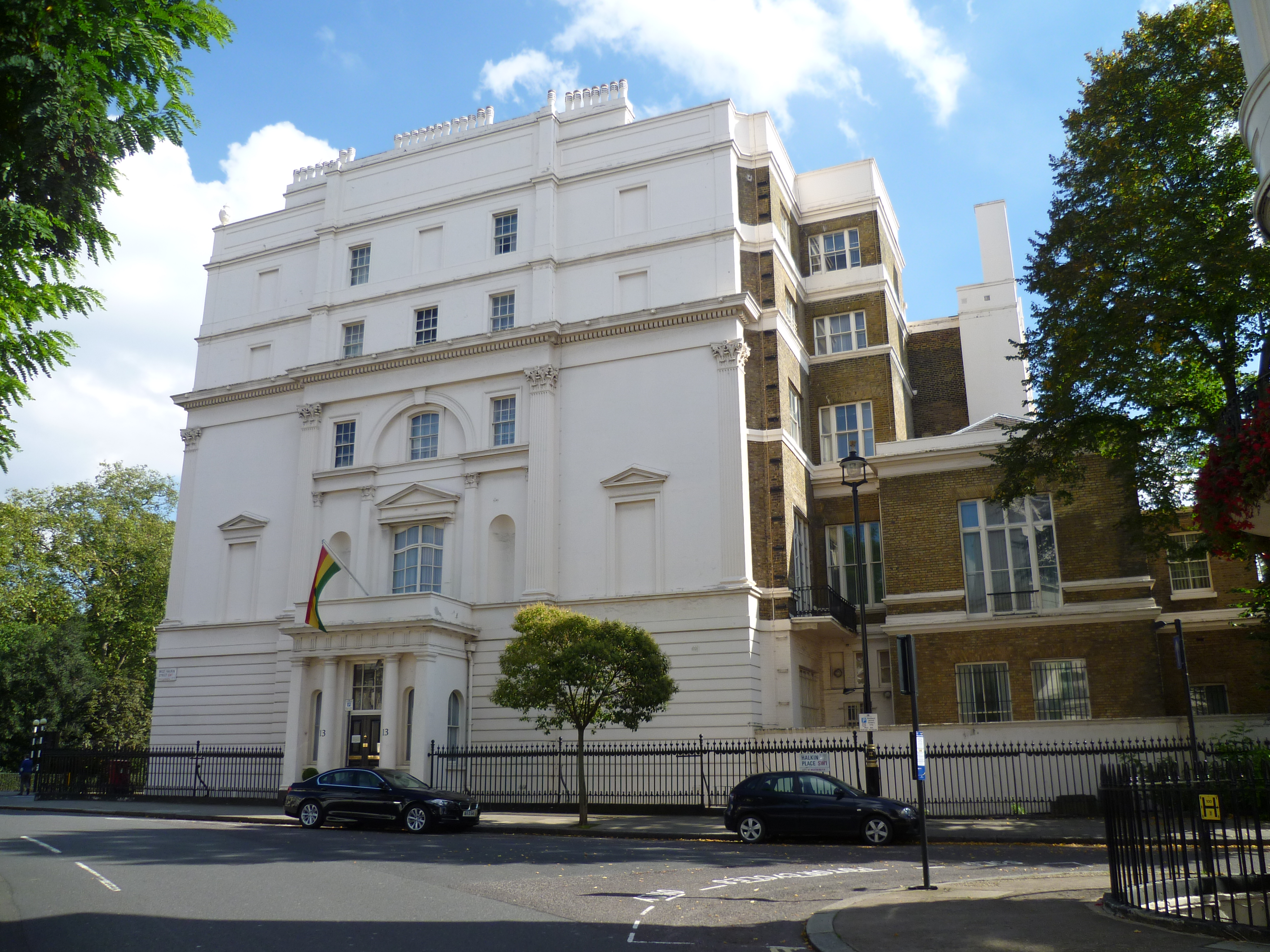
High Commission in London

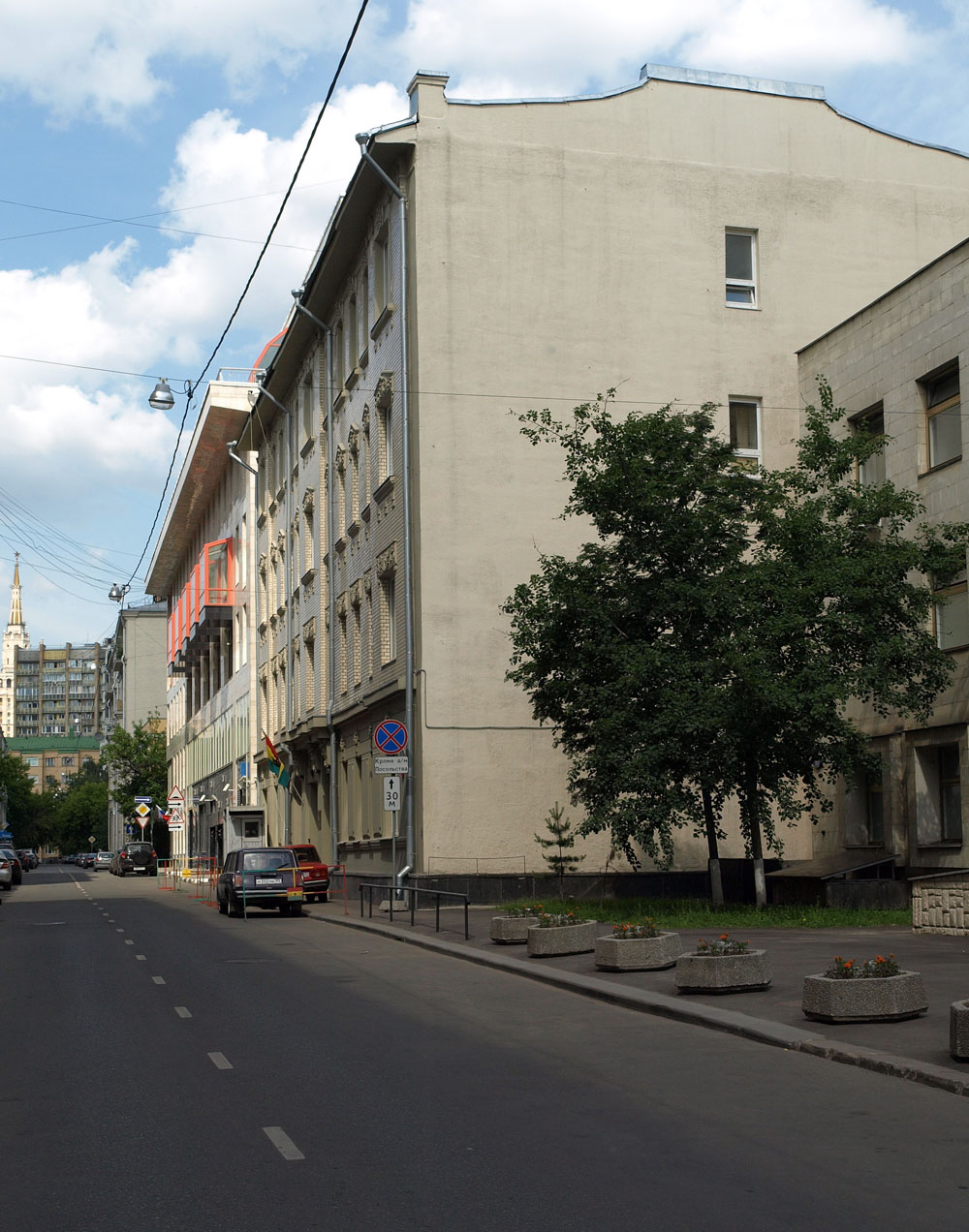
Embassy in Moscow

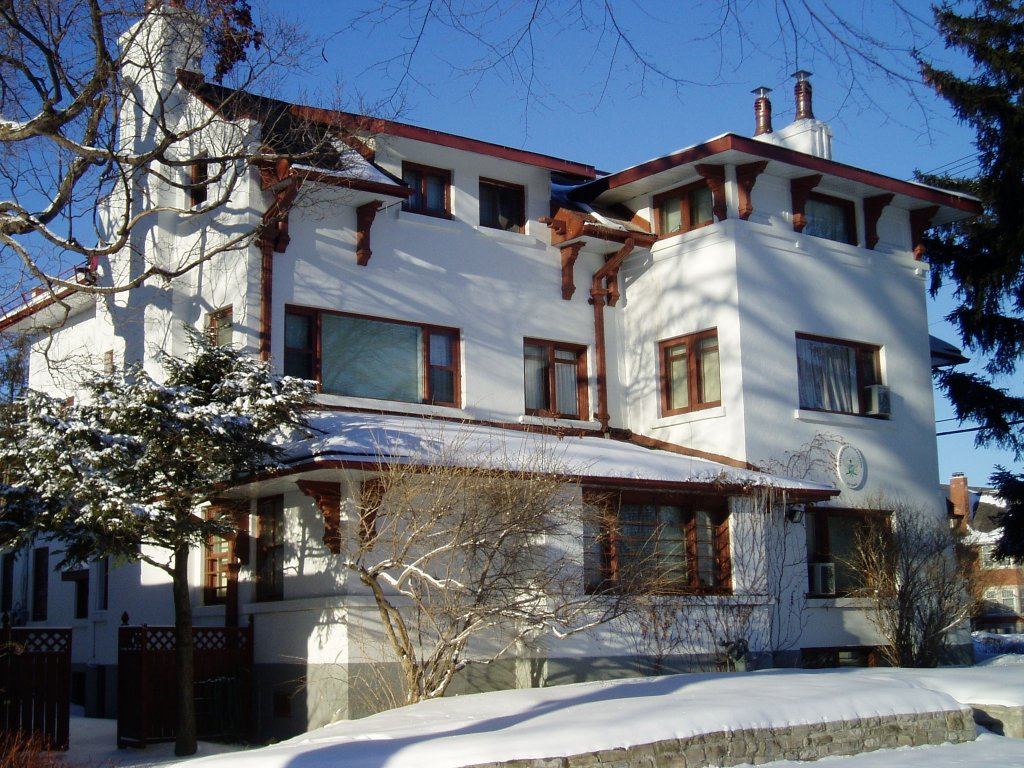
High Commission in Ottawa

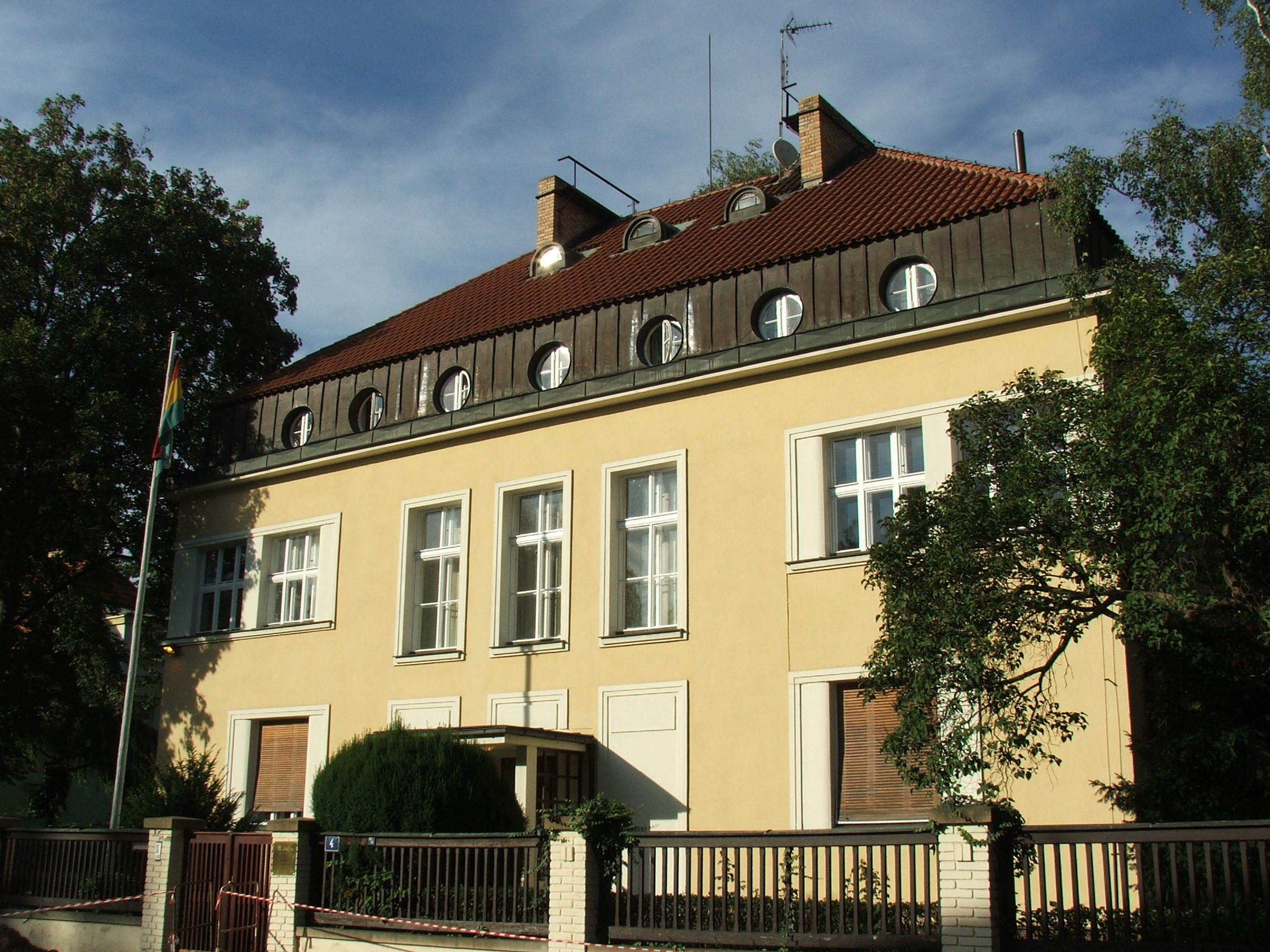
Embassy in Prague

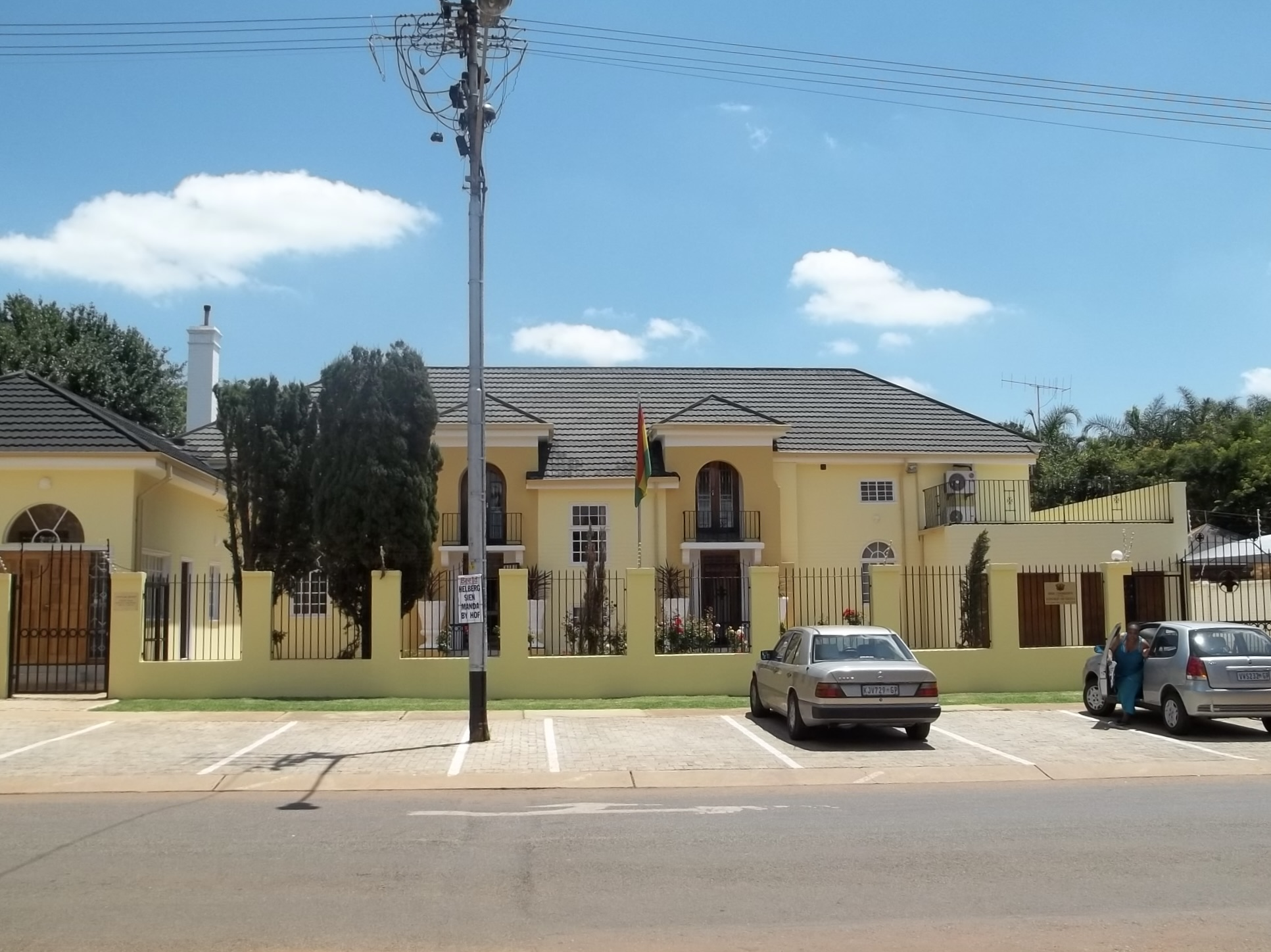
High Commission in Pretoria

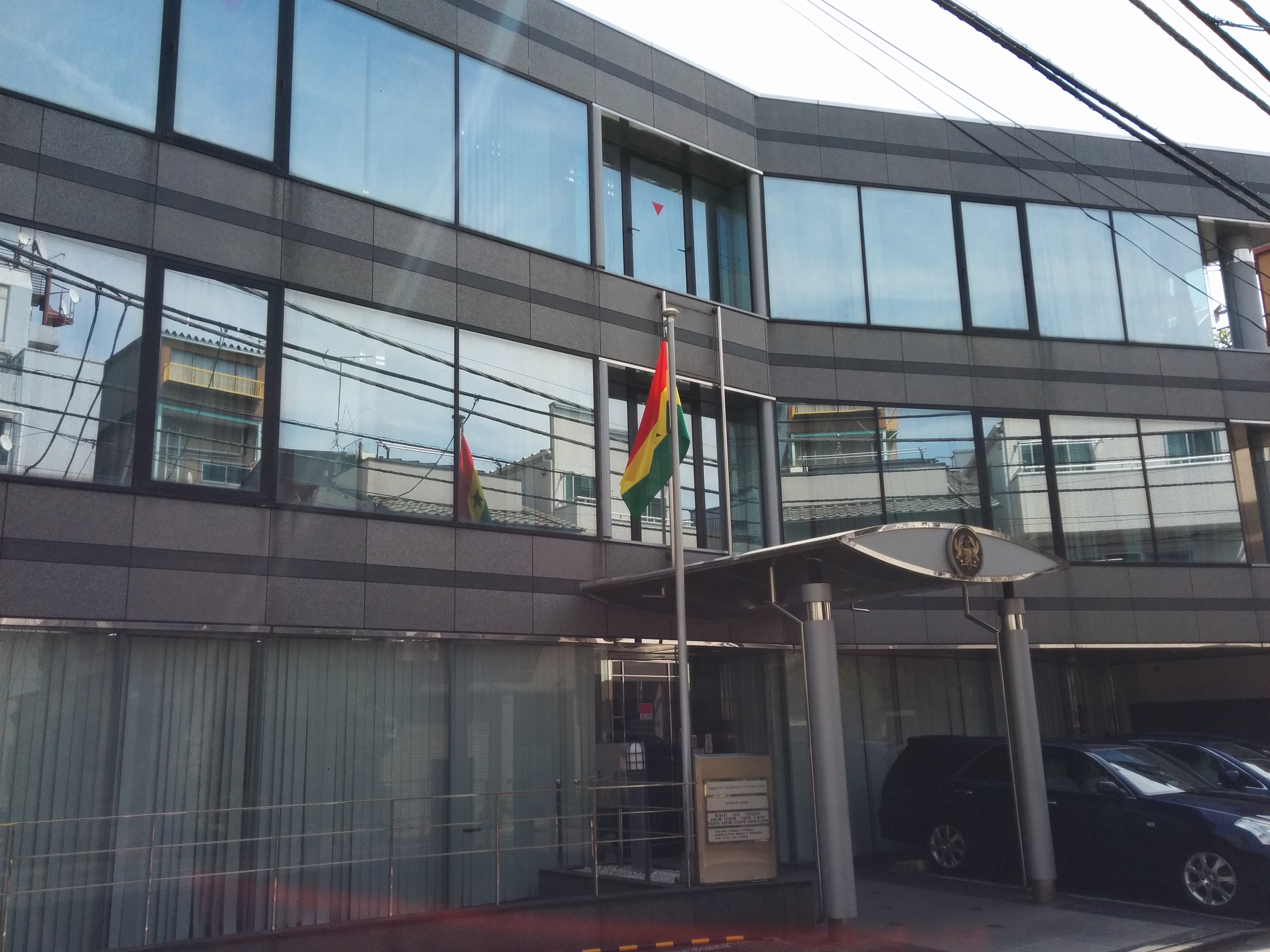
Embassy in Tokyo

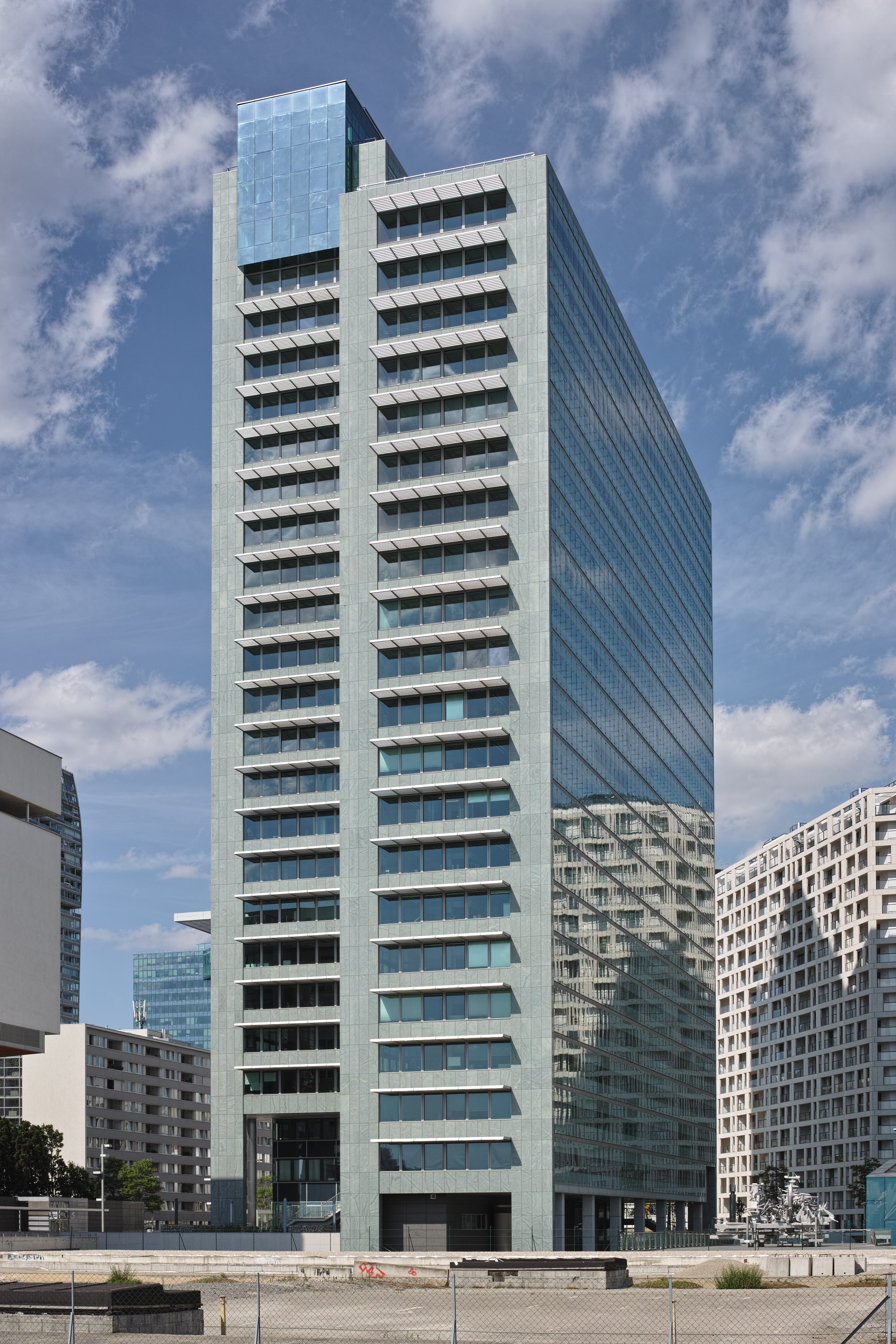
Building hosting the Embassy in Vienna

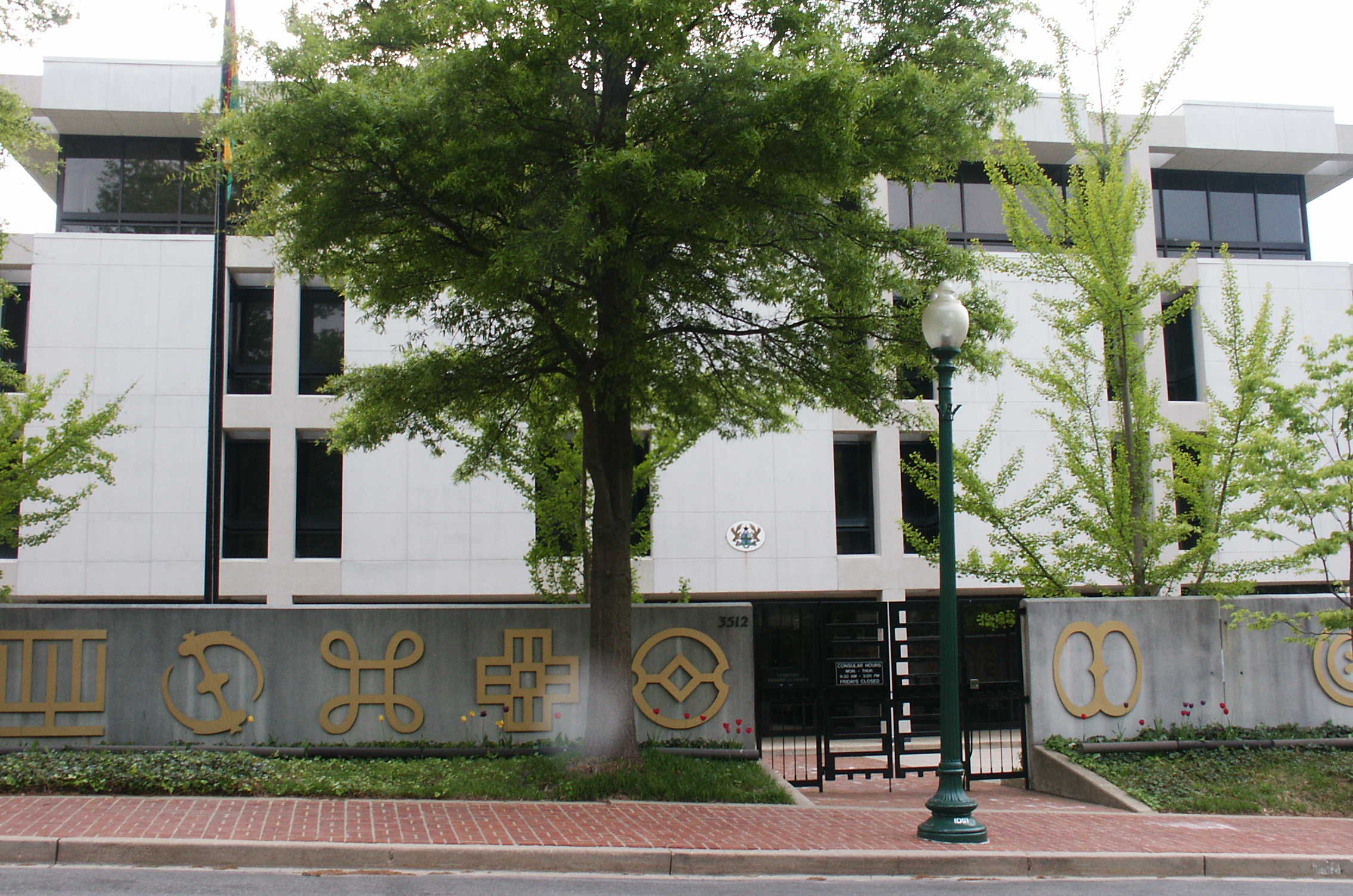
Embassy in Washington, D.C.

== Diplomatic missions to open ==
Host country	Host city	Mission	Ref.
Ireland	Dublin	Embassy	
Mexico	Mexico City	Embassy	
Portugal	Lisbon	Consulate-General	
Singapore	Singapore	High Commission	
United States	Massachusetts (Note: The article mentions that a consular mission will be established in the US state of Massachusetts, but does not specify the city.)	Consulate-General	

== Closed missions ==
=== Americas ===
Host country	Host city	Mission	Year closed	Ref.
Mexico	Mexico City	Embassy (Note: To be reopened)	1980	

=== Asia ===
Host country	Host city	Mission	Year closed	Ref.
North Vietnam	Hanoi	Embassy	1966	

=== Europe ===
Host country	Host city	Mission	Year closed	Ref.
Ireland	Dublin	Embassy (Note: To be reopened)	2009	

== See also ==
- Foreign relations of Ghana
- List of ambassadors and high commissioners of Ghana
- List of diplomatic missions in Ghana
- Visa policy of Ghana
