= List of diplomatic missions in Ghana =

This article lists the diplomatic mission in Ghana. The capital Accra currently hosts 70 embassies/high commissions, while Kumasi hosts one consulate.

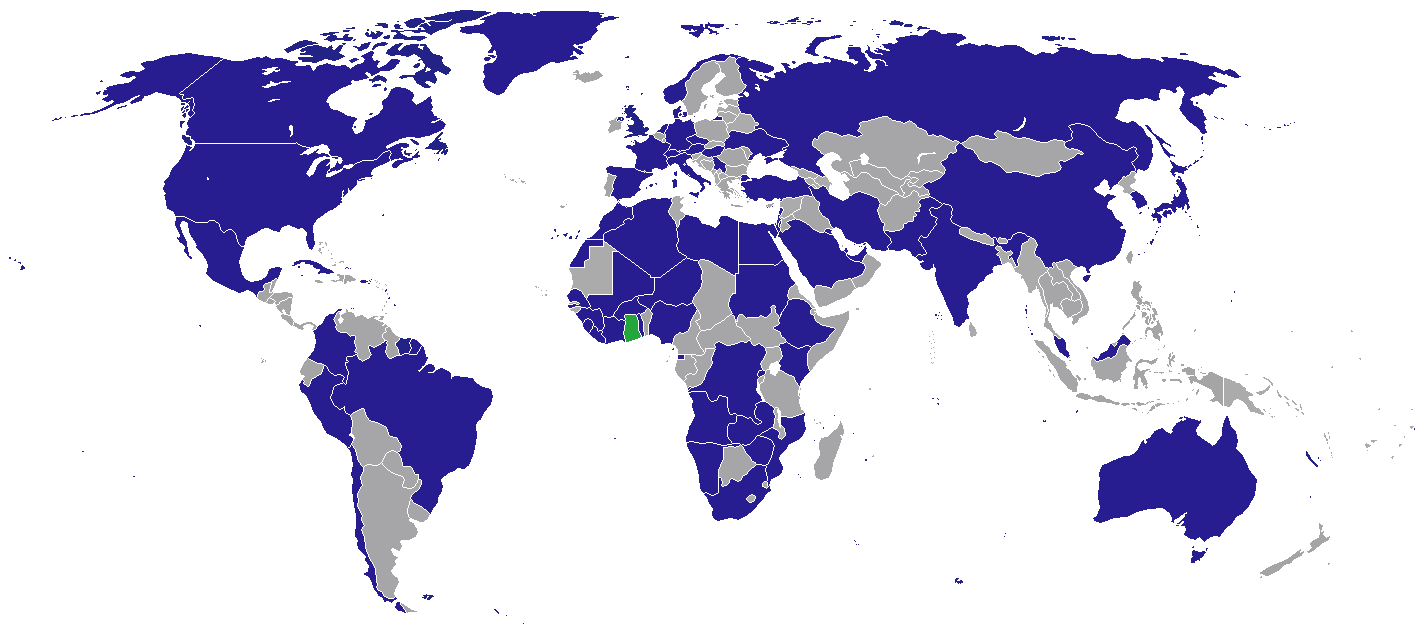
Map of diplomatic missions in Ghana

== Diplomatic missions in Accra, Ghana ==
=== Embassies/High Commissions ===
Entries marked with an asterisk (*) are member-states of the Commonwealth of Nations. As such, their embassies are formally termed as "high commissions".

1. Algeria
2. Angola
3. Australia*
4. Austria
5. Barbados*
6. Brazil
7. Burkina Faso
8. Canada*
9. Chile
10. China
11. Colombia
12. Congo-Kinshasa
13. Cuba
14. Czech Republic
15. Denmark
16. Egypt
17. Equatorial Guinea
18. Ethiopia
19. France
20. Germany
21. Guinea
22. Holy See
23. Hungary
24. India*
25. Iran
26. Israel
27. Italy
28. Ivory Coast
29. Japan
30. Kenya*
31. Kuwait
32. Lebanon
33. Liberia
34. Libya
35. Malaysia*
36. Mali
37. Malta*
38. Mexico
39. Morocco
40. Mozambique*
41. Namibia*
42. Netherlands
43. Niger
44. Nigeria*
45. Norway
46. Pakistan
47. Palestine
48. Peru
49. Qatar
50. Russia
51. Rwanda*
52. Sahrawi Republic
53. Saudi Arabia
54. Senegal
55. Serbia
56. Sierra Leone*
57. South Africa*
58. South Korea
59. Spain
60. Sudan
61. Suriname
62. Switzerland
63. Togo*
64. Turkey
65. Ukraine
66. United Arab Emirates
67. United Kingdom*
68. United States
69. Zambia*
70. Zimbabwe

=== Other missions or delegations ===
1. European Union (delegation)

=== Gallery ===
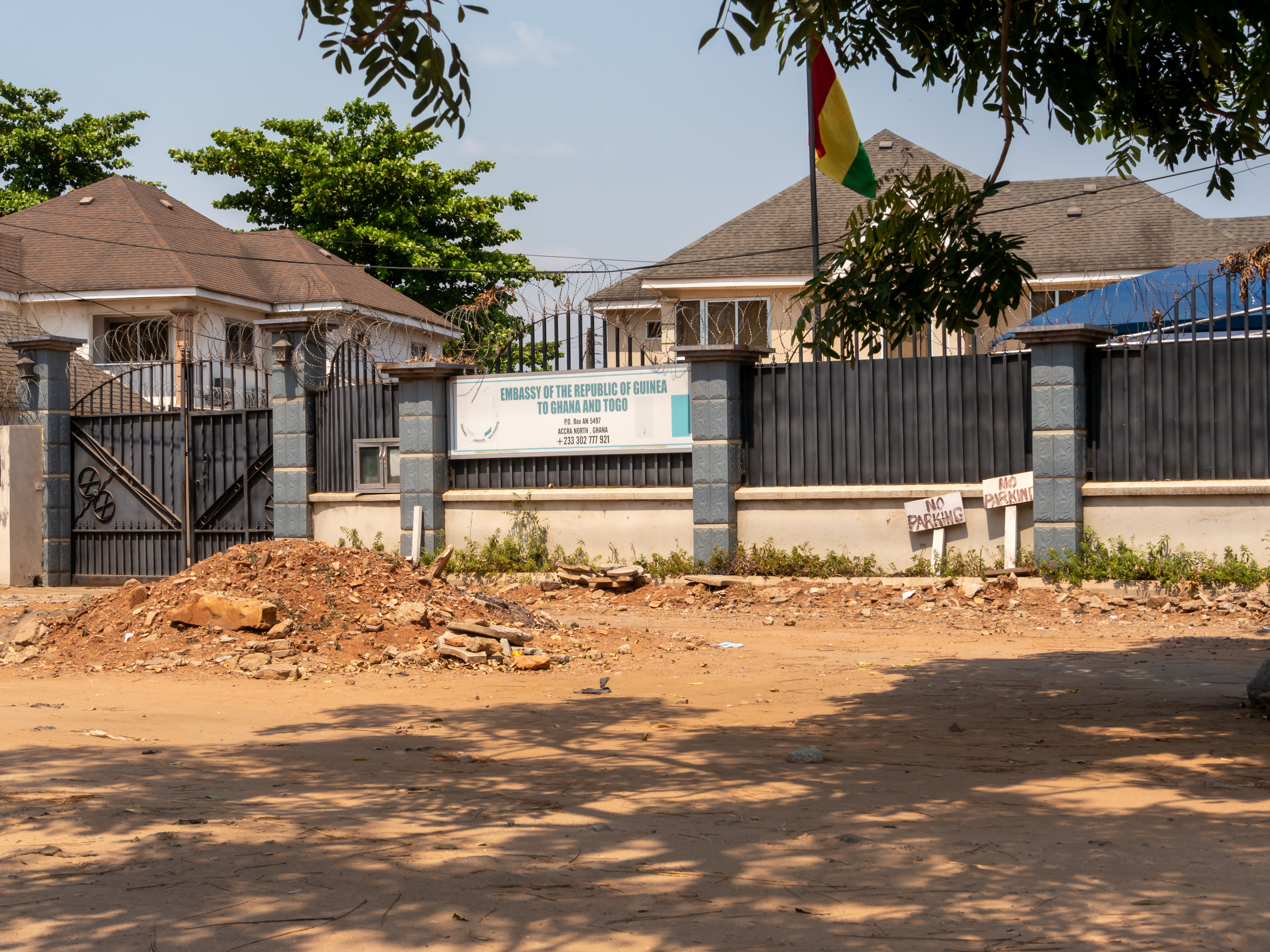
Embassy of Guinea

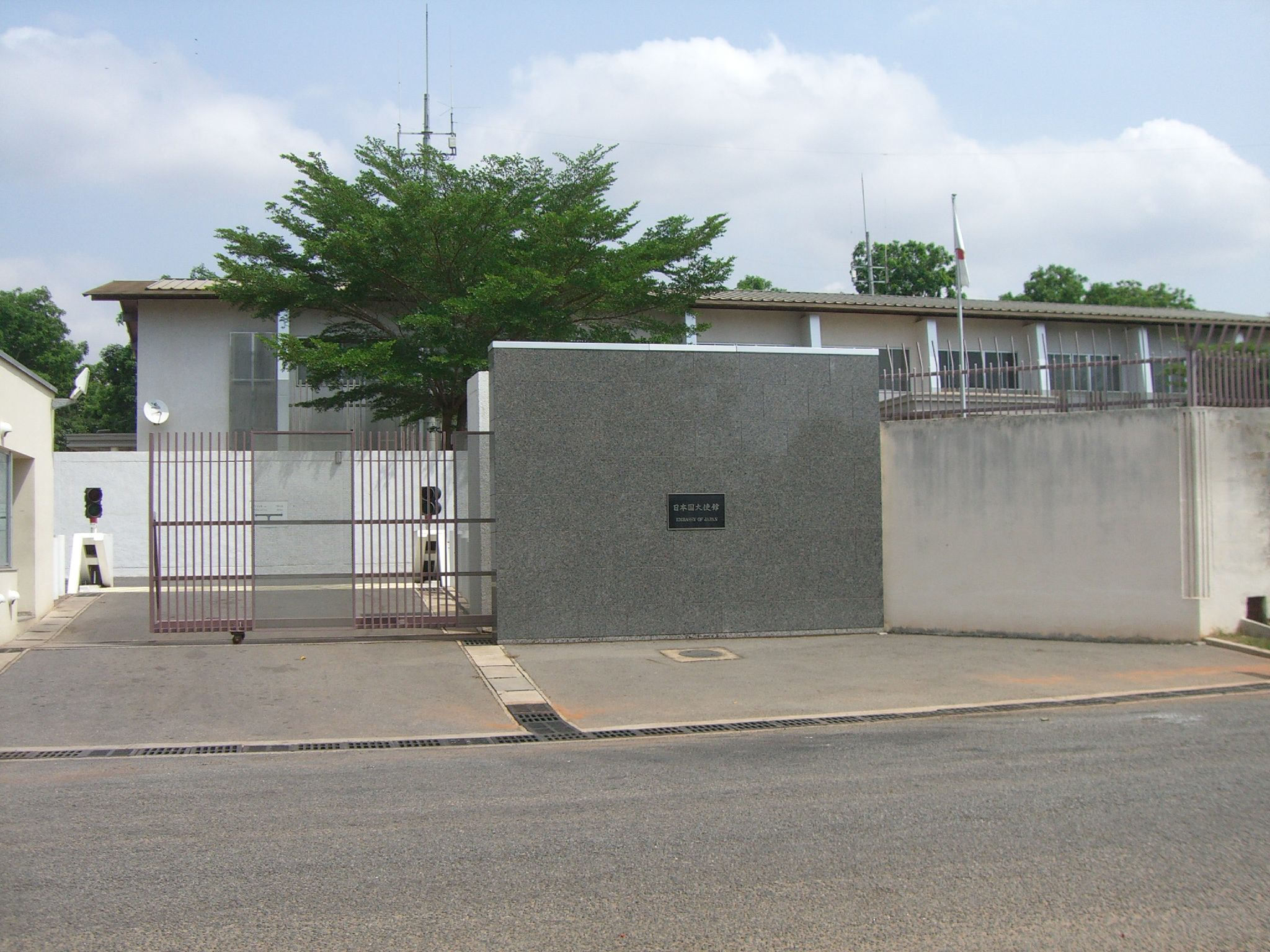
Embassy of Japan

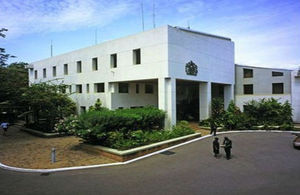
High Commission of the United Kingdom

== Consulate-General in Kumasi, Ashanti Region ==
1. Burkina Faso

== Non-Resident Embassies and High Commissions accredited to Ghana ==
=== Resident in Abidjan, Ivory Coast ===
1. Belgium
2. Cameroon
3. Djibouti
4. Mauritania
5. Portugal

=== Resident in Abuja, Nigeria ===
1. Argentina
2. Belarus
3. Botswana
4. Bulgaria
5. Burundi
6. Finland
7. Gambia
8. Greece
9. Indonesia
10. Ireland
11. Jamaica
12. Philippines
13. Poland
14. Romania
15. Slovakia
16. Sweden
17. Tanzania
18. Thailand
19. Trinidad and Tobago
20. Tunisia
21. Uganda
22. Vietnam

=== Resident in Addis Ababa, Ethiopia ===
1. Kazakhstan
2. New Zealand
3. Seychelles

=== Resident in Rabat, Morocco ===
1. Dominican Republic
2. Panama
3. Paraguay

=== Resident in other cities ===
1. Armenia (Cairo)
2. Chad (Cotonou)
3. Croatia (London)
4. Cyprus (Cairo)
5. Gabon (Lomé)
6. Iceland (Reykjavík)
7. Nepal (Cairo)
8. Nicaragua (Ouagadougou)
9. Oman (Algiers)
10. Singapore (Singapore)
11. Sri Lanka (Nairobi)
12. Uruguay (Pretoria)
13. Venezuela (Cotonou)
14. Yemen (Khartoum)

=== Unverified ===
- Jordan (Algiers)
- Lesotho (Tripoli)
- Madagascar (Dakar)
- Malawi (Addis Ababa)

== Closed missions ==
Host city	Sending country	Mission	Year closed	Ref.
Accra	Albania	Embassy	1966	
Accra	Argentina	Embassy	1968	
Accra	Belgium	Embassy	Unknown	
Accra	Benin	Embassy	Unknown	
Accra	Bulgaria	Embassy	2011	
Accra	Indonesia	Embassy	1967	
Accra	North Korea	Embassy	1998	
Accra	Poland	Embassy	1993	
Accra	South Sudan	Embassy	2018	
Accra	Vietnam	Embassy	1966	

== Mission to open ==
Host city	Sending country	Mission	Ref.
Accra	Philippines	Embassy	

== See also ==
- List of diplomatic missions of Ghana
- Foreign relations of Ghana
- List of ambassadors and high commissioners of Ghana
- Visa requirements for Ghanaian citizens
