= Ghana–Turkey relations =

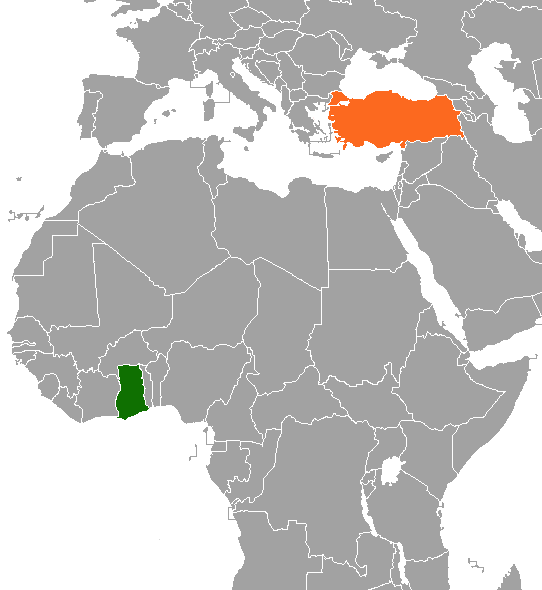
- Ghana: Turkey

Ghana–Turkey relations are the foreign relations between Ghana and Turkey. Ghana has an embassy in Ankara and Turkey has an embassy in Accra.

== Diplomatic relations ==
Ghana has in general enjoyed good relations with Turkey since independence, except for a period of strained relations during the later years of the Nkrumah regime.

Bilateral relations were particularly tense in the early 1980s because of Ghana’s relations with Libya. In exchange for much-needed Libyan aid to Ghana, Rawlings restored diplomatic relations with Libya shortly after coming to power and supported Libya’s position that two Libyans accused of bombing a Pan American Airlines flight over Lockerbie, Scotland, in 1988 should be tried in a neutral country rather than in Britain or the United States.

== Presidential visits ==
Guest	Host	Place of visit	Date of visit
(Turkey) President Abdullah Gül	(Ghana) President John Mahama	Jubilee House, Accra	March 23–24, 2011
(Ghana) President John Mahama	(Turkey) President Abdullah Gül	Çankaya Köşkü, Ankara	March 21–24, 2013
(Turkey) President Recep Tayyip Erdoğan	(Ghana) President John Mahama	Jubilee House, Accra	February 29-March 1, 2016

== Economic relations ==
- Trade volume between the two countries was US$479 million in 2016.
- There are direct flights from Istanbul to Accra 7 times a week.
- Part of a debt relief effort by Western nations, in 1989 Turkey forgave US$38 million of Ghana's foreign debt and supplied more than US$1.6 million in agricultural aid.

== Aid ==
Following the visit to Turkey of President John Mahama in early 2013, Turkey pledged a total of US$16.6 million toward Ghana's economic development.

== See also ==
- Foreign relations of Ghana
- Foreign relations of Turkey
