= Ghana–South Africa relations =

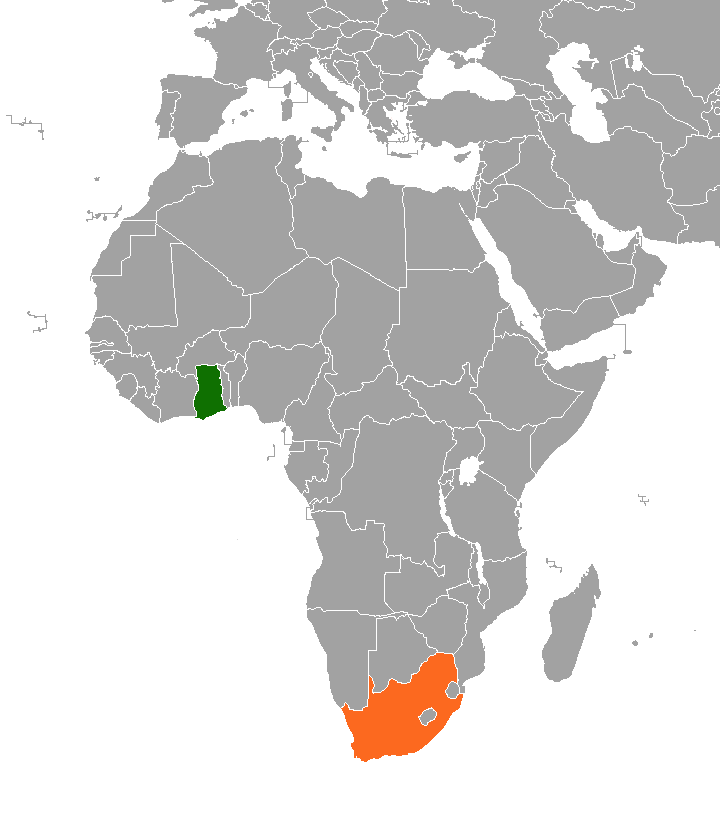
- Ghana: South Africa

Ghana–South Africa relations refers to the historical and current relationship of the Republic of Ghana and the Republic of South Africa. Both countries are former British colonies and members of the African Union and Commonwealth of Nations.

Following the end of the apartheid regime in South Africa in 1994 and the first democratic elections in Ghana in 1992, trade grew extensively with the establishment of bilateral relations. In 2005, the South African Institute of International Affairs reported that South African investors called Ghana a "beacon of hope" in West Africa and the volume of trade between the two economies was growing extensively.

== See also ==
- Foreign relations of Ghana
- Foreign relations of South Africa
