= Vasiliy Bebko =

Ukrainian-Russian diplomat (1932–2022)

- Василий Бебко

USSR/Russian Ambassador to Liberia
- In office 3 September 1987 – 1 November 1992
- Preceded by: Anatoly Ulanov
- Succeeded by: Pavel Pavlov

Personal details
- Born: Vasiliy Stepanovich Bebko; 26 April 1932 Zaporizhzhia, Ukrainian SSR, Soviet Union
- Died: 20 February 2022 (aged 89)
- Education: Russian University of Transport; Poltava National Pedagogical University; Russian Academy of State Service; Diplomatic Academy of the Ministry of Foreign Affairs of the Russian Federation
- Occupation: Diplomat

Vasiliy Stepanovich Bebko (Russian: Василий Степанович Бебко; 26 April 1932 – 20 February 2022) was a Ukrainian-born Russian diplomat. He served as Ambassador of the USSR and later Russia to Liberia from 1987 to 1992.

Bebko died on 20 February 2022, at the age of 89.
