= Colombia–Ghana relations =

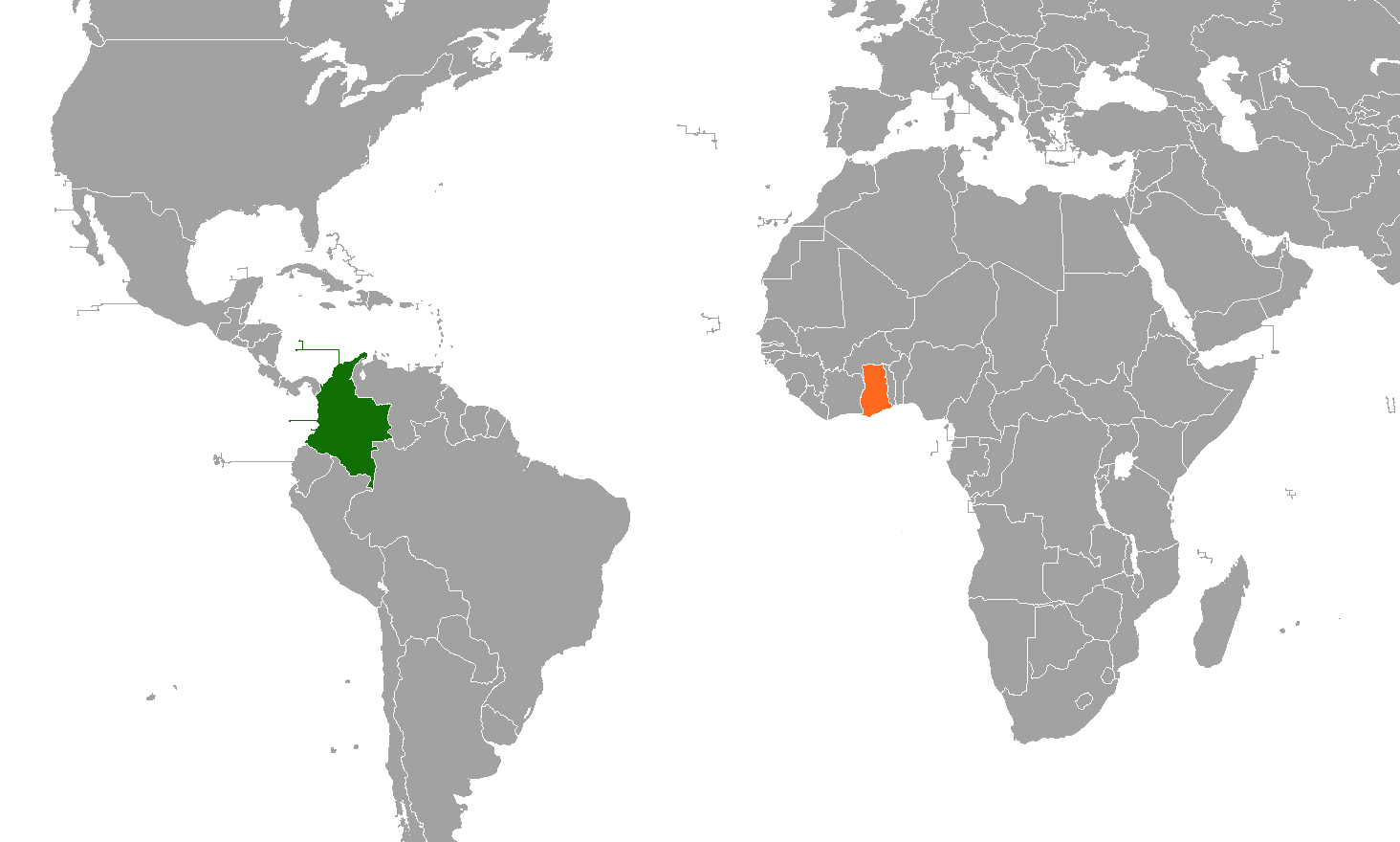
- Colombia: Ghana

Colombia–Ghana relations are the bilateral relations between Colombia and Ghana. The two nations are members of the United Nations and the Non-Aligned Movement.

== History ==
Colombia and Ghana established diplomatic relations on 23 June 1988. In August 2013, the Embassy of Colombia in Ghana was opened together with the members of the Pacific Alliance (Chile, Peru and Mexico), further strengthening Colombia's institutional presence in West Africa. On 20 August of that year, Colombian ambassador Claudia Turbay Quintero presented her credentials to Ghanaian president John Dramani. In 2016, the Ghanaian government welcomed alliance with Colombia to promote peacekeeping. In September 2023, the vice president of Ghana Mahamudu Bawumia held a meeting with the vice president of Colombia, Francia Márquez to strengthen ties between the two countries.

== High-level visits ==
High-level visits from Ghana to Colombia

- Minister of Foreign Affairs and Regional Integration Hanna Serwaah Tetteh (2014)
- President Nana Akufo-Addo (2023)
- Ambassador of Ghana to Brazil Abena Busia (2023)

High-level visits from Colombia to Ghana

- Vice President Francia Márquez (2023)

== Bilateral agreements ==
Both countries have signed several bilateral agreements such as a Memorandum of Understanding on Political Consultations (2014); Cooperation Agreement on the Prevention of Illicit Drug Consumption and the Fight against Illicit Trafficking in Psychotropic Substances, Chemical Precursors, and Related Crimes (2015); Memorandum of Understanding between Coldeportes and the Ministry of Youth and Sports of Ghana (2015); General Cooperation Agreement between the Government of the Republic of Colombia and the Government of the Republic of Ghana on mutual visa exemption for diplomatic, official, and service passports (2016) and a Memorandum of Understanding on Education, Bilingualism, Innovation, Science and Technology with the Republic of Ghana (2023).

== Trade ==
In 2022, Ghana exported $3.66M to Colombia. The products exported from Ghana to Colombia were Raw Lead ($3.65M), Basketwork ($6.86k), and Ornamental Ceramics ($396). Colombia exported $3.26M to Ghana. The products exported from Colombia to Ghana included Garden Tools ($912k), Lifting Machinery ($816k), and Raw Sugar ($422k).

== Resident diplomatic missions ==
- Colombia has an embassy in Accra.
- Ghana has an honorary consulate in Bogotá.

== See also ==
- Foreign relations of Ghana
- Foreign relations of Colombia
