= Denmark–Ghana relations =

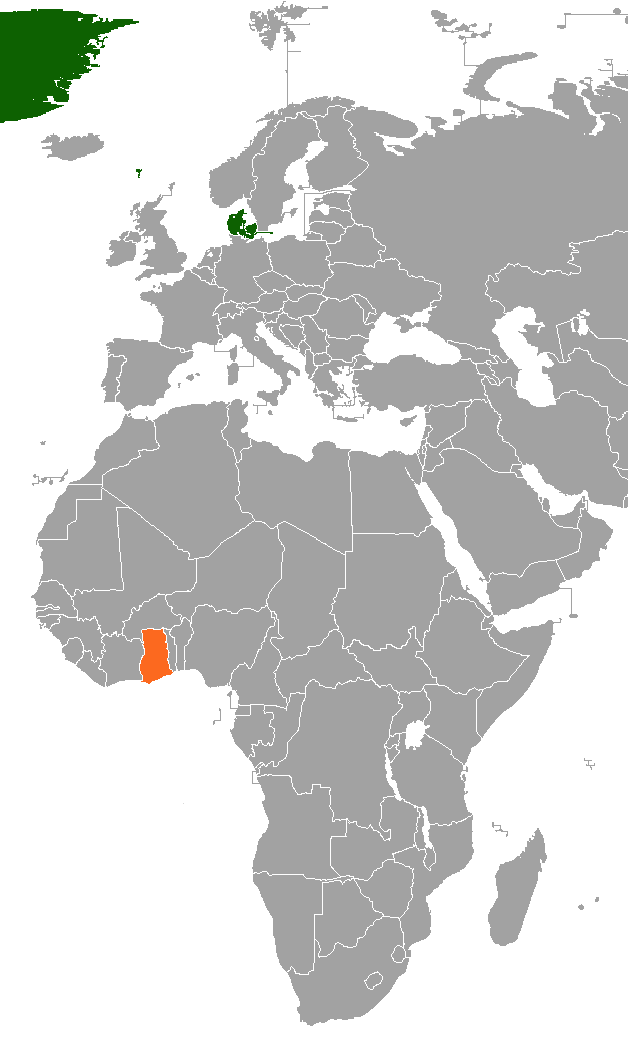
- Denmark: Ghana

Relations between Denmark and Ghana date back to 1660, when Danes settled the Gold Coast. Bilateral relations are described as warm and strong. Denmark has an embassy in Accra and Ghana has an embassy in Copenhagen. Denmark has assisted Ghana with development since 1958.

== Trade ==
In 2007, Danish exports to Ghana amounted to 108 million DKK, while Ghanaian export to Denmark amounted to 210 million DKK.

== Development assistance ==
From 1958, Denmark assisted Ghana with development. The development assistance stopped in the end of the 1970s to 1983. Ghana was chosen as a Danish programme country in 1990. Denmark assists Ghana with economic development, peace and stability, health, transport, support to the private sector and the fight against poverty.

== See also ==
- Foreign relations of Denmark
- Foreign relations of Ghana
- Danish Gold Coast
