= Ghana–Spain relations =

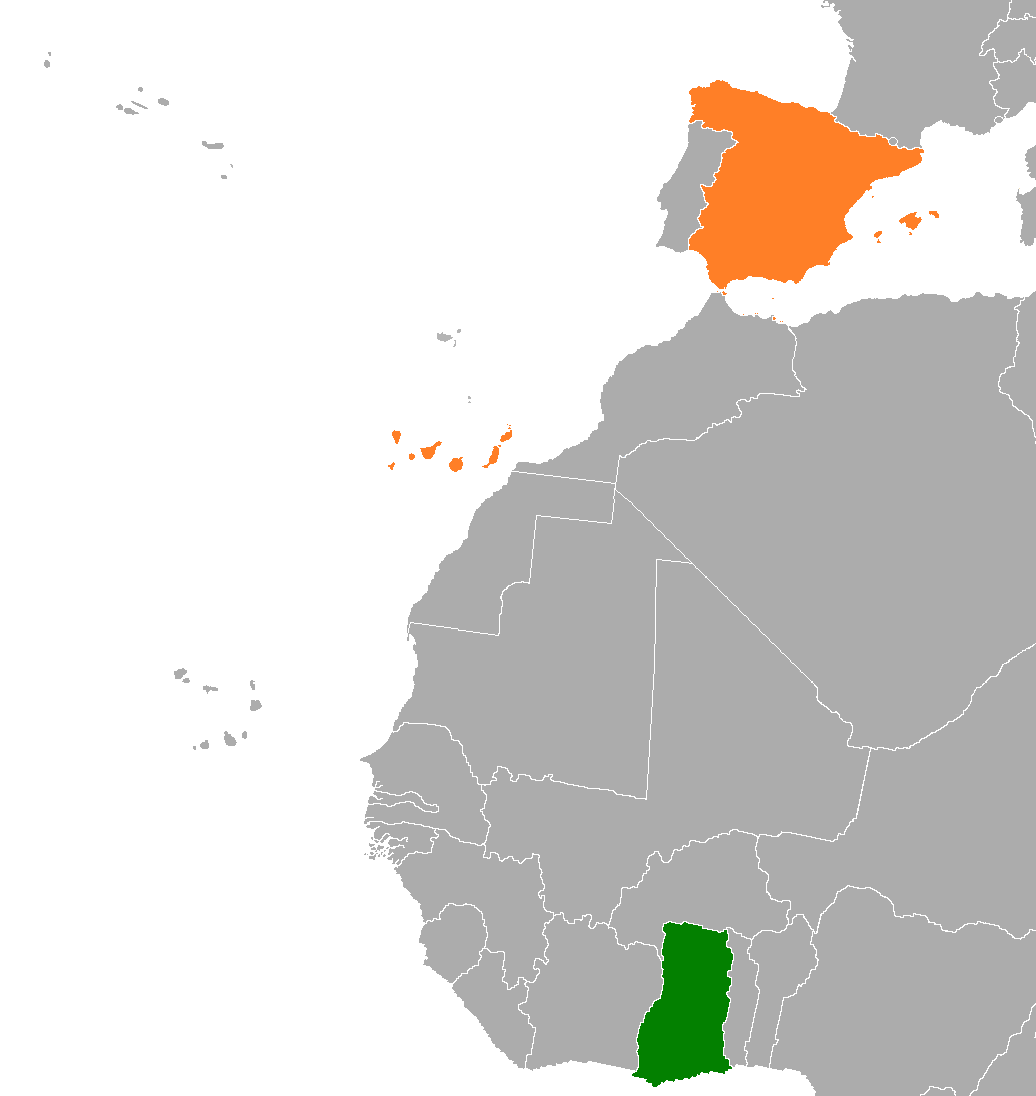
- Ghana: Spain

Ghana–Spain relations are the bilateral relations between Ghana and Spain. Ghana has an embassy in Madrid since March 2024 and a consulate in Barcelona. Spain has an embassy in Accra.

== Diplomatic relations ==
Spain established diplomatic relations with the Republic of Ghana on November 10, 1967. Since then, relations between the two countries have been cordial. Spain who opened an embassy in 2008, with the opening of the Economic and Commercial Office in Accra .

The bilateral relationship is grounded on the basis of the good image that Spain has in Ghana, and the concern of Spanish foreign policy to increase the effective presence of Spain in Africa, and particularly in West Africa.

== Economic relations ==
Traditionally unimportant economic relations began to gain importance in 2011 in both investment and commerce, whether of goods or services. Ghana is increasingly attracting more attention from Spanish companies.

== Cooperation ==
Ghana has not traditionally been a priority country for Spanish cooperation, nor is it listed as such in the Master Plan (2012-2016). Therefore, bilateral Spanish cooperation is scarce. However, said Master Plan indicates that “West Africa will be considered a priority region for Spanish Cooperation”, which “will launch a regional cooperation program, endowed of structure, with a multilateral (ECOWAS) and a bilateral side ”and that“ mechanisms that allow countries to make the most of the multilateral funds allocated to the region ”will be reinforced.

== See also ==
- Foreign relations of Ghana
- Foreign relations of Spain
