= Ghana–Malaysia relations =

- Ghana: Malaysia

Ghana–Malaysia relations refers to bilateral foreign relations between Ghana and Malaysia. Ghana has a high commission in Kuala Lumpur, and Malaysia has a high commission in Accra.

== Historical relations ==
Ghana and Malaysia both gained independence from Britain in 1957, Ghana on 6 March and Malaysia on 31 August. At the time, their economies were at similar levels of development. However, by 1965, Malaysia’s GDP per capita had surpassed Ghana’s, marking the beginning of a significant economic divergence. During the early years, both nations had comparable GDPs and economic structures, relying on primary exports—Malaysia on tin and rubber, Ghana on cocoa, gold, and timber. Despite early similarities, their economic trajectories diverged, partly due to Malaysia’s consistent political stability compared to Ghana’s history of coups and instability.

== Economic relations ==
In 1957, Malaysia's real GDP was $18.8 billion, slightly above Ghana’s $16 billion, but Ghana’s per capita GDP was initially higher. By 2017, Malaysia’s per capita GDP had grown nearly seven times that of Ghana. Factors such as economic policies, industrialization, and population control contributed to Malaysia's faster growth. Between 1957 and 2017, Malaysia’s economy grew at an average of 6.37% annually, while Ghana’s grew at 3.99%.

In 2014, several documents were signed by both countries to boost economic co-operation such as the promotion and the protecting of investments. Some Ghanaian construction professionals visited Malaysia to learn more about regulations, health and safety, issuance of permits, planning practices, procurement and infrastructure development. A Ghana-Malaysia business council was also launched to boost the economic opportunities in Ghana.

In 2016, Ghana was one of Malaysia’s key trading partners in Africa, as bilateral trade reached $337 million. Malaysia collaborated with Ghanaian institutions like the Ghana Investment Promotion Centre (GIPC) to boost investment, and Ghanaian businesses were encouraged to explore opportunities in Malaysia.

In October 2023, the Malaysia-Ghana Trade Forum in Kuala Lumpur led to a Memorandum of Understanding (MoU) between the Malaysian International Chamber of Commerce and Industry (MICCI) and the Ghana Investment Promotion Centre to boost investment in tourism, ICT, and health sectors.

In June 2024, Malaysia’s Oil Palm Production Council visited Ghana, inviting it to join a network to enhance its palm oil sector. At a stakeholder engagement in Accra, Malaysia’s Palm Oil Association pledged support for Ghana’s ambition to become Africa’s leading palm oil producer. Discussions focused on technological advancements, sustainability, and market competitiveness, particularly within the African Continental Free Trade Area.

== Political relations ==
Ghana and Malaysia collaborate within multilateral organizations such as the United Nations, the Group of 77, and the Commonwealth.

== Cultural relations ==
The Malaysian High Commission in Ghana promotes cultural cooperation, especially in music and arts. The diplomat Farhan Areffin has praised Ghanaian cuisine and highlighted the potential of Ghanaian music in global markets. Under the Malaysian Technical Cooperation Programme (MTCP), Malaysia provides training and scholarships to Ghanaians, strengthening Ghana’s human resource development. This initiative is part of broader South-South cooperation efforts.

In 2020, Malaysia’s population consisted mainly of Malays (over 50%), Chinese (22%), and Indians (6.7%), while Ghana’s largest ethnic groups were the Akans (47.5%), Mole-Dagbon (16.6%), and Ewes (13.9%). Religion played a key role in both societies; Malaysia was majority Muslim (61%) while Ghana was predominantly Christian (71.2%).

Malaysia has sought to position Ghana as an esports hub for Africa, leveraging its expertise in digital industries. The halal industry has emerged as a potential sector for collaboration, with increasing demand due to Ghana’s growing Muslim population. Islamic banking is also being explored, with the Bank of Ghana studying Malaysia’s systems.
