= List of ambassadors of Russia to Liberia =

Ambassador of the Russian Federation to the Republic of Liberia
- Emblem of the Russian Foreign Ministry
- Incumbent; Sergey Berdnikov since 17 May 2021
- Ministry of Foreign Affairs; Embassy of Russia in Accra
- Style: His Excellency; The Honourable
- Reports to: Minister of Foreign Affairs
- Seat: Accra
- Appointer: President of Russia
- Term length: At the pleasure of the president
- Website: Embassy of Russia in Ghana

The ambassador of Russia to Liberia is the official representative of the president and the government of the Russian Federation to the president and the government of Liberia.

The ambassador and his staff work at large in the Russian embassy in Accra. The current Russian ambassador to Liberia is Sergey Berdnikov, incumbent since 17 May 2021. The ambassador to Liberia is a non-resident ambassador, who has dual accreditation as the ambassador to Ghana since 1999.

== History of diplomatic relations ==
Diplomatic relations between the Soviet Union and Liberia were established on 11 January 1956, though the embassy in Monrovia was not opened until 1972. Dmitry Safonov was appointed as the first ambassador on 7 September 1972. Relations were briefly severed between July 1985, and 1986, with the Soviet embassy reopening in 1987. It was again closed in 1990, and the embassy staff evacuated, due to the outbreak of the First Liberian Civil War. The exchange of representatives was re-established in 1999, with the incumbent ambassador to Ghana, Pavel Pavlov, given dual accreditation as the non-resident ambassador to Liberia, a practice which has since continued.

== List of representatives of Russia to Liberia (1972 –present) ==
=== Soviet Union to Liberia (1972 – 1991) ===
Name	Title	Appointment	Termination	Notes
Dmitry Safonov	Ambassador	7 September 1972	12 November 1977	Credentials presented on 8 December 1972
Anatoly Ulanov	Ambassador	12 November 1977	7 June 1984	Declared persona non grata Returned to the Soviet Union on 22 November 1983
Vasiliy Bebko	Ambassador	3 September 1987	25 December 1991	
First Liberian Civil War - embassy staff evacuated in 1990

=== Russian Federation to Liberia (1991–present) ===
Name	Title	Appointment	Termination	Notes
Vasiliy Bebko	Ambassador	25 December 1991	2 November 1992	
Pavel Pavlov	Ambassador	6 April 1999	4 April 2002	Concurrently ambassador to Ghana
Valery Orlov	Ambassador	15 April 2002	26 July 2006	Concurrently ambassador to Ghana
Andrey Pokrovsky	Ambassador	12 September 2006	28 February 2009	Concurrently ambassador to Ghana; Died in post
Vladimir Barbin	Ambassador	23 December 2009	30 May 2014	Concurrently ambassador to Ghana
Dmitry Slusov	Ambassador	30 May 2014	17 May 2021	Concurrently ambassador to Ghana; Credentials presented on 26 March 2015
Sergey Berdnikov	Ambassador	23 November 2021		Concurrently ambassador to Ghana
