= List of ambassadors of Russia to Ghana =

Ambassador of the Russian Federation to the Republic of Ghana
- Emblem of the Russian Foreign Ministry
- Incumbent; Sergey Berdnikov since 17 May 2021
- Ministry of Foreign Affairs; Embassy of Russia in Accra
- Style: His Excellency; The Honourable
- Reports to: Minister of Foreign Affairs
- Seat: Accra
- Appointer: President of Russia
- Term length: At the pleasure of the president
- Website: Embassy of Russia in Ghana

The ambassador of Russia to Ghana is the official representative of the president and the government of the Russian Federation to the president and the government of Ghana.

The ambassador and his staff work at large in the Russian embassy in Accra. The current Russian ambassador to Ghana is Sergey Berdnikov, incumbent since 17 May 2021. The ambassador to Ghana has dual accreditation as the non-resident ambassador to Liberia since 1999.

== History of diplomatic relations ==
Formal diplomatic relations between Ghana and the Soviet Union were established on 14 January 1958. The Soviet embassy in Accra opened in 1959, with the Ghanaian embassy in Moscow opening in 1960. Mikhail Sytenko was appointed as the first ambassador on 24 April 1959. With the dissolution of the Soviet Union in 1991, Ghana recognised the Russian Federation as its successor state. The incumbent Soviet ambassador, Vladimir Tokin, continued as ambassador from Russia until 1997.

Diplomatic relations between the Soviet Union and Liberia were established on 11 January 1956, though the embassy in Monrovia was not opened until 1972. Relations were briefly severed between July 1985, and 1986, with the Soviet embassy reopening in 1987. It was again closed in 1990, and the embassy staff evacuated, due to the outbreak of the First Liberian Civil War. The exchange of representatives was re-established in 1999, with the incumbent ambassador to Ghana, Pavel Pavlov, given dual accreditation as the non-resident ambassador to Liberia, a practice which has since continued.

== List of representatives of Russia to Ghana (1959 –present) ==
=== Soviet Union to Ghana (1959 – 1991) ===
Name	Title	Appointment	Termination	Notes
Mikhail Sytenko	Ambassador	24 April 1959	1 November 1962	Credentials presented on 14 August 1959
Georgy Rodionov	Ambassador	1 November 1962	28 December 1967	Credentials presented on 26 November 1962
Vasily Safronchuk	Ambassador	28 December 1967	10 July 1971	Credentials presented on 14 March 1968
Vladimir Cherednik	Ambassador	10 July 1971	3 May 1974	Credentials presented on 6 November 1971
Yury Bernov	Ambassador	3 May 1974	30 September 1979	Credentials presented on 24 May 1974
Anatoly Ivantsov	Ambassador	30 September 1979	14 March 1984	Credentials presented on 27 December 1979
Vyacheslav Semyonov	Ambassador	14 March 1984	30 June 1989	Credentials presented on 30 March 1984
Yevgeny Ostrovenko	Ambassador	30 June 1989	17 August 1991	
Vladimir Tokin	Ambassador	17 August 1991	25 December 1991	

=== Russian Federation to Ghana (1991–present) ===
Name	Title	Appointment	Termination	Notes
Vladimir Tokin	Ambassador	25 December 1991	6 September 1997	
Pavel Pavlov	Ambassador	6 September 1997	4 April 2002	
Valery Orlov	Ambassador	4 April 2002	26 July 2006	
Andrey Pokrovsky	Ambassador	26 July 2006	28 February 2009	Died in post
Vladimir Barbin	Ambassador	4 December 2009	30 May 2014	
Dmitry Slusov	Ambassador	30 May 2014	17 May 2021	Credentials presented on 29 August 2014
Sergey Berdnikov	Ambassador	17 May 2021		Credentials presented on 25 June 2021
