= Ghana–Kenya relations =

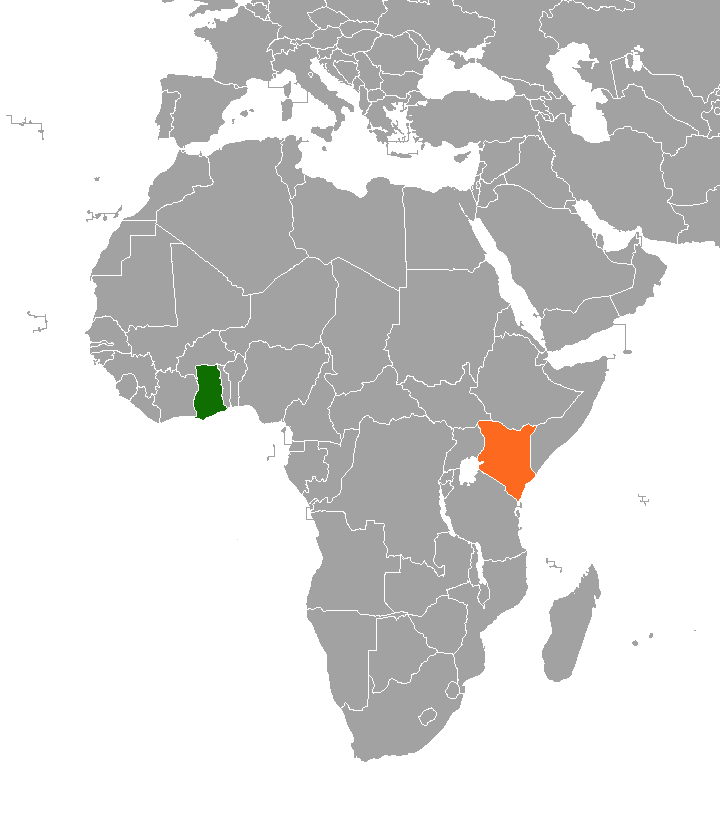
- Ghana: Kenya

Ghana–Kenya relations are the bilateral relations between Ghana and Kenya. Ghana is a partner of Kenya in many areas, particularly trade, agriculture and energy. Both countries are members of the African Union, Group of 77, Commonwealth of Nations and Non-Aligned Movement.

== History ==
Ties between both countries date back to the pre-colonial days when Ghana's first President Kwame Nkrumah and Kenya's first President Jomo Kenyatta were united in anti-colonial crusades. When Ghana got independence in 1957, it encouraged the anti-colonial struggle in Kenya and other African nations. Kenya achieved independence later on in 1963.

== Cooperation ==
In January 2014, during the African Union (AU) meeting in Addis Ababa, both countries signed an agreement that will boost economic growth and technical cooperation. The agreement signed on Wednesday encourages cooperation in trade and investment, energy and mineral resources, agriculture and livestock development. It will also promote cooperation in education, health, tourism and culture, science and technology, security and military cooperation, foreign affairs, legal and judicial matters.

There were a total of seven agreements signed between both countries during President Mahama's state visit to Kenya in December 2014. The agreements were aimed at easing the conditions for doing business and increasing the volume of trade between the two countries as well as increasing overall intra-African trade.

== Developments ==
Notable trade enhancement developments between both countries have taken off with the establishment of the Kenya Trade Expo Ghana. The Kenya Trade Expo in Ghana is fostered by the Trade Agreements signed between Ghana and Kenya, by then president John Mahama of Ghana and Uhuru Kenyatta of Kenya. The first Annual Kenya Trade Expo in Ghana took place in 2015, attracting a crowd of emerging and established business people, government and non-government officials and supporters.

The three-day expo ran under the theme: “The Role of Pan-African Investments in Ghana’s Growth”. The expo was officially opened by then President of Ghana, H.E John Dramani Mahama. The second one was held in 2017 under the theme "Breaking New Frontiers in Intra-Africa Trade." Ghana and Kenya are uniquely positioned to act as role models to other African Nations, of how Intra-Africa trade can strengthen our Africans Economies." said Mrs. Leah Nduati-Lee who co-founded the event with Mr. Nana Yao Lee. "Kenyans and Ghanaians can profitably engage in knowledge sharing, joint ventures and partnerships." she added.

== Resident diplomatic missions ==
- Ghana has a high commission in Nairobi.
- Kenya has a high commission in Accra.
