= Ghana–Jamaica relations =

Ghanaian–Jamaican relations
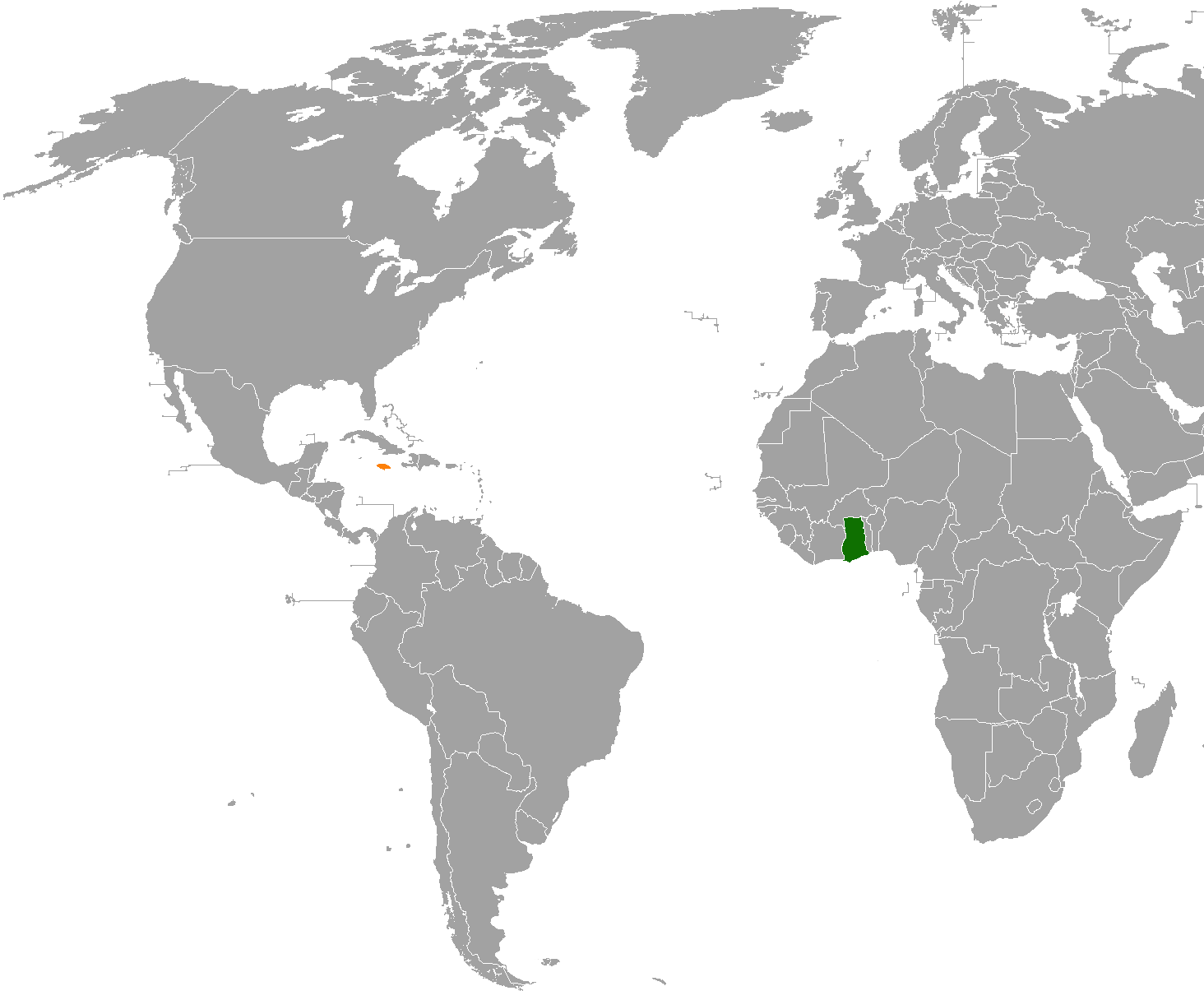

- Ghana: Jamaica

Ghana–Jamaica relations refers to the bilateral relations between Ghana and Jamaica. Both nations are members of the United Nations, however neither country has a resident ambassador.

Ghana and Jamaica have a Joint Permanent Commission, and there are plans for Ghanaian investment in Jamaica.

== History ==
Ghana, as the former Gold Coast, and Jamaica share historical links through the slave trade and forced Ashanti/Akan emigration to the Caribbean.
