= Ghana Investment Promotion Centre =

Ghanaian institution

Agency overview
- Formed: 1994
- Agency executives: Mr. Simon Madjie, CEO; Yofi Grant, Former CEO
- Website: https://gipc.gov.gh/

The Ghana Investment Promotion Centre commonly known as (GIPC) is the Government of Ghana agency established to encourage, promote and facilitate investments in all sectors of the economy of Ghana except mining and petroleum which are handled by the Ghana Chamber of Mines and the Ghana National Petroleum Corporation.

== Operations ==
The Centre is mandated to promote investment as a means of supporting Ghana’s economic development. Established under the Ghana Investment Promotion Centre Act, 2013 (Act 865), the Centre is responsible for facilitating and encouraging both domestic and foreign investment, with the objective of contributing to economic growth and national development.

The Centre aims to foster activities that would make Ghana accessible for global transactions. The centre has Four areas in which it operates, namely Investment Promotion, Investment Facilitation, Investment Advocacy and Aftercare Services and the focused sectors are Agriculture and Agro Processing, Oil and Gas, Health, ICT and Fintech, Manufacturing, Mining and Mineral Processing, Property Development, Recreation and Tourism, Energy, Education, Financial Services and Transport.

== Management ==
The Ghana Investment Promotion Centre serves as a critical agency in Ghana's efforts to attract investments, stimulate economic growth, and create employment opportunities. Its management board plays a significant role in shaping the policies and strategies that drive investment promotion and facilitation in the country.

Mr. Alex Apau Dadey is the board chairman and Mr. Reginald Yofi Grant is chief executive officer.

=== Leadership ===
- Mr. Simon Madjie - CEO 2025
- Yofi Grant - Former CEO

== Awards and recognition ==
GIPC has won several awards including the following:

- Excellent Award in Investment Promotion in 2018 at the Meet the farmers conference
- Best Investment Promotion Agency in West and Central Africa in 2017, 2018, 2019, 2020, 2022 at the annual Investment meeting awards.
- Best Investment Promotion Agency in Africa 2017, 2018, and 2021 by Capital Finance International
- Best Investment Promotion Agency in Africa 2022 by CFL.CO Awards
- Best FDI Destination in Africa in 2022 by International investor awards

== See also ==
- Investment promotion agency
