= Nana Akufo-Addo administration controversies =

Presidential controversies

Nana Addo Dankwa Akufo-Addo took office as Ghana's president on 7 January 2017 after winning the December 2016 presidential elections. A number of controversies have arisen under his administration.

== Plagiarism of inauguration speech ==
Nana Akufo-Addo was accused of lifting parts of his inauguration speech from previous addresses given by former US presidents Bill Clinton and George W Bush. This led to a public uproar with some deeming it as an embarrassment to the country and calling for the sacking of the speechwriter or for someone to take responsibility. The Director of Communication at the Presidency subsequently issued an apology. Some public figures also called for Ghanaians to disregard the incident. Akufo-Addo has since referred to the incident in jest at a thanksgiving service he attended.

== Official Residence And Office for former president John Dramani Mahama ==
Immediately after Nana Akufo-Addo was sworn in, a letter dated 19 December 2016 signed by Julius Debrah, former chief of staff, became public. It contained a message that former President John Dramani Mahama would want to keep Bungalow No 3 in Accra and its adjoining facilities as his retirement home and Bungalow No 6 in Accra as his office.

There were also claims in the media that Mahama wanted to buy the house he currently resides in, which he rebutted with a statement dated Tuesday 10 January, and further withdrawing his request completely. Akufo-Addo commended Mahama for withdrawing his request to the residential and office accommodation.

== Bribery among parliamentary appointment committee members ==
An NDC MP for Bawku Central and member of the appointment committee responsible for vetting ministerial appointees alleged that members of the minority on the committee were offered Gh¢ 30,000 (7,000 US Dollars) to influence their judgement and facilitate the approval of energy minister designate Boakye Agyarko. Two minority MPs, Alhassan Suhiyini and Samuel Okudzeto Ablakwa have publicly corroborated Ayariga's claim and jointly petitioned the speaker of parliament to probe the matter.

Ablakwa further claimed that four other minority MPs, Sampson Ahi, Eric Opoku, Nii Lante Vanderpuye and Yiele Chireh, questioned the source of the money since it was not part of their sitting allowance, and fearing it could be a bribe also promptly returned it. Ayariga's allegations also revealed that the money was handed out to the MPs by the minority chief whip Muntaka Mubarak as coming from chairman of the vetting committee Joe Osei Owusu in favour of the energy minister designate. As of 30 January 2017 all accused persons in the chain of giving the bribe have denied any involvement.

== Boycott of voting process for minister designate Otiko Afisa Djaba ==
Opposition to the nomination of Otiko Afisa Djaba to become minister for Gender, Children and Social Protection by minority legislators led to the speaker of the house subjugating her approval to a secret balloting among members of the floor of parliament. The minority walked out of the voting process. Their major concern was that she refused to apologize to the ministerial appointment committee for referring to John Mahama in her capacity as national women's organizer of NPP during a political rally in 2016 at Asawase as "extremely wicked", "evil", "corrupt", "a failure" and "an embarrassment" to northerners, adding that "he is a violent person" with the "heart of a devil" and another tenure for John Mahama will result in "years of more corruption, unemployment and poverty".

She maintains that her comments were non-provocative and that she does "not owe anybody an apology", continuing to insist on her use of the same language to describe the former president. Other concerns were that Afisa Djaba backed assertions that Electoral Commission chairperson Charlotte Osei was appointed to her position in exchange for sex.

Issues were also raised about the failure of Afisa Djaba to do her one-year mandatory national service to the country in violation of The Ghana National Service Scheme Act 426 section 7 which states that "a person who has not commenced and completed his or her period of national service shall not; (b) be employed by any other person outside the Scheme". Otiko Afisa Djaba obtained 152 favorable votes in excess of the 50% required to secure her the position.

== The proposed use of the Heritage Fund to implement the free SHS education policy ==
President Nana Addo Dankwa Akufo-Addo stated that government would fund the cost of public senior high schools (SHS) for all those who qualify for entry from the 2017/2018 academic year onward. Questions as to how the ruling government would fund this policy have been raised. Policy Think Tank, IMANI Ghana has already questioned how the government will fund the policy. However, former Director-General of the Ghana Education Service, Charles Aheto-Tsegah said the government's decision to roll out the free Senior High School education policy this year is feasible but there must be some changes in the national budgetary expenditure.

Senior minister, Honourable Yaw Osafo Marfo, said the Heritage Fund which receives nine percent of the country's annual petroleum revenue will be used to sustain the program. Minority leader, Haruna Iddrisu disagreed saying government's decision to tap into reserved oil revenue (Heritage Fund) to finance its free senior high school (SHS) policy would be fatal for Ghana's future because it might compromise the safety of the country as it was set aside to serve as a buffer during challenging economic times.

The President said, "By free SHS, we mean that in addition to tuition, which is already free, there will be no admission fees, no library fees, no science center fees, no computer laboratory fees, no examination fees, no utility fees. There will be free textbooks, free boarding and free meals and day students will get a meal at school for free. Free SHS will also cover agricultural, vocational and technical institutions at the high school level".

== Large size of government with 110 ministers of state ==
In 2017, Akuffo Addo swore in 110 ministers, the largest ever government in Ghana since the beginning of the fourth republic. The appointments included three deputies for ministries like Finance, Information, Local Government and Rural Development as well as Energy. The Minority leader of the opposition National Democratic Congress, Haruna Iddrissu described the large size of the government as "elephant-sized", matching the elephant in the party symbol. He stated that the large size would put pressure on public funds. Other members of the minority in parliament and some government organisations raised some concerns about the size of the government.

Pressure group Occupy Ghana criticised the government, arguing that the President would be promoting corruption with the large number of ministers he chose to work with, and questioned the commitment of the President to protecting the public purse. Responding in the media about a large size government for a small country such as Ghana, the then Minister for Information Mustapha Hamid jabbed at critics stating that "We never promised a lean government". The information minister further indicated that the only way to solve the huge problems created by the erstwhile administration and to fulfill their promises is by appointing an army of ministers.

== Breaking of Laws by vigilante groups ==
Vigilante groups loyal to the government known as the Delta Force went on rampage and forcefully ejected the nominee as Ashanti regional security coordinator nominated by the president. Again, the Delta Force group stormed the circuit court in Kumasi and forcefully freed 13 members of their group who had been arrested by the Ghana Police for acts of vandalism and lawlessness in court custody.

== Release of the 'Delta Force 8' ==
Eight members of the NPP's vigilante group, Delta Force accused of facilitating the escape of members of the group from lawful custody and were standing trial for allegedly assaulting the Regional Security Coordinator, Mr George Agyei as well destroying property at the Ashanti Regional Coordinating Council (ARCC) have had all charges against them dropped. The Attorney General concluded that there was insufficient evidence against the accused persons, hence the need for the case to be dropped.

== BOST Contaminated Fuel Scandal ==
The Bulk Oil Storage and Transportation (BOST) was in the news to have sold 5 million litres of contaminated fuel to an unlicensed company Movepiina and Zup Oil which is alleged to have caused Ghana to lose 7 million Ghana Cedis in revenue. The Minister of Energy Mr. Boakye Agyarko came out to say the BNI has cleared BOST of any wrongdoing which the Minority in Parliament believes it was a cover up by the Government in the contaminated fuel saga.

== US$2.25 Billion Bond Saga ==
The Finance Minister of Ghana Mr Ofori-Atta's in April 2017 issued a US$2.25 Billion bond. The minority in Parliament, National Democratic Congress called for a probe into the bond for lack of transparency, a tendency of the bond affecting the welfare of Ghanaians and a possible conflict of interest involving the Finance Minister. The minority went on to petition the United States Securities and Exchange Commission (SEC) and summoned the Finance Minister to Parliament. In responding to the claims by the minority, the finance Minister said the process in securing the bond was transparent and went on to defend the bond. The Council of State was accused of negotiating with the Minority to stop pursuing the bond saga, however the Council of State denied ever engaging with the minority on the bond saga.

== Gh¢800k website Saga ==
In December 2017, the Ministry for Special Development and Initiatives (first of its kind formed by the Akuffo Addo Government) headed by Mavis Hawa Koomson budgeted to use Gh¢800,000.00 (200,000 US Dollars) to build a new website. This generated a lot of backlash from the minority in parliament and also sparked a lot of controversy on social media which saw many Ghanaians joining the fray. Despite the uproar the budget was approved due to the ruling party's majority in parliament.

== Kelni-GVG saga ==
The ministry of information on 27 December 2017 led by the minister Ursula Owusu Ekuful awarded Kelni GVG company a controversial contract of US$89.4 million to monitor and track revenues by the TELCOS in Ghana. The said contract generated a lot of controversies among many Ghanaians and the minority in parliament describing it as unnecessary and waste of tax payers money.

== $1M Ministry of Sanitation scandal ==
The Ghanaian Minister of Sanitation and Water Resources, Cecilia Abena Dapaah, resigned on 22 July 2023 following a scandal involving large sums of foreign currency allegedly stolen from her residence by her househelps. In October 2022, Dapaah's two house helps, 18-year-old Patience Botwe and 30-year-old Sarah Agyei, were arrested and charged with stealing $1 million, €300,000, and millions of Ghana cedis from the minister's home between July and October 2022. The two were charged with conspiracy and multiple counts of theft. Although Dapaah said the reported figures were inaccurate, she acknowledged the serious implications of the allegations for someone in her position. The scandal prompted calls for her resignation from the opposition minority leader to allow for an independent investigation into the source of the funds, given her status as an Article 71 public office holder. In her resignation letter to the president, Dapaah cited not wanting the matter to hinder the government's work as her reason for stepping down. She pledged to cooperate fully with investigations and expressed confidence she would be exonerated. Same Minister dredged the Odaw River with $42m USD.

== Australia 2018, 21st Commonwealth Games Visa Scandal ==
The President, Nana Addo Dankwa Akufo-Addo issued a statement to have the Deputy Minister for Youth and Sports, Pius Enam Hadzide alongside the acting Director General of the National Sports Authority, Robert Sarfo Mensah suspended. In a statement signed by Eugene Arhin, the Director of Communications at the Jubilee House, the decision was taken after preliminary investigations conducted into the arrest and deportation of some sixty (60) Ghanaians, who had allegedly attempted to enter Australia by false pretenses in the name of being journalists to cover the ongoing 21st Commonwealth Games in Australia.https://www.ghanaweb.com/GhanaHomePage/NewsArchive/Deputy-Sports-Minister-acting-National-Sports-Authority-D-G-suspended-642651

Two staff of the National Sports Authority (NSA), Hussein Akuetteh Addy and Christine Ashley were detained by the BNI upon their arrival in Ghana from Australia where they were earlier implicated in the running visa scandal for fake journalists. They were granted bail after a brief detention by the Bureau of National Investigations (BNI) but have since been suspended.

== Replacement of the Electoral Commission chair and two Deputies ==
President Nana Akufo-Addo in June 2018 sacked the Chairperson of the Electoral Commission, Charlotte Osei and her two deputies, Amadu Sulley and Georgina Opoku Amankwaa from office.

In pursuant to Article 146(4) of the Constitution, the Chief Justice, Justice Sophia Akuffo set up a committee to investigate separate complaints brought against the three persons by citizens of Ghana, their findings recommended their removal from office on the basis of stated misbehavior and incompetence, pursuant to Article 146 (1) of the Constitution of Ghana.

A statement by then Minister for Information, Mustapha Abdul-Hamid on 28 June 2018, said Akufo-Addo had directed the three persons to hand over their respective schedules to the Director of Human Resources at the commission, while thanking them for their service to the country.

== Statue of Akufo-Addo ==
In November 2024, Akufo-Addo was accused of "self glorification" after he personally unveiled a statue of himself outside the Effia-Nkwanta Regional Hospital in Sekondi-Takoradi.

The statue of the immediate former president of Ghana, Akufo-Addo, has been vandalized few weeks after it unveiled in November.

== See also ==
- Corruption in Ghana
