= Jacob Amekor Blukoo-Allotey =

Ghanaian academic and physician

Jacob Amekor Blukoo-Allotey OOV
- Born: Jacob Amekor Quarshie Blukoo-Allotey; 1929; Gold Coast (now Ghana)
- Died: 2016 (aged 86–87); Ghana
- Education: Accra Academy
- Alma mater: University of Liverpool
- Occupation: Pharmacologist
- Scientific career
- Fields: Medicine, Pharmacology, Pharmaceutical industry

Jacob Amekor Blukoo-Allotey, OOV (1929–2016), was a Ghanaian academic and physician who served as general manager of the GIHOC Pharmaceutical Corporation.

== Early life ==
Blukoo-Allotey attended Accra Academy, where he graduated in 1948. He proceeded to the United Kingdom to study medicine at the University of Liverpool. There, he was the president of the city's Ghana Students' Association. He graduated in 1959, and in 1960, he became a Licensiate of the Royal College of Physicians, London, and a Member of the Royal College of Surgeons of England. He later went to the United States of America on a scholarship to study Pharmacology for his master's degree.

== Career ==
Following his studies in the United Kingdom, Blukoo-Allotey returned to Ghana where he registered as a medical personnel on 12 May 1961. He consequently worked as a physician with the Ministry of Health until the mid-1960s when he took up a job as a lecturer at the Pharmacology department of the University of Ghana Medical School.

While working as a lecturer at the University of Ghana Medical School, he was appointed chairman of the State Pharmaceutical Corporation. In 1968, the corporation became a division of the Ghana Industrial Holdings Corporation (GIHOC) and he acted as general manager of the division. In 1970, he was sent to Europe by the Ghana Industrial Holdings Corporation on a special leave from the University of Ghana. On his return, he was appointed general manager of the State Pharmaceutical division of GIHOC and run a factory.

In 1973, he was a member of the advisory council of the then newly established Centre for Scientific Research into Plant Medicine in Mampong, Akwapim. In 1994, he became council chairman of the Centre for Scientific Research into Plant Medicine, after Charles Easmon, and held this role until 2005.

In 1982, he was appointed member of the then newly formed PNDC government by the then chairman of the PNDC, Jerry John Rawlings. He however declined the appointment, and his request for exemption from the national government was accepted by the then chairman Rawlings.

He was a director on the board of Dannex Limited.

== Honours ==
In 2008, the national award of the Order of the Volta was conferred upon Blukoo-Allotey by the then President of Ghana, John Agyekum Kufuor for his service to Ghana in the field of medicine.

== Personal life ==
Blukoo-Allotey was married to Mrs. Cynthia Blukoo-Allotey (nee Chinery). He was the father of Jean Mensa (née Blukoo-Allotey), the chairperson of the Electoral Commission of Ghana. He was a Christian and a member of the Accra Ridge Church. He died on 7 February 2016 at the age of 87.
