= Josephine Nkrumah =

Ghanaian lawyer

Chairperson of the National Commission for Civic Education
- Incumbent
- Assumed office 2016
- President: John Dramani Mahama
- Preceded by: Charlotte Osei

Deputy Chairperson of the National Commission for Civic Education
- In office 2015–2016

Personal details
- Education: University of Ghana; International Maritime Law Institute
- Profession: Lawyer

Josephine Nkrumah is a Ghanaian lawyer who is a former chairperson of the National Commission for Civic Education in Ghana.

== Education ==
Nkrumah has a Bachelor of Arts degree in Law and French from the University of Ghana, Legon. She was called to the Ghana Bar in February 1997. She also holds a Master's of Law (LLM) Degree from the International Maritime Law Institute (IMO), Malta, specializing in Maritime Law.

== Career ==
Nkrumah was appointed by John Mahama to serve as the deputy chairperson for the National Commission for Civic Education (NCCE) in Ghana in 2015 in charge of Finance and Administration. She was subsequently promoted by John Mahama to serve as the Chairperson of the National Commission for Civic Education in Ghana in 2016 after the chairperson, Charlotte Osei was appointed to be the Chairperson of the Electoral Commission. Josephine Nkrumah has more than 20 years of experience as a legal consultant both in private and public sector.
