= Jean Mensa =

Electoral Commissioner of Ghana

Chairperson of the Electoral Commission of Ghana
- Incumbent
- Assumed office 2018
- President: Nana Addo Dankwa Akufo-Addo
- Preceded by: Charlotte Osei

Personal details
- Born: November 12, 1971 (age 54) Accra, Ghana
- Spouse: Charles Mensa
- Relations: Jacob Amekor Blukoo-Allotey (Father)
- Education: St. Mary's Senior High School
- Alma mater: University of Ghana
- Profession: Lawyer

Jean Adukwei Mensa (née Blukoo-Allotey born November 12, 1971) is a Ghanaian lawyer by profession who has been serving as chairperson of the Electoral Commission of Ghana since July 2018. She was nominated by President Nana Addo Dankwa Akuffo-Addo to take over the chairperson of the Electoral Commission (EC) from her predecessor, Charlotte Osei. Prior to assuming the role of chairperson of the EC, Jean Mensa spent an 18-year career at the Institute of Economic Affairs (IEA), rising to the position of executive director. As the EC chairperson, Jean Mensa declared the then presidential candidate Nana Addo Dankwa Akufo-Addo of the NPP as the president-elect of the December 7th, 2020 Presidential Election.

== Early life and education ==
Jean was born on November 12, 1971, in Accra to Ga parents. Her father is Jacob Blukoo-Allotey, a physician who was awarded the Order of the Volta in 2008. Jean received her secondary education at St. Mary's Senior High School in Accra, after completion of her basic education at Ridge Church School. She studied at the University of Ghana Law school and received her degree in 1993. She was called to the Ghana Bar Association in 1995.

== Career ==
Mensa was appointed as the chairperson of the Electoral Commission of Ghana on 23 July 2018, after her predecessor Charlotte Osei was removed from office. Mensa has been involved in the development of policies, such as the Presidential Transition Act of 2012, the Revised 1992 Constitution of Ghana (draft), the Political Parties Funding Bill, and the Revised Political Parties Bill. Her specialization has been developing and implementing policy alternatives that reflect international best practice but are also tailored to Ghana's needs.

Mensa was sworn in by the President of Ghana, Akufo-Addo. The swearing came in after a Ghanaian citizen, Fafali Nyonatorto, tried to stop the president appointing a new Electoral Commission chair. Nyonatorto challenged the removal of the former Electoral Commission to enable the court to hear her substantive case. The president claimed the removal of the former Chairperson of the Electoral Commission, Charlotte Osei, from her office was carried out with no malice.The president said it was expected of him to discharge the constitutional mandate.

In 2010, Mensa was part of a nine-member constitutional review committee that was set up by the late president John Evans Atta Mills, to review the 1992 constitution. The role of the committee was to consult with Ghanaians on the operation of the 1992 Constitution and on any changes that needed to be made to the constitution. After the review, there was little to no implementation of its recommendations.

Mensa facilitated the IEA's Evening Encounter Series, Ghana's presidential and Vice-Presidential Debates, as well as Town hall meetings for parliamentary candidates. Prior to working at the IEA, Mensa also worked at Amarkai Amarteifio Chambers (1995–1997) and BJ Da Rocha Chambers as a Junior Lawyer (1998).

Mensa has been ranked by the African Network of Entrepreneurs (TANOE) as one of the top sixty corporate women leaders in Ghana (2017). She has won awards including the Excellent Leadership Award by the EXLA Group (2013) and the Young Professional Role Model in Governance Award presented by the Young Professionals and Youth Coalition Initiative (2014).

In July 2023, Mensa was selected as a member of ECOWAS and African Union (AU) Joint Pre-election Fact-finding Mission to Liberia ahead of the country's election on 10 October 2023. She received an award as the chairperson of the Electoral Commission of Ghana for being the best head of a government institution for the Ministries, Departments and Agencies category for 2022 and 2023 audit period.

== Personal life ==
Jean Mensa is married to Dr. Charles Mensa, a former resident director of the Volta Aluminium Company.

== Controversy ==
=== Voter registry ===
The Electoral Commission (EC) chaired by Mensa was cautioned by the former president of Ghana John Mahama not to compile a new voters' register. He claimed there is not much time left for the general election to compile a new voters' register. He said Mensa and her outfit would be held responsible if the country turns into a turmoil after the 2020 general elections take place. Demonstrations took place across the country in three cities, Tamale, Kumasi and Accra, to sound their view against the compilation. In September 2023, the Electoral Commission headed by Mensa begun the registration for new registrants, which was also a chance to all people who lost or attained 18 years of age to be able to register for new Voter ID cards to help them participate legally in coming elections.

In February 2026, seven petitions seeking the removal of Jean Mensah as Chairperson of the Electoral Commission of Ghana and her two deputies were dismissed after the Chief Justice, Paul Baffoe-Bonnie, determined that they did not establish a prima facie case under Article 146 of the 1992 Constitution. The petitions, which had been referred by President John Dramani Mahama in late 2025, alleged misconduct and incompetence. Following the Chief Justice's determination, the process ended at the preliminary stage and Mensah remained in office.

Preceded by Charlotte Osei	Chair of the Electoral Commission of Ghana; 2018 – present	Incumbent
