= Association of African Election Authorities =

The Association of African Election Authorities (AAEA) is a Regional Network of Election Management Bodies. The organization is dedicated to the professionalization of election administration through information exchange and regional networking. The Association was conceived at the Colloquium of African Election Authorities held in Victoria Falls, Zimbabwe in November 1994 and since then has developed into an Association with sixteen full members and six associate members.

== Structure ==
The AAEA secretariat is based in Accra, Ghana, led by Kwadwo Afari-Gyan, Chairman of the Electoral Commission of Ghana. Member countries include: Benin, Burkina Faso, Central African Republic, Gabon, Gambia, Ghana, Guinea, Kenya, Lesotho, Liberia, Mali, Nigeria, Senegal, Togo, Uganda, and Zimbabwe.

== Partners ==
The International Foundation for Electoral Systems (IFES) lent significant support to the development of the AAEA.

== Activities ==
The AAEA has sent election observation teams to Nigeria cooperation with IFES

The AAEA and International IDEA co-sponsored an Electoral Administration Training for Facilitators using the BRIDGE Project Curriculum in Accra in 2005.
