= Yaw Darko Asare =

Ghanaian judge

Justice Yaw Darko Asare

Justice of the Supreme Court of Ghana
- Incumbent
- Assumed office 3 January 2024
- Nominated by: Nana Akufo-Addo

Justice of the Court of Appeal
- In office 17 December 2019 – 3 January 2024
- Nominated by: Nana Akufo-Addo

Personal details
- Born: August 22, 1963 (age 62) Ghana
- Education: Okuapeman Senior High School; Aggrey Memorial A.M.E. Zion Senior High School
- Alma mater: University of Ghana; Ghana School of Law; International Maritime Law Institute; Tulane University; Galilee College
- Profession: Judge

Yaw Darko Asare is a Ghanaian jurist and an active member of the Supreme Court of Ghana.

== Early life and education ==
Asare was born on 22 August 1963, in Akropong-Akwapim. He received his Ordinary Level Certificate from Okuapeman Senior High School in 1980 and his Advanced Level Certificate from Aggrey Memorial A.M.E. Zion Senior High School in 1982. He then pursued a Bachelor of Arts in law from the University of Ghana, which he obtained in 1986. He furthered his studies at the Ghana School of Law, where he earned his Professional Certificate in Law in 1986 and was called to the bar in 1988.

In 1995, Asare obtained a post-graduate degree in International Maritime Law from the International Maritime Law Institute in Malta. Additionally, in 1997, he completed a Certificate of Training in Legislative Drafting from Tulane University in the US, and in 1998, he received a Certificate of Training on Port Management, Operations, and Administration from Galilee College, Israel.

== Career ==
From 1989 to 1990, Asare served as a Teaching and Research Assistant at the University of Ghana, Faculty of Law, during his National Service. He then continued his National Service at the Ghana Ports and Harbours Authority from 1990 to 1991 and held the position of Senior Legal Officer at the Authority from 1993 to 2002.

Afterwards, he established the Beulah Chambers in 2002, where he served as the head until 2019. He then took up the position as a Justice on the Court of Appeal on 17 December 2019. He is also a Guest Lecturer at the University of Ghana, School of Law.

Throughout his career, Asare has held various leadership positions, including being a member of committees tasked with training court registrars on appeal record preparation and monitoring in September 2023 and drafting practice directions on Adoption of Proceedings in Part Heard Trials in August 2023. He has also served as a resource person for the Judicial Training Institute for the 14th Maritime Law seminar for Judges of Superior Courts of Ghana. In September 2022, he acted as a trainer for the Centre for Maritime Law and Security (CEMLAWS) Africa, facilitating a seminar for the Judicial Service, Navy, and Ghana Bar Association. The seminar focused on topics such as Ship Arrest, Maritime Liens, Judicial Sale, and Determination of Priorities. Additionally, the Nominee held the position of vice president at the Tema branch of the Ghana Bar Association.

Asare has actively engaged in various workshops and conferences. Notable events include a Judicial Service-sponsored Seminar on Public Land Protection and a virtual Seminar on International Trade Law in June 2021. The nominee also participated in a Judicial Service-sponsored virtual seminar addressing international commercial arbitration in July 2021.

== Supreme Court appointment ==
=== Nomination ===
Based on the advice of the Judicial Council in consultation with the Council of State under Article 144(2) of the Constitution of Ghana in July 2023, the president of Ghana, Nana Akufo-Addo, nominated Asare together with two other judges (Anthony Henry Kwofie and Richard Adjei-Frimpong) for the Supreme Court of Ghana. These nominated judges were to replace former Chief Justice, Justice Kwasi Anin-Yeboah, Justice Nene Abayateye Ofoe Amegatcher, and Justice Jones Victor Mawulorm Dotse, who had all retired in 2023 after attaining the retirement age of 70 years. Through a letter dated 11 October 2023, these nominations were announced in parliament by the deputy speaker of parliament. The nominees were then referred to the appointments committee for consideration in November 2023.

=== Vetting and approval ===
Asare was subsequently vetted on 20 December 2023 by the appointments committee of Parliament. During his vetting, he was questioned on various issues concerning the judiciary in Ghana. He believed that the perception of corruption in the judiciary was more prevalent than actual corruption. During his vetting process, he attributed this perception to a lack of understanding among the public about legal procedures. Asare cited a personal experience where a foreign client pursued a case in Ghana despite his advice against it, leading to a Supreme Court dismissal. He expressed concern that people often attribute unfavourable outcomes to corruption rather than legal complexities.

Asare acknowledged the existence of individuals who attempt to influence judges by offering bribes, creating a perception of corruption. However, he defended the integrity of the judges he has encountered during his four years on the bench, stating that the majority are highly reputable. While acknowledging the possibility of a few corrupt individuals, he emphasised the judiciary's commitment to addressing such issues. He, together with the two other nominees, were unanimously approved by Parliament on 23 December 2023. Members of both the Minority and Majority sides expressed their unanimous consent. Speaker of Parliament Alban Bagbin commended the President for the nominations and praised the judges for their impressive qualifications and experience. Bagbin expressed confidence in their ability to serve Ghana with distinction and uphold the integrity of the Supreme Court.

=== Swearing-in ===
He was sworn into office by President Akufo-Addo on 3 January 2024. Akufo-Addo, in his congratulatory message, tasked him and his colleagues with the responsibility of upholding the country's 1992 constitution. He emphasised that they had successfully met the rigorous criteria outlined in Article 128, Clause 4 of the Constitution, demonstrating independence of spirit, high moral character, proven integrity, and impartiality of mind necessary for the position.

== Personal life ==
Outside of his professional life, Asare enjoys watching football, listening to gospel music, reading, and engaging in physical workouts.
