= Georgina Opoku Amankwah =

Ghanaian politician

Deputy Chairperson of the Electoral Commission of Ghana
- In office 2015–2018
- President: John Dramani Mahama
- Preceded by: Amadu Sulley

Personal details
- Born: 2 February 1965 (age 61)
- Domestic partner: Raphael Frimpong Agyei
- Children: Adwoa Brayie, Yaa Ofosuaah
- Education: T.I.Ahmadiyya Senior High School

Georgina Opoku Amankwah (born 2 February 1965) was the deputy chairperson of the Electoral Commission of Ghana. Before her appointment in 2015, she was the first Chairperson of Trades Union Congress (TUC) Ghana. On June 28, 2018, she was removed from office on the directions of the president of Ghana, Nana Akufo-Addo.

== Education ==
Amankwaah had her ‘O’ level at T.I. Ahmadiyya Senior High School in Kumasi and went on for her ‘A’ level at Osei Kyeretwie Senior High School in Ashanti Region. She went to Kwame Nkrumah University of Science and Technology where she had a diploma in Estate Management and continued to get a degree in Social Sciences at the same university.

Amankwaah proceeded to University of Ghana where she studied for a Bachelor of Law (LLB) degree and continued to the Ghana School of Law.

== Controversies and allegations ==
Amankwaah was removed from office when a committee set up by the Chief Justice, Sophia Akuffo, to investigate corruption allegations levelled her, recommended her removal due to misconduct and incompetence. On June 28, 2018, the president of Ghana, Nana Akuffo-Addo in accordance with the recommendation and provisions of the Ghanaian constitution directed for her removal.
