= Imli =

Imli may refer to:

- Tamarind, the tree and its fruit, imli in Indic languages
- International Maritime Law Institute, a school in Malta

== See also ==
- Imlie, a 2020 Indian Hindi-language television series
