= Otiko Afisa Djaba =

Ghanaian politician (born 1962)

Hon. Otiko Afisa Djaba
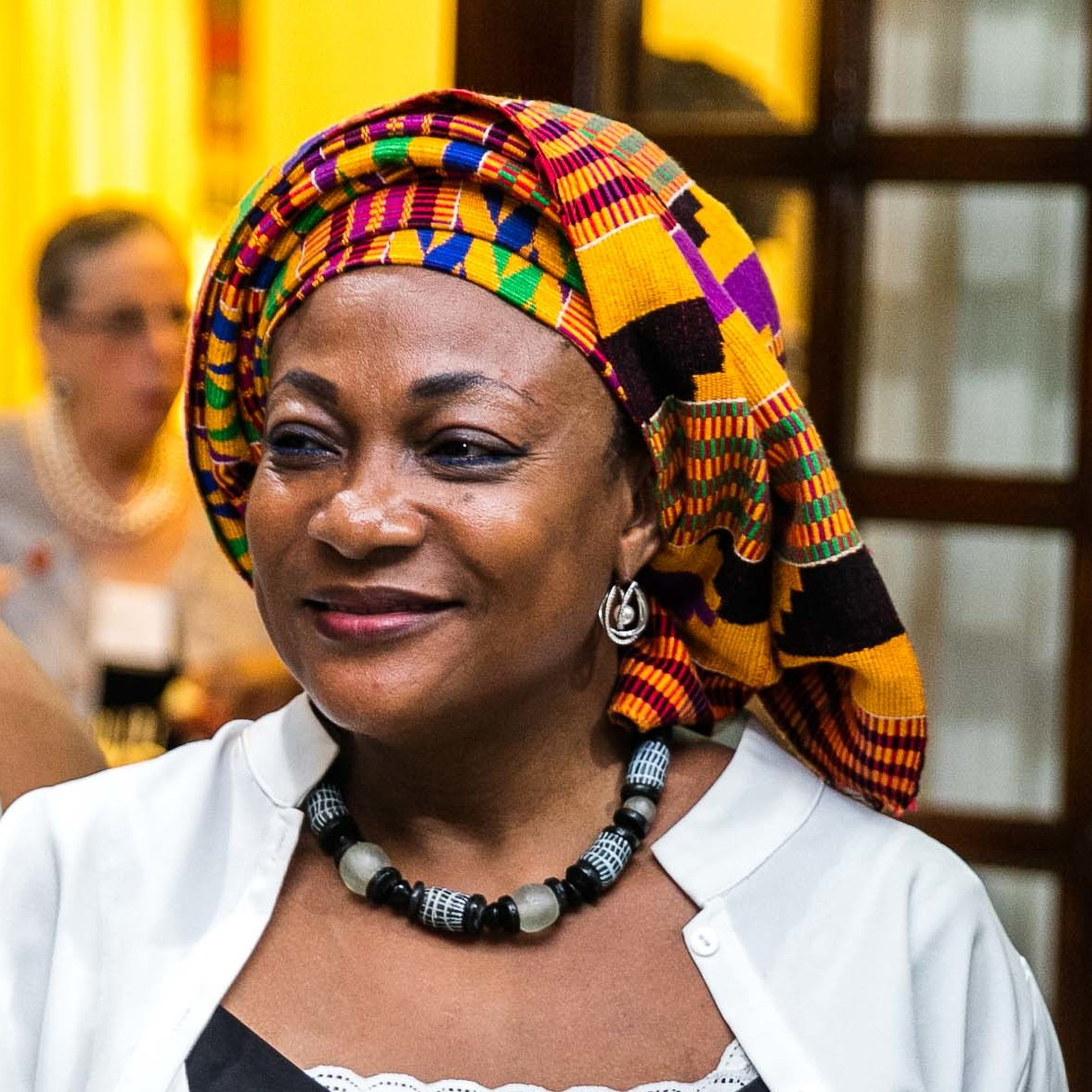

Minister for Gender, Children and Social Protection
- In office August 2017 – August 2018
- President: Nana Akufo-Addo

Personal details
- Born: January 21, 1962 (age 64)
- Party: New Patriotic Party
- Relations: Joyce Bawah Mogtari (sister)

Otiko Afisa Djaba (born 21 January 1962) is a Ghanaian politician. Her previous engagement was the National Women's Organizer for the New Patriotic Party. She was also the former minister for Gender, Children and Social Protection.

== Early life and education ==
Djaba was born on 21 January 1962 to Henry Kojo Djaba and Rosalind Sheita Bawa at Koforidua in the Eastern Region of Ghana. She is the second of twenty-one siblings.

Djaba attended Tamale Secondary School (now Tamale Senior High School). She holds a diploma in communications and marketing from an institution in the United Kingdom. She has also had training as a computer systems analyst from a college in the United Kingdom.

== Political life ==
In 2008, Djaba contested the Bole Bamboi seat on the ticket of the NPP but lost to former president, John Dramani Mahama and later became Women's Organizer of the New Patriotic Party. She was appointed Minister for Gender, Children and Social Protection in 2017. In August 2018, she was appointed Ghana's ambassador to Italy but declined the offer.

Otiko Djaba was named the 2018 Best African Gender Minister by a Los Angeles film maker, Ms Zuriel Elisie Oduwole, who doubles as an advocate for education.

=== Opposition to ministerial position ===
Minority legislators walked out of a voting process to approve Djaba's appointment as Gender, Children and Social Protection minister collectively stating that "they believe her temperament and attitude does not give [them] assurance that she will be able to better manage the affairs of Ghanaian children and women". Prior to the 2016 general election in Ghana, Djaba had called on her Gonja tribes-people to vote John Mahama out because he has not being faithful to them, describing him at a political rally in 2016 as “very wicked, incompetent and desperate". She maintained that her comments were non-provocative and that she did "not owe anybody an apology", continuing to insist on her use of the same language to describe the former president. Two other concerns were also raised by the opposition legislators: the first was about her violation of The Ghana National Service Scheme Act 426 section 7 which mandates all university graduates do a compulsory one year national service to the country before taking public office. The second was around her reiterating the assertion that Charlotte Osei offered sexual favors to Mahama in exchange for her position as Electoral Commission of Ghana chairperson.

Despite opposition members walking out of the secret ballot, Djaba obtained 152 favorable votes in excess of the 50% required to secure her the position.

Madam Otiko Afisa Djaba now hosts a Television Programme on TV3 dubbed "Let's Talk Ability".

== Personal life ==
Otiko is the elder sister of former Deputy Transport Minister Joyce Bawah Mogtari.
