= List of corruption allegations against parliamentarians in Ghana =

This article provides a list of formal corruption allegations against Ghanaian parliamentarians, sorted from most recent date to least recent.

== Cases ==
- Abuga Pele. Member of parliament for the Chiana-Paga constituency, Abuga pele was convicted in February 2018 and charged with a six-year jail term for willfully causing a loss of GH¢4.1 million to the state of Ghana.
- Mohammed Mubarak Muntaka. In June 2009, Mubarak Muntaka resigned from his position as Minister for Youth and Sports on the orders of President Mills following investigations into dozens of allegations levelled against him, including financial malpractice and abuse of power. Ghana's Commission on Human Rights and Administrative Justice asked Mubarak Muntaka to refund misappropriated funds.
- Mahama Ayariga. A pressure group petitioned the Commission on Human Rights and Administrative Justice in September 2009 to investigate Mahama Ayariga for acquiring 5 subsidized tractors from the ministry of Agriculture that were meant to support underprivileged farmers in rural communities. Appointments Committee of Parliament initially suspended his approval of becoming a minister pending investigations, that cleared him afterwards. Mahama Ayariga claimed that his application to acquire the tractors "was approved" and he was unaware that there was an "affordable arrangements" scheme associated with purchasing the tractors. The investigation was reopened in July 2017 when a different political party formed a new government.

== See also ==
- Nana Akufo-Addo administration controversies
- Corruption in Ghana
