= Anyimon =

- Town
- Location within Ghana
- Coordinates: 7°25′45.12″N 2°39′41.8″W
- Country: Ghana
- Region: Brong-Ahafo Region
- District: Berekum Municipal District
- Time zone: UTC

Anyimon is a town located in the mid-western part of Ghana. It is in the Berekum Municipal District of the Brong-Ahafo Region of Ghana.

== Notable people ==
- Kwadwo Afari-Gyan, the former Chairman of the Electoral Commission of Ghana.
