= Gertrude Zakaria =

Ghanaian politician

Gertrude Zakaria-Ali was a Ghanaian Deputy Minister of Local Government in 1982 under the PNDC led by Jerry John Rawlings. She is also known to be one of the founders of the 31st December Women's Movement currently led by Nana Konadu Agyeman Rawlings. She was the Director of Research at the National Commission for Civic Education.
