= Kwadwo Afari-Gyan =

Ghanaian former electoral commissioner

Chairman of the Electoral Commission of Ghana
- In office 1993–2015
- Preceded by: Justice Josiah Ofori Boateng
- Succeeded by: Charlotte Ama Osei

Personal details
- Born: 18 June 1945 (age 81) Anyimon, Ghana
- Children: 4
- Education: University of Ghana; University of California, Santa Barbara
- Occupation: Academic, Political scientist

Kwadwo Afari-Gyan CSG (born 18 June 1945) is a Ghanaian academic, political scientist and election administrator. He was Chairman of the Electoral Commission of Ghana from 1993 to 2015.

== Early life and education ==
Afari-Gyan was born on 18 June 1945 at Anyimon in the Brong Ahafo Region of Ghana. He attended Achimota School and Adisadel College for his A Level and also graduated from the University of Ghana in 1967 with a BA degree in Philosophy. He attained a MA degree in African politics in 1969 from the same university. He also studied in the United States where he was awarded a Ph. D. in political science from the University of California, Santa Barbara in 1974.

== Career ==
Afari-Gyan worked as a lecturer and a professor of Political Science at the University of Ghana. He has also lectured in the United States and Nigeria. He was a member of the Committee of Experts that drafted the Fourth Republican Constitution for Ghana.

In 1992, he was appointed deputy chairman of the Interim National Electoral Commission by the Provisional National Defence Council, which was ruling as a military junta, with the hope of returning the country to civilian rule. His job was to ensure that the November 1992 presidential election and the December 1992 parliamentary elections were free and fair. Jerry John Rawlings, the chairman of the PNDC, who was also Head of State, stood and won the elections.

With the coming into force of the Fourth Republican Constitution, a new Electoral Commission was set up and Afari-Gyan became its first substantive chairman. He has successfully supervised all the elections held under this constitution so far. He has successfully chaired the conduct of presidential and parliamentary elections in 1992, 1996, 2000, 2004 and 2008. In the last of these, unofficial institutions attempted to declare the results of these elections, with Afari-Gyan stating that these results could not be trusted.

The 2004 general elections were disputed in court by the opposition National Democratic Congress. But the case was lost on technicalities. Again, the 2012 presidential election between President John Dramani Mahama and Nana Akufo-Addo ended up in an 8-month election petition trial at the Supreme Court. The opposition leader lost the case in a 5:4 split decision, which held that the President was validly elected. But, the trial, which was live on television, exposed some fundamental weaknesses in Ghana's electoral process, triggering calls and moves towards comprehensive electoral reforms before the 2016 general elections. The ruling has been heavily criticised by jurists.

This is what one of the Supreme Court Justices, Justice Jones Dotse, had to say about Dr Afari Gyan: "My observation is that, Dr. Afari Gyan appeared to have concentrated his oversight responsibility at the top notch of the election administration, thereby abdicating his supervisory role at the grassroots or bottom, where most of the activities critical to the conduct of elections are performed. In this instance, he even appeared not to be conversant with some of the basic procedural steps and rules that are performed by his so-called temporary staff. So far as I am concerned, Dr. Afari Gyan has cut a very poor figure of himself, and the much acclaimed competent election administrator both nationally and internationally has evaporated into thin air once his portfolio has come under the close scrutiny of the Courts."

In 1998, he became the Executive Secretary of the Association of African Election Authorities. He was also a member of a committee of experts who advised Nigeria on elections.

He retired as Chairman of the Electoral Commission in June 2015.

== Honours ==
He was awarded the Order of the Star of Ghana, the highest national award by President John Mahama, on 1 July 2015.

== Other activities ==
He has also worked in other African countries and has written several books. He was the "star witness" for the Electoral Commission of Ghana in an electoral petition filed by the New Patriotic Party after the 2012 general election.

== Publications ==
- The Political Ideas of Kwame Nkrumah. University of California, Santa Barbara. 1974. p. 462.
- Nkrumah's Ideology. 1985.
- Public Tribunals and Justice in Ghana. Asempa Publishers. 1988. p. 14.
- Understanding Politics. Asempa Publishers. 1991. p. 109.
- The Making of the Fourth Republican Constitution of Ghana. Accra: Goldtype Publishers & Friedrich Ebert Foundation, Ghana Office. 1995. p. 139. ISBN 978-9988-572-02-0.
- The Ghanaian constitution: An introduction. Friedrich Ebert Foundation. 1999. p. 108. ISBN 978-9988-572-56-3.
- Sarpong, Peter; et al. (1992). Afari-Gyan, Kwadwo; Arhin, Kwame (eds.). The City of Kumasi Handbook: Past, Present and Future-Cambridge Faxbooks. OCLC 29495434.

| Preceded by Josiah Ofori Boateng | Chairman of the Electoral Commission of Ghana; 1993 – 2015 | Succeeded by Charlotte Osei |
