= Simon Ofori Ametepey =

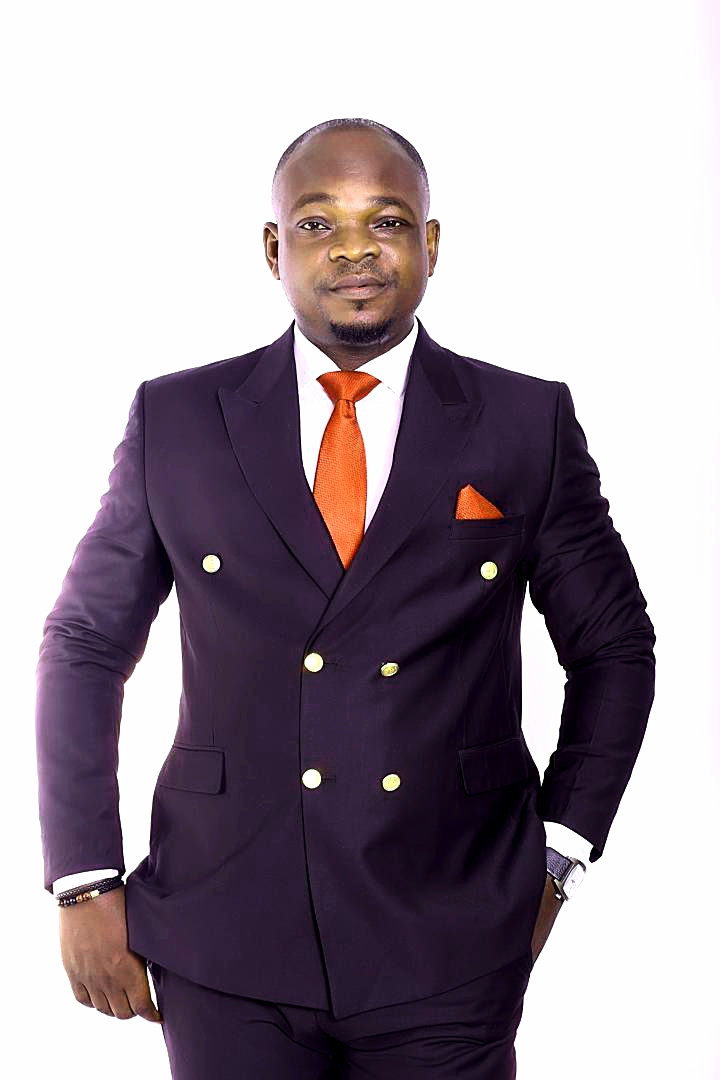

Personal details
- Education: University of Johannesburg, South Africa
- Occupation: Engineer, lecturer

Simon Ofori Ametepey born on (23 August 1982) is a Ghanaian engineer who was appointed as a commissioner of the National Commission for Civic Education (NCCE). He is a member of the Project Management Institute (PMI) and the Institution of Engineering and Technology (IET).

== Early life and education ==
Simon Ofori Ametepey holds a Ph.D. in civil engineering from the University of Johannesburg, South Africa. He also obtained degrees in Building Technology, Construction Technology, Environmental Management, and is currently pursuing an LLM in Energy Law at the University of Ghana. He has over 100 research publications

== Career and public service ==
Ametepey is a Senior Lecturer in Sustainable Infrastructure Development at Koforidua Technical University (KTU), Ghana, and serves as the Director of the Centre for Sustainable Development (CenSuD). He has worked with the Ministry of Roads and Highways and has also been involved in donor-funded projects such as those by IFAD and the European Union (EU). Additionally, he served as a Consultant for a number of infrastructure and sustainable development projects, and notably, in 2023, he was appointed by the President of the Republic of Ghana as a Commissioner for the National Commission for Civic Education (NCCE).
