= Stella Saaka =

Ghanaian women's rights activist

- Occupations: Women's rights activist; Agricultural advocate
- Organization: Women in Agriculture Platforms (WAP)
- Known for: Women's land rights advocacy
- Awards: Ghana Woman of Courage Award (2019)

Stella Saaka is a Ghanaian women's rights activist based in the Talensi district of the Upper East region of Ghana. It is known that women in the Upper East region face difficulties in acquiring land. She is however known as the only woman to have successfully convinced the traditional and local authorities to part with 29 acres of land for 30 women farmers in the Talensi District. In 2019, she was honored by Stephanie Sullivan, the U.S. ambassador with a Ghana Woman of Courage Award. She is currently the regional organizing secretary for Women in Agriculture Platforms (WAP), a government project sponsored by the US Agency for International Development (USAID).

The U.S. Embassy’s Woman of Courage Award recognizes emerging women leaders in Ghana in the way that the International Women of Courage Award pays tribute to emerging women leaders worldwide, the only Department of State award to do so.

She and the 30 women used the 29 acres of land for farming and this has helped the women generate additional income in supporting their families. Her efforts have led to a decrease in female migration during the dry season because more women are now finding ways to contribute to the economy in the Talensi district. Again, Saaka through her political engagement successfully convinced the Talensi traditional leadership to include women in the district's development and decision-making process. Up to date, she and her WAP colleagues are representatives of their district at the Assembly's Medium Term Development Planning sessions.
