= Bimbagu =

Town in Bunkpurugu-Yunyoo District, Ghana

Bimbagu is a town in the Bunkpurugu-Yunyoo District of the Northern Region.

== Notable people ==
- Larry Bimi
