= 2019 Ghanaian constitutional referendum attempt =

A constitutional referendum was scheduled to be held in Ghana on 17 December 2019, alongside district level elections. The proposed amendments to the constitution would have allowed for the direct election of Metropolitan, Municipal and District Chief Executives (MMDCEs) and allow political parties to be involved in local elections.

== Background ==
The direct election of MMDCEs was a campaign promise of successful presidential candidate Nana Akufo-Addo in the 2016 general elections.

The proposed changes would involve amending article 243(1), which provides for the appointment of MMDCEs by the president, and article 55(3), which bans political party activity in district-level elections. As article 55 is an entrenched clause, the referendum requires a turnout of at least 40% and over 75% of those voting to vote in favour for the proposal to be passed.

On 1 December 2019, President Akufo-Addo cancelled the referendum.
