= Joyce Bawah Mogtari =

Ghanaian lawyer and politician

Hon. Joyce Bawah Mogtari
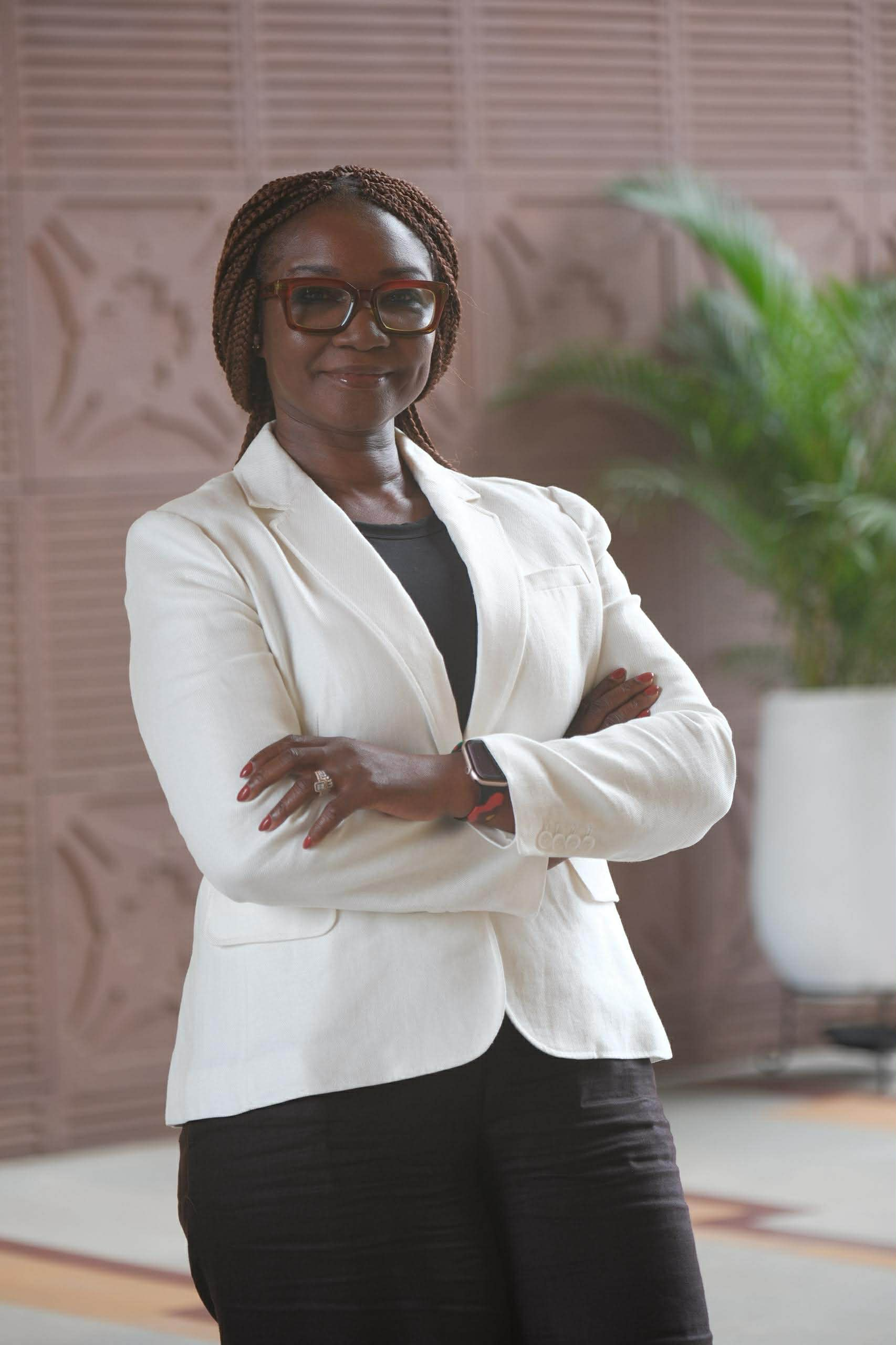
- Portrait of Joyce Bawah Mogtari

Special Aide to the President
- In office 2025–2028
- President: John Dramani Mahama
- Succeeded by: Daniel Nii Kwartei Titus Glover

Former Deputy Minister for Transport

Personal details
- Born: Joyce Bawah Mogtari
- Party: National Democratic Congress
- Relations: Otiko Afisa Djaba (sister)
- Children: 4
- Education: University of London; International Maritime Law Institute
- Occupation: Lawyer, Spokesperson

Joyce Bawah Mogtari is a Ghanaian lawyer and politician who served as a Deputy Minister of Transport in Ghana. She is currently the special aide to the current president of GhanaJohn Dramani Mahama. She is an experienced mediator and has done this on several occasions, both locally and internationally.

== Early life and education ==
Joyce Bawa Mogtari is a native of Ghana's Savanna Region. She attended Wesley Girls' Senior High School, St. Francis Girls’ Secondary School, and Tamale Secondary School. From her secondary school education, she proceeded to Holborn College, University of London, where she graduated with a Bachelor of Laws (LL.B.) degree in 1997. In the year 2000, she was called to the bar. She is a member of the bar in Ghana, England and Wales.

She also holds a master's degree in maritime law (L.L.M.) from the International Maritime Organization (IMO) and International Maritime Law Institute (IMLI) in Malta, where she was the recipient of the IMO Legal Committee Chairman's Award for Best Overall Performance in International Transport Law. She also holds a master's degree in conflict resolution and mediation from the Kofi Annan International Peacekeeping Training Centre- Ghana.

Joyce also holds a certificate from the Chartered Institute of Logistics (CILT) Ghana.

== Career ==
Joyce Mogtari was formally called to the bar in 2000 and started her career with the legal firm Sey & Co. Later, she became a consultant for KPMG and the Venture Capital Trust Fund. She also served as the Head of the Legal Department and Solicitor Secretary of the Ghana Shippers' Authority and as the head of the Ghana Shippers' Authority from 2007 to 2013. She served as a board member for both PSC Tema Shipyard Company Limited and the National Lotteries Authority (NLA). She also served as the Director of the Legal Service of the Ghana Shippers Authority. Joyce Mogtari also handles a Senior Managing Partner position at Praetorium Solicitors, a boutique law firm in Ghana.

== Politics ==
Joyce Mogtari is a member of the National Democratic Congress (NDC). She has served on campaign teams and committees within the party over the years, including serving as a member of the 30-member legal team of the party. She was the spokesperson for President John Mahama's presidential campaign in the 2016 General Elections. After the elections, Mahama appointed her as his special aide and official spokesperson.

=== Deputy Minister of Transport ===
In March 2013, Joyce Mogtari was appointed by John Mahama to serve as the Deputy Minister for Transport. She served in that capacity until January 2017. She served as the spokesperson for Mahama's 2016 Election campaign.

== Professional associations ==
Joyce Mogtari is a member of the Ghana Bar Association and the African Women Lawyers Association(AWLA). She is also a member of the Ghana State Alumni and the Women in International Shipping and Trade Association (WISTA). Again, Joyce Mogtari is a fellow of the USA-International Visitor Leadership Programme.

== Personal life ==
Joyce Mogtari is married to Hudu Mogtari, a former CEO of the Food and Drugs Authority (FDA) and currently the board chair of Ghana Standard Authority (GSA). They have four children. Joyce is the younger sister of former Minister for Gender, Children and Social Protection, Otiko Afisa Djaba.

== Philanthropic Works ==
1. Joyce Mogtari in January, 2024, donated cooking and provisional stuffs to two orphanages in Wa.
2. On behalf of the Rosa Foundation-Africa, Joyce Bawah Mogtari gave 622 first-year Tamale Girls Senior High School pupils a five-month supply of sanitary pads in 2023.
3. In 2022, Madam Joyce Mogtari also made a donation of 120 metallic mono desks worth Gh¢12,000.00 to the Ganaa Memorial Junior High School (JHS) at Jirapa in the Upper West Region.
4. In 2024, Joyce Bawah Mogtari together with her foundation (Rosa Foundation-Africa) donated some food items and toiletries to the Osu Children’s Home during her birthday celebration.
5. In 2026, she donated an amount of 10,000 cedis to Radio Tamale.

== Awards, Achievements And Recognition ==
1. Joyce Mogtari was honored at the 6th Edition of the Northern Excellence Awards (NExA) which took place on the 9th of March, 2024, as the NExA2024 'Most Outstanding Northern Woman of the Year' for her style of leadership which simplifies the values of integrity, compassion, and resilience as well as inspiring others to make a positive impact in their communities.
2. Madam Joyce Mogtari was also honored as a trailblazer for young women in politics in 2023.
3. She was also the recipient of the IMO Legal Committee Chairman's Award for Best Overall Performance in International Transport Law from International Maritime Law Institute (IMLI) in Malta.
4. Joyce Mogtari played a pivotal role towards the expansion and automation of services of the Tema port's $1.5 billion infrastructure project to upgrade it to a competitive global shipping hub.
