= International Maritime Law Institute =

Logo of the International Maritime Law Institute

The IMO International Maritime Law Institute (IMLI) was established in 1988 under the auspices of the International Maritime Organization, a specialized agency of the United Nations. Its mission is to train specialists in maritime law. The Institute is currently headquartered in Malta, on the campus of the University of Malta.

== History ==
IMLI was established in 1988 under an Agreement concluded between IMO and the Government of Malta. It commenced its first academic year in October 1989. Its campus is at the University of Malta.

== Programmes ==
The Institute offers academic course designed to cover the whole spectrum of International Maritime Law, including International Law, Law of the Sea, Shipping Law, International Maritime Security Law, Marine Environmental Law, and Legislation Drafting. Training at the Institute concentrates on three areas:

1. The development of expertise to advise on and develop national maritime legislation;
2. The development of legislative drafting skills to ensure that States have the necessary expertise to incorporate international rules into domestic legislation; and
3. The preparation of lawyers to participate in, and contribute to, the deliberations of the international maritime fora.
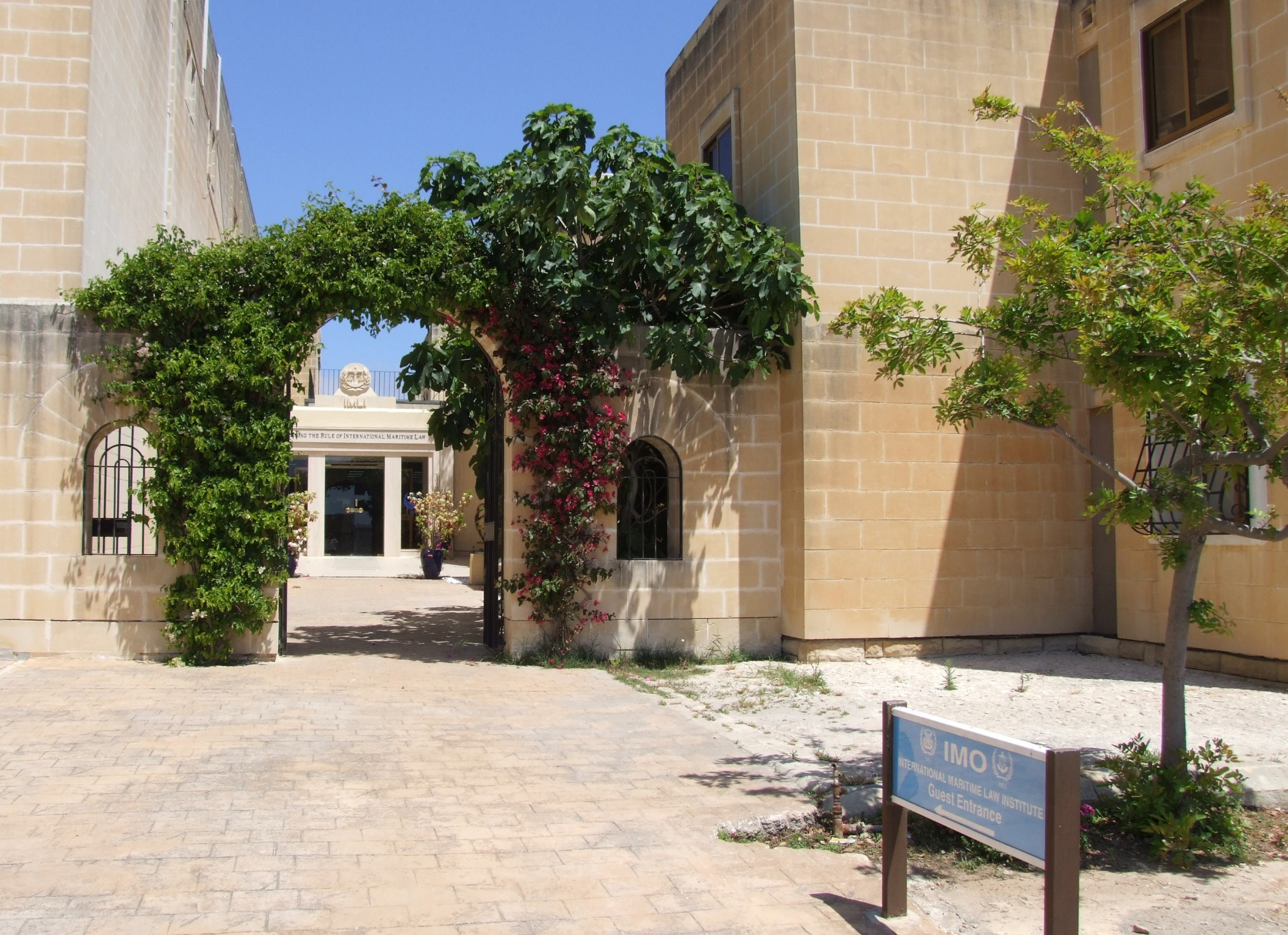
  IMLI Main Gate

The duration of the course is one academic year and successful students are awarded a master's degree (LLM) in International Maritime Law.

The Institute offers other Programmes of Study, ranging from the Doctor of Philosophy in International Maritime Law to an Advanced Diploma for non-lawyers who wish to understand the major features of international maritime law.

IMLI offers several programmes which include LL.M., M.Hum. M.Phil. Research Degree and Advanced Diploma, as well as shorter courses.

== Student body ==
In order to qualify, students – who primarily should come from developing States – are required to have a first law degree. At IMLI, 50% of the places on the course each year are reserved for women candidates. Candidates are generally nominated and supported by their Governments, but seats are also allocated to independent candidates.

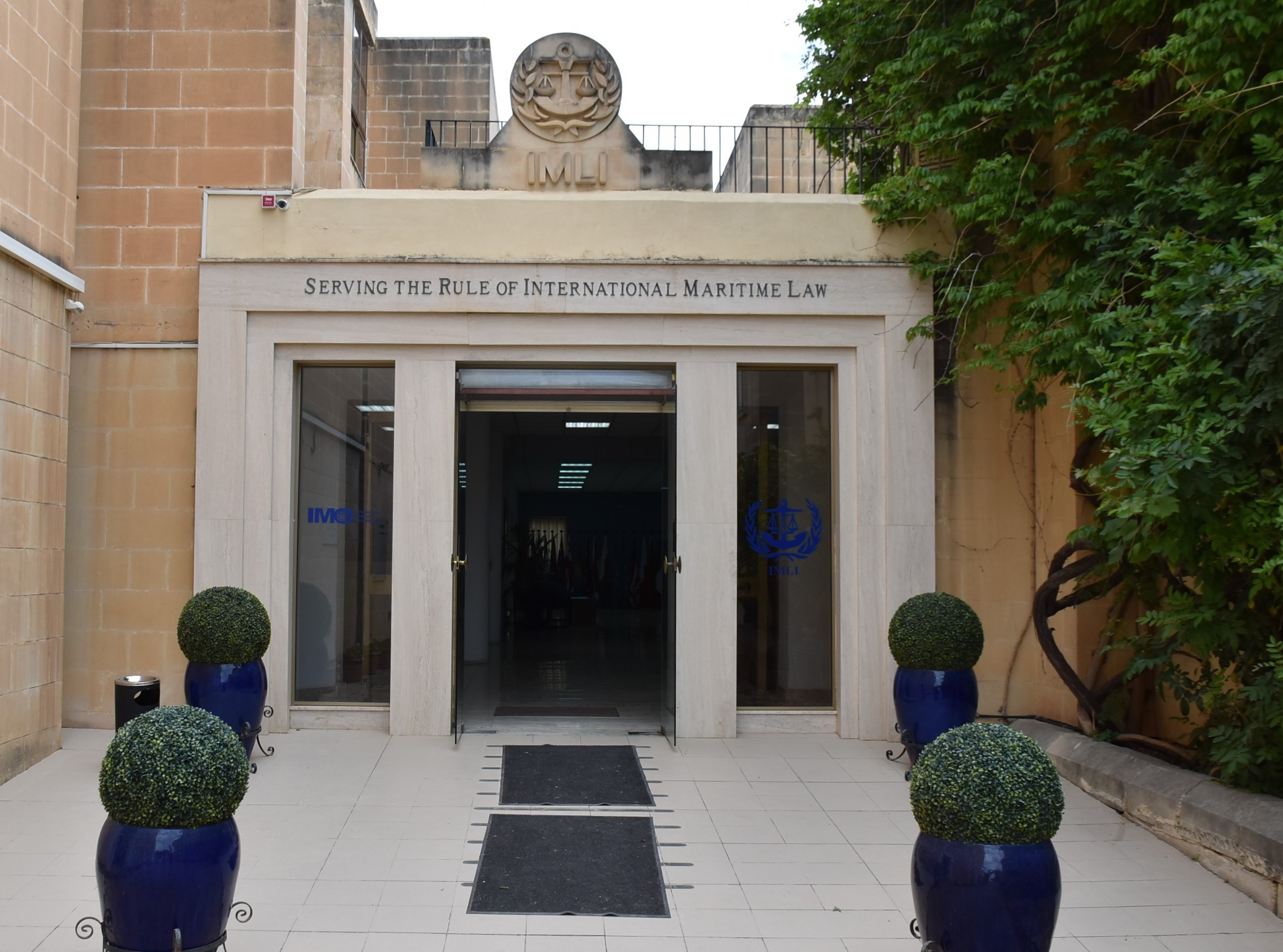
IMLI Entrance

== Officials ==
- Chairman of the Governing Board: Kitack Lim
- Director: Norman A. Martinez Gutierrez (2022–present)

== Notable alumni ==
- Richard Adjei-Frimpong, active Justice of the Supreme Court of Ghana
- Yaw Darko Asare, active Justice of the Supreme Court of Ghana
- Fatou Bensouda, Gambian lawyer and Chief Prosecutor of the International Criminal Court
- Joyce Bawah Mogtari, Ghanaian lawyer and politician, Former Deputy Minister of Transport in Ghana
- Josephine Nkrumah, Ghanaian lawyer, chairperson of the National Commission for Civic Education in Ghana.
- Sandra Opoku, Ghanaian lawyer, Director of the Tema Port.
- Gerald Zackios, Marshallese politician and diplomat, Former Minister of Foreign Affairs in Marshall Islands, Ambassador of the Republic of the Marshall Islands to the United States

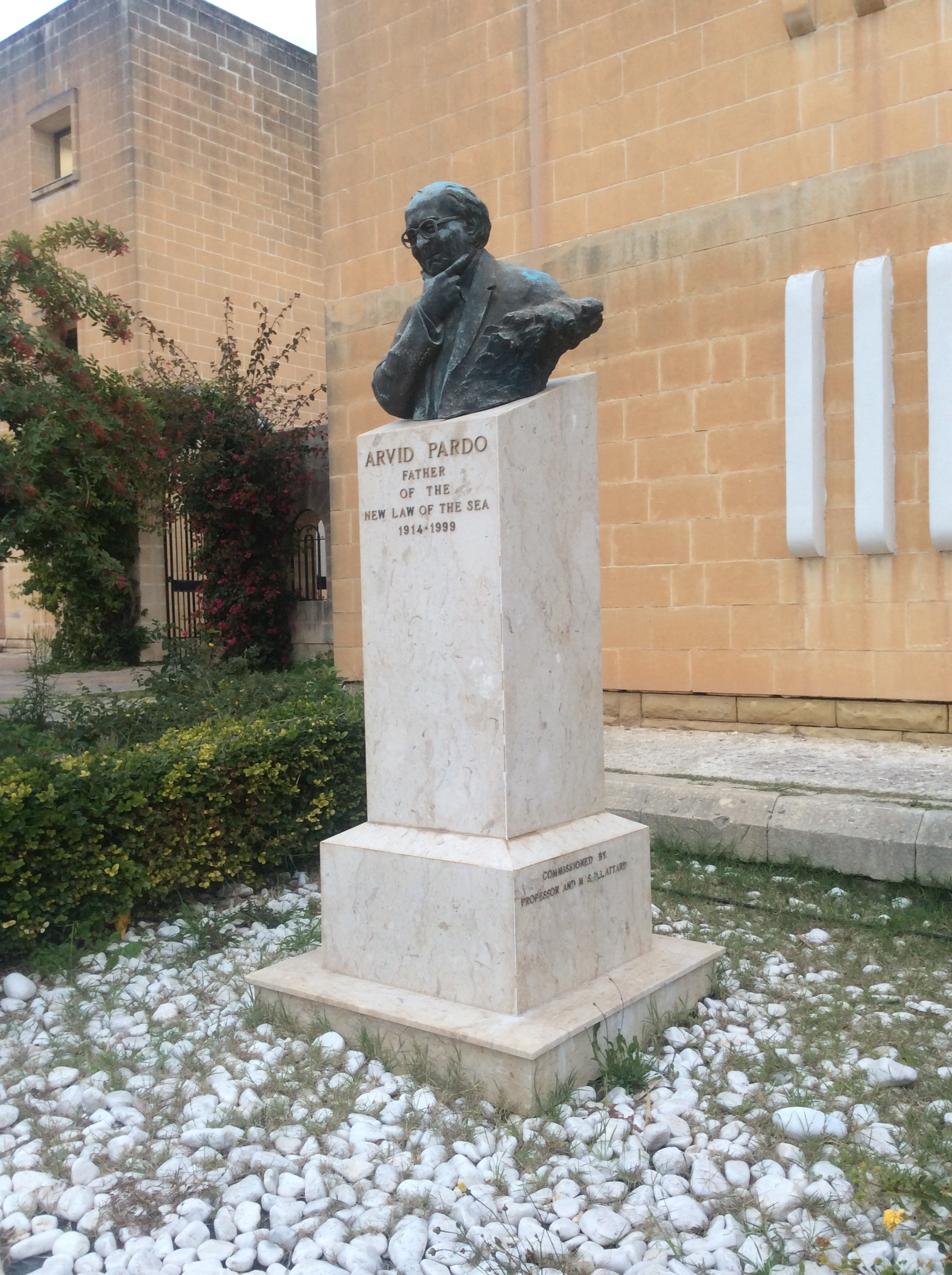
The statue of Arvid Pardo in front of the institute’s building in 2016

== See also ==
- International Maritime Organization
