= Richard Adjei-Frimpong =

Ghanaian judge

Justice Richard Adjei-Frimpong

Justice of the Supreme Court of Ghana
- Incumbent
- Assumed office 3 January 2024
- Nominated by: Nana Akufo-Addo

Justice of the Court of Appeal
- In office 2020 – 3 January 2024
- Nominated by: Nana Akufo-Addo

Justice of the High Court
- In office 2010–2020
- Nominated by: John Atta-Mills

Personal details
- Born: February 27, 1971 (age 55) Ghana
- Education: Acherensua Senior High School
- Alma mater: University of Ghana; Ghana School of Law; International Maritime Law Institute
- Profession: Judge

Richard Adjei-Frimpong is a Ghanaian judge and an active justice of the Supreme Court of Ghana.

== Early life and education ==
Adjei-Frimpong was born in Acherensua, Ahafo Region, on 27 February 1971. He attended Acherensua Methodist L/A Primary School from 1976 to 1984 for his primary and middle school education. His ordinary-level education and advanced-level education were completed at Acherensua Secondary School (now Acherensua Senior High School) from 1984 to 1989 and from 1989 to 1991, respectively. He then pursued a Bachelor of Laws (LL.B.) degree at the University of Ghana from 1992 to 1996. After obtaining his LL.B., he attended the Ghana School of Law for his professional legal education and was called to the bar in 1998. In 2014, he received a Master of Laws degree in International Maritime Law from the International Maritime Law Institute (IMLI) in Malta. His dissertation was entitled Safeguarding the Rights of the Seafarer in Case of Criminalization: The Role of the Coastal State’s Judiciary.

== Career ==
During his mandatory national service, the nominee served as an administrative staff and legal officer in the non-Formal Education Division from 1991 to 1992 and 1998 to 1999, respectively. He then worked in private legal practice at Otu-Essel & Associates in Sunyani from 1998 to 2003. In 2003, he began his career in the Judicial Service of Ghana as a District Magistrate in Bekwai. He served as a judge of the circuit courts in Bekwai and Kumasi from 2004 to 2008 and 2008 to 2010, respectively. From 2010 to 2020, he worked as a Justice of High Courts in Accra, Tema, and Sekondi. Since 2020, he has been serving as a Justice of the Court of Appeal and a resource person at the Judicial Training Institute. He is also a guest lecturer at the University of Ghana School of Law since February 2023, teaching Admiralty Law.

In terms of leadership positions, Adjei-Frimpong was the National Vice President of the Brong Ahafo Students Union (BASU) from 1993 to 1994 and the Junior Common Room (JCR) President of the Legon Hall at the University of Ghana from 1994 to 1995. He chaired the Constitutional Review Committee in 2013 and served as chairman on the Board of Trustees of the JUSAG Pension Trust. Additionally, he has been a member of various committees and units within the judicial service, including the E-Justice Committee, the Performance Assessment Committee, the Claims Investigative Committee, and the Complaints Unit. He was also a member of the Board of Governors of Acherensua Senior High School from 2014 to 2016 and currently serves on the Board of Directors of Asutifi Rural Bank, where he has been since 2018. He is currently the Chairman of the Medical Refund Committee in the Judicial Service.

Adjei-Frimpong was a member of the Ghana Bar Association from 1998 to 2003 and is currently a member of the Association of Magistrates and Judges of Ghana (AMG). He has attended various conferences and workshops, including the Commonwealth Magistrates' and Judges' Association Triennial Conference in Turks and Caicos Island in 2008 and a workshop on the Enforcement of Intellectual Property Rights organised by WIPO-USPTO in the US in 2011. He has also attended seminars and workshops on corruption, money laundering, terrorism financing, and the role of the court and judges in arbitration.

== Supreme Court appointment ==
=== Nomination ===
The President of Ghana, Nana Akufo-Addo, nominated Adjei-Frimpong together with two other judges (Henry Anthony Kwofie and Yaw Darko Asare), who were then Court of Appeal judges, for consideration and approval by Parliament to fill vacancies in the Supreme Court. The retired judges to be replaced are former Chief Justice Kwasi Anin-Yeboah, Justice Nene Abayateye Ofoe Amegatcher, and Justice Jones Victor Mawulorm Dotse. The President, following advice from the Judicial Council in consultation with the Council of State and in accordance with constitutional obligations under Article 144(2), submitted the nominees' names and CVs to Parliament for the necessary vetting and approval, aiming to complete the Supreme Court's complement of judges. The announcement was made by the First Deputy Speaker, Joseph Osei-Owusu on Friday, 10 November 2023.

=== Vetting and approval ===
Adjei-Frimpong was subsequently vetted on 20 December 2023 by the Appointments Committee of Parliament, which was headed by the First Deputy Speaker of Parliament, Joseph Osei-Owusu. In his vetting, Adjei-Frimpong answered questions on topics such as limiting the number of Supreme Court judges, court process delays, custodial sentencing, his tenure duration at the Supreme Court, work-life balance, perceived judicial corruption, bar-bench dynamics, judgement debt, the e-justice system, his Asutifi Rural Bank board membership, his Human Sexual Rights and Ghanaian Family Values Bill 2021 stance, the necessity of Supreme Court research assistants, and his views on unreasoned rulings.

Concerning the discourse of limiting the number of Supreme Court judges, he stated that, while he acknowledged the significant expenses associated with compensating Supreme Court judges, he believed there should be some flexibility in addressing the issue. He further added that, as of July 2023, there were 595 pending cases in the Supreme Court, highlighting the human resource challenges the court faces. Despite the court's diligent efforts to resolve cases, the increasing caseload was a driving factor behind the situation.

On the issue of the Human Sexual Rights and Ghanaian Family Values Bill of 2021, a bill that aims to regulate human sexual rights and family values, specifically targeting LGBTQ+ activities, he urged Parliament to carefully consider all input on the "Promotion of Proper Human Sexual Rights and Ghanaian Family Values Bill, 2022." He stressed the importance of crafting a law that benefits all Ghanaians. Justice Adjei-Frimpong highlighted his duty as a judge to apply the law after Parliament's decisions. During his vetting by the Appointment Committee, he expressed the need for the House to consider stakeholder comments and issues raised in the debate. In response to a question about potential discrimination against minority sexual groups, he reiterated his commitment to following the law.

He was unanimously approved by Parliament on 23 December 2023. The unanimous approval followed the adoption of the 33rd report of the Appointments Committee, which had vetted him and his two other colleague Justices of the Court of Appeal on 20 December 2023. Joseph Osei-Owusu, the chairman of the committee and First Deputy Speaker, presented the report, highlighting his demonstrated knowledge and expertise in the law. The First Deputy Speaker then moved a motion for the House to adopt the committee's recommendation to approve the nominees by consensus.

=== Swearing-in ===
Adjei-Frimpong was sworn into office by President Akufo-Addo on 3 January 2024. The ceremony, in accordance with Article 144 (2) of the 1992 Constitution, marked the appointment of Adjei-Frimpong and his two other colleagues to the Supreme Court. The event, held at the Jubilee House in Accra, included the taking of Allegiance, Judicial, and Secrecy oaths, with the President presenting him with a Warrant of Appointment.

President Akufo-Addo emphasised the Supreme Court's role as the policy court, making crucial decisions on the legal aspects of the country's socio-economic development. He urged the newly appointed justices to ensure that the judiciary earns the people's respect through the quality of justice delivery and the conduct of its judges. The President highlighted the importance of applying the laws without bias, as outlined in the Judicial Oath, irrespective of political, religious, or ethnic affiliations.

Dignitaries in attendance at the ceremony were the Chief Justice, Justice Gertrude Torkornoo, members of the Judicial Council, the President of the ECOWAS Court of Justice, the Chief of Staff, Akosua Frema Osei-Opare, and Attorney General and Minister of Justice, Godfred Yeboah Dame.

== Awards ==
Among his accolades, the Adjei-Frimpong received the S.Y. Bimpong-Buta Award for the Best Student in Interpretation of Deeds and Statutes in 1998 and an Award for Patriotic Service to the Country and Humanity in 2019.

== Personal life ==
In his free time, he enjoys reading, researching, and playing lawn tennis.
