= Kathleen Addy =

Ghanaian human rights activist

- Known for: Activism
- Title: Deputy Chairman, Finance and Administration, NCCE

Kathleen Addy is a Ghanaian activist with a special interest in governance and human rights. She is the Deputy Commissioner of the National Commission for Civic Education (NCCE), a position she has held since March 2017. She has worked with governmental and non governmental organisations in Ghana to promote the use of communications strategies and interventions in enhancing social impact.

== Education ==
Addy graduated with a bachelor's degree in Psychology from the University of Ghana. She obtained a master's degree in Communications from the University of Ghana School of Communications Studies.

== Career ==
In 2017, Addy was appointed Deputy Chairperson in Charge of Finance and Administration at the National Commission For Civic Education by President Nana Akufo-Addo. Addy has worked with civil society organisations in Ghana including the Center for Democratic Development (CDD) where she was the Afrobarometer Communications Manager with oversight of seven African countries. Addy also worked with the Center for Policy Analysis (CEPA) Ghana as a Research and Communications Officer, with a focus on women's economic empowerment and economic partnership agreements.

Addy has worked on projects in gender and economic development, gender-based and domestic violence, and economic development through international trade.
