= Larry Bimi =

Ghanaian lawyer and public official

Farhan Larry Bimi

Former Chairman of the National Commission for Civic Education
- In office 2009–2011
- Succeeded by: Charlotte Osei

Personal details
- Died: 23 July 2011 (age 66) Korle-Bu Teaching Hospital, Accra, Ghana
- Children: 1
- Profession: Lawyer

Larry Bimi (died 23 July 2011) was a Ghanaian lawyer and public official.

== History ==
He was born in Bimbagu in the Bunkpurugu-Yunyoo District of the Northern Region.

== Public life ==
He practiced as a lawyer in Ghana till he was called to chair the National Commission for Civic Education in 2009. As chairman of the commission he supervised the education people on their democratic rights and obligations.

== Death ==
Mr. Bimi died at the Korle-Bu Teaching Hospital on 23 July 2011 after a short illness.
