= Ghana Women of Courage Award =

Women's rights in Ghana award for women

The Ghana Women of Courage Award similar to the International Women of Courage Award, is an American award presented by the United States Department of State to Ghanaian women who have shown leadership, courage, resourcefulness, and willingness to sacrifice for others, especially in promoting women's rights in Ghana.

== Award recipients by year ==
=== 2017 ===
- Charlotte Osei

=== 2019 ===
- Stella Saaka

=== 2020 ===
- Lydia Sasu

== See also ==
- List of awards honoring women
