= Centre for Plant Medicine Research =

Governmental organization in Ghana

- Formation: 1976; 50 years ago
- Type: Governmental organization
- Purpose: research into herbal medicine
- Website: www.cpmr.org.gh
- Formerly called: Centre for Scientific Research into Plant Medicine

The Centre for Plant Medicine Research, formerly the Centre for Scientific Research into Plant Medicine, is an institution for research into herbal medicine in Mampong Akuapem, in the Eastern Region of southern Ghana. It was set up by the government of Ghana in 1976. It produces its own herbal medicines and runs an out-patient clinic which treats more than 16,000 patients a month.
