= Charlotte Osei =

Ghanaian lawyer

Charlotte Kesson-Smith Osei
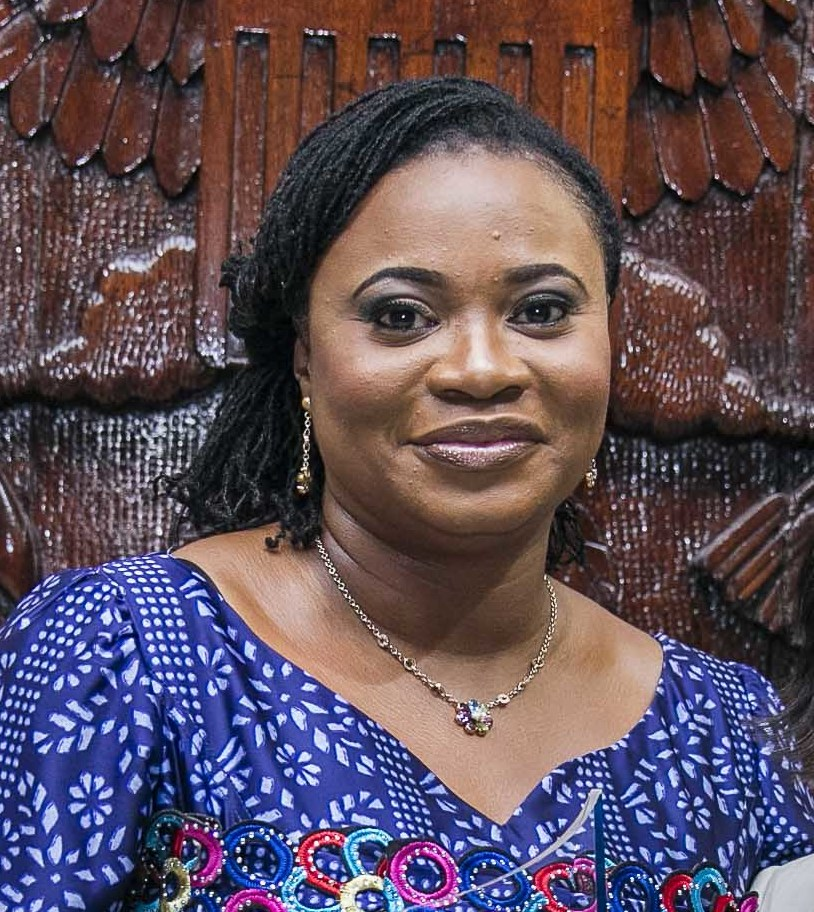

Chairperson of the Electoral Commission of Ghana
- In office 2015–2018
- President: John Dramani Mahama
- Preceded by: Kwadwo Afari-Gyan
- Succeeded by: Jean Adukwei Mensa

Chairperson of the National Commission for Civic Education
- In office 2011–2015
- Preceded by: Larry Bimi
- Succeeded by: Josephine Nkrumah

Personal details
- Born: 1 February 1969 (age 57)
- Education: University of Ghana; Ghana National College
- Profession: Lawyer

Charlotte Kesson-Smith Osei (born 1 February 1969) is a Ghanaian lawyer and former chairperson of the Electoral Commission of Ghana from 2015 until she was dismissed in June 2018 on grounds of financial malfeasance. Her dismissal has been challenged in the Supreme Court of Ghana in two separate writs. She became the first female to serve in the office of the Electoral Commission of Ghana since the country's independence. She was previously the chairperson of the National Commission for Civic Education. In May 2019, she was appointed by the United Nations to be on a team of international advisors, to assist in managing the 2019 presidential elections in Afghanistan.

== Early life and education ==
Charlotte Osei was born in Nigeria. Her mother, who is of mixed West African nationality, is not Ghanaian, and her father, also of mixed west African nationality, has a parent being Ghanaian.

Charlotte Osei had her secondary education at the Ghana National College in Cape Coast. She proceeded to the University of Ghana where she obtained her LLB in 1992 and Ghana School of Law to be called to the bar in 1994. She also holds Master of Business Leadership (MBL) from the University of South Africa, Pretoria (2006), Master of Laws, (LLM), from Queen’s University, Kingston, Ontario, Canada.

== Career ==
Charlotte Osei was a teaching assistant at the Faculty of Law, University of Ghana, Legon in 1994 to 1995. She worked as a lawyer for Laryea Company in Accra from 1994 to 1997, then as Senior Legal Officer at the Ghana Commercial Bank from 1997 until 2002. She also lectured part-time in commercial law at the university from 1997 until 2003.

From 2002 to 2005, Osei worked as general counsel for Unibank Ghana, and then from 2005 to 2011 as founder and lead counsel for business lawyers, Prime Attorneys. She was chairperson of the National Commission for Civic Education from 2011 to 2015. In 2015, she was appointed chairperson of the Electoral Commission of Ghana and she presided as the Returning Officer for Ghana's 2016 Presidential and Parliamentary elections. She was the first female to be appointed as the chairperson of the Electoral Commission of Ghana. In May 2019, the United Nations appointed Charlotte Osei as an International Non-Voting Electoral Commissioner to Afghanistan. This was confirmed by a Presidential Decree issued by the President of Afghanistan, Ashraf Ghani. As a Non-Voting Electoral Commissioner, she provided guidance to the Commission in the preparation and drafting of all election-related regulations and policies, and support in the adjudication of complaints in a fair, independent and legal manner to ensure electoral justice throughout the entire electoral cycle.

== Controversies and allegations ==
On 28 June 2018, Osei was removed following a committee set up by the Chief Justice, Justice Sophia Akuffo to investigate complaints and corruption allegations leveled against her. The committee was set up based on the provision stipulated under Article 146(4) of the Ghanaian constitution, the recommendations of the committee required Osei to be removed due to misbehavior pursuant to Article 146(1) of the constitution. The president of Ghana, Nana Akufo-Addo in accordance with the recommendations and provisions of Article156(9) of the Ghanaian constitution directed her immediate removal from office. The immediate past Chair of the Electoral Commission breached procurement laws in awarding several contracts prior to 2016 Ghana elections, a report by the committee that investigated her indicated. Osei indicated that she would respond to the accusations made against her later. She was delaying her response due to the sudden death of the immediate Vice President of Ghana, Kwesi Amissah-Arthur. The grounds for her dismissal are being challenged in the Supreme Court of Ghana by two separate writs filed by Fafali Nyonator and Abdul Malik Kweku Baako, a newspaper editor in Ghana.

== Awards and recognition ==
- 1991 Volta Hall Award, Best Arts Results, First University Examinations, University of Ghana
- Charlotte Osei was awarded a 'Women Of Courage' award by Robert P. Jackson., the United states ambassador to Ghana.
- PPP Skills & Competency Development, Institute for Public-Private Partnerships, Arlington, VA, USA (2009)
- Basic & Advanced Securities, Securities Selling & Investment Advice, Ghana Stock Exchange, Accra (1997)
- 1992 Ghana Bar Association, Excellence, LLB Final Examinations, University of Ghana

== Publications ==
- “Citizenship, Customary Law and a Gendered Jurisprudence: A Socio-Legal Perspective.” by C. Kesson-Smith and W. Tettey in "Critical Perspectives on Politics and Socio-Economic Development in Ghana" (African social studies series), Brill Publishers, 25 Apr 2003, editors: Tettey, Wisdom J., Puplampu, Korbla P., Berman, Joshua

== Personal life ==
Charlotte is married with two kids.

Preceded by Kwadwo Afari-Gyan	Chair of the Electoral Commission of Ghana; 2015 – 2018	Succeeded by Jean Adukwei Mensa
