= National Commission for Civic Education =

The National Commission for Civic Education (NCCE) is a public body in Ghana. The commission is responsible for the education of Ghanaians on civic matters. The commission was established by Act 452 of the Parliament of Ghana in 1993.

== Setup and membership ==
The commission is run by a seven-member committee that is headed by a chairperson, and includes two deputies and four members. The committee's membership is through appointment by the President of Ghana upon the advice of the Council of State.

=== Requirement of membership ===
Any member of the commission must by law be a Ghanaian national who possesses all the characteristics that qualify one to be elected as a Member of Parliament and must also be a non-executive in any political party.

=== Membership statuses ===
The members of the National Commission for Civic Education have varying rights depending on their status. "The Chairman of the Commission shall enjoy the same terms and conditions of service as a Justice of the Court of Appeal, and a Deputy Chairman of the Commission shall enjoy the same terms and conditions of service as a Justice of the High Court". The other four members of the commission have their privileges and terms and conditions of their service approved by the Parliament of Ghana.

== Functions ==
Per the Constitution of Ghana, the commission is mandated to perform five functions:

1. develop and maintain with the community the sense of the principles and objectives of the Constitution of the Republic of Ghana as the fundamental law of Ghana;
2. educate and encourage the public to defend this Constitution at all times, against all forms of abuse and violation;
3. develop policies for the consideration of Government, from time to time, programmes at the national, regional and district levels aimed at realising the objectives of this Constitution;
4. formulate, implement and oversee programmes intended to inculcate in the citizens of Ghana awareness of their civic responsibilities and an appreciation of their rights an obligations as free people;
5. assess for the information of Government, the limitations to the achievement of true democracy arising from the existing inequalities between different strata of the population and make recommendations for re-dressing these inequalities.

== Notable works ==
The work of the NCCE comes to the fore during election years in Ghana when thorough public education is done to sensitize electorates about the voting procedure and their conducts before, during and after presidential and public elections. Prior to the 2012 Ghanaian general elections the commission educated all the electorates on the new biometric voting system that was going to be used.

== Collaborations ==
The commission collaborates with other bodies to ensure a greater reach of its functions. One of such bodies is the Ghana Institute of Linguistics, Literacy and Bible Translation GILLBT, with which to translate an abridged version of the 1992 Constitution of Ghana into 30 Ghanaian languages. It also partnered with the International Federation of Women Lawyers to translate the "Rights of Ghanaian Women" into minority languages. In November 2020, the European Union (EU) gave the commission a grant of one million Euros. This was to support the commission's campaign on civic responsibilities awareness creation and also the peace drive in the following month when election would be held. This was especially targeted at the five northern regions and was to last 18 months.

== Members ==
OFFICE	NAME	TERM
Chairman	Kathleen Addy	2022 - present
Deputy Chairman	Samuel Asare Akuamoah	2015 - present
Deputy Chairman	Victor K. Brobbey	present
Commission Member	Philomima Abena Anyidoho	present
Commission Member	Hajara Mohammed Ruffai	present
Commission Member	Dr. Simon Ofori Ametepey	present
Commission Member	Mr. Bright Kwabla Agbodeka	present
Commission Secretary / Right To Information (RTI) Officer	Lucille Hewlett Annan (Mrs.)	Present

The current chairman for the commission is Josephine Nkrumah. The deputy chairman is Samuel Asare Akuamoah. Josephine Nkrumah was appointed by President John Mahama as the chairman in December 2016.

== Past members ==
- Larry Bimi – Chairman (2009–2011)
- Charlotte Osei – Chairperson (2011–2015)
