= Amadu Sulley =

Ghanaian public servant (died 2025)

Deputy Chairperson of the Electoral Commission of Ghana
- In office 2012–2018
- President: John Evans Atta-Mills
- Preceded by: David Kanga

Personal details
- Died: 1 March 2025

Amadu Sulley (died 1 March 2025) was a Ghanaian public servant who was a onetime Deputy Chairperson of Electoral Commission of Ghana.

== Early life and education ==
Amadu Sulley had his elementary school education at Ghana National School (now Richard Akwei Memorial School) in Accra. He attended Accra Academy and Opoku Ware School for the Ordinary level and Advanced level certificates respectively. He continued to the University of Ghana and studied for a Diploma in Statistics obtained in 1985. He obtained a Post Graduate Certificate and Diploma in Public Administration at Ghana Institute of Management and Public Administration in 1993 and 1995 respectively. His project work was on the Ghanaian Electoral System.

== Life and career ==
Sulley was appointed deputy chairperson of the Ghanaian Electoral Commission in 2012 by then president, John Evans Atta-Mills. He had previously served as the Director of Research Monitoring and Evaluation at the same Commission until his promotion to the rank of Deputy chairperson. Sulley's appointment to the rank of a deputy chairperson was the first time a career electoral personnel had been appointed to that high rank. He served as the deputy chairperson in charge of operations at the Electoral Commission of Ghana until his dismissal in June 2018 for allegedly illegally transferring votes during the 2016 Ghanaian general election. Sulley died on 1 March 2025.
