= Electoral Commission of Ghana =

Official body responsible for public elections in Ghana

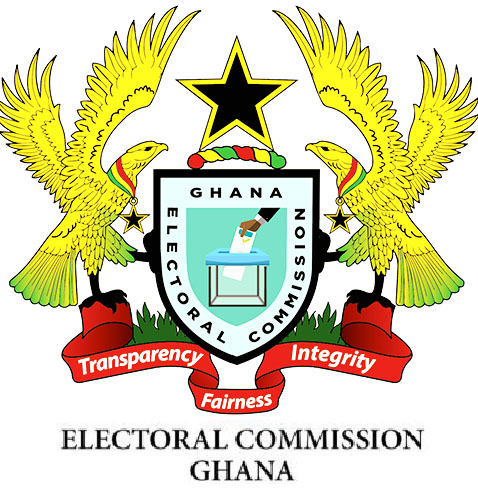
- Logo of the Electoral Commission of Ghana

Agency overview
- Formed: 1993
- Superseding agency: Interim National Electoral Commission
- Jurisdiction: Government of Ghana
- Headquarters: Accra; 5.5618706°N 0.2021849°W
- Agency executives: Chairman; Deputy chairman; Deputy chairman
- Child agencies: (etc.)
- Key document: www.ec.gov.gh/about-ec/
- Website: ec.gov.gh

The Electoral Commission of Ghana (EC) is the official body in Ghana responsible for all public elections. Made up of seven members and there are seven functional departments at the Head Office. Each department is headed by a Director who is assisted by Unit Heads. The departments are:- Electoral services; Human Resource; Finance; Training; Administration; Research, Monitoring & Evaluation; Information Technology. its independence is guaranteed by the 1992 Ghana constitution. The current commission was established by the Electoral Commission Act (Act 451) of 1993. Kwadwo Afari-Gyan was the first substantive chairman of the commission in the Fourth Republic of Ghana, from 1993 to 2015. He was succeeded by Charlotte Osei as the first female chairman of the commission from 2015 to June 2018. Jean Adukwei Mensah succeeded Charlotte Osei in July 2018. On December 5, 2018, the Electoral commission chaired by Jean Adukwei Mensah reverted to the old logo showing the Coat of arms of Ghana and a ballot box showing the hand casting its votes, after the controversy over the new logo.

As at 2023, there are 33,367 poling station across the country with 38,622 voting stations.

== Period before 1992 ==
=== Period up to 1972 ===
The Minister for Local Government was responsible for conducting elections during the First Republic until 1966. Following the 24 February coup in 1966 which overthrew Kwame Nkrumah's CPP government a committee for electoral reforms was set up. In 1968, V. C. R. A. C. Crabbe was appointed as the Interim Electoral Commissioner of the Interim Electoral Commission. The Interim Commission conducted the 1969 Ghanaian parliamentary election. In 1971, the Commission became permanent and G. A. K. Bonsu, Secretary to the Commission became the substantive Electoral Commissioner.

=== 1978 to 1981 ===
The National Redemption Council military government led by General Acheampong appointed Isaac Abban as Interim Electoral Commissioner to supervise the 1978 Ghanaian governmental referendum on Union Government. Abban went into hiding after the referendum on 30 March 1978 due to fear for his safety after resisting the rigging of the results. After the palace coup of 5 July 1978, another judge, Joseph Kingsley-Nyinah was appointed in his place. He supervised the 1979 Ghanaian general election which ushered in the Third Republic. T

== Members ==
The commission is made up of seven members. The position of chairman became vacant in June 2018 when the president, Nana Akufo-Addo sacked Charlotte Osei. This was apparently on the recommendation of a committee set up by Sophia Akuffo, the Chief Justice of Ghana. She was appointed by former President John Dramani Mahama, in consultation with the Council of State of Ghana in June 2015. Her two deputies were Amadu Sulley and Georgina Opoku Amankwah. Sulley Amadu was appointed by John Evans Atta Mills, the then Ghanaian President following the retirement of David Kangah who had served in that capacity for 19 years. Georgina Opoku Amankwah was appointed by President John Mahama to replace Sarfo-Kantanka who had served for about 20 years. She is the first female deputy chairman of the commission. There are four other members. Mrs. Paulina Adobea Dadzawa, an administrator and Ebenezer Aggrey Fynn, a Management Consultant were appointed by President Kufuor in consultation with the Council of State of Ghana in February 2004. In June 2018, the chairman, Charlotte Osei and her two deputies were sacked by Nana Akufo-Addo, President of Ghana following an investigation by a committee set up by the Chief Justice, Sophia Akuffo, following various allegations of fraud and corruption leveled against them. In July 2018, the President of Ghana, Nana Addo Dankwa Akuffo Addo nominated 4 EC top officials The new Electoral Commissioner, Jean Adukwei Mensa along with her two new deputies, Samuel Tettey and Eric Bossman as well as another new member Adwoa Asuama Abrefa were all sworn in by President Akufo-Addo on 1 August 2018. In February 2004, three members of the commission retired. They were Elizabeth Solomon, Mrs. Theresa Cole, and Professor Ernest Dumor. Another member, Dr. M. K. Puni, died in June 2005. Dixon Afreh is a former member of the Commission who left when he was appointed as a Justice of the Appeal Court in October 1994. The Electoral Commission of Ghana established a biometric system of registration for the electoral register prior to the 2012 presidential and parliamentary elections to prevent double registration and to eliminate ghost names in the old register. In preparation for the 2020 elections, 257 of the 260 offices all over the country were linked on the internet. MTN won the bid to provide the internet network and Persol Systems, the bid to build the Data Centre.

On 7 May 2024, the EC has started a limited voter registration exercise to register a targeted number of 623,000 eligible voters onto the electoral register. The 21-day exercise is meant for those who have turn 18 years and others who have not previously register to vote. This exercise is expected to be carry out in 1053 centers, made up 268 district offices of the EC and 758 additional centers in hard-to-reach areas agreed on by political parties. The limited voter registration exercise is expected on Monday 27 May 2024.

OFFICE	NAME	TERM
Chairman	Jean Adukwei Mensa	August 2018–present
Deputy chairman	Eric Asare Bossman	August 2018–present
Deputy chairman	Samuel Tettey	August 2018–present
Member	Mrs. Paulina Adobea Dadzawa	February 2004–present
Member	Salima Ahmed Tijani	March 2023–present
Member	Peter Appiahene	March 2023–present
Member	Rev Akua Ofori Boateng	March 2023–present
Member	Adwoa Asuama Abrefa	August 2018 – present
Past chairman
Chairman	V. C. R. A. C. Crabbe	1968–1971
Chairman	G. A. K. Bonsu	1971–1972
Chairman	Isaac Abban	1978
Chairman	Joseph Kingsley-Nyinah	1978–1981
Chairman	Josiah Ofori Boateng	1992–1993
Chairman	Kwadwo Afari-Gyan	1993 – June 2015
Chairman	Charlotte Osei	June 2015 – June 2018
Past Deputy chairman
Deputy chairman	Kwame Afreh	1992–1994
Deputy chairman	David Azey Adeenze-Kangah	1993 – April 2012
Deputy chairman	Kwadwo Sarfo-Kantanka	1993 – April 2013
Deputy chairman	Sulley Amadu	May 2012 – June 2018
Deputy chairman	Georgina Opoku Amankwaa	July 2013 – June 2018
Past members
Member	Dr M K Puni	? – June 1995
Member	Elizabeth Solomon	? – February 2004
Member	Theresa Cole	? – February 2004
Member	Ernest Dumor	? – February 2004
Member	Nana Amba Eyiiba I, Efutuhemaa	February 2004 – 2010
Member	Eunice Akweley Roberts	February 2004 – 2010
Member	Mrs. Paulina Adobea Dadzawa	February 2004 – 2018
Member	Ebenezer Aggrey Fynn	March 2004 – March 2023
Member	Sa-Adatu Maida	November 2010 – March 2023
Member	Rebecca Kabukie Adjalo	November 2010 – March 2023
Source:Electoral Commission of Ghana

== International support ==
The claim that the commission received a successful support to the close of elections of 2008, has made it a focus of African and international election reform organizations. In November 2009, a conference was held to analyze this election and tried to establish new standards and practices for African election commissions. It was held in Accra and was titled Colloquium on African Elections: Best Practices and Cross-Sectorial Collaboration. The conference was organized by a number of international election reform organizations including the National Democratic Institute, the Africa Center for Strategic Studies, the International Foundation for Electoral Systems, the Netherlands Institute for Multiparty Democracy, the Open Society Initiative for West Africa and UNDP.

== Former members ==
In February 2004, three members of the commission retired. They were Elizabeth Solomon, Mrs. Theresa Cole and Professor Ernest Dumor. Another member, Dr. M. K.Puni, died in June 2005. Dixon Afreh is a former member of the Commission who left when he was appointed as a Justice of the Appeal Court in October 1994. Three of the members were appointed by President John Kufuor in consultation with the Council of State of Ghana in February 2004 and sworn in on 5 March 2004. They are Mrs. Paulina Adobea Dadzawa, an administrator, Nana Amba Eyiiba I, Efutuhemaa and Krontihemaa of the Oguaa Traditional Area and Eunice Akweley Roberts, an educationist and human resource practitioner. They were all women. Ebenezer Aggrey Fynn, a management consultant was also appointed to the commission by the president to bring it to its full complement of seven members.

In June 2018, the chairperson, Charlotte Osei, and her two deputies, Amadu Sulley and Georgina Opoku Amankwah were removed from office by President Akufo-Addo on the recommendation of a committee set up by the chief justice.

== Elections ==
The Electoral Commission of Ghana established a biometric system of registration for the electoral register prior to the 2012 presidential and parliamentary elections to prevent double registration and to eliminate ghost names in the old register. In preparation towards the 2020 elections, 257 of the 260 offices all over the country were linked on the internet. MTN Ghana won the bid to provide the internet network and Persol Systems, the bid to build the Data center. Two weeks before the 2020 elections, the commission indicated that it had put in place resources to ensure that the results and declaration of winners, would be done within 24 hours of the end of voting.

== Preceding Institutions ==
The lives of Electoral Commissions prior to the Fourth Republic of Ghana were interrupted due to military coups. At the time of the UNIGOV referendum in 1976, Justice Isaac K. Abban was appointed by the Supreme Military Council under Ignatius Kutu Acheampong.

== Reform ==
In May 2021, the EC agreed on some proposals to reform the conduct of elections in the country, such as conduct of voter registration exercises all year round, exhibitions, filing of nominations and special voting. The E.C is seeking to change the presidential and parliamentary elections from December 7 to November 7. This falls under reforms yet to be implemented.

== Controversy ==
In September 2024, Bernard Mornah sued the EC over his disqualification from the presidential race. The EC later came to explain the reason he was disqualified.

== See also ==
- Elections in Ghana
- List of Ghana Parliament constituencies
- List of political parties in Ghana
