= Constitution of Ghana =

Supreme Law of Ghana

The Constitution of Ghana is the supreme law of the Republic of Ghana. It was approved on 28 April 1992 through a national referendum after 92% support. It defines the fundamental political principles, establishing the structure, procedures, powers and duties of the government, structure of the judiciary and legislature, and spells out the fundamental rights and duties of citizens. It is made up of 26 chapters, not including the preamble.

In part, the constitution was designed to decentralize the government in Ghana.

== Background ==
=== Timeline ===
Since its independence in 1957, Ghana has undergone several major changes in both the type of government and the democratic government itself. Ghana was first declared a republic in 1960 under the premiership of Kwame Nkrumah. By 1964, Ghana had transitioned from a republic to a one-party state with a presidential system where rights of the citizenry were eroded and political participation completely banned. Ghana would have an unstable political environment with several military takeovers in 1966, 1972, 1978, 1979, and 1981 despite the establishment of democratic administrations in 1969 and 1979. On April 28, 1992, a referendum was launched that approved the 1992 Constitution forming the current Ghanaian Fourth Republic. The 1992 Constitution was based upon the democratic principles established by the 1957, 1969, and 1979 Constitutions as well as 258 member Committee of Experts, who submitted a slew of Constitutional proposals that would be approved by the Consultative Assembly. The 1992 Constitution provided for the greater freedom of the press and human rights guarantees, a similar executive branch to the US with the president being elected in four-year terms, and the reinforcement of a unitary government while allowing for local governments. The Fourth Republic's first government was officially sworn in on January 7, 1993.

=== First Governments ===
Ghana's 1957 Constitution resembled the parliamentary democracy of Britain: where executive power was vested in the Queen and the Governor-General as her representative; the Cabinet was composed of members of Parliament; and Parliament as the main legislative that controlled Ghana's Government. The Constitution of 1957 formed Regional Assemblies: guaranteeing the establishment of the office of the Chief, "House of Chiefs" for each Region, and State Council to determine constitutional matters within the Region.

==== Second Republic ====
Ghana's Second Republic Constitution was drafted in January 1968. The Constitution holds the view that the traditional separations of power are outdated and it is the job of the President to preserve the independence of institutions. The executive is independent from the legislative and judiciary branches of government. The Second Republic Constitution used a decentralized form of government, where the local administrations served as extensions to the central government, which set the local administration's prerogative.

==== Third Republic ====
Before the inauguration of the first government of the Third Republic Constitution, Ghana established a "National Government" that would rule as a transitory government for "at least" four years. The Third Republic instituted a decentralized style of government through the creation of regional commissioners with cabinet standings, controlling the policy initiative of the locality and ideally balancing ethnic interests. The constitution established a provision that protected media outlets against censorship and afforded equal opportunities in state-run media outlets.

== Framing ==
=== Preamble ===
The introductory statement of the Ghanaian constitution. Guarantees the Principle of Universal Adult Suffrage; Freedom; Justice, Probity, and Accountability; and the protection and preservation of Fundamental Human Rights and Freedoms, United and Stability. The 1992 constitution drew primarily from the lessons from the previous 1957, 1960, 1969 and the 1979 constitutions and the British and United States constitution models, the preamble states clearly what the 1992 Ghanaian Constitution will employ when incorporated as the supreme law of Ghana.

=== Article 11 ===
Article 11 establishes that Ghanaian law shall consist of the Constitution, legislation, subsidiary or subordinate legislation, existing laws before the 1992 Constitution, and finally common law. This article establishes where Ghanaian Law would be derived from and by extension made. Article 11 establishes each governmental branch's contribution to the legislation and judiciary.

=== Article 17 ===
Article 17 of the Ghanaian Constitution directly addresses the issue of inequality and the illegality of discrimination based on the "grounds of gender, race, colour, ethnic origin, religion, creed or economic status. Section 3 of Article 17 defines discrimination as the "means to give different persons attributable only or mainly to their respective descriptions by race, place of origin, political opinions, colour, gender occupation, religion or creed, whereby persons of one description are subjected or restrictions." Article 17 legally defines the broad term of "discrimination", applying the concept of Universal Adult Suffrage to the basis of Ghanaian national law.

=== Article 24 ===
Article 24 establishes the economic rights of the Ghanaian citizenry. Clauses 1 and 2 establishe the right to work under satisfactory, safe, healthy conditions, and equal pay with the assurance of days off when requested and on public holidays. Additionally, Article 24 clause 3 grants the right of the Ghanaian citizenry to form or join trade unions for the "promotion and protection of his economic and social interests."

=== Article 25 ===
Article 25 describes the rights to education in Ghana. Clause 1 establishes the right of the Ghanaian citizenry to have access to equal education opportunities and the facilities are needed. Subclauses a to e of Article 25 detail how basic education is compulsory and free; secondary education will be accessible to all its citizenry; higher education will be accessible for all on the basis of the respective university's capacity to hold students; establishes the right to literacy; and the right for the school system to be granted adequate facilities to teach. Clause 2 grants the rights for the citizenry to homeschool and establish private schools in accordance with the rights to education established by clause 1.

=== Article 29 ===
Article 29 establishes the rights of disabled people to access educational opportunities and protections against institutional abuse. Clauses 1 to 4 describe the rights of disabled people and detail disabled people's protections against discrimination and abuse as defined by Article 17 of the constitution. Clause 5 guarantees disabled people as a party in their own judicial proceeding while factoring the court factors in disabled people person's mental and physical capacity. Clauses 6 and 8 guarantees the right of disabled people to have access to public and private facilities without discrimination, with clause 7 establishing special incentives for business that engage or employ disabled people in significant numbers. Clause 8 establishes that parliament shall laws ensure the enforcement of Article 29 and all of its clauses.

=== Article 41 ===
Article 41 urges the duties on the individual Ghanaian citizens and states that the exercise of rights and freedoms, guaranteed in the Constitution, are inseparable from the citizen's performance of their duties. Duty in Article 41 encompasses civil, political, economic, social, and cultural practices Ghanaians engage in.

== Division of powers ==
The 1992 constitution, as the supreme law of the land, provides for the sharing of powers among a president, a parliament, a cabinet, a Council of State, and an independent judiciary. Through its system of checks and balances, it avoids bestowing preponderant power on any specific branch of government. Executive authority is shared by the president, the twenty-five member Council of State, and numerous advisory bodies, including the National Security Council. The president is head of state, head of government, and commander in chief of the armed forces of Ghana. He also appoints the vice president.

Legislative functions are vested in the National Parliament, which consists of a unicameral 200-member body plus the president. To become law, legislation must have the assent of the president, who has a qualified veto over all bills except those to which a vote of urgency is attached. Members of parliament are popularly elected by universal adult suffrage for terms of four years, except in war time, when terms may be extended for not more than twelve months at a time beyond the four years.

The structure and the power of the judiciary are independent of all other branches of government. The Supreme Court has broad powers of judicial review; it rules on the constitutionality of any legislative or executive action at the request of any aggrieved citizen. The hierarchy of courts derives largely from British juridical forms. The hierarchy, called the Superior Court of Judicature, is composed of the Supreme Court of Ghana, the Court of Appeal (Appellate Court), the High Court of Justice, regional tribunals, and such lower courts or tribunals as parliament may establish. The courts have jurisdiction over all civil and criminal matters.

The 1992 constitution, like previous constitutions, guarantees the institution of chieftaincy together with its traditional councils as established by customary law and usage. The National House of Chiefs, without executive or legislative power, advises on all matters affecting the country's chieftaincy and customary law.

== See also ==
- 2019 Ghanaian constitutional referendum attempt
