= Minister for Youth and Sports (Ghana) =

Ministerial portfolio

The Minister for Youth and Sports in Ghana heads the Ministry of Youth and Sports. This role has been combined with the heading of other ministries in the past. Under the NRC and SMC military governments, it was headed by a Commissioner for Education, Culture and Sports. Under the Limann government, the head was the Minister for Culture and Sport. During the era of the PNDC military government, the head was designated the Secretary for Youth and Sports. During the Kufuor government period, the designations have included Minister for Education, Youth and Sports, Minister for Education and Sports and Minister for Education, Science and Sports. Following Ghana attaining a Republican status in 1960, President Kwame Nkrumah appointed Ohene Djan Director of Sports of the Central Organisation of Sports (COS). This position was of ministerial status. Colonel I. K. Acheampong who was Head of state of Ghana and Chairman of the ruling SMC also doubled as Commissioner for Sports until 1978. During this period, he appointed Lt. Colonel Simpe-Asante as the Special Assistant to the Commissioner for Sports.

== List of ministers ==
Number	Minister	Took office	Left office	Government	Party
1	Ohene Djan (Director of Sports)	1960	1966	Nkrumah government	Convention People's Party
2	Sebastian Kwaku Opon; Minister for Education, Culture and Sports	1969	?	Busia government	Progress Party
3	Oheneba Kow Aduako Richardson; Minister for Education, Culture and Sports	?	January 1972	Busia government	Progress Party
4	Lt-Colonel Paul Nkegbe (Commissioner for Education, Culture and Sports)	January 1972	1973	National Redemption Council	Military government
5	Colonel E. O. Nyante (Commissioner for Education, Youth and Culture)	1974	October 1975	National Redemption Council	Military government
6	Colonel Kutu Acheampong	October 1975	July 1978	Supreme Military Council	Military government
7	E. R. K. Dwemoh	1978	January 1979	Supreme Military Council	Military government
8	Kofi Badu	January 1979	June 1979	Supreme Military Council	Military government
8	Kofi Badu	June 1979	June 1979	Armed Forces Revolutionary Council	Military government
9	Nii Anyetei Kwakwranya	June 1979	September 1979	Armed Forces Revolutionary Council	Military government
10	Thomas G. Abilla	1979	30 December 1981	Limann government	People's National Party
11	Nii Anyetei Kwakwranya (Secretary for Youth and Sports)	1981	1982	Provisional National Defence Council	Military government
12	Zaya Yeebo (Secretary for Youth and Sports)	1982	1983	Provisional National Defence Council	Military government
13	Amarkai Amarteifio (Secretary for Youth and Sports)	1983	1986	Provisional National Defence Council	Military government
14	Ato Austin (Secretary for Youth and Sports)	1986	1988	Provisional National Defence Council	Military government
15	Kwame Saarah-Mensah (Secretary for Youth and Sports)	1988	1991	Provisional National Defence Council	Military government
16	Arnold Quainoo (Secretary for Youth and Sports)	1991	January 1993	Provisional National Defence Council	Military government
17	Enoch Teye Mensah (MP)	February 1993	January 2001	Rawlings government	National Democratic Congress
18	Mallam Isa	February 2001	March 2001	Kufuor government	New Patriotic Party
19	Papa Owusu-Ankomah (MP)	August 2001	October 2001	Kufuor government	New Patriotic Party
20	E. Osei Kweku	November 2001	April 2003	Kufuor government	New Patriotic Party
21	Kwadwo Baah Wiredu (MP)	April 2003	February 2005	Kufuor government	New Patriotic Party
22	Yaw Osafo-Maafo (MP)	February 2005	May 2006	Kufuor government	New Patriotic Party
23	Papa Owusu-Ankomah (MP)	May 2006	August 2007	Kufuor government	New Patriotic Party
24	Dominic Fobih (MP)	August 2007	January 2009	Kufuor government	New Patriotic Party
25	Muntaka Mohammed Mubarak (MP)	February 2009	June 2009	Mills government	National Democratic Congress
26	Abdul-Rashid Pelpuo (MP)	July 2009	January 2010	Mills government	National Democratic Congress
27	Akua Sena Dansua (MP)	February 2010	January 2011	Mills government	National Democratic Congress
28	Clement Kofi Humado (MP)	February 2011	July 2012	Mills government	National Democratic Congress
28	Clement Kofi Humado (MP)	July 2012	January 2013	Mahama government	National Democratic Congress
29	Elvis Afriyie Ankrah	February 2013	July 2014	Mahama government	National Democratic Congress
30	Mahama Ayariga (MP)	July 2014	March 2015	Mahama government	National Democratic Congress
31	Mustapha Ahmed (MP)	March 2015	January 2016	Mahama government	National Democratic Congress
32	Nii Lante Vanderpuye	January 2016	January 2017	Mahama government	National Democratic Congress
33	Isaac Kwame Asiamah (MP)	February 2017	January 2021	Akufo-Addo government	New Patriotic Party
34	Mustapha Ussif (MP)	March 2021	January 2025	Akufo-Addo government	New Patriotic Party
35	Kofi Adams (MP) (Minister for Sports and Recreation)	7 February 2025	Incumbent	Mahama government 2	National Democratic Congress

== See also ==
- Ministry of Youth and Sports (Ghana)
