= Minister for Labour (Ghana) =

The Minister for Labour in Ghana is responsible for employment and labour relations throughout the country. The designation of this position has varied from government to government. The Minister was originally known as the Minister for Labour, Social Welfare and Cooperatives. This official has at various times also been known as the Minister for Labour and Social Welfare, Minister for Labour, Youth and Social Welfare and the Minister for Employment and Social Welfare. The current designation is the Minister for Labour, Jobs and Employment.

The Minister is appointed by the President of Ghana with the approval of the Parliament of Ghana.

== List of Ministers ==
The minister is appointed by the President of Ghana and is assisted by at least one deputy.

Number	Minister	Took office	Left office	Government	Party
Minister for Labour, Social Welfare and Cooperatives
1	Francis Yao Asare (MP) (Minister for Labour, Co-operatives and Social Welfare)	22 May 1957	?	Nkrumah government	Convention People's Party
2	Osei Owusu Afriyie (MP) (MP) (Labour and Social Welfare)	c. 1962	1965	Nkrumah government	Convention People's Party
3a	K. Amoa-Awuah (MP)	1 February 1965	?	Nkrumah government	Convention People's Party
3b	Susanna Al-Hassan (MP) (Social Welfare and Community Development) (MP)	1 February 1965	?	Nkrumah government	Convention People's Party
Commissioner for Labour and Social Welfare
4	S. T. Nettey	1966	1969	National Liberation Council	Military government
Minister for Labour and Social Welfare
5	Jatoe Kaleo (MP)	1969	1971	Busia government	Progress Party
6	William Godson Bruce-Konuah (MP)	1971	1972	Busia government	Progress Party
Commissioner for Labour, Social Welfare and Co-operatives
7	Major Kwame Asante	1972	1973	National Redemption Council	Military government
8	Major K. B. Agbo	1973	19 October 1975	National Redemption Council	Military government
9	Commander Joy Amedume	9 October 1975	?	Supreme Military Council	Military government
10	Nii Anyetei Kwakwranya	c. 1978		Supreme Military Council	Military government
11	Anthony Woode	1979	24 September 1979	Armed Forces Revolutionary Council	Military government
Minister for Labour, Youth and Social Welfare
12	Frank Q. Amega	1979		Limann government	People's National Party
13	Adisa Munkaila	November 1980	December 1981	Limann government	People's National Party
Secretary for Labour and Social Welfare
13	Adisa Munkaila	1982	1983	Provisional National Defence Council	Military government
14	Ato Austin	1983	1986	Provisional National Defence Council	Military government
15	W. H. Yeboah	1986	1987	Provisional National Defence Council	Military government
16	Huudu YahayaClegg, Sam, ed. (29 November 1988).	c. 1988	?	Provisional National Defence Council	Military government
17	George Adamu	?	1992	Provisional National Defence Council	Military government
18	D. S. Boateng	1992	1993	Provisional National Defence Council	Military government
Minister for Employment and Social Welfare
18	D. S. Boateng	1993	1997	Rawlings government	National Democratic Congress
19	Muhammad Mumuni	1997	January 2001	Rawlings government	National Democratic Congress
Minister for Manpower Development and Employment
20	Cecilia Bannerman	9 February 2001	2003	Kufuor government	New Patriotic Party
21	Yaw Barimah	1 April 2003	1 February 2005	Kufuor government	New Patriotic Party
Ministry for Manpower, Youth and Employment
22	Joseph Kofi Adda	1 February 2005	28 April 2006	Kufuor government	New Patriotic Party
23	Abubakar Boniface Siddique	28 April 2006	2007	Kufuor government	New Patriotic Party
24	Nana Akomea	2007	6 January 2009	Kufuor government	New Patriotic Party
Minister for Employment and Social Welfare
25	Stephen Amoanor Kwao (MP)	2009	2010	Mills government	National Democratic Congress
26	Enoch Teye Mensah (MP)	2010	2012	Mills government	National Democratic Congress
27	Moses Asaga (MP)	2012	24 July 2012	Mills government	National Democratic Congress
Minister for Employment and Labour Relations
28	Nii Armah Ashitey (MP)	14 February 2013	16 July 2014	Mahama's 1st government	National Democratic Congress
29	Haruna Iddrisu (MP)	16 July 2014	6 January 2017	Mahama's 1st government	National Democratic Congress
30	Ignatius Bafuor Awuah (MP)	7 February 2017		Akufo-Addo government	New Patriotic Party
Minister for Labour, Jobs and Employment
31	Abdul-Rashid Pelpuo (MP)	7 February 2025	26 August 2026	Mahama's 2nd government	New Democratic Congress
32	Emmanuel Kwadwo-Agyekum (MP)	26 August 2026	Incumbent	Mahama's 2nd government	New Democratic Congress
