= Kojo Tsikata =

Ghanaian military officer and politician (1936–2021)

Tsikata

Member of the PNDC
- In office July 1985 – 6 January 1993
- President: Jerry Rawlings

Personal details
- Born: 4 May 1936 Gold Coast
- Died: 20 November 2021 (aged 85) Ghana
- Citizenship: Ghanaian
- Party: National Convention Party
- Spouse: Zonke Majodina
- Relations: Tsatsu Tsikata
- Education: Achimota School
- Occupation: Soldier

Military service
- Allegiance: Ghana Armed Forces
- Branch/service: Ghana Army
- Rank: Captain
- Unit: Recce Regiment

Kojo Tsikata (4 May 1936 – 20 November 2021) was a Ghanaian military officer and politician, who served as the Head of National Security and Foreign Affairs of the Provisional National Defence Council (PNDC). He was listed as a retired army captain in the Ghana Army.

== Early life and education ==
Tsikata was born in 1936. He attended Achimota School for his secondary education. One of his student colleagues was Obed Asamoah who later became the longest serving Minister for Foreign Affairs in Ghana. While there, he was influenced by a recruitment drive to join the Ghana Army after completing his secondary education. He was sent to England where he attended the officer cadet course at the Royal Military Academy Sandhurst.

== Biography ==
Tsikata was very keen on the pan-African ideas of Kwame Nkrumah and others. Together with Obed Asamoah, they were ready to go fight in the Algerian war of independence but were dissuaded by Frantz Fanon who was the representative of the Algerian government in exile in Ghana.

Tsikata was sent to the Congo with Major General Ankrah as part of a Ghanaian military contingent with orders from Kwame Nkrumah to protect the Pan-Africanist and anti-neocolonialist Patrice Lumumba, who was the Prime Minister. In 1964, he was in Angola where he joined MPLA fighters and internationalist fighters from Cuba. He continued to serve there supporting liberation movements until the overthrow of the Nkrumah government by the National Liberation Council (NLC) military government. The Special Branch of the security services under the NLC declared Tsikata a wanted person in March 1967 in line with an important investigation. He was reported to have been in Brazzaville, in Conakry in 1966 and last seen in Togo in November 1966. He fell out with the officers who overthrew Kwame Nkrumah and stayed in exile until the military handed over power to the civilian government of Kofi Abrefa Busia.

He visited Conakry, Guinea, to see Nkrumah. He was arrested, detained, and put on death row as a suspect of an assassination plot against Nkrumah on his arrival. Samora Machel, a freedom fighter and later president of Mozambique, intervened to get him pardoned. Samora travelled with him back to Mozambique.

In 1976, he was arrested together with others for attempting to overthrow the National Redemption Council (NRC) military government led by Colonel Kutu Acheampong. That plot became known as the "One Man One Matchet" coup. His code-name mentioned during the trial was "gbagbladza" which is cockroach in the Ewe language. Others arrested with him were Victor Latzoo, a retired lieutenant in the Ghana Army, Staff Sergeant Godfried K. Amereka, Warrant Officer H. Raphael Nyatepeh, Captain Gustav K. Banini, Corporal John Gbeeze, Francis Agboada and Michael Hamenoo. The leader Brigadier Khattah whose code-name during the plot was "Amega" meaning "Boss" in Ewe escaped arrest. Tsikata chose to defend himself without counsel and pointed out contradictions in the evidence provided against him. Amnesty International raised concerns about the trial and the torture of Tsikata and others. Tsikata, Staff Sergeant Godfried Amereka, Warrant Officer Raphael Nyatepeh, Francis Agboada and Michael Hamenoo were sentenced to death. Two others were sentenced to eighteen years in jail.

During the rule of the Limann government, Tsikata found himself under open surveillance by the country's security agencies. Wilhelm Harrison Buller, a British Honduran national and friend of Tsikata was arrested at the residence of Jerry Rawlings for overstaying his visa. He was accused of working to destabilise Ghana's constitutional order and was deported. He was accused of collaborating with Tsikata, Tsatsu Tsikata and Brigadier Arnold Quainoo, an accusation which was denied by all three. As the saga continued, Tsikata took about nineteen intelligence officers to the High Court suing for harassment. The court found in his favour, stating that his human rights could only be violated for compelling reasons and granted him damages. This did not stop entirely and Tsikata ended up escaping to exile in Lomé, capital of Togo.

In August 1981, he took the Ghana Military Intelligence to an Accra High Court seeking an injunction to bar them from tailing him. His contention was that "beatings allegedly suffered during interrogation by Military Intelligence officers constituted inhuman treatment and that his continuous surveillance by Military Intelligence constituted "unlawful interference in his human, constitutional and civil rights". This injunction was not granted by the High Court.

== Role in government ==
He was appointed Special Adviser in 1982 under the Provisional National Defence Council (PNDC) government led by Jerry Rawlings. He had been in charge of national security since 1982. He also served as a member of the Council of State of Ghana. In July 1985, he was appointed as a substantive member of the PNDC in charge of National Security and Foreign Affairs. He is credited with the setting up of the security network which ensured the survival of the PNDC.

In 1995, he was asked to join a negotiating team to help restore peace to Liberia during the First Liberian Civil War. With him were Mohamed Ibn Chambas who was the then Deputy Foreign Minister, and Brigadier General Agyemfra, accompanied by Harry Mouzillas from the Ghana News Agency as a journalist to cover the events. They travelled to join James Victor Gbeho, the Resident Representative of then Chairman of the Economic Community of West African States (ECOWAS), Flt Lt Jerry John Rawlings and Mr. Ate Allotey, a diplomat.

He was appointed by Gaddafi to a senior advisory position in charge of the Al Mathaba central committee, a support centre for the liberation movement and anti-imperialist and anti-Zionist organisations.

== Ghana-United States relations ==
During 1985 while he was Head of National Security, a United States spy ring organised by the CIA to help overthrow the PNDC government was disrupted in what became known as the Sharon Scranage espionage scandal. This was done using Michael Soussoudis, a Ghanaian national resident in the United States, to convince Sharon Scranage, a United States citizen working at their embassy in Accra at the time, to pass on the names of Ghanaians working for the CIA, according to information declassified in 2011.

== Murder of three high court judges ==
A retired supreme court judge, Justice G. E. K. Aikins, intimated that Captain Tsikata was implicated in the kidnapping and murder of three high court judges and a retired army officer on 30 June 1983 during the PNDC regime and was never tried. Among the suspects were Captain Kojo Tsikata and Sergeant Aloga Akata-Pore, both key members of the then PNDC. Ghanaians brought Tsikata under scrutiny, but during the National Reconciliation Commission (NRC) hearing he denied being involved with the killing of the judges. The Special Investigation Board (SIB) stated unequivocally that Kojo Tsikata was the mastermind behind the abduction and killing of the three high court judges and the retired army officer. One reason was that, before the execution of the sole witness, he withdrew his accusation against Captain Tsikata. Joachim Amartey Quaye, one of the architects of the murderous incident, was imprisoned and some soldiers, Tekpor, Dzandzu, and Helki, were all found guilty of murder, sentenced to death, and executed by firing squad. One of the convicted, Amedeka, escaped prison and has not been seen since.

Tsikata appeared before the National Reconciliation Commission set up by the Kufuor government to look into human rights violations in Ghana between 1967 and 1993. He stated that the allegations that he was involved in the murder of the High Court judges was a frame up. He named Samuel Azu Crabbe, member of the board and Chief Justice of Ghana between 1973 and 1977 and Brigadier Nunoo-Mensah, Chief of the Defence Staff in 1979 and 1982 as being involved in the conspiracy against him. He claimed that the statement by Nunoo-Mensah dated 23 November 1982 was proof that he was aware of the contents Amartey Quaye will be making on the same day. He requested for an opportunity to cross examine them but this was refused.

During his testimony, he narrated how he was tortured in December 1975 and January 1976 under the orders of Francis Poku, who was at the time a Deputy Superintendent of Police at the Special Branch for refusing to sign a confession stating that he was attempting to overthrow the Supreme Military Council government. He claimed that his case as well as that of one Emmanuel Allotey who died in detention were documented by Amnesty International. Francis Poku was Minister for National Security in the Kufuor government at the time the National Reconciliation Commission was taking evidence from witnesses. Tsikata used this to buttress his point that the human rights violations occurred under all Ghanaian governments and that the commission should ensure it was not seen as being partisan or discriminatory.

== Party politics ==
Tsikata who was the patron of two pro-Nkrumah groups, the Kwame Nkrumah Youngsters Club and the Kwame Nkrumah Welfare Society was instrumental in getting them to merge to form the National Convention Party (NCP) prior to the 1992 Ghanaian presidential election and 1992 parliamentary election. He together with P. V. Obeng and Ebo Tawiah were also influential in the NCP going into electoral alliance with the National Democratic Congress (NDC) in 1992.

John Mahama, President of Ghana between July 2012 and January 2017 said Tsikata was an important advisor to him as well as being instrumental in the stability of the Fourth Republic of Ghana.

Nana Akufo-Addo, President of Ghana shortly after winning the 2016 Ghanaian general election, thanked Tsikata among others for his invaluable advice.

== Awards ==
Captain Kojo Tsikata received one of Angola's highest honours, known as Carlos Silva among Angolan fighters, for his role in the struggle for national independence.

Tsikata was a holder of the Solidarity Award and of the Order of "Carlos Manuel de Céspedes", conferred by the Council of State of the Republic of Cuba.

In September 2018 he was honoured with an award by the Socialist Forum of Ghana at the Pan African Conference which took place at the University of Education, Winneba.

He rejected a national award to be conferred on him in the category of the Companion of the Order of the Volta by President Kuffour. He was listed as one of the six government officials under the NDC regime to receive the award.

== Death and funeral ==
Tsikata died after a short illness in Accra. A private funeral was held for him according to his wishes on 9 December 2021. Former Côte d'Ivore president Laurent Gbagbo who attended the funeral in Accra described Tsikata as "the old brother of revolutionaries". He also mentioned that Tsikata looked after his mother while she was in exile in Ghana.
