= 1980s in Ghana =

1980s in Ghana details events of note that happened in Ghana in the years 1980 to 1989.

== Incumbents ==
- President: Hilla Limann (1979–1981)
- President: Jerry Rawlings (1981–2000)

== Events ==
- 31 December 1981 - in another Jerry Rawlings -led coup the Hilla Limann government is overthrown.
- 31 December 1981 - the Provisional National Defense Council (PNDC) forms a new government.
- 5 January 1982 - Jerry Rawlings presents a detailed statement explaining the factors that necessitated the termination of the Third Republic in a radio broadcast.
- June 1982 - an attempted coup attempt discovered, those implicated are executed.
- 1983 - more than one million Ghanaians return to Ghana after being expelled from Nigeria.
- 1983-84 - widespread bush fires devastate crop production.
- 1987 - economic progress results in a drop of inflation to 20 percent.

== National holidays ==
- January 1: New Year's Day
- March 6: Independence Day
- May 1: Labor Day
- December 25: Christmas
- December 26: Boxing Day

In addition, several other places observe local holidays, such as the foundation of their town. These are also "special days."
