= Nelson Agbesi =

Ghanaian barrister and politician

Honourable Nelson Yawo Avega Agbesi

Member of Parliament for Dayi East
- In office 24 September 1979 – 31 December 1981
- President: Hilla Limann
- Preceded by: Daniel Kwasi Avoke (1969–1972)
- Succeeded by: Ceased to exist
- Constituency: Dayi East

19th Minister for Food and Agriculture (Ghana)
- In office December 1980 – 31 December 1981
- President: Hilla Limann
- Preceded by: E. K. Andah
- Succeeded by: Bortei Doku

10th Volta Regional Minister
- In office December 1979 – December 1980
- President: Hilla Limann
- Preceded by: Lt. Colonel G. K. Amevor (Regional Commissioner)
- Succeeded by: F. Q. Amegah

Personal details
- Born: 16 November 1939 Liati Wote, Gold Coast
- Died: 11 May 2016 (aged 76)
- Resting place: Liati Wote, Ghana
- Party: People's National Party
- Education: University of Ghana
- Profession: Lawyer

Nelson Yawo Avega Agbesi (1939–2016) was a Ghanaian barrister and politician.

== Early life and education ==
Nelson Agbesi was born on 16 November 1939 at Liati Wote in the then Trans-Volta Togoland and later Gold Coast but now in the Volta Region of Ghana. Between 1956 and 1961, Nelson received his secondary education at Mawuli School where he obtained the GCE Ordinary level and Advanced level. He entered the University of Ghana where he read law. He completed in 1964, graduating with the Bachelor of Arts Honours in Law. He continued to the Ghana Law School which he completed in 1996. He was called to the Bar in October 1966.

== Law career ==
Agbesi first worked as a junior legal practitioner with Lynes Quarshie Idun and partners between 1966 and 1969. He became the senior partner Ameyi Chambers from 1969 until 1979 when he became a member of parliament. He rejoined the Ameyi Chambers in November 1982. On 15 March 1989, he established the Afadzato Chambers in Accra.

== Politics ==
Agbesi was a member of the People's National Party. He contested the 1979 Ghanaian general election and won the East Dayi seat. He became a Member of Parliament from 24 September 1979 until parliament was dissolved and the constitution suspended on 31 December 1981.

Agbesi was made a Minister of State by President Hilla Limann. He was first appointed the Volta Regional Minister in December 1979. He held this post until December 1980 when he was shifted to Minister for Food and Agriculture replacing E. K. Andah in a cabinet reshuffle. He held this position until the 1981 Ghanaian coup d'état replaced the Limann government with the Provisional National Defence Council of Jerry Rawlings. Agbesi was detained at Nsawam Prisons following the coup. No adverse findings were made against him by the National Investigations Committee so he was released from custody.

== Other activities ==
Agbesi was a member of the Lions Clubs International. He was made a District Governor and the Melvin Jones Fellowship for his meritorious services. The Tema Supreme Lions Club built the Lion Nelson Agbesi Solar Learning Shed on the Yatsovukope Island on the Volta Lake in his honour to help children have a place of study after school. Agbesi was instrumental in getting the Lions Club to help finance a Community Clinic at Liati Wote in 2004.

== Family ==
Agbesi's parents were Patrick Kosi Avega who was Mankrado Adzotsomor III of Liati Wote and Philomena Akosuavi Masroh of Agu Akumawu in the Togo. He was married to Nayra Klu for 47 years until his death. He had seven children. He was laid to rest in a mausoleum near his residence at Liati Wote in the Volta Region.
