= Michael Paul Ansah =

Ghanaian politician (1928–2005)

Minister for Industry, Science and Technology
- In office August 1981 – 31 December 1981
- President: Hilla Limann
- Preceded by: Vincent W. Bulla

Minister for Health
- In office September 1979 – August 1981
- President: Hilla Limann
- Preceded by: Emmanuel Evans Anfom
- Succeeded by: Kwamena Ocran

Member of Parliament for Mid-Volta
- In office 1979 – 31 December 1981
- President: Kwame Nkrumah
- Preceded by: John Kwabena Arjarquah
- Succeeded by: Constituency abolished

Member of Parliament for Akwamu
- In office 1965 – February 1966
- Preceded by: New
- Succeeded by: Constituency abolished

Personal details
- Born: Michael Paul Ansah; 31 October 1928 Anum, Eastern Region, Gold Coast
- Died: 13 March 2005 (aged 76)
- Citizenship: Ghanaian
- Party: Convention People's Party; People's National Party
- Education: Presbyterian Secondary School, Krobo Odumase; Akropong Teacher Training College; University of Ghana

Michael Paul Ansah (31 October 1928 – 13 March 2005) was a Ghanaian politician and educationist. He served as member of parliament for the Akwamu constituency from 1965 to 1966 in the First Republic and member of parliament for the Mid-Volta constituency from 1979 to 1981 in the Third Republic. He was Ghana’s Minister for Health from 1979 to 1981 and the Minister for Industry, Science and Technology from August 1981 to December 1981.

== Early life and education ==
Ansah was born on 31 October 1928 in Anum, a town in the Eastern Region. He had his early education at the Mampong-Akwapim Primary School from 1935 to 1940. He had his middle school education at the Akropong-Akwapim Middle School and the Begoro Middle School from 1941 to 1942 and from 1942 to 1944 respectively. He entered the Presbyterian Secondary School (now Presbyterian Boys' Senior High School) in 1945 completing in 1949. He later had his post-secondary education at the Akropong Teacher Training College (now the Presbyterian College of Education, Akropong) where he obtained his Teachers' Certificate 'A'. After a few years in the teaching profession he entered the University of Ghana, Legon graduating with a degree in history in 1959. He later read politics and anthropology at the Institute of African Studies at the University of Ghana graduating in 1965. He was the first president and founder of the Students Historical Association at the University of Ghana he was also the founder and first secretary of the Akwamu Youth League in 1958 (now Akwamu Students Union).

== Career ==
Ansah begun teaching at the Presbyterian Secondary School at Odumase Krobo until he was transferred to the Institute of Arts and Culture on 30 June 1962. In 1965, he was appointed headmaster of O'Reilly Secondary School.

== Politics ==
In June 1965 Ansah was elected as member parliament for the Akwamu Constituency under the Convention Peoples Party regime. He served in this capacity until February 1966 when the Nkrumah government was overthrown.

On 24 September 1979 when the third republic was ushered in, he entered parliament representing the Mid-Volta constituency on the ticket of the People's National Party where he was elected as Majority Leader and Leader of the House. That same year, he was appointed a Cabinet Minister under the Minister for Health and he remained in that post until he was moved to the Ministry for Industry, Science and Technology in 1981. He served in that capacity until the Limann government was ousted by the Provisional National Defence Council (PNDC) on 31 December 1981.

== Personal life and death ==
Ansah's hobbies included gardening, playing lawn tennis and listening to music. He was married to Dora Ansah (née Arjarquah), with whom he had 6 children.

Ansah died on 13 March 2005, at the age of 76.

== See also ==
- Minister for Health
- List of MPs elected in the 1965 Ghanaian parliamentary election
- List of MPs elected in the 1979 Ghanaian parliamentary election
