= Kwame Sanaa-Poku Jantuah =

Ghanaian politician and academic

Minister for Interior
- In office October 1981 – December 1981
- President: Hilla Limann
- Preceded by: Ekow Daniels
- Succeeded by: Asiedu Yirenkyi

Ambassador to the German Democratic Republic
- In office late–1980s
- President: Jerry Rawlings

Ambassador to Brazil
- In office early–1960s
- President: Kwame Nkrumah

Personal details
- Born: Kwame Antoa Onyinaa Jantuah; 21 December 1922 Kumasi, Ghana
- Died: 3 February 2011 (aged 88) Accra, Ghana
- Party: Convention People's Party
- Other political affiliations: People's National Party
- Relations: F. A. Jantuah (Brother)
- Education: St. Augustine's College; University of Oxford; College of Law

Kwame Sanaa-Poku Jantuah (21 December 1922 – 3 February 2011), originally known as John Ernest Jantuah, was a Ghanaian politician, lawyer and diplomat.

== Early life and education ==
Jantuah was born on 21 December 1922 at Kejetia, a suburb of Kumasi, in the Ashanti Region of what was then the Gold Coast (present-day Ghana). He was baptised on 19 May 1934 and he was given the Christian names John and Ernest at the St. Peter's Catholic Church in Kumasi. In 1936, Jantuah went to St. Theresa's Junior Seminary at Amissano, near Elmina, for training. He attended St. Augustine's College from 1943 to 1944. He proceeded to the United Kingdom to study politics and economics at the University of Oxford (Plater College) on an Asanteman Council scholarship set up by the late Ashanti king (Asantehene), Otumfuo Sir Osei Tutu Agyeman Prempeh II. Jantuah entered the College of Law in 1964 and obtain his LLB and BL degrees in 1966. He was called to the Bar at Lincoln's Inn and later to the Ghana bar.

He was known formally as John Ernest Jantuah until 21 December 1962, when he changed his name to Kwame Sanaa-Poku Jantuah.

== Career and politics ==
Jantuah was a member of the Convention People's Party (CPP) served as an Agriculture minister and a cabinet minister in the Nkrumah government of the first republic. He also served as the Interior Minister during the Limann government. He served as the Acting High Commissioner to the United Kingdom in the 1950s, the first resident Ambassador to France and the Ambassador to the German Democratic Republic in the late 1980s during the PNDC era. He was also the ambassador to Brazil during the Nkrumah era. He served as member of the CPP until his death.

== Honours ==
Jantuah was one of many Ghanaians to receive national awards on 6 July 2007 in Accra.

== Personal life ==
Kwame Sanaa-Poku Jantuah was the elder brother of Ghanaian politician, F. A. Jantuah. He died after a short illness in Accra on 3 February 2011, aged 88. He was a staunch Roman Catholic was buried on 26 March in his home town at Mampongteng in the Ashanti Region.

== Publications ==
Jantuah is the author of Death of an empire : Kwame Nkrumah in Ghana and Africa which was published posthumously in 2017.

== See also ==
- Limann government
- F. A. Jantuah

Diplomatic posts
Preceded by ?	Ambassador to Brazil; 1962	Succeeded by ?
Preceded by ?	Ambassador to German Democratic Republic; 1988	Succeeded by ?
Political offices
Preceded by Ekow Daniels	Minister for Interior; 1981	Succeeded by Asiedu Yirenkyi
Preceded by ?	Minister for Justice (Gold Coast); 1951–1954	Succeeded by ?
Preceded by ?	Minister for Fisheries and Agriculture (Gold Coast); 1954–1956	Succeeded by Boahene Yeboah-Afari
