= Ebo Tawiah =

Ghanaian unionist and politician (1946–2018)

Provisional National Defence Council Member
- In office August 1982 – ?
- President: Jerry Rawlings

National Chairman of National Convention Party

Personal details
- Born: 1946
- Died: 24 March 2018 (aged 71–72)
- Resting place: Osu Cemetery, Accra

Ebo Tawiah is a Ghanaian unionist and politician. He was a member of the Provisional National Defence Council (PNDC) military government led by Jerry Rawlings which ruled Ghana after the overthrow of the Limann government.

== Unionist ==
Prior to his involvement in politics, Tawiah was a Trade Unionist. In 2019, Tawiah was honoured post-humously along with Jerry Rawlings and others with an award by the Ghana Mineworkers Union's during their 75th Anniversary celebrations.

== Politics ==
Tawiah was a member of the Socialist Forum of Ghana. He was also an activist of the Convention People's Party led by Kwame Nkrumah and campaigned for the banned party to be reinstated.

Tawiah was appointed to the PNDC in August 1982 along with Aanaa Enin, this was following the resignations of Reverend Father Damuah and Amartey Quaye. During the PNDC era, Paul Collins Appiah Ofori who later became MP for Asikuma-Odoben-Brakwa claimed that he had been wrongfully detained under the military regime and Tawiah was instrumental along with Rawlings in his release.

Following the return to constitutional rule, Tawiah joined the National Convention Party (NCP) which was one of the parties of the Nkrumah tradition. He was its chairman for a period. The NCP went into an alliance with the NDC led by Jerry Rawlings for the 1992 Ghanaian presidential election.

In 2011, he publicly backed the bid by the Ghanaian president John Atta Mills for nomination by the National Democratic Congress to stand on its ticket in the 2012 Ghanaian general election for president.

== Death ==
Tawiah died in March 2018. He was buried at the Osu Cemetery in Accra.
