= Adisa Munkaila =

Ghanaian politician

Member of the Council of State of Ghana
- In office March 2001 – 6 January 2005
- President: John Kufuor

Minister for Labour and Social Welfare
- In office 14 November 1980 – 31 December 1981
- President: Hilla Limann
- Vice President: Joseph W.S. de Graft-Johnson
- Preceded by: Frank Q. Amega
- Succeeded by: Ato Austin

Personal details
- Party: Convention People's Party
- Other political affiliations: People's National Party
- Relatives: Alhassan Wayo Seini
- Education: Achimota School

Adisa Munkaila is a Ghanaian politician.

== Early life and education ==
Adisa Munkaila had her secondary education at the Achimota School in the northern suburbs of Accra.

== Politics ==
Munkaila was a Deputy Minister in the People's National Party government under President Hilla Limann during the third republic. She was later promoted after a cabinet reshuffle on 14 November 1980 to Minister for Labour and Social Welfare by President Limann. She was the first woman to lead this ministry in Ghana.

Munkaila was a member of the Convention People's Party during the fourth republic. Prior to the 2008 Ghanaian general election, she was on the party's vetting committee for its presidential candidates.

Munkaila was one of eleven people appointed as a member of the Council of State of Ghana in 2001 by John Kufuor, President of Ghana. She served between March 2001 and January 2005.

== Other roles ==
Munkaila served as the chairperson of the executive board of the Northern Network for Education Development which was a non-governmental organisation bringing together various bodies to promote education in Northern Ghana.
