= List of Ghana governments =

This is a list of the governments of Ghana. Prior to independence, Ghana was under colonial rule in various forms including direct or indirect British rule. On February 12, 1951, the first Ghanaian government or cabinet, dominated by native Ghanaians was formed in the run up to independence on March 6, 1957. since then, Ghana has had a mix of democratically elected governments as well as military ones. It has had a one party state status between 1964 and 1966 while some of the military governments have had extensive civilian involvement such as the Provisional National Defence Council governments.

== Governments of Ghana before independence ==
Party	Leader	Title	Start date	Notes
Committee of Merchants	various	Governor of the Committee of Merchants	23 June 1751	Start date of earliest governor available.
	various	Governor	27 March 1822	
Crown colony under Sierra Leone
	various	Governor	27 March 1843	
Crown colony under direct British rule
	various	Governor	4 March 1874	
Convention People's Party	Dr. Kwame Nkrumah	Leader of Government Business	12 February 1951	Nkrumah was released from prison to head this government

== Governments of Ghana since independence ==
Party	Leader	Title	Start date	Notes
Nkrumah government (Convention People's Party)	Dr. Kwame Nkrumah	Prime Minister	March 6, 1957	UK-style parliamentary government. First government after independence.
First Republic
Nkrumah government (Convention People's Party)	Dr. Kwame Nkrumah	President	1 July 1960	Started as UK-style parliamentary government and ended as one party state between 1964 and 1966.
24 February 1966 coup d'état
National Liberation Council	Joseph Arthur Ankrah; Lt. Gen. A.A. Afrifa	Head of state	24 February 1966; 3 April 1969	First military intervention in government
Second Republic
Busia government (Progress Party)	Dr. Kofi Busia	Prime Minister	1 October 1969	UK-style parliamentary government.
13 January 1972 coup
National Redemption Council; Supreme Military Council	Gen. I.K. Acheampong	Head of state	13 January 1972; 9 October 1975	Gen. Acheampong was removed in a bloodless palace coup.
Supreme Military Council	Lt. Gen. Fred W.K. Akuffo	Head of state	5 July 1978	
4 June 1979 coup
Armed Forces Revolutionary Council	Flt. Lt. Jerry Rawlings	Head of state	4 June 1979	Coup / military revolt by junior ranks of the Ghana Armed Forces after a failed attempt by Rawlings on 15 May 1979
Third Republic
Limann government (People's National Party)	Dr. Hilla Limann	President	24 September 1979	US-style presidential government
31 December 1981 coup
Provisional National Defence Council	Flt. Lt. Jerry Rawlings	Head of state	31 December 1981	Rawlings second coup
Fourth Republic
Rawlings government (National Democratic Congress)	Jerry John Rawlings	President	7 January 1993	Rawlings resigned from the military to stand elections
Kufuor government (New Patriotic Party)	John Agyekum Kufuor	President	7 January 2001	First change of government through elections in Ghana
Mills government (National Democratic Congress)	John Atta Mills	President	7 January 2009	Died in office
Mahama government (National Democratic Congress)	John Mahama	President	24 July 2012	
Akufo-Addo government (New Patriotic Party)	Nana Akufo-Addo	President	7 January 2017	First opposition leader to win election against a sitting president in Ghana History
2nd Mahama government National Democratic Congress	John Mahama	President	7 January 2025	1st person to be elected for two separate terms

== See also ==
- List of Colonial Heads of Ghana
- Heads of state of Ghana
