= Joseph Adjei Buadi =

Ghanaian soldier and politician (1946–2016)

Joseph Adjei Boadi

Provisional National Defence Council member
- In office 31 December 1981 – December 1984
- President: Jerry Rawlings (Head of state)

Personal details
- Born: 1946 Nkawie
- Died: 2016 (aged 69–70)
- Resting place: Kumasi
- Profession: Soldier

Military service
- Allegiance: Ghana
- Branch/service: Ghana Army
- Years of service: 1963 – ?
- Rank: Warrant Officer 1
- Unit: Armed Forces Fire Training School

Joseph Kwame Adjei Buadi ( 1946 – 2016 ) was a Ghanaian soldier and politician. He was one of the original members of the Provisional National Defence Council (PNDC) military government which came to power following the overthrow of the Limann government on 31 December 1981.

Adjei Buadi was born in 1946 at Nkawie in the Ashanti Region. He enlisted in the Ghana Army in 1963. Adjei Buadi was Chief instructor and second-in-command at the Armed Forces Fire Training School prior to becoming a member of the PNDC.

In the PNDC, he was the coordinator for the Armed Forces Defence Committees which had been formed following the 31 December 1981 coup d'état. He testified to the National Reconciliation Commission in March 2003 that he resigned from the PNDC because he was not happy about the killing of the three serving high court judges and the retired army officer by individuals related to the government.

Rawlings described him as a "rare gem who was extremely efficient, highly disciplined soldier and materially incorruptible."

== See also ==
- Provisional National Defence Council
- Joachim Amartey Quaye
