= Ministry of Youth and Sports (Ghana) =

Government ministry of Ghana

Agency overview
- Formed: 1957
- Jurisdiction: Republic of Ghana
- Headquarters: Accra, Ghana
- Minister responsible: Mustapha Ussif
- Website: moys.gov.gh

The Ministry of Sports and Recreation of Ghana is the government agency responsible for youth empowerment, sports development and recreation.

Mandate

Adhering to the provisions outlined in Sections 11 and 13 of the Civil Service Law of 1993 (PNDCL 327), the Ministry of Youth and Sports has been entrusted, under Executive Instrument (EI) 28 of 2017, with the responsibility of instigating and shaping policies related to Youth and Sports. Moreover, the ministry is charged with the task of overseeing the coordination, assessment of operational efficacy, and appraisal of the sector's effectiveness. All these efforts are geared towards the attainment of objectives such as national unity and garnering international acknowledgment.

Mission

The core purpose of the Ministry of Youth and Sports is to offer proficient guidance in the creation, coordination, execution, surveillance, and assessment of policies concerning the development of Youth and Sports. Additionally, the ministry aims to facilitate increased engagement between the public and private sectors, fostering collaboration for both national and international integration.

== Agencies under the Ministry ==
The mandate of the National Sports Authority is to function as an umbrella organization under which various sports associations operate. It was formed in 1976. The Authority develops, organizes and manages competitive and non-competitive sports to promote national cohesion and professionalism in various Ghanaian activities. The National Sports Authority is a government agency established in 1974 to organize and promote youth development programmes in the country. Previously known as National Sports Council.

National Sports Authority

On July 19, 1997, the Ghanaian government introduced the "Sports For All" policy to encourage widespread public involvement in sports, aiming to promote holistic physical, mental, spiritual, social, and cultural development among citizens.

Dr. Honorius Akpeere imported this concept from the Union of Soviet Socialist Republics (USSR) and introduced it to Ghana in 1977. While various sporting disciplines were traditionally managed by Sporting Clubs, Cooperatives, and Trade Unions, the "Sports For All" discipline aimed to engage all segments of society, with a focus on development rather than competitive excellence.

This policy's significance lies in fostering comprehensive development and unity among Ghanaians, transcending physical, mental, spiritual, moral, social, and cultural dimensions. Unlike disciplines striving for Olympic-level excellence, "Sports For All" doesn't emphasize rankings. Instead, it serves as the foundation from which other disciplines evolve into sports aimed at achieving excellence on the Olympic stage and in international championships.

National Youth Authority

Established in 1974 through NRDC 241, the National Youth Authority (NYA) is a Statutory Public Organization tasked with coordinating and facilitating youth empowerment initiatives in Ghana to foster holistic youth development.

Originally known as the National Youth Council (NYC), the Authority underwent transformations. In 1981, it became the "National Youth Organizing Commission" with a focus on creating the "Democratic Youth League of Ghana (DYLG)." Following the advent of constitutional rule in 1992, it reverted to being the "Council."

A statutory law revision under the laws of Ghana (Revised Edition) Act, 1998 (Act 562) resulted in the current name, the "National Youth Authority." Its role is to promote and oversee activities for empowering Ghanaian youth for comprehensive development.

National Sports College

The National Sports College was built in 1984 in Winneba in the Central region. The college was established by the Provisional National Defence Council (PNDC) government to promote various sporting disciplines to international levels. At the college's establishment Ghanaian sportsmen were not performing as expected at international competitions. A reason for the college's establishment was to improve the competitiveness of sportsmen in the country. The function of the college is to train and re-train the country's technical and human resource in various sporting disciplines.

== Events and Activities ==
The ministry is supports the national teams in competitions such as FIFA world cups for all levels and genders and provides support for athletics for major international competitions. The ministry gets support from corporates and individuals in supporting the National teams to represent the country in international competitions.

The ministry was responsible for the hosting of 2023 All African Games. The ministry was responsible to award contracts for the building of sports facilities for the All African Games.

== Management Team ==
- Hon. Mustapha Ussif - Minister
- Hon. Evans Opoku Bobie - DEPUTY MINISTER
- Alhaji Hafiz Adam - CHIEF DIRECTOR
- Mr. Harrison K. Sasu - DIRECTOR, FINANCE AND ADMINISTRATION (F&A)
- Issah Mahami - DIRECTOR, PPBME
- Samuel Korsah - DEPUTY DIRECTOR, RESEARCH, STATISTICS AND INFORMATION MANAGEMENT

== List of ministers ==
Minister	Period
E. R. K. Dwomon	1978 – 1979
Thomas G. Abilla	1979 – 1981
Nii Anyitey Kwakwranya	1981 – 1982
Zaya Yebo	1982 – 1983
Amarkai Amarteifio	1983 – 1986
Ato Austin	1986 – 1988
Kwame Saarah-Mensah	1988 – 1991
Arnold Quainoo	1991 – 1993
E. T. Mensah	24/4/1993 – 6/1/2001
Mallam A.Y Isa	14/2/2001 – 14/3/2001
Papa Owusu-Ankomah	1/8/2001 – 16/10/2001
Edward Osei-Kwaku	13/11/2001 – 17/4/2003
Kwadwo Baah-Wiredu	17/4/2003 – 3/2/2005
Yaw Osafo-Maafo	3/2/2005 – 8/5/2006
Papa Owusu-Ankomah	8/5/2006 – 6/8/2007
Dominic Fobih	6/8/2007 – 6/1/2009
Mubarak Mohammed Muntaka	13/2/2009 – 9/6/2009
Abdul-Rashid Pelpuo	16/7/2009 – 31/8/2009
Abdul-Rashid Pelpuo	1/9/2009 – 25/1/2010
Akua Sena Dansua	11/2/2010 – 4/1/2011
Clement Kofi Humado	14/2/2011 – 31/1/2013
Elvis Afriyie Ankrah	14/2/2013 – 8/7/2014
Mahama Ayariga	8/7/2014 – 14/3/2015
Mustapha Ahmed	14/3/2015 –18/1/2016
Edwin Nii Lante Vanderpuye	19/1/2016 – 6/1/2017
Isaac Kwame Asiamah	02/2017– 6/1/2021
Mustapha Ussif	03/ 2021–2025
Kofi Adams	01/1/2025 – onward
