= Ankrah (surname) =

Ankrah is a surname. Notable people with the surname include:

- Elvis Afriyie Ankrah (born 1967), Ghanaian politician
- Jason Ankrah (born 1991), American football player
- Joseph Arthur Ankrah (1915–1992), Ghanaian soldier
- Roy Ankrah (1925–1995), Ghanaian boxer
- Sam Korankye Ankrah (born 1960), Ghanaian theologian

== See also ==
- Holly Quin-Ankrah (born 1987), British actress
