= Mohammed ben Abdullah =

Mohammed ben Abdullah may refer to:

- Mohammed ben Abdallah (c. 1710 – 1790), Sultan of Morocco from 1757 to 1790
- Muḥammad ibn 'Abdallāh Hassan (1856–1920), emir of the Dervish State
- Mohammed ben Abdallah (1944–2025), Ghanaian playwright
