= Paul Victor Obeng =

Ghanaian politician

Paul Victor Obeng KSG

Chairman of the National Development Planning Commission (NDPC)
- In office 2010–2014
- President: John Evans Atta Mills; John Dramani Mahama
- Succeeded by: Kwesi Botchwey

Chairman of the Committee of Secretaries Provisional National Defence Council
- In office 1982–1992
- President: Jerry John Rawlings; Chairman of the Provisional National Defence Council
- Preceded by: new role
- Succeeded by: dissolved

Personal details
- Born: 19 August 1947
- Died: 17 May 2014 (aged 66) Accra, Ghana
- Party: National Democratic Congress
- Children: 4
- Education: Opoku Ware School; Kwame Nkrumah University of Science and Technology
- Profession: Engineer

Paul Victor Obeng KSG also known as P. V. Obeng (19 August 1947 – 17 May 2014) was a Ghanaian mechanical engineer and politician. He was the chairman of the Kwame Nkrumah University of Science and Technology council. In 2010, he was appointed by the President John Atta Mills administration as Chairman of the National Development Planning Commission (NDPC). Until his death, he was the Senior Presidential Adviser at Presidency to President John Dramani Mahama. He served under President's Jerry John Rawlings, John Evans Atta Mills and John Dramani Mahama in different capacities. He was a member and coordinating secretary and chairman of the Committee of Secretaries of the Provisional National Defence Council. He died on 17 May 2014.

== Early life and education ==
Paul Victor Obeng was born on 19 August 1949 to James Obeng and Mary Obeng. A member of the Akan ethnic group he hailed from the town of Akrokerri in the Adansi North district of the Ashanti Region of Ghana. He started his basic school in his hometown, Akrokerri and later proceeded to Opoku Ware School for his secondary school education. He attended Kwame Nkrumah University of Science and Technology (KNUST) where he graduated with a Bachelor of Science degree in mechanical engineering, first-class Honours. Whilst a student, he was a member of the Katanga Hall, serving as the Hall President at one point in time and subsequently the Students Representative Council President of KNUST in 1972.

== Career ==
Obeng was the chief consultant and Chairman of OB Associates, a public and private sector consulting firm and chairman of Ghana Agro and Food company (GAFCO). In addition, he served as the board director on the Board of Guinness Ghana Limited. He was also the board chairman of the Board of Mining and Building Contractors.

== Politics ==
=== Provisional National Defence Council (PNDC) ===
Obeng got into politics after Jerry John Rawling overthrew the Hilla Limann government in a coup on 31 December 1981. He was member of the 8 core member council of the Provisional National Defence Council. He served as the chairman of the Committee of Secretaries under the Provisional National Defence Council regime (PNDC) from 1982 to 1992. Within this period the public saw him as the de facto Prime Minister and Second-in-Command to Jerry Rawlings.

=== National Democratic Congress (NDC) ===
He was a founding member of the National Democratic Congress in 1992. He served as Presidential Adviser to Jerry John Rawlings on Governmental Affairs under the National Democratic Congress (NDC) from 1992 to 1997. He also served as Chairman of the Ghana Investment Promotion Council (GIPC) from 1992 to 1997. In January 2009, he was appointed by President-elect of John Evans Atta Mills as the Chairman of the 12-member Transitional Team to assist in the transition from the Kufuor Administration to his Government, with Alex Segbefia as Secretary and Hanna Tetteh as Spokesperson.

In January 2010, he was appointed by the President John Atta Mills administration as Chairman of the National Development Planning Commission (NDPC). He served in that capacity until he died and was replaced by former finance Minister Dr Kwesi Botchwey. On 21 January 2013, he was appointed by President Mahama as his Senior Presidential Adviser at the Presidency, a position he held until he died in May 2014.

== Football administration ==
In 2002, Obeng was appointed as the board chairman of the Board of Directors of Kumasi Asante Kotoko S.C. He served in that role from 2002 to 2005. His time as chairman at the club was marked with illustrious silverware for the club as the club won the Ghana Premier League and SWAG Cup twice in 2003 and 2005. Upon him dying, Asante Kotoko rivals Hearts of Oak issued a statement signed by their Board Chairman Togbe Afede XIV conveying their condolences in solidarity that;

"Kumasi Asante Kotoko has indeed lost a gem of a football administrator; Ghana football has lost a towering figure, one of its prized senior citizens"

== Personal life ==
Paul Victor Obeng was married to Rose Obeng and they had four children. He was a Christian and worshipped as a Roman Catholic. After his death, his wife Rose eulogized memory of the late husband and described him as

"a man of many attributes, brilliant, hard-working, selfless, diplomatic, but nevertheless modest".

== Honours and recognition ==
On 7 July 2007, Obeng was honoured with the Order of the Volta (Companion Division) for his service to the development of Ghana by President John Agyekum Kufuor. Other 75 people including Akilakpa Sawyerr were also honoured.

In 2009, Obeng along with Thomas Kwaku Mensah and 27 other people were bestowed with honorary titles of Monsignor and Knighthood by Pope Benedict XVI. He was honoured with Papal Knighthood of St. Gregory the Great Award, which is the 4th highest of the Papal order and Knight awards given out by Catholic Pope. He was knighted for his exceptional contributions in both cash and kind to the growth of the Obuasi Diocese in Ghana since its creation 14 years ago.

We have lost a tireless public servant, an admirable unifier and giant of our political landscape over the past 30-plus years. PV Obeng has been a passionate nationalist and patriot, full of practical ideas, solutions and optimism, for the good of Ghana and Ghanaians. I have leaned on him many times for advice, guidance and support. He was always there to bring his vast experience, institutional knowledge and great connections across many sections of Ghanaian society, to bear on any challenges we have faced.

— John Dramani Mahama, Tribute to P V Obeng

== Death and burial ==
On 17 May 2014, it was reported that Obeng died at the Ledzokuku-Krowor Municipal Assembly (LEKMA) Hospital in Teshie after he collapsed at the Agape Filling Station at Spintex Road in Accra. He was 66. With Obeng being a long-time statesman, he was given a state funeral at the forecourt of the State House in Accra on 15 August 2014.

The funeral was officiated by Archbishop Charles G. Palmer-Buckle and attended by high-profile personalities in the political circles of Ghana, including former President Jerry John Rawlings and his wife, Nana Konadu Agyeman-Rawlings, former President John Agyekum Kufuor; President John Dramni Mahama and his wife Lordina Mahama, Vice President Paa Kwesi Amissah-Arthur, Chief Justice Mrs. Georgina Wood and other politicians, statesmen and diplomats.

He was later buried in his hometown, Akrokerri in the Ashanti Region after state funeral on 16 August 2014.

== Legacy and memorial ==
=== PV Obeng Avenue and roundabout ===
In August 2015, also being the birth month of Obeng, the Tema Metropolitan Assembly (TMA) named and unveiled a road and roundabout at Tema within the Tema Community Three area around CMB Quarters zone to P. V. Obeng Avenue and P. V. Obeng Roundabout respectively, after him to eulogise his memories and recognise his contributions to the development of the country and Tema Metropolitan area where he resided. The announcement and unveiling was by Metropolitan Chief Executive of Tema, Isaac Ashai Odamtten at a function organised by the TMA and the Greater Accra coordinating branch.

=== Memorial lectures ===
In August 2015, the first Paul Victor Obeng Memorial lectures was organized by the Kwame Nkrumah University of Science and Technology (KNUST) Alumni Association, Tema Chapter in memory of him. Kwame Saarah-Mensah former Minister of Youth and Sports in the PNDC era was the Keynote speaker and William Otoo Ellis, then Vice Chancellor of KNUST was the chairman. The theme of the lecture was The Man P. V. Obeng. In 2016, the second memorial lecture was organised with Rev. Charles G. Palmer-Buckle being the keynote speaker Since his death in 2014, people in and outside the political scene in Ghana who looked up to him continue to write and show their admiration for his tolerance and leadership skills.

== See also ==
- Provisional National Defence Council regime (PNDC)
- National Development Planning Commission (NDPC)
