= Sharon Scranage espionage scandal =

1985 CIA espionage scandal

The Sharon Scranage espionage scandal involved the passing of classified information from Sharon Scranage, a clerk with the Central Intelligence Agency, to Michael Soussoudis, an intelligence officer with the Ghanaian Provisional National Defence Council.

== Sharon Scranage ==
Sharon Marie Scranage was born October 1955. In May 1976, Scranage joined the CIA as a clerk-stenographer.

== Michael Soussoudis ==
Michael Agbotui Soussoudis was born in April 1946 in Accra, Ghana. His father was Greek and his mother was French-Ghanaian. He identified with Ghanaian nationalism. He was brought up in West Germany and went to college in New York City. There he married an American woman. They divorced before he graduated.

He returned to Ghana as an adult after college, and he was described as leading a "playboy lifestyle". Due to his partying and friendship with American women, he was described as "more American than African." As an adult, he was described as a handsome, debonair character. Likely in part because of his familiarity with the US and Germany, and fluency in their languages, he was recruited into the Ghanaian intelligence service.

Although he had returned to Ghana, he had earlier permanent residence status in the United States.

== Scranage's involvement with Soussoudis ==
Soussoudis formed a romantic relationship with CIA employee Sharon Scranage in Ghana sometime between May 27, 1983, and October 1984. He eventually persuaded her to provide confidential US information to him. The affair reportedly lasted 18 months. She later claimed that she had informed the CIA station chief in Ghana of the relationship and was told only to "be careful." Soussoudis had been assigned to seduce Scranage and solicit US intelligence from her.

Scranage was then working in Ghana as an operations support assistant. Soussoudis obtained from her the identities of Ghanaian citizens who were spying for the CIA, as well as plans by dissidents for a coup against the Ghanaian government. Soussoudis passed the information to Ghanaian intelligence chief Kojo Tsikata.

In 1983 an Office of Security officer was at Scranage's home for dinner and noticed a picture of a man, later identified as Soussoudis, on her dressing table. The photo showed a shirtless Soussoudis with blankets pulled up to his chest.

== Investigation and prosecution of Scranage and Soussoudis ==
Upon Scranage's return to the U.S. in 1985, she failed a routine polygraph test related to her relationship with Soussoudis. During further questioning, CIA agents discovered the extent of the information she had given to Soussoudis. Authorities claimed that Scranage had given him "sensitive documents and the names of virtually everyone working for the C.I.A. in the country". After an FBI investigation, Scranage cooperated with the authorities, and assisted in the arrest of Soussoudis. Scranage contacted Soussoudis and asked to meet at a motel in northern Virginia. Soussoudis was arrested there on July 10, 1985 and charged with eight counts of espionage. Scranage was arrested the next day.

During a closed court hearing, Soussoudis was sentenced to 20 years in prison, but he was eventually traded in exchange for eight of the agents whose identities he had helped compromise in Ghana. Soussoudis was later released on the condition that he quickly leave the United States, and in exchange for the Ghanaians arrested as CIA spies, who were deported to the United States and stripped of their Ghanaian citizenship. On December 3, 1985, he returned to Ghana and was greeted by thousands of cheering citizens.

Scranage was eventually charged with espionage and with breaching the Intelligence Identities Protection Act. She pleaded guilty to three of the eighteen charges against her, with the others being dropped. Late in 1985, she was sentenced to five years in prison, later reduced to two years. She ultimately served eight months of the original five-year sentence.

== Fallout and consequences ==
Soussoudis is an example of an agent working as a successful honey trap to gain classified information from another party.

The information Soussoudis obtained from Sharon Scranage had led to the arrest of eight Ghanaian citizens who had been spying for the CIA. They received sentences ranging from 25 years in prison with hard labor to life imprisonment. The US government believed that another CIA informant in Ghana who had been exposed was killed.

The intelligence also uncovered a planned coup by Godfrey Osei, of which there are allegations that the CIA supported. The coup was allegedly already in motion with a boat carrying six tons of heavy weapons when the crew rebelled. That led to the boat of arms and mercenaries returning to Brazil and the mercenaries being arrested, and later breaking out of prison and making their way back to the United States. Among the eight arrested in Ghana included Naval Captain Oppong, Colonel Bray, Abel Edusei, Adu Gyamfi, and Major John Kwaku Awuakye. They constituted some of the most high-ranking informants that the CIA had in the government of Jerry Rawlings. These eight CIA spies were stripped of their Ghanaian citizenship before being deported to the United States, and being relocated in the Virginia, D.C., area. According to FBI affidavits and CIA intelligence declassified in 2011, Ghanaian intelligence chief Kojo Tsikata passed intelligence provided by Scranage to Cuba, Libya, and East Germany.

== See also ==
- John Kiriakou, another former CIA employee later charged under the 1982 Intelligence Identities Protection Act
