= Joseph W.S. de Graft-Johnson =

Ghanaian engineer, academic and politician (1933–1999)

Joseph de Graft-Johnson
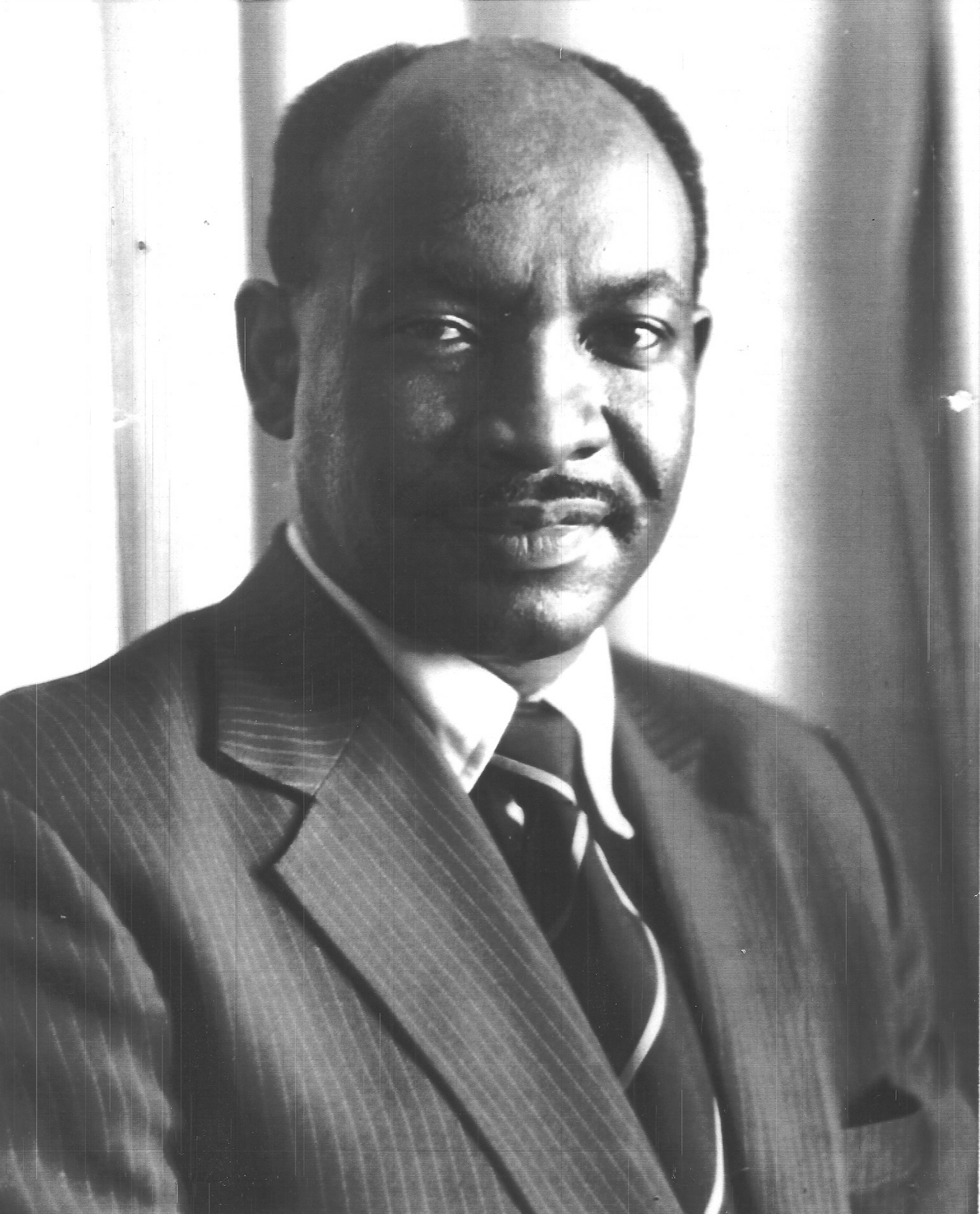

1st Vice President of Ghana (3rd Republic)
- In office 24 September 1979 – 31 December 1981
- President: Hilla Limann
- Preceded by: New position
- Succeeded by: Kow Nkensen Arkaah

Personal details
- Born: 6 October 1933 Cape Coast, Gold Coast
- Died: 22 April 1999 (aged 65) London, England
- Party: People's National Party
- Spouse: Lily Anna de Graft-Johnson (née Sekyi)
- Children: 5
- Education: Mfantsipim School; University of Leeds (BSc); University of Birmingham (MSc); University of California, Berkeley (PhD)
- Profession: Engineer; Academic

Joseph William Swain de Graft-Johnson (6 October 1933 – 22 April 1999) was a Ghanaian engineer, academic and politician. He served as Vice-President of Ghana from 1979 to 1981.

== Early life and education ==
Joseph de Graft-Johnson was born on 6 October 1933 in Cape Coast, Gold Coast to Fante parents. He attended Mfantsipim School. He received his bachelor's degree in Civil Engineering from the University of Leeds. In 1960, he received a master's degree in Highway Engineering from the University of Birmingham. He received his PhD in Soil Mechanics from the University of California, Berkeley in 1965.

== Career ==
He first worked with a London engineering firm, where his projects included the building of a Brazilian power plant and the extension of an airport in London. de Graft-Johnson practised as an engineer in Ghana. He was a lecturer at the Kwame Nkrumah University of Science and Technology at Kumasi and was later promoted to Senior Lecturer, then associate professor in 1968. In 1969, he became the Director of the Buildings and Roads Research Institute. In 1974, he was one of ten members appointed to the Ghana Highways Authority and later, sat on the board of directors. He was also one of the founding members of the Ghana Institution of Engineers (GhIE), of which he was the President from 1977 to 1978. He was a consultant to the Government of Zambia where he advised on the set-up of the Building Research and Development Institute in Lusaka.

== Politics ==
During the era of military rule under the Supreme Military Council, he was involved in opposition to continued military rule as he was then President of the GhIE, one of many professional bodies in Ghana opposing the military government. He suffered personal attacks because of this. He was a member of the 1978 Constituent Assembly established to write the 1979 Constitution of the Third Republic. de Graft-Johnson joined the People's National Party (PNP) when it was founded in 1979. This was after the ban on political parties imposed in 1972 by the National Redemption Council was lifted. The PNP won the elections and he became the first ever Vice President of Ghana in the Limann government. The government was overthrown by coup d'état on 31 December 1981. He left for exile in London, England after the coup.

== Personal life ==
He was married to Lily Anna Sekyi and they had 5 children.

== Death ==
De Graft-Johnson died on 22 April 1999 in London at the age of 65. After his funeral service at the Wesley Methodist Cathedral, he was buried in Cape Coast.

== Publications ==
- De Graft-Johnson, J. W. S.; Harbhajan Bhatia; A. A. Hammond (November 1972). "Lateritic Gravel Evaluation for Road Construction". Journal of the Soil Mechanics and Foundations Division. 98 (11): 1245–1265. doi:10.1061/JSFEAQ.0001806. Archived from the original on 21 May 2005.

== Literature ==
- de Graft Okyere, Letitia (2022) The First Vice President: A Biography of JWS de Graft-Johnson MacSwain Publishing

Political offices
New title	Vice-President of Ghana; 1979–81	Succeeded by Kow Nkensen Arkaah (1993–97)
