= Daniel Alolga Akata Pore =

Secretary, Armed Force Defense Committees
- In office 11 January 1982 – 23 November 1982
- President: Jerry Rawlings

Personal details
- Born: Ghana
- Profession: Soldier

Military service
- Allegiance: Ghana
- Branch/service: Ghana Army
- Rank: Sergeant

Daniel Alolga Akata Pore is a Ghanaian politician and former soldier. He was a member of the Provisional National Defence Council which ruled Ghana following the military coup d'état on 31 December 1981.

He was arrested along with others including Tata Ofosu, editor of the June Four Movement's paper The Workers’ Banner and Kwame Pianim on 23 November 1982 following the capture of part of Gondar Barracks, Burma Camp in an apparent abortive coup attempt. He remained in custody until 19 June 1983, when he among with others escaped from custody during another coup attempt led by Sergeant Abdul Malik and Corporal Carlos Halidu Giwa.

He went into exile in London, United Kingdom, following his escape.

== See also ==
- Provisional National Defence Council
- Joachim Amartey Quaye
