= National Sports College, Winneba =

Sports college in Ghana

National Sports College Winneba is an educational institution for sports in Ghana. It is located at Winneba in the Central Region of Ghana.

== History ==
The National Sports College Winneba was established in 1984 by the 1976 SMC Decree number 54, and amended by the PNDC Law.

== Purpose ==
The purpose of the college is to improve the capacity of the technical human resource through trainings, and retraining, embark on sports related research, organize workshops, make available facilities for camping for Ghanaian local and national teams, and also identify potential talents in sport.
