= Mary Grant (politician) =

Ghanaian politician and physician

Council of State Member

Minister of Education and Culture
- In office 1991–1993

Member of National Defence Council for General Affairs
- In office 1989–2001

Deputy Minister of Health
- In office 1988–1989

Personal details
- Born: 6 August 1928
- Died: 18 September 2016 (aged 88) 37 Military Hospital, Accra, Ghana
- Education: Wesley Girls High School

Mary Grant (6 August 1928 – 18 September 2016) was a Ghanaian physician and politician. She was Ghana's first Council of State member and also the first Wesley Girls High School alumna to be a medical doctor. Grant was the third Ghanaian woman to qualify in medicine after Susan Ofori-Atta (1947) and Matilda J. Clerk (1949). She was a relation of Paa Grant, who has been called "the father of Gold Coast politics".

== Education ==
Mary Grant had her basic education at Obuasi Methodist School. She had her secondary education from the Wesley Girls High School in Cape Coast, and went on to become the school's first alumna to qualify as a medical doctor after completing her training in the United Kingdom.

== Career ==
After working in the government health service as a medical officer, Mary Grant began her political career when she was appointed Secretary of Health in 1985. Grant held many positions, including Deputy Minister of Health and Member of the Provisional National Defense Council (PNDC). She later became the Minister of Education and Culture and also a Member of Council of State.

She led Ghana's delegation to many international conferences, including World Health Organisation (WHO) General Assemblies in Geneva and Regional Conferences in Africa, World Bank Meeting in Africa Health, Cairo Conference on Population and Development, and she was among Ghana's delegation to the World Conference on Women held in Beijing in 1995.

== Awards and honours ==
Grant received an award during the Maiden Women's Award ceremony. At its 39th Annual General Conference in 1997, the Ghana Medical Association awarded her a Certificate of Honour in appreciation of "her concern for the welfare of doctors." In the same year, she received a State Award for her “wise and forthright counsel as a member of the Council of State”.

== Death and state funeral ==
She died aged 88, on the afternoon of 18 September 2016 at the 37 Military Hospital in Accra, and was given a state funeral.
