= National Development Planning Commission =

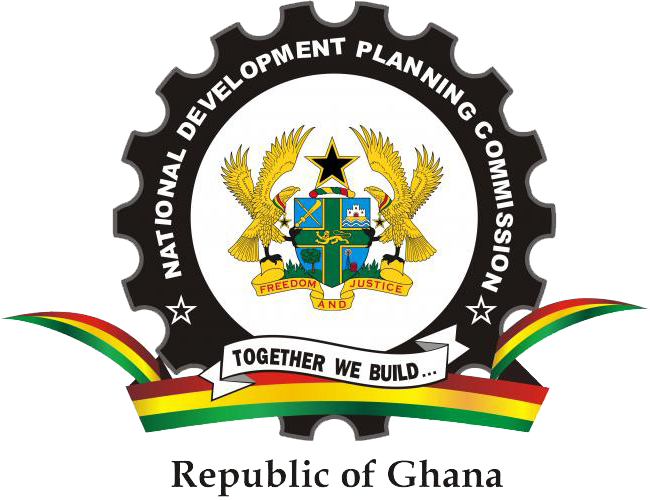

Agency overview
- Formed: 1993; 33 years ago
- Jurisdiction: Government of Ghana
- Headquarters: 13 Switchback Rd, Accra
- Agency executives: Professor Stephen Adei, Chairman; Kodjo Esseim Mensah-Abrampa, Director General
- Website: ndpc.gov.gh

The National Development Planning Commission is a Ghanaian state agency committed to eradicating poverty and reducing inequalities in deprived areas and rural communities. The commission was established in 1992.

== History ==
The establishment of a National Development Commission was first proposed under the 1979 constitution. According to the constitution, the commission was to be chaired by the then vice president who was to report to the then president. The role of the chairman of the Commission according to the constitution was to advise, monitor and evaluate. The commission's existence was precluded by the 1981 coup.

In view of Ghana's attempt to improve decentralization in the 1980s, the government employed the services of a Hungarian team of consultants (TESCO), sponsored by the United Nations Development Programme (UNDP). The team was to study the nation and propose a structure of development planning based on grassroots participation. In March 1987, the resulting proposal from the team was considered and based on this proposal, they decided to establish a development planning agency that was to be independent of the Ministry of Finance and Economic Planning.

The National Development Planning Commission was established, and a preparatory committee by the name Transitional Implementation Team (TIT) was created to put together a detailed proposal on how the commission should be organized and structured. The team also prepared an operating manual and a draft, National Development Planning Law, which was going to be the commission's legal basis.

Following the creation of the National Development Planning Law, the drafted legal document was revised a number of times until 1989 when it was accepted. The government in early 1990 begun to implement the recommendations of the Transitional Implementation Team (TIT), and the preparatory committee by (PREPCOM) for the establishment of the National Development Planning Commission was established. The committee was chaired by Lieutenant-General Arnold Quainoo, then member of the PNDC government, and the committee began operations on 2 April 1990.

In 1993 when Ghana transitioned from military rule to civilian rule, the legitimacy of the committee was backed by article 86 of the 1992 constitution. The establishment of the committee was formalised by article 87, which described and explained the functions of the commission, including its mandate to "advise the president on development planning policy and strategy".

Lieutenant-Colonel Mensah K. Gbedemah who had served as the preparatory commission's secretary from February 1991 to June 1994, was later appointed technical head of the National Development Planning Commission (NDPC). He was replaced by Dr. Kobena G. Erbynn who served from June 1994 to February 1995.

In accordance to the 1992 constitution, the National Development Planning Commission (NDPC) act, act 479, was promulgated in September 1994. Based on the act, a governing board for the commission was set up in February 1995. The first group of members of the commission were sworn in by the then president, Jerry John Rawlings at the Osu Castle (the then residence of the president of Ghana) on 15 June 1995.

Some of the then leading members of the commission included, P. V. Obeng (Presidential Advisor on Government Affairs) who was then vice-chairman; Dr. Kobena G. Erbynn, then acting Director-General of the NDPC, and Lieutenant-General Arnold Quainoo, who continued to serve on the commission.

== Mandate ==
The NDPC, as a Ghanaian state agency, was established solely to work closely with every President of the Fourth republic of Ghana. The commission is mandated to make provisions for coordinated program of Economic and Social Development policies, which the President of Ghana under the constitution is required to submit to parliament within two years.

The NDPC was set up under Articles 86 and 87 of the 1992 constitution of Ghana. Article 86 of the constitution stipulates the composition of the commission whereas Article 87 outlines the functions of the commission. The National Development Planning Act, 1994, (Act 479), formally establishes the NDPC under the office of the President. And the National Development Planning (System), Act, 1994, (Act 480) makes NDPC the national coordinating body of the newly established Decentralized Development Planning System in Ghana. These provisions lay out the core legal framework of the commission. To promote sustainable and stable development to eliminate poverty, reduce inequalities in deprived areas and improve people's quality of life.

== Laws and Functions ==
Laws relevant to the functions of the commission are Local Government Act (Act 462) 1993; Local Government Service Act (Act 656) 2003; Petroleum Revenue Act (Act 815) 2011; Civil Service Act (PNDC Law 327) 1993; and Ghana Infrastructure Investment Fund Act, (Act 877) 2014.

The major function of the NDPC is to advise the President on economic development. As part of its functions to produce a National Development Plan, the commission initiated the process of producing Vision 2020, a 25-year development plan. Vision 2020: The First Step (1996-2000) covered the initial part of the plan. The commission also led in creating other medium-term plans such as Ghana Poverty Reduction Strategy (2003-2005); Growth and Poverty Reduction Strategy (2006-2009); Ghana shared Growth and Development Agenda (2010-2013), and Ghana Shared Growth and Development Agenda (2014-2017).

Per the constitution of Ghana, the commission is expected to perform these functions:

1. "The Commission shall advise the President on development planning policy and strategy."
2. "The Commission shall, at the request of the President or Parliament, or on its own initiative- (a) study and make strategic analyses of macro-economic and structural reform options; (b) make proposals for the development of multi-year rolling plans taking into consideration the resource potential and comparative advantage of the different districts in Ghana; (c) make proposals for the protection of the natural and physical environment; (d) make proposals for ensuring the even development of the districts of Ghana by the effective utilization of available resources; and (e) monitor, evaluate and co-ordinate development policies, programs and projects."
3. "The commission shall also perform such other functions relating to development planning as the President may direct."

== Strategic Divisions ==
=== General Services ===
The General Services (GS) Division is responsible for providing the administrative and support services required to facilitate the effective operations of the Commission’s four (4) technical Divisions and to help achieve its overall objectives. The Division consists of three main departments: Human Resources, Administration, and Finance & Accounts.

In line with the broader objectives of the Commission, the GS Division performs several key functions. These include preparing the annual report of the National Development Planning Commission (NDPC) and promoting the prudent and efficient use of resources through the effective implementation and monitoring of financial and administrative policies, regulations, internal control systems, and guidelines.

The Division also develops and implements appropriate systems, policies, and procedures to ensure the proper recording, preparation, and monitoring of administrative, financial, and human resource activities, annual budgets, and other relevant reports.

The major outputs of the Division include the NDPC annual report, procurement plan, training needs analysis report, succession plan, and various financial reports.

=== Monitoring and Evaluation ===
The Monitoring and Evaluation (M&E) Division is responsible for monitoring and assessing the implementation of development plans, policies, programmes, and projects. The Division also serves as a repository for selected development data collected from Ministries, Departments and Agencies (MDAs) and Metropolitan, Municipal and District Assemblies (MMDAs).

The Division performs several important functions, including developing guidelines and supporting the preparation of sectoral and district-level M&E plans. It is also responsible for preparing the National Annual Progress Report (APR), which provides an assessment of the progress made in implementing national development plans.

The M&E Division ensures that national development plans are regularly reviewed and updated to reflect changing domestic and international development conditions. Where necessary, the Division makes recommendations for the revision of existing policies and programmes to improve their effectiveness.

Another key responsibility of the Division is the management of the National Monitoring and Evaluation Information System (NaMEIS). This system serves as a database for key development indicators used to track development at the national, sectoral, regional, and district levels.

The major deliverables of the Division include the M&E Guidelines and the National Annual Progress Report (APR).

=== Development Policy ===
The Development Policy (DP) Division is responsible for formulating long-term and medium-term development policy frameworks that provide direction for national and sub-national development.

The Division performs several key functions, including making proposals to protect Ghana’s natural and built environments in accordance with sound environmental principles. It also works to promote balanced and equitable development across all districts of Ghana.

The DP Division collaborates with other technical divisions of the Commission, the Policy Coordination, Monitoring and Evaluation Unit (PCMEU) of the Office of the President, and other relevant stakeholders to identify critical national development issues and opportunities.

The Division also assesses various policy options and priorities and works closely with national and sub-national institutions to develop, review, and update comprehensive development policies and plans at the national, sectoral, regional, and district levels.

In addition, the Division collaborates with other divisions of the NDPC and the Budget Division of the Ministry of Finance during policy hearings. It also contributes to the dissemination of research findings that are of public interest.

The major outputs of the DP Division include the Medium-Term National Development Policy Framework (MTNDPF), Long-Term National Development Framework (LTNDF), and the Long-Term Ghana Infrastructure Plan (GIP).

=== Research ===
the Research Division is responsible for conducting research on various national policy issues and serves as a central source of knowledge to support learning, planning, policymaking, and the needs of other organizations.

The Division undertakes the continuous development of new initiatives to improve development planning and policymaking. It also conducts comprehensive research and studies that examine and integrate the economic, social, environmental, and spatial dimensions of development. These studies support the preparation, review, and updating of long-term perspective plans, medium-term development plans, and annual action plans.

The Research Division also develops policy recommendations on emerging national and international development issues. In addition, it initiates research proposals in collaboration with other technical divisions of the Commission, academic institutions, research organizations, and think tanks.

The Division publishes and disseminates the National Development Monitor (NDM), along with other research findings, studies, and reports.

=== Development Plan Coordination ===
The Development Plan Coordination (DPC) Division provides and coordinates the necessary support for policy formulation, development planning, monitoring, evaluation, and research at both national and sub-national levels.

The Division serves as a central coordinating point for the activities of the Commission and promotes effective collaboration with key stakeholders. It is also responsible for developing and distributing planning guidelines to support the preparation of sectoral, district, and regional integrated development plans.

The DPC Division ensures that comprehensive development plans and programmes are effectively implemented by coordinating and integrating planning and development activities at the national and sub-national levels. This helps to minimize duplication and promote efficient use of resources.

The Division is also responsible for reviewing, approving, and certifying the Medium-Term Development Plans of Ministries, Departments and Agencies (MDAs) and Metropolitan, Municipal and District Assemblies (MMDAs).

In addition, the Division develops the strategic planning component of the Medium-Term Expenditure Framework (MTEF), which supports the budgeting process and fiscal decentralization. It also works closely with the Ministry of Finance in preparing the national budget and organizing annual policy hearings. These activities help ensure that the budgets of Ministries, Departments, and Agencies are aligned with the Commission’s approved development plans and national development priorities.

The major outputs of the DPC Division include Planning Guidelines, the Medium-Term National Development Plan (MTNDP), and Medium-Term Development Plan approval certificates.
