= Mohammed ben Abdallah (playwright) =

Ghanaian writer (1944–2025)

- Born: 25 April 1944; Kumasi, Gold Coast
- Died: 18 September 2025 (aged 81); Accra, Ghana
- Education: University of Ghana (BA); University of Georgia (MFA); University of Texas (PhD)
- Notable work: The Slaves; The Fall of Kumbi; The Alien King

Mohammed ben Abdallah (25 April 1944 – 18 September 2025) was a Ghanaian playwright, theatre director, educator, and politician. A member of the Legon 7, he founded Legon Road Theatre and later established Abibigromma, initially a resident troupe at the university that was subsequently relocated to the National Theatre in Accra, which was established in the 1980s in part through his initiative. In 1990, he oversaw the establishment of the National Commission on Culture. He also served as Secretary for Education and Culture under the PNDC and later headed the University of Ghana's School of Performing Arts.

Referred to as "the major Ghanaian playwright of his generation." Abdallah's work, often pan-African in scope and attentive to histories such as the transatlantic slave trade, was grounded in indigenous performance. His stage works include The Slaves (1972), The Trial of Malam Ilya, The Verdict of the Cobra, and The Alien King (all 1987); The Fall of Kumbi and The Witch of Mopti (all 1989); Land of a Million Magicians (1993); and Song of the Pharaoh (2022), as well as the children’s plays Ananse and the Rain God (1989) and Ananse and the Golden Drum (1994).

== Early life and education ==
Mohammed ben Abdallah was born on 25 April 1944 in Kumasi. After secondary school in Accra, Abdallah trained as a teacher at Wesley College of Education in Kumasi. While there he staged productions that impressed the headmaster of Prempeh College, who offered him a post upon his receiving a Teacher's Certificate. After two years and several Shakespeare productions at Prempeh, he returned to study at the School of Music and Drama attached to the Institute of African Studies at Legon, which offered a diploma in Theatre Studies. Finding the school insufficient for his creative aims, he formed a troupe that toured an abridged Macbeth to secondary schools, seeking to build a company and circuit beyond his student years. From 1969 to 1970 he worked closely with the Legon 7, a student drama group that grew from mime and improvisation sessions and became the only operative drama group on campus. Its first production, A Selection of the Verse, Prose and Drama of Wole Soyinka as Presented by the Inmates of the Federal State Prison at Cotonou under the Direction of Prisoner Jaguna, drew controversy, and its next play, Frimpong and Lucy, a local adaptation of Henry Medwall's Fulgens and Lucrece, was staged in Accra, Kumasi, and at Legon with financial success. Abdallah joined the group at the start of its second year and expanded its activities, including publishing critical broadsheets on campus.

Abdallah later studied in the United States, receiving an MFA in Theatre Arts from the University of Georgia in 1976 and a PhD in Theatre Arts from the University of Texas at Austin in 1980.

== Career ==
Abdallah's theatrical career was shaped by his membership in the Legon 7 at the University of Ghana School of Music and Drama. AHe went on to found the Legon Road Theatre, providing a platform for experimental performance in a cultural landscape then dominated by Shakespearean productions. He later established Abibigromma, initially a resident troupe of the University of Ghana and subsequently relocated to the National Theatre in Accra, which was constructed in the 1980s in part through his initiative.

Abdallah was regarded as one of the leading dramatists of his country and generation, and was described as "a maestro in theatre arts and cultural renaissance." His work, unlike that of earlier Ghanaian dramatists, has been described as transcending ethnic and national boundaries to dramatize the wider histories of Ghana and Africa. He challenged the omission of the transatlantic slave trade from Ghanaian curricula, which emphasized the power of West African empires such as Asante, Mande, Yoruba, and Dahomey, while minimizing their role in the trade. Abdallah also promoted the development of an "authentic African theatre," conceived as a pan-African aesthetic grounded in indigenous traditions and culture, comparable to the work of Ghanaian dramatists such as Efua Sutherland, Asiedu Yirenkyi, Joe de Graft, and Ama Ata Aidoo. According to Jesse Weaver Shipley, Abdallah codified "the improvisational aspects of storytelling and popular theatre traditions through spatial ordering, narration techniques, and embedding multiple genres in a performance," thereby creating "theatrical time-space shaped around a storytelling idiom" and reflecting "debates about historical time."

His stage works include his 1972 play The Slaves, which was the first non-American play to win the Randolph Edmunds Award of the National Association for Speech and Dramatic Arts, as well as The Trial of Malam Ilya and Other Plays, The Verdict of the Cobra, and The Alien King (all 1987), The Fall of Kumbi, and The Witch of Mopti (all 1989); Land of a Million Magicians (1993); and Song of the Pharaoh (2022). He also wrote two children's plays, Ananse and the Rain God (1989) and Ananse and the Golden Drum (1994). In The Slaves and The Slaves Revisited, he explores the historical connections between Europe, Africa, and the Americas. In the preface to The Trial of Mallam Ilya and Other Plays, Abdallah wrote that the collection "represents both my development as a playwright in philosophy, technique, and style; and influences that shaped and directed the course of this development."

As successor to Asiedu Yirenkyi at the Ministry of Culture, Abdallah advanced the government's plan for a National Theatre. In 1985, under his tenure, Ghana signed a cooperation agreement with China to construct the National Theatre Complex on the site of the Ghana Experimental Drama Studio, with a replica of the studio to be built elsewhere. He oversaw construction, established the organisational framework, and secured resident companies (the National Drama Company, National Dance Company, and National Symphony Orchestra). In 1990, the National Commission on Culture was established under the leadership of Abdallah. He also served as Head of the School of Performing Arts at the University of Ghana.

Abdallah also worked as a World Bank consultant to the Gambian government, assisting with capacity-building programmes for the National Council for Arts and Culture. He also held political office under the Provisional National Defence Council (PNDC), serving as Secretary for Education and Culture in the 1980s and 1990s.

== Personal life ==
Abdallah was husband to Cecelia Akosua Amponsah and was father to 5 children : Akosua Abdallah, Farouk Abdallah, Rameses Abdallah, Amina Abdallah and Pomaa Bamfo.

== Death ==
Abdallah died in Accra, Ghana on 18 September 2025, at the age of 81.

== Selected works ==
- The Slaves (1972)
- The Trial of Malam Ilya (1987)
- The Verdict of the Cobra (1987)
- The Alien King (1987)
- The Slaves Revisited (1989)
- The Fall of Kumbi (1989)
- The Witch of Mopti (1989)
- Ananse and the Rain God (1989)
- Land of a Million Magicians (1993)
- Ananse and the Golden Drum (1994)
- Song of the Pharaoh (2022)
