= Mawuse Dake =

Ghanaian politician and academic

J. Mawuse Dake
- Mawuse Ðake

Secretary for Works and Housing
- In office January 1982 – 1983
- President: Jerry Rawlings
- Preceded by: David Zanlerigu
- Succeeded by: Kofi Sam

Personal details
- Died: 13 April 2000 (age 63 years)
- Citizenship: Ghanaian
- Party: Convention People's Party
- Other political affiliations: Social Democratic Front
- Occupation: lecturer

Mawuse Dake was a Ghanaian politician and academic.

== Politics ==
Dake was the running mate for the presidential bid of Ibrahim Mahama for the Social Democratic Front in the 1979 Ghanaian general election. They won 3.72% of the vote, coming fifth.

He left for Kenya where he worked as a consultant for some years.

Following the coup d'état on 31 December 1981, Dake was appointed Secretary for Works and Housing in the Provisional National Defence Council military government led by Jerry Rawlings. In 1983, he was made the Secretary to the National Defence Committee.

In 1992, when the ban on party politics was lifted, he became one of the founding members of the People's Heritage Party (PHP) whose leader was Emmanuel Erskine. He is reported to have been influential in the merger between the PHP and the National Independence Party (NIP) led by Kwabena Darko to form the People's Convention Party (PCP). He is reported to have been against the alliance formed between the New Patriotic Party and the PCP called the Great Alliance to fight the 1996 Ghanaian general election. He is also reported to have been influential in the PCP and the National Convention Party (NCP) merging to reform the Convention People's Party.

== Sports ==
Dake was keen on football and was Chairman of Voradep Football Club as well as a Director of Accra Great Olympics F.C.

== Publications ==
- Dake, J. Mawuse (1994). Lamentations of a Patriot: A Political Indictment of J.J. Concerned Citizens Platform for The Conscience of the Nation.
