= Aanaa Enin =

Ghanaian politician and diplomat

Aanaa Naamua Enin

Member of the Provisional National Defence Council
- In office 1983–1989
- President: Jerry Rawlings

Ghana Ambassador to Holland
- President: John Atta Mills

Personal details
- Party: National Democratic Congress

Aanaa Naamua Enin is a Ghanaian politician and diplomat. She was a member of the Provisional National Defence Council (PNDC) military government of Ghana. She has also served as Ghana's ambassador to the Netherlands.

== Politics ==
Aanaa Enin was made a member of the military PNDC government in 1983. The PNDC was formed following the overthrow of the Limann government in December 1981 by a military coup d'état led by Jerry Rawlings who became the Head of state of Ghana. She served in this capacity until 1989. In 2019, she was appointed to the Complaints Committee of the NDC.

== Diplomatic service ==
Enin served as Ghana's ambassador to the Netherlands during the rule of John Evans Atta Mills of the National Democratic Congress (NDC) from 2010 to about 2012.

Diplomatic posts
Preceded by ?	Ghana's Ambassador to the Netherlands ? – ?	Succeeded by ?
