= Stephen Adei =

Ghanaian academic

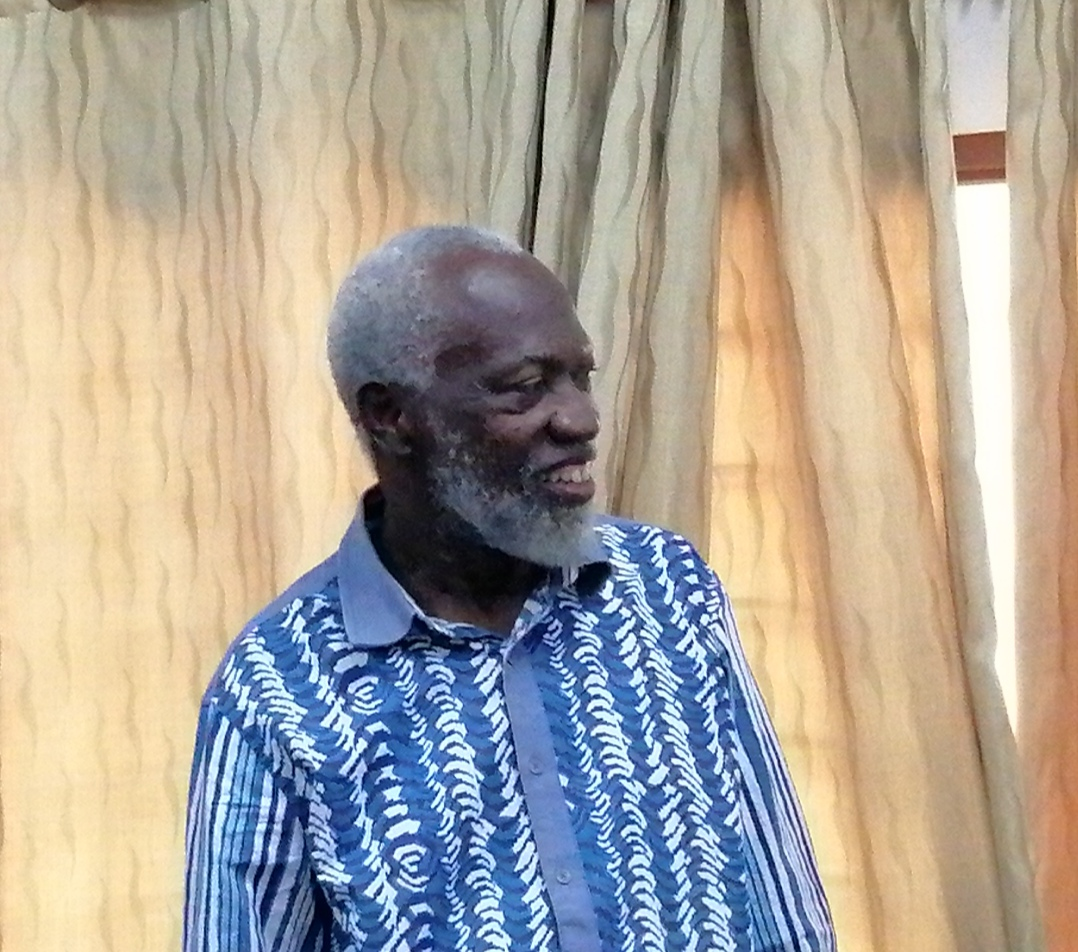

7th Rector of the Ghana Institute of Management and Public Administration
- In office 1999–2008
- Preceded by: T. B. Wereko
- Succeeded by: Yaw Agyemang Badu

Personal details
- Born: 14 December 1948 (age 77) Hwiremuasi
- Spouse: Georgina Adei

Stephen Adei (born 14 December 1948) is a Ghanaian economist, administrator and writer who is a former Director General and Rector of the Ghana Institute of Management and Public Administration. He is a former chairperson of the National Development Planning Commission (NDPC) under the Nana Akufo-Addo government.

== Early life and education ==
He was born in the village of Hwiremoase, in Adansi, Ashanti, Ghana to Kwaku Adei and Abena Pomaa (aka Bedito). Adei attended primary school in the village's Methodist Primary school and nearby United Middle School in Brofuyedru.

He is the fourth child of his mother's seven surviving all male children. From basic school education, he obtained a four year Teacher's Certificate in 1964 from the Sefwi Wiawso Training College.

He studied privately to gain London University Ordinary and Advanced Level General Certificates in Education (High School equivalent qualifications) in three and a half years. Adei proceeded to the University of Ghana in October 1968 where he read economics, Sociology and Geography obtaining honours in all three first-year subjects before going on to do a BSc Honours programme in Economics. He then went to Strathclyde for his master's degree in Development Economics. He also holds a PhD in International Economics at the University of Sydney.

== Career ==
Stephen Adei was the Director General and the Rector of the Ghana Institute of Management and Public Administration (GIMPA) between January, 2000 and December 2008. Under his leadership, GIMPA was transformed from a small, under-resourced and subverted Institute in 1999 to the most successful organization under the Government of Ghana’s Public Sector reform.

He was the Senior Economist of the Commonwealth Secretariat, London (1986-1989). He also serves as the board chairman of the Ghana Revenue Authority having been sworn in by the Finance Minister of Ghana; Ken Ofori-Atta.

On 18 August 2023, he resigned from the advisory board of the finance ministry.

== Awards ==
- Order of the Volta Companion of Ghana
- Leadership Excellence Award
- Fellow and Patron of the Chartered Institute of Marketing (FCIMG)
- Doctor of Letters from GIMPA
