= Zonke Majodina =

South African academic, clinical psychologist and human rights worker

Member of the United Nations Human Rights Committee
- In office 2013–2021

Personal details
- Born: 13 September 1944 Cape Town
- Died: 10 July 2022 (aged 77) Johannesburg
- Spouse: Kojo Tsikata
- Education: University of South Africa
- Profession: Clinical psychologist

Zonke Zanele Majodina (13 September 1944 - 10 July 2024) was a South African academic, clinical psychologist and human rights worker.

== Education life and education ==
Majodina was born on 13 September 1944 in Cape Town, South Africa. She studied at the University of South Africa where she graduated with a B.Sc. (Hons) degree in Psychology. She went on to the University of London where she studied for a master's degree in Philosophy degree in Clinical Psychology. She obtained a doctorate degree in clinical psychology from the University of Cape Town.

== Career ==
Due to apartheid in South Africa, she was in exile in Ghana for 18 years. While there, she worked as a Clinical Psychologist and lecturer at the University of Ghana Medical School. She spent a further 2 years as a Visiting Fellow at the Refugees Studies Center of the Oxford University. Majodina served with the Public Services Commission of South Africa for a while before she was invited by the University of the Witwatersrand to develop a Master's level programme in Forced Migration Studies in 1998. This is now established as the African Centre for Migration Studies. In 2022, she was Visiting adjunct professor at the University of the Witwatersrand. She was also a member of the Magistrates’ Commission of South Africa. Following this, she was appointed a part-time Commissioner with the South African Human Rights Commission where she worked on extending human rights protection for migrants as well as promoting the right to equality in principle. She served for 8 years as a member of the United Nations Human Rights Committee (UNHRC). In addition, she served as Chairperson of the UNHRC for two years.

In her role as visiting professor at the Centre for Applied Legal Studies at the University of the Witwatersrand, she was instrumental on the review of the Equality Court system in partnership with the South African Human Rights Commission. She was also on the board of directors of the Human Rights Institute of South Africa (HURISA).

== Family ==
Majodina was married to Kojo Tsikata.

== Death ==
Majodina died in Johannesburg following a short illness. She had two sons, Mandla and Kojo.
