= Ato Austin =

Ghanaian politician

Central Regional Secretary
- In office 1988–1993
- President: Jerry Rawlings

Secretary for Youth and Sports
- In office 1986–1988
- President: Jerry Rawlings
- Preceded by: Amarkai Amarteifio
- Succeeded by: K. Saarah Mensah

Secretary for Labour and Social Welfare
- In office 1983–1986
- President: Jerry Rawlings
- Preceded by: Adisa Munkaila
- Succeeded by: George Adamu

Secretary for Information
- In office 1982–1983
- President: Jerry Rawlings
- Preceded by: John S. Nabila
- Succeeded by: Joyce Aryee

Personal details
- Died: 1998 London
- Party: People's National Party

Ato Austin was a Ghanaian politician. He was a member of the Provisional National Defence Council (PNDC) military government which ruled after the overthrow of the Limann government in December 1981. He held various portfolios in the government led by Jerry Rawlings.

== Politics ==
Ato Austin was the Secretary-General of the Youth Wing of the People's National Party (PNP) before going into government. After the PNDC was formed, Austin was among several student leaders and activists who were given appointments at various levels in Ghana. Austin was initially appointed the Secretary for Information in January 1982. Kwame Karikari, a former Director General of the Ghana Broadcasting Corporation which runs GTV disclosed how he lobbied Austin as Secretary for Information and Rawlings leading to the country seeking a grant from Japan for the switch to colour TV transmission in Ghana from 1985.

Following a reshuffle in 1983, Austin was appointed Secretary for Labour and Social Welfare Later in September 1982, he gave assurances that the Public Tribunals created by the PNDC government would not use "unorthodox" measures in their functions.

Austin served as Secretary for Youth and Sports between 1986 and 1988.

He also served as Central Regional secretary under Flight Lieutenant Jerry Rawlings. He is credited to have inspired the creation of walkways for tourism purposes in the region such as the Kakum National Park among others after a visit to Malaysia where he saw canopy walkway.

== Awards ==
- Osabarimba Royal Award (posthumous) for services as former Central Regional Secretary

== Death ==
Austin died in London in December 1998.

== See also ==
- Provisional National Defence Council
