= Vincent Kwabena Damuah =

Ghanaian Catholic priest and politician

Member of the Provisional National Defence Council
- In office January 1982 – November 1982

Personal details
- Born: April 1930
- Died: August 1992 (aged 62)
- Occupation: Priest

Reverend Father Dr. Vincent Kwabena Damuah (April 1930 – August 1992) was a Catholic priest, theologian and politician in Ghana. He was a member of the Provisional National Defence Council (PNDC) government and was also the founder of the Afrikania Mission. He was also referred to as Osɔfo Okɔmfo Damuah. Dr. Dumuah received a Ph.D. in African Studies from Howard University in 1971.He was the first Ghanaian Catholic priest who diverted back to practice the African traditional religion and help in writing the first African Scriptures called EDU. He formed the African religious group called the Afrikian Mission which is widely based in South Africa, he championed the Africa Spiritual emancipation.

== Priesthood ==
Rev. Father Damuah was a Roman Catholic priest from 1957 to 1982. He was once a consultant of Afro-American Affairs in the diocese of Pittsburgh in the United States. He returned to Ghana in 1976. He was suspended from his priestly ministry by the Catholic Church, because of his involvement with the PNDC government. In December 1982, Rev. Damuah founded the Afrikania Mission, an organization devoted to the promotion of African Traditional Religion.

== Politics ==
Rev. Damuah was detained during the Nkrumah era. This was for criticising the Convention People's Party government for the deportation of Bishop Reginald Richard Roseveare, the then Anglican Bishop of Accra. He was released following the personal intervention of Archbishop John Kodwo Amissah, Catholic Archbishop of Cape Coast During the four month rule of the Armed Forces Revolutionary Council (AFRC) in 1979, he was on record to have supported the executions, which included three former heads of state of Ghana, although the Christian Council of Ghana opposed it. He wrote:

We do not love those executed less but we love our country more. Why all

the fuss about execution? I believe that the A.F.R.C has the right to exact capital punishment for the common good of the country. We hope and pray that the number is not too large. Christ died on the cross to save mankind. We hope and pray that those who have to die, accept the challenge

courageously and prayerfully to save Ghana.

Rev. Damuah was appointed a member of the PNDC on 2 January 1982. This led to his suspension by the Catholic Church from his priestly duties. He had however resigned from government by late 1982.

== Publications ==
- Introduction to traditional religion: Afrikania Reformed African Traditional Religion [Religious text, Afrikania Mission, 1988] 2nd edition
- Kwabena Damuah, African Contribution to Civilization (Accra: Nsamankow Press, 1985).
- Damuah, Kwabena. Afrikania Handbook. Accra: Nsamankow Press, 1982.

Kwabena Damuah. Afrikania (Reformed Traditional Religion). Common Sense Series 8. Accra: Afrikania Mission, 1984. ———. African Contribution to Civilization. Accra: Nsamankow Press, 1985.

Kwabena Damuah, Miracle at the Shrine, Damess Press, 1990.

New title	Head of the Afrikania Mission; 1982 – 1992	Succeeded by Kofi Ameve
