= David Sarpong Boateng =

Ghanaian politician (1943–2016)

Minister for Employment and Social Welfare
- In office 1993–1997
- President: Jerry Rawlings
- Preceded by: (restructured)
- Succeeded by: Muhammad Mumuni
- Parliamentary group: National Democratic Congress
- Constituency: Koforidua

Secretary for Labour and Social Welfare, Mobilization and Productivity
- In office 1989–1993
- President: Jerry Rawlings
- Preceded by: George Adamu
- Succeeded by: (restructured)

Ghana Ambassador to Cuba
- In office 2009–2013
- President: John Atta Mills

Member of Parliament for Koforidua
- In office 7 January 1993 – 6 January 1997
- President: Jerry Rawlings
- Preceded by: Military rule
- Succeeded by: Yaw Barimah
- Parliamentary group: National Democratic Congress
- Constituency: Koforidua

Personal details
- Born: David Yaw Sarpong Boateng; 9 October 1943 Koforidua
- Died: c. 2016 (aged 72)
- Citizenship: Ghanaian
- Party: National Democratic Congress
- Education: University of Cape Coast; Cornell University
- Occupation: Teacher
- Profession: Trade unionist, politician

David Sarpong Boateng (9 October 1943 – c. 2016) was a Ghanaian politician and an Educationist. He served for the Koforidua constituency in the Eastern region of Ghana as member of the first parliament of the fourth republic of Ghana.

== Early life and education ==
Boateng was born on October 9, 1943. He attended the University of Cape Coast and obtained his Bachelor of Arts. He had a degree in history, Sociology and Education. He also studied at Cornell University, New York where he obtained a certificate in Industrial Relations.

== Politics ==
Boateng was elected during the 1992 Ghanaian parliamentary election as member of the first parliament of the fourth republic of Ghana on the ticket of the National Democratic Congress. In 1996 Ghanaian general election, he lost the seat to Yaw Barima of the New Patriotic Party (NPP) who won with 26,025 votes representing 47.20% of the share. He defeated David Sarpong Boateng who obtained 18,648 votes representing 33.80% of the share, Nana Jonathan R. Osei-Bonsu of the People's National Convention (PNC) who obtained 1,366 votes representing 2.50% of the share, Kwame Larbi Nyanteh of the Convention People's Party (CPP) who obtained 249 votes representing 0.50% of the share and Edward Kwaku Boaten of the National Convention Party(NCP) who obtained 170 votes representing 0.30% of the share.

In 1997, Sarpong assured civil servants that the government had not abandoned the idea of removing disparities that have characterised wages and salaries of workers. He delivered the keynote address at the opening of a three-day emergency national executive council meeting of the Civil Servants Association of Ghana (CSAG) at Koforidua.

== Career ==
David Sarpong Boateng was a former Member of Parliament for Koforidua from 7 January 1993 to 7 January 1997. He was an Educationist, a former Minister of State in the Ex-President Jerry John Rawlings' Administration and former ambassador for the Embassy of Ghana in Havana (Cuba). He first taught as a pupil teacher at Kobokobo near Huhuya on the Koforidua Somanya road and later as a teacher at the Koforidua Catholic Middle school. He was also a Deputy Secretary at the Ministry of Labour and Social Welfare.

== Death ==
He died at the age of 72 and left behind his wife, Madam Akua Dwubi, three children and three stepchildren.

== Personal life ==
He was a Christian.

== See also ==
- List of MPs elected in the 1992 Ghanaian parliamentary election
- Provisional National Defence Council
- Rawlings government

== External sources ==
- Former Deputy Secretary D.S. Boateng laid to rest on GBC online
