= Susanna Al-Hassan =

Ghanaian author and politician

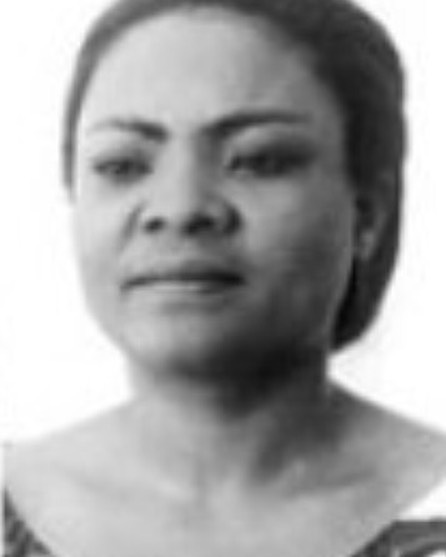

Member of the Ghana Parliament for Northern Region
- In office 1960–1966

Provisional National Defence Council Member
- In office 1984–1987
- President: Jerry Rawlings

Minister of Social Affairs and Community Development
- In office 1963–1966
- President: Kwame Nkrumah

Personal details
- Born: 20 November 1927
- Died: 17 January 1997 (aged 69)
- Party: Convention People's Party
- Education: Achimota School
- Occupation: Author
- First female Minister of State in Ghana

Susanna Al-Hassan or Susan Alhassan née Henkel (27 November 1927 – 17 January 1997) was a Ghanaian author and politician, who in 1961 became Ghana's first female to be appointed minister. She was the first African woman to hold a cabinet portfolio and became the member of parliament for the then Northern Region parliamentary constituency between 1960 and 1966. She also wrote several children's books.

== Early life and education ==
Al-Hassan was born in Tamale to Wilhelm Henkel and Hajia Memuna Giwah and was educated at Achimota School. From 1955 to 1960 she was headmistress of Bolgatanga Girls' Middle School. She was the mother of former GTV News anchor Selma Ramatu Alhassan who later became Selma Valcourt, Victor Alhassan of Sky Petroleum, Kassem Alhassan and Tihiiru Alhassan.

== Career ==
A beneficiary of the 1960 Representation of the People's (Women Members) Bill, Al-Hassan was returned unopposed as an MP representing the Northern Region in June 1960. She took on various ministerial position, some of which lasted for short periods whiles others were merged or expanded. From 1961 to 1963, she was the Deputy Minister of Education in Nkrumah's republican government. From 1963 to 1966, and again in 1967, she was Minister of Social Affairs. In 1965, Nkrumah appointed her as the Minister of Social Welfare and Community Development.

On the fight against prostitution in northern Ghana, in the 1960s, the CPP government engaged in mass education campaigns that emphasized the association of prostitution with "social evil", "enemy" and "crusade", among the aged and illiterate population. Al-Hassan asserted that the problem rather lay with "the soaring rate of depravity and lewdness among our younger generation especially school girls and young working girls" who traveled to Tamale for work or school.

== Political Strategy ==
While the 1960 Women Members Bill was a national initiative, Al-Hassan’s appointment was a strategic move by Dr. Kwame Nkrumah to ensure the North was not left behind in the post-independence developmental agenda.

Bridging the Educational Gap: Her background as a headmistress in Bolgatanga was vital. At a time when formal education for girls in Northern Ghana lagged behind the South due to colonial-era policies, she used her platform to advocate for increased enrollment of northern girls in boarding schools.

Social Welfare Reform: Beyond the fight against prostitution mentioned in your text, she was instrumental in formalizing the Department of Social Welfare and Community Development. She integrated "home science" into rural community programs, teaching women about nutrition, sanitation, and child care as a form of grassroots empowerment.

== Death ==
Al-Hassan died on 17 January 1997. In 2007, she was commemorated on a 50th anniversary stamp by former President John Agyekum Kuffour, 10 years after her death.

== Works ==
- Issa and Amina, 1963
- Asana and the magic calabash, Longman, 1963. Republished, 1998
- Two tales, 1966
- The river that became a lake : the building of the Volta Dam, 1979
- The river that became a lake: The story of the Volta river project, 1979
- Voices of wisdom, 1994
- 'The Role of Women in Politics in Ghana', Feminist Perspectives, Ottawa: MATCH International Centre, 1994, 9–18.

Parliament of Ghana
| Preceded by | Member of Parliament for Northern Region; 1960 – 1966 | Succeeded by |
Political offices
| Preceded by | Minister of Social Affairs and Community Development; 1963 – 1966 | Succeeded by |
| Preceded by | Minister of Social Affairs; 1967 | Succeeded by |
