= Joachim Amartey Quaye =

Ghanaian politician

Member of the Provisional National Defence Council
- In office 11 January 1982 – August 1982
- President: Jerry Rawlings (Head of state)

Personal details
- Born: Ghana
- Died: 18 August 1983 Nsawam, Ghana
- Occupation: Politician

Joachim Amartey Quaye was a Ghanaian politician. He was found guilty of involvement in the murder of four Ghanaian citizens and executed by a firing squad in 1982.

== Politics ==
Amartey Quaye was one of the original seven members of the Provisional National Defence Council appointed after the military overthrow of the Limann government of the Third Republic of Ghana.

== Murder of judges ==
During the hours of a night time curfew in force on 30 June 1982, three judges, Justices Kwadwo Agyei Agyapong, Fred Poku Sarkodee and Cecilia Koranteng-Addow and a retired army officer Major Sam Acquah were abducted from their homes. Their charred bodies were found on 3 July 1982 at the Bundase Military Range, 50 kilometers from Accra. They had been murdered. All four had adjudicated on cases in which they had ordered the release of persons who had been sentenced to long terms of imprisonment, during the rule of the Armed Forces Revolutionary Council (AFRC) which had also been led by Jerry Rawlings in 1979. Following intense pressure on the PNDC government, a Special Investigation Board (SIB) was formed to investigate the murders. A former Chief Justice of Ghana, Samuel Azu Crabbe was appointed the Chairman of the SIB. Their work led to the recommendation that ten persons including two members of the PNDC, Amartey Quaye and Daniel Alolga Akata Pore be prosecuted. A third, a retired army captain, Kojo Tsikata, was a PNDC Special Advisor and Head of National Security. The names of Kojo Tsikata and Nana Konadu Agyeman-Rawlings came up amidst suggestions that they had had some involvement in the murder plot. One Chris Asher, alleged during a sitting of the National Reconciliation Commission in 2004 that Amedeka had admitted to him that the murders were ordered by Tsikata.

== Trial and execution ==
Amartey Quaye and four others, namely Lance Corporal Amedeka, Michael Senyah, Tekpor Hekli and Johnny Dzandu eventually faced trial and were convicted. They were held at the Nsawam Prison until their execution by a firing squad. Squadron Leader George Tagoe, a former Ghana Air Force officer and a former AFRC prisoner as well, also reported during the sitting of the National Reconciliation Commission that Amartey Quaye had admitted to him while they were in prison that Jerry Rawlings, who was then Chairman of the AFRC and Kojo Tsikata were involved in the killing of the judges. Rawlings tried to clear allegations of a cover up, in his own way by apparently attempting to extract confessions just prior to Amartey Quaye's execution. The execution was carried out by a firing squad at a shooting range, "near John Teye Memorial School near Nsawam".
