= Elvis Afriyie Ankrah =

Ghanaian politician

Former Minister for Youth and Sports
- In office 14 February 2013 – 16 July 2014
- President: John Dramani Mahama
- Preceded by: Clement Kofi Humado
- Succeeded by: Mahama Ayariga

Deputy Minister for Local Government and Rural Development
- In office March 2009 – 7 January 2013
- President: John Atta Mills; John Dramani Mahama

Personal details
- Born: 6 January 1967 (age 59)
- Party: National Democratic Congress
- Education: University of Ghana

Elvis Afriyie Ankrah (born 6 January 1967) is a Ghanaian politician. He is the former Minister for Youth and Sports in Ghana.

== Early life and education ==
Elvis Afriyie Ankrah was born in 1967 in Ghana. His mother hailed from Atiavi, near Keta, in the Volta Region and his father was from Ahenema Kokoben, that is located in the Ashanti Region. He attended Okuapemman Secondary School, graduating in 1984 with the GCE Ordinary Level. He also attended the London College of Computing and Electronics where he obtained a certificate in Business and Administrative Computing in 1986. His sixth form education was at the Winneba Secondary School in the Central Region of Ghana where he attained the GCE Advanced Level in 1988. He attended the University of Ghana between 1992 and 1996 and graduated with a Bachelor of Arts Honours degree in English, Drama and Linguistics. He was also a postgraduate student of the same university, obtaining the Master of Arts degree in International Affairs from the Legon Centre for International Affairs in 2002. He is a graduate of the Ghana Institute of Journalism which he completed in 1998. He received a certificate in Public Relations, Marketing and Advertising there.

== Occupation ==
Elvis Ankrah has worked in various capacities with various firms. From 1984 to 1986, he worked with AMOGA Works (a garment factory) as the Personal Assistant to the managing director. He was also the personal assistant to the managing director of Omega Works in London between 1984 and 1986. After his sixth form education, he also worked with Grasam Enterprises from 1989 to 1992. Following his first degree, he became the Executive Co-ordinating Secretary of the National Union of Ghana Students from May 1996 to October 1997. After his national service, he worked as Operations Manager of Annrose Protocol Services Limited, a company which provided public relations, events management consultancy and protocol duties for invited guests and government officials during the first emancipation day celebration in Ghana in 1998. Following that, he worked as a sales and marketing executive of the Mechanical Lloyd Company Limited from 1998 to 2000. From June 2001 to June 2003, he worked as the Research Officer/Special Assistant to the Programs Director at the Legal Resources Centre in Accra, where he was in charge of drawing up programs; organizing stakeholders, policy makers, opinion leaders, legislators and government officials to hold round table discussions, seminars, workshops and symposia towards passage of various Parliamentary Legislations under USAID sponsorship. Between August 2005 to December 2008, he was a Lecturer and the head of English and Communication Studies Department at the University of Professional Studies near Legon in Accra.

== Politics ==
Ankrah was involved in student politics. He was the President of the Students Representative Council of the University of Ghana between 1994 and 1996. He joined the National Democratic Congress and stood as a parliamentary candidate at Ayawaso West Wuogon constituency in the December 2000 elections. He was the Deputy National Campaign Manager for the 2008 and National Campaign Coordinator for 2012 Presidential Campaigns of the National Democratic Congress and both Presidents, John Atta Mills and John Dramani Mahama. In March 2009, he was appointed a Deputy Minister at the Ministry of Local Government and Rural Development by President Mills. He continued in this capacity until President Mahama replaced Mills. In February 2013, he was appointed Minister for Youth and Sports by Mahama. In July 2014, he became a Minister of State at the Office of the President, a position following a cabinet reshuffle by President Mahama.

== Personal life ==
Ankrah is married with 3 children.

== See also ==
- List of Mahama government ministers
- National Democratic Congress

== External links and sources ==
- Profile on Ghana government website

Political offices
Preceded by Clement Kofi Humado	Minister for Youth and Sports; 2013 – 2014	Succeeded by Mahama Ayariga
