= Kwame Saarah-Mensah =

Ghanaian diplomat and politician

Kwame Saarah-Mensah is a Ghanaian diplomat and politician. He served as Ghana's High Commissioner to India and is a former Minister of Youth and Sports. He was the Chairman of the Kwame Nkrumah University of Science and Technology Council.

== Diplomatic career ==
In the early 1980s Saarah-Mensah was appointed by the Chairman of the Provisional National Defence Council, Jerry John Rawlings to serve Ghana's High Commissioner to India replacing Silverster Kwadwo Ankama He served from January 1984 to December 1988.

== Politics ==
Saarah-Mensah served as Brong-Ahafo Regional Secretary and the secretary equivalent to Regional Minister. He also served as the secretary in charge of Ministry of Youth and Sports from 1988 to 1991.
