= Amarkai Amarteifio =

Ghanaian politician

Major Amarkai Amarteifio is a Ghanaian retired soldier, lawyer, sports administrator and politician. He served as Ghana's Minister for Youth and Sports during the Provisional National Defence Council era.

== Politics ==
Amarteifio was appointed by Jerry Rawlings, then Chairman of the Provisional National Defence Council (PNDC) to serve as Secretary for Youth and Sports. He served in that role from 1983 – 1987.

== Sports administration ==
Amarteifio is currently the board chairman of Accra Great Olympics.
