= Asiedu Yirenkyi =

Ghanaian playwright (1942–2018)

Asiedu Yirenkyi (8 December 1942 – 10 May 2018) was a Ghanaian playwright, actor, director, theatre company manager and author of screen plays.

== Biography ==
He was born Emmanuel Asiedu Yirenchi at Amanase in the Eastern Region of Ghana to Charles Okata Yirenkyi, a farmer and Comfort Yaa Nyarkoa, a homemaker and belonged to the Akyepere Kotoku clan (quarter) of Mampong Akuapem. He was the younger brother of the late Ghanaian actor and film maker Rev. Kofi Yirenkyi and the nephew of Ghanaian medical doctor and sculptor Dr. Oku Ampofo.

Yirenkyi's name has been associated with pioneering roles in Drama and the National Theatre movement from the early days of Ghana's independence. He was a member of Ghana's first experimental theatre group in the late 1950s. In the early 1960s he joined Efua Sutherland's Drama Studio players as a boy actor and was among the group of studio players who performed on the night Dr. Kwame Nkrumah formally opened the Drama Studio in 1960. His formal education in Theatre began with a Diploma in Drama from the University of Ghana, Legon. In 1968, when Yirenkyi gained admission into the Yale School of Drama he made history by becoming the first Ghanaian to receive a grant to study drama in the USA. He graduated in 1971 with the prestigious John Golden Scholar Award in Playwriting. At Yale his mates included African American Theatre icon Walter Dallas and Henry Winkler. During his studentship at Yale he taught African history and African Literature at the James Hillhouse High School in New Haven, Connecticut. He returned to Ghana after his studies and lectured at the University of Ghana, Legon and at the Ahmadu Bello University in Zaria, Nigeria.

Like writer Ama Ata Aidoo, also involved in the Ghana Drama Studio, Yirenkyi later served as a minister in the Provisional National Defence Council of Jerry Rawlings: he was Secretary for Culture and Tourism from 1982 to 1984, when he resigned. It was under his political leadership in 1983 that the first elaborate work on Ghana's Cultural Policy was carried out. Yirenkyi later served twice as the chairman of Ghana's National Folklore Board and as a World Bank consultant on the National Theatre of Ghana.

He died on 10 May 2018 and in line with his wishes was interred at Mampong Akuapem

== Works ==
- Kivuli and other plays, 1980
- Dasebre: a play on African rituals and games, 1990
- Two Plays: Dasebre and The Red Ants, 2003
