= 1981 Ghanaian coup d'état =

Military overthrow of Hilla Limann

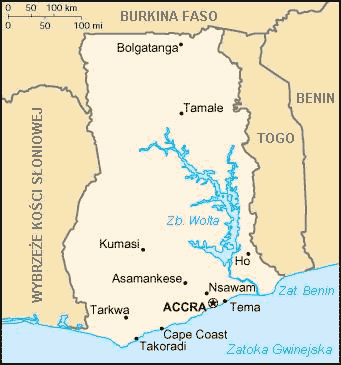
Date	December 31, 1981
Location	Ghana
Result	Coup attempt successful: Formation of the Provisional National Defence Council; Jerry Rawlings returns to power

Belligerents
Ghana Armed Forces	(Ghana) Dissenting faction of the armed forces

Commanders and leaders
(Ghana) Hilla Limann	(Ghana) Jerry Rawlings

The 1981 Ghanaian coup d'état was a successful government takeover in Ghana led by Air Force Flight Lieutenant Jerry Rawlings, overthrowing the administration of President Hilla Limann and establishing the Provisional National Defence Council (PNDC), with Jerry Rawlings assuming leadership of the country. The second of two coups to be orchestrated by Jerry Rawlings (the first taking place in 1979), the 1981 coup d'état was motivated by Rawling's dissatisfaction with the management of the country under the Limann administration, as Ghana's economic situation, plagued by spiraling foreign debt and hyperinflation, continued to deteriorate without any real promised political change. Thus, on December 31, 1981, Jerry Rawlings intervened once again in a leftist-backed coup, replacing the government with the PNDC and seeking to transform the country into a Marxist state.

In the initial first years of the 11 year-long PNDC regime, Ghana underwent a communist experiment as workers councils were established and the country turned to the Soviet Union for support. These efforts were soon abandoned however, with Rawlings making a U-turn and backtracking on his past policies by pursuing liberal economic policies, such as: devaluing the nation's currency, privatizing state enterprises, and doing western-backed Economic Recovery Programs (ERPs) and Structural Adjustment Programs (SAPs). These ERPs and SAPs, under the guidance of the International Monetary Fund (IMF) and World Bank, while essential in Ghana's economic stabilization, faced significant opposition from the left and the labor unions as the measures caused anti-labor wage increases and price hikes that heavily reduced living conditions for the working class. By 1987, Ghana had become a model for structural adjustment, fully aligning itself with the IMF and World Bank.

During the final years of the regime, the country began democratizing. In 1991, the Consultative Assembly was established by Rawlings and tasked with drafting a new constitution. The drafted 1992 Constitution, which included the clear separation of the executive, legislative, and judicial branches, were approved overwhelmingly by the electorate on April 28, 1992. On January 7, 1993, the new constitution finally came into effect, marking the end of the PNDC and the beginning of the Fourth Ghanaian Republic.

On December 3, 1992, the 1992 Presidential Election was held, the first free and fair election since 1979. Running as a candidate for the newly established National Democratic Congress (NDC), Jerry Rawlings was successfully elected as the President of Ghana, later winning a second term in the 1996 Ghana Presidential Election. In accordance with the constitution, he stepped down from the presidency after having served his two terms in early 2001. John Kufuor of the New Patriotic Party (NPP) succeeded him, marking the first peaceful transfer of power in the country's history.
