= Limann government =

Ministers who served in Limann's People's National Party government

This is a listing of the ministers who served in Limann's People's National Party government during the Third Republic of Ghana. The Third Republic was inaugurated on 24 September 1979. It ended with the coup on 31 December 1981, which brought the Provisional National Defence Council of Jerry Rawlings to power.

== List of ministers ==
Portfolio	Minister	Time frame	Notes
President	Hilla Limann	September 1979 – 31 December 1981	
Vice President	Joseph W. S. de-Graft Johnson	September 1979 – 31 December 1981	
Minister for Foreign Affairs	Isaac Chinebuah	September 1979 – 31 December 1981	
Minister for Interior	Ekow Daniels	September 1979 – October 1981	
Minister for Interior	Kwame Sanaa-Poku Jantuah	October 1981 – 31 December 1981	
Minister for Defence	S. K. Riley-Poku	September 1979 – December 1981	
Attorney General and Minister for Justice	Joe Reindorf	September 1979 – October 1981	
Attorney General and Minister for Justice	Archibald Lartey Djabatey	October 1981 – 31 December 1981	
Minister for Finance and Economic Planning	Amon Nikoi	1979 – May 1981	
Minister for Finance and Economic Planning	George Benneh	May 1981 – 31 December 1981	
Minister for Health	Michael Paul Ansah	1979 – 1981	
Minister for Health	Kwamena Ocran	August 1981 – 31 December 1981	
Minister for Local Government	Kwame Sanaa-Poku Jantuah	September 1979 – October 1981	
Minister for Education, Culture and Sports	Kwamena Ocran	September 1979 – 1980	
Minister for Education, Culture and Sports	Francis Kwame Buah	1980 – 1981	
Minister for Agriculture	E. Kwaku Twumasi	1979 – ?	
Minister for Agriculture	E. Kwaku Andah	? – December 1980	
Minister for Agriculture	Nelson Agbesi	December 1980 – December 1981	
Minister for Trade and Tourism	Francis Kwame Buah	1979 – 1980	
Minister for Trade and Tourism	Vincent Bulla	1980 – December 1981	
Minister for Transport and Communications	Harry Sawyerr	September 1979 – December 1981	
Minister for Works and Housing	Colonel David Zanlerigu	1979 – ?	
Minister for Works and Housing	Felix Amoah	? – ?	
Minister for Industries, Science and Technology	Vincent Bulla	September 1979 – 1980	
Minister for Industries, Science and Technology	Col. David Zanlerigu	1980 – August 1981	
Minister for Industries, Science and Technology	Michael Paul Ansah	August 1981 – December 1981	
Minister for Lands and Natural Resources	E. F. Yeboah Acheampong	? – ?	
Minister for Labour, Youth and Social Welfare	Frank Q. Amega	1979 – ?	
Minister for Labour, Youth and Social Welfare	Adisa Munkaila	November 1980 – December 1981	
Minister for Information, Presidential Affairs and Special Initiatives	John S. Nabila	September 1979 - 1980	
Minister for Fuel and Energy	George Benneh	1979 - November 1980	
Minister for Fuel and Energy	F. Wulff Tagoe	November 1980 – ?	
Minister for Youth and Rural Development	E. Kwaku Andah	? – ?	
Minister for Information and Tourism	Yaw Opoku Afriyie	? – ?	
Minister for Culture and Sport	Thomas G. Abilla	? – ?	
Regional Ministers
Ashanti Regional Minister	J. O. Afram	? – ?	
Brong Ahafo Region	E. K. Twumasi(MP) S.G. Arthur( Deputy Minister)	? – ?	Dep:
Central Regional Minister	Kankam da Costa	? – ?	
Eastern Regional Minister	F. K. B. Amoah	? – ?	
Greater Accra Regional Minister	I. T. Torto	? – December 1981	
Northern Regional Minister	Alhaji I. Haruna	c. 1980	
Upper Region	G. Nango	? – ?	
Volta Regional Minister	Nelson Agbesi (MP)	December 1979 – December 1980	
Volta Regional Minister	F. Q. Amegah	? – ?	
Western Region	Sam Cudjoe	? – ?	

== See also ==
- People's National Party

Preceded by Armed Forces Revolutionary Council (1979)	Government of Ghana; 1979 – 1981	Succeeded by Provisional National Defence Council (1981-1993)
