= Provisional National Defence Council =

Government of Ghana from 1981 to 1993, led by Jerry Rawlings

Overview
- Established: 31 December 1981
- Dissolved: 7 January 1993
- State: Ghana
- Leader: Chairman (Jerry Rawlings)
- Headquarters: Accra

The Provisional National Defence Council (PNDC) was the name of the Ghanaian government after the People's National Party's elected government was overthrown by Jerry Rawlings, the former head of the Armed Forces Revolutionary Council, in a coup d'état on 31 December 1981. He remained in power until 7 January 1993. In a statement, Rawlings said that a "holy war" was necessary due to the PNP's failure to provide effective leadership and the collapse of the national economy and state services.

The PNDC was a military dictatorship that induced civilians to participate in governance. Most of its members were civilians. Its policies reflected a revolutionary government that was pragmatic in its approach. The economic objectives of the PNDC were to halt Ghana's economic decay, stabilize the economy, and stimulate economic growth. The PNDC also brought a change in the people's attitude from a 'government will provide' position to participating in nation-building.

The PNDC provided a new constitution in 1992 and held elections that year. Rawlings's party, the NDC, won the presidential election with 58% of the vote. The opposition boycotted the subsequent parliamentary elections.

== Members ==
The seven original members of the PNDC from its inception were as follows:

- Flt. Lt. Jerry John Rawlings - Chairman
- Brigadier Joseph Nunoo-Mensah - retired Chief of Defence Staff
- Reverend Dr. Vincent Kwabena Damuah
- Warrant Officer I Joseph Adjei Buadi
- Sergeant Daniel Alolga Akata Pore
- Joachim Amartey Quaye
- Chris Bukari Atim

Brigadier Nunoo-Mensah, who had been retired by the Limann government, was recalled as Chief of Defence Staff and the second-in-command of the PNDC. Reverend Damuah was an outspoken priest of the Roman Catholic Church in Ghana. Joachim Amartey Quaye was a labour leader who led a strike at the Ghana Industrial Holding Corporation (GIHOC) and was removed by Hilla Limann's government. Chris Bukari Atim was a student leader and friend of Jerry Rawlings. Adjei Buadi and Akata Pore were junior ranks in the Ghana Air Force.

=== Departures and replacements ===
Over the years, some people were added to the membership and others left. A number left in 1982 due to ideological differences. Joachim Amartey Quaye was executed for his involvement in the murder of three senior judges and a retired army officer. Rev. Damuah who was suspended from the Catholic Church because of his involvement in the government left in late 1982 and started his own church later called the Afrikania Mission, an organization devoted to the promotion of African Traditional Religion.

Additions

- Mrs. Aanaa Naamua Enin- appointed August 1982
- Ebo Tawiah - appointed August 1982
- Naa Polku Konkuu Chiiri - appointed January 1983
- Justice D.F. Annan- appointed 1984
- Alhaji Mahama Iddrisu - appointed October 1984
- Captain (rtd) Kojo Tsikata - July 1985
- P. V. Obeng - July 1985
- Major General Arnold Quainoo
- Maj. Gen. Winston C.M. Mensa-Wood
- Captain (rtd) Kingsley Bruce
- Air Vice Marshal A. H. K. Dumashie
- Dr. Mrs. Mary Grant - appointed 1989
- Mrs. Susanna Al-Hassan - appointed 1985

Departures

- Brigadier Joseph Nunoo Mensah - resigned 1982
- Rev. Dr. Kwabena Damuah - resigned 1982
- Warrant Officer I Mumuni Seidu- resigned June 1994
- Warrant Officer I Joseph Adjei Buadi - resigned December 1984
- Sergeant Daniel Alolga Akata Pore - 1982
- Joachim Amartey Quaye - executed August 1982
- Chris Bukari Atim - resigned 1982
- Ebo Tawiah
- Naa Polku Konkuu Chiiri - died 25 August 1984
- Brigadier W. M. Mensa-Wood - died 1992
- Captain Kingsley Bruce
- Mrs. Susanna Al-Hassan - departed 1987
- Mrs. Aanaa Naamua Enin - left in 1989

=== August 1992 onwards — final membership ===
- Flt. Lt. Jerry John Rawlings - Chairman
- Justice D. F. Annan
- Alhaji Mahama Iddrisu
- Captain (rtd) Kojo Tsikata
- P. V. Obeng
- Lieutenant General Arnold Quainoo
- Air Vice Marshal Dumashie
- Dr. Mrs. Mary Grant

== Membership ==
=== PNDC Members ===
Position	Name	From	To	Notes
Head of state of Ghana and Chairman	Flight Lieutenant Jerry John Rawlings	December 1981	January 1993	
Chief of the Defence Staff	Brigadier Joseph Nunoo-Mensah	January 1982	November 1982	Reappointed Chief of Defence Staff from Jan 1982 to Nov 1982
Member	Vincent Kwabena Damuah	January 1982	1982	Catholic priest
Member	Warrant Officer I Joseph Adjei Buadi	January 1982	December 1984	Coordinator for the Armed Forces Defence Committees
Member	Sergeant Daniel Alolga Akata Pore	January 1982	1982	Secretary Armed Forces Defence Committee
Member	Joachim Amartey Quaye	January 1982	August 1982	Union leader
Member	Chris Bukari Atim	January 1982	1982	General Secretary of the June Fourth Movement, Former First national vice president of the National Union of Ghana Students
Member	Aanaa Naamua Enin	August 1982	December 1989	
Member	Ebo Tawiah	August 1982	?	Trade Union leader
Member	Alhaji Mahama Iddrisu	October 1984	January 1993	Politician and businessman
Member	Captain Kojo Tsikata	July 1985	January 1993	National Security and Foreign Affairs, Retired soldier
Chairman of Committee of Secretaries	Paul Victor Obeng	July 1985	January 1993	Former student leader and Mechanical Engineer
Member	Lieutenant General Arnold Quainoo	1982	January 1993	Chief of Defence Staff from 1983 to 1999
Member	Naa Polku Konkuu Chiiri	1983	1984	Nandom Naa; Died in office
Member and Chairman of the National Commission for Democracy	Justice Daniel Francis Annan	1984	January 1993	Retired Appeals Court Judge
Member	Susanna Al-Hassan	1985	1987	Ghana's first female minister in 1961 and author
Member	Maj. Gen. Winston C. M. Mensa-Wood	1987	1992	Chief of the Defence Staff, 1990 - 1992; Died in office March 1992
Member	Mary Grant	1989	January 1993	Medical doctor
Member	Air Vice Marshal A. H. K. Dumashie	1992	January 1993	Chief of Air Staff until 1992; Chief of Defence Staff from March 1992.

== Secretaries ==
The officials in charge of the various ministries were designated as Secretaries of state.

=== List of secretaries (ministers) of state ===
Portfolio	Secretary	From	To	Notes
Chairman of Committee of Secretaries	Paul Victor Obeng	1982	1993	
Secretary for Foreign Affairs	Obed Asamoah	January 1982	1993	
Secretary for the Interior	Johnny F. S. Hansen	January 1982	Apr 1982	
Secretary for the Interior	J. M. Ewa	Apr 1982	Dec 1982	
Secretary for the Interior	Kofi Djin	Dec 1982	Nov 1985	
Secretary for the Interior	Major General Winston Mensa-Wood	Nov 1985	Oct 1987	
Secretary for the Interior	Nii Okaidja Adamafio	Oct 1987	May 1991	
Secretary for the Interior	Nana Akuoko Sarpong	May 1991	Mar 1992	
Secretary for the Interior	Colonel E. M. Osei-Wusu	Mar 1992	Jan 1993	
Secretary for Finance	Kwesi Botchwey	1982	1993	
Secretary for Defence	Naa Polku Konkuu Chirii	1982	Nov 1983	
Secretary for Defence	Rear Admiral C. K. Dzang	22 Nov 1983	1985	
Secretary for Defence	Mahama Iddrisu	1985	6 Jan 1993	
Attorney General and Secretary for Justice	G. E. K. Aikins	January 1982	1992	
Attorney General and Secretary for Justice	E.G. Tanoh	1992	1993	
Secretary for Education and Culture	Christina Ama Ata Aidoo	January 1982	1983	
Secretary for Education and Culture	V. C. Dadson	1983	?	
Secretary for Education and Culture	Joyce Aryee	1985	1987	
Secretary for Education and Culture	Mohammed Ben Abdallah	1986	1987	
Secretary for Education and Culture	K. B. Asante	1988	1989	
Secretary for Education and Culture	Mary Grant	1989	1993	
Secretary for Agriculture	Eugene Bortei-Doku	January 1982	Dec 1983	
Secretary for Agriculture	John Akparibo Ndebugre	1984	1985	
Secretary for Agriculture	Isaac Adjei-Marfo	1985	1986	
Secretary for Agriculture	Stephen Obimpeh	1986	1992	
Secretary for Agriculture	Ibrahim Adam	1992	1993	
Secretary for Cocoa Affairs	Isaac Adjei-Marfo	?	?	
Secretary for Chieftaincy Affairs	E.G. Tanoh	1987	1992	
Secretary for Chieftaincy Affairs	Nana Akuoko Sarpong	1992	1993	
Secretary for Trade; Secretary for Trade and Tourism	K. B. Asante	January 1982	1986	
Secretary for Trade; Secretary for Trade and Tourism	Kofi Djin	1986	1992	
Secretary for Trade; Secretary for Trade and Tourism	John Bawa	1992	1993	
Secretary for Culture and Tourism	Asiedu Yirenkyi	January 1982	1984	
Secretary for Culture and Tourism	Mohammed Ben Abdallah	?	1986	
Secretary for Local Government and Rural Development	John Agyekum Kufuor	January 1982	1982	
Secretary for Local Government and Rural Development	Kwame Dwemoh-Kesse	1983	?	
Secretary for Local Government and Rural Development	William H. Yeboah	1986	?	
Secretary for Local Government and Rural Development	Kofi Acquaah Harrison	c. 1986	?	
Secretary for Local Government and Rural Development	Joyce Aryee	1986	1988	
Secretary for Local Government and Rural Development	Kwamena Ahwoi	?	?	
Secretary for Rural Development and Co-operatives	Kofi Ankomah	January 1982	1982	
Secretary for Rural Development and Co-operatives	Kofi Acquaah Harrison	1982	1986	
Secretary for Fuel and Power	E. Appiah Korang	January 1982	1987	
Secretary for Fuel and Power	Ato Ahwoi	1987	1993	
Secretary for Transport and Communications	Mahama Iddrisu	January 1982	1986	
Secretary for Transport and Communications	Kwame M. Peprah	1986	1987	
Secretary for Transport and Communications	Yaw Donkor	1987	1992	
Secretary for Transport and Communications	Kwame M. Peprah	1992	1993	
Secretary for Roads and Highways	Dr. E. G. A. Don-Arthur	1982	1983	
Secretary for Roads and Highways	Yaw E. O. Donkor	1983	1987	
Secretary for Roads and Highways	Mensah Gbedemah	1987	1992	
Secretary for Roads and Highways	Richard Commey	1992	1993	
Secretary for Lands and Natural Resources	Kwesi Renner	1983	1986	
Secretary for Lands and Natural Resources	George Adamu	1986	1987	
Secretary for Lands and Natural Resources	Kwame Peprah	1987	1992	
Secretary for Lands and Natural Resources	J. A. Dansoh	1992	1993	
Secretary for Industry, Science and Technology	Kaku Kyiamah	January 1982	1983	
Secretary for Industry, Science and Technology	G. B. Opoku	1983	1986	
Secretary for Industry, Science and Technology	Francis Acquah	1986	1992	
Secretary for Industry, Science and Technology	K. A. Butah	1992	1993	
Secretary for Information	Ato Austin	January 1982	1983	
Secretary for Information	Joyce Aryee	1983	1985	
Secretary for Information	Kofi Totobi Quakyi	1985	1993	
Secretary for Health	Charles Buadu	1983	1986	
Secretary for Health	E. G. Tanoh	c. 1986	?	
Secretary for Health	Air Commodore F. W. Klutse	1986	1988	
Secretary for Health	Nana Akuoko Sarpong	1988	1991	
Secretary for Health	Stephen Obimpeh	1992	1993	
Secretary for Labour and Social Welfare; Secretary for Mobilization and Productivity	Adisa Munkaila	1982	1983	
Secretary for Labour and Social Welfare; Secretary for Mobilization and Productivity	Ato Austin	1983	1986	
Secretary for Labour and Social Welfare; Secretary for Mobilization and Productivity	W. H. Yeboah	1986	1987	
Secretary for Labour and Social Welfare; Secretary for Mobilization and Productivity	Huudu Yahaya	c. 1988	?	
Secretary for Labour and Social Welfare; Secretary for Mobilization and Productivity	George Adamu	?	1992	
Secretary for Labour and Social Welfare; Secretary for Mobilization and Productivity	D. S. Boateng	1992	1993	
Secretary for Works and Housing	Dr. E. G. A. Don-Arthur	1983		
Secretary for Works and Housing	Mawuse Dake	January 1982	1983	
Secretary for Works and Housing	Alhassan Abubakar	1983	?	
Secretary for Works and Housing	Kofi Sam	c. 1986	?	
Secretary for Works and Housing	Emmanuel Appiah Korang			
Secretary for Works and Housing	Kenneth Ampratwum			
Secretary Responsible For International Economic Cooperation	Dr. E. G. A. Don-Arthur	1986	1990	
Secretary for Youth and Sports	Zaya Yeebo	January 1982	1983	
Secretary for Youth and Sports	Amarkai Amarteifio	1983	1986	
Secretary for Youth and Sports	Ato Austin	1986	1988	
Secretary for Youth and Sports	Kwame Saarah-Mensah	1988	1992	
Secretary for Youth and Sports	Arnold Quainoo	1992	1993	
National Defence Committee	Mawuse Dake	1983	?	
PDCs and WDCs	Akrasi-Sarpong	c. 1983	?	
Regional Secretaries
Ashanti Regional Secretary	J. Y. Ansah	?	?	
Ashanti Regional Secretary	F. A. Jantuah	1983	?	
Ashanti Regional Secretary	Colonel Osei Owusu	c. 1986		
Brong Ahafo Region	K. Saarah-Mensah	January 1982	1982	
Brong Ahafo Region	J. H. Owusu Acheampong	1982	?	
Brong Ahafo Region	C. S. Takyi	1983	?	
Brong Ahafo Region	Colonel Alex Antwi	c. 1986		
Central Regional Secretary	Dr. E. G. A. Don-Arthur	1986		
Central Regional Secretary	E. G. Tanoh	1983	?	
Central Regional Secretary	Ato Austin	1988	1993	
Central Regional Secretary	Lt. Colonel E. A. Baidoo	c. 1986		
Eastern Regional Secretary	Fred Ohene-Kena	1982	?	
Eastern Regional Secretary	Daniel O. Agyekum	?	1986	
Eastern Regional Secretary	Kofi Acquaah Harrison	1986	?	
Greater Accra Regional Secretary	Atukwei Okai	January 1982	1982	
Greater Accra Regional Secretary	Nii Abeo Kyerekuandah	1983	?	
Greater Accra Regional Secretary	Nii Okaidja Adamafio	1982	?	
Greater Accra Regional Secretary	Colonel W. A. Thompson	1985	1986	
Greater Accra Regional Secretary	Selina Taylor	c. 1986		
Greater Accra Regional Secretary	Colonel W. A. Thompson	1988	1991	
Greater Accra Regional Secretary	Nii Okaidja Adamafio	1991	?	
Northern Regional Secretary	Thomas Ibrahim	1982	?	
Northern Regional Secretary	D. S. Zachariah	c. 1986		
Upper East Region	Kundab Mobilla	1982	?	
Upper East Region	J. E. Sakyi	c. 1986		
Upper West Region	Yelibora Antumini	1982	1983	
Upper West Region	Joseph Yieleh Chireh	1983	?	
Volta Regional Secretary	Francis Agbley	1982	?	
Volta Regional Secretary	Yao Fiagbe	c. 1982		
Volta Regional Secretary	Richard Seglah	c. 1986		
Western Region	J. R. E. Amenlema	1982	?	
Western Region	Dr. E. G. A. Don-Arthur	1983	1986	
Western Region	Colonel W. A. Thompson	1986	1988	

Preceded by Limann government (1979–1981)	Government of Ghana (Military Regime); Dec 1981 – Jan 1993	Succeeded by Rawlings government (1993–2001)
