= Hilla Limann =

President of Ghana from 1979 to 1981

Hilla Limann GCMG
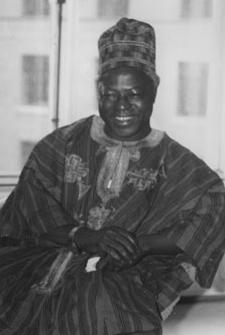
- Limann in 1981

8th President of Ghana
- In office 24 September 1979 – 31 December 1981
- Vice President: Joseph W.S. de-Graft Johnson
- Preceded by: Jerry Rawlings (as Head of State)
- Succeeded by: Jerry Rawlings (as Head of State)

Personal details
- Born: Hilla Babini; 12 December 1934 Gwollu, Gold Coast
- Died: 23 January 1998 (aged 63) Accra, Ghana
- Party: People's National Party
- Spouse: Fulera Limann
- Education: London School of Economics; University of London (BA); Sorbonne University (Dipl.); University of Paris (PhD)

Hilla Limann, GCMG (12 December 1934 – 23 January 1998) was a Ghanaian diplomat and politician who served as the eighth president of Ghana from 1979 to 1981. He previously served as a diplomat in Lomé and in Geneva.

== Education ==
Limann, whose original last name was Babini, was born in the northern Gold Coast town of Gwollu in the Sissala West District of the Upper West Region. Limann completed his basic school education at the Government Middle School, Tamale, in 1949. Between 1957 and 1960, he studied political science at the London School of Economics. He subsequently completed a diploma in French at the Sorbonne University, France. He also obtained a BA (Hons) degree in history at the University of London and a Ph.D. in political science and constitutional law at the University of Paris.

== Foreign service ==
Limann held the position of head of Europe Desk at the Ministry of Foreign Affairs of Ghana between 1965 and 1968. During 1967, he was a member of the Constitution Commission which drafted the 1969 Constitution of Ghana. In 1968, he became the head of Chancery/Official Secretary at the Ghana embassy in Lomé, Togo. He was appointed counsellor at Ghana's Permanent Mission in Geneva, Switzerland in 1971. He assumed the position of head of Europe, Americas, and Southeast Asia Desk back in Ghana at the Ministry of Foreign Affairs in June 1975.

== Politics ==
Following the 1979 coup led by Jerry Rawlings, Limann was elected President on the People's National Party ticket and had strong support among followers of former Ghana President Kwame Nkrumah. He stood for the elections following the disqualification of Alhaji Imoru Egala by the then ruling Supreme Military Council and won 62% of the popular vote in the second round of voting.

Dr. Limann assumed office as president on 24 September 1979. He was an economic moderate, and supported democratic values and Pan-Africanism. He was deposed in a coup by Rawlings on 31 December 1981. He thus was the only president of the third republic of Ghana.

In 1992, at the end of the PNDC military rule that overthrew him, Dr. Limann once again found himself involved in politics and stood as the candidate of the People's National Convention, a new party he founded, in the presidential election that year. He received 6.7% of the popular vote in the elections, coming third. He remained active among the Nkrumahist political movement in Ghana until his death.

== Addendum ==
After the handover ceremony in 1979, Military intelligence personnel consistently reported destabilising activities of former members of the AFRC. Dr. Limman insisted that there were no legal justifications to hold them in custody under a democratic dispensation. This decision eventually cost him the presidency and the years of humiliation and alienation he suffered at the hands of the Rawlings administration.

== Death and burial ==
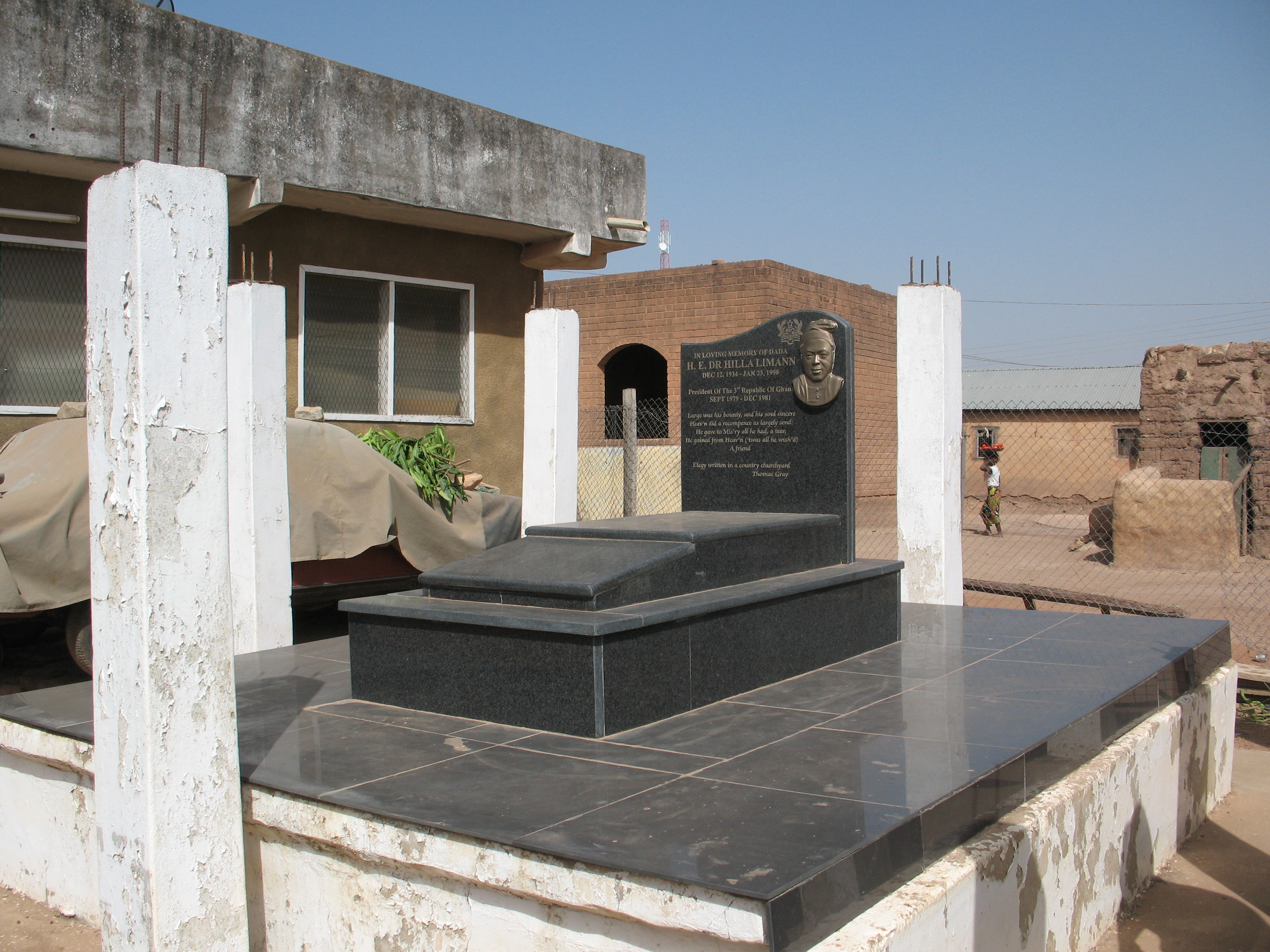
Limann's tomb in Gwollu

Limann had chronic health problems and later died of natural causes. He was survived by his wife, Fulera Limann, and seven children: Lariba Montia (née Limann), Baba Limann, Sibi Andan (née Limann), Lida Limann, Daani Limann, Zilla Limann and Salma Limann. He was buried at private burial ceremony in his home town, Gwollu in the Sisala District of the Upper West Region at midnight on 1 March 1998. A government delegation led by the then Minister of Defence, Alhaji Mahama Iddrisu were present to mourn with the family.

== Hilla Limann Foundation ==
The Hilla Limann Foundation is a charity that was launched on the commemoration of the 40th anniversary of his presidency in September 2019. Its aims are to end the abuse of human rights through education, championing the cause of human development for the poor and vulnerable, engender enlightenment about true democracy and promote the awareness of human rights.

== Honours ==
Limann was honoured with the Knight Grand Cross of St Michael and St George by Elizabeth II, Queen of the United Kingdom in 1981. The same year, he was awarded the Order of the Yugoslav Great Star.

== See also ==
- Limann government

Political offices
Preceded by Jerry Rawlings; Military Head of state	President of Ghana; 1979 – 1981	Succeeded by Jerry Rawlings; Military Head of state
Party political offices
First	People's National Party presidential candidate 1979	Parties banned
First	People's National Convention presidential candidate 1992	Succeeded by Edward Mahama
