= People's National Party (Ghana) =

Left-wing ruling party of Ghana from 1979 to 1981

- Leader: Hilla Limann
- Founder: Imoru Egala
- Founded: 1979; 47 years ago
- Dissolved: December 31, 1981; 44 years ago
- Preceded by: Convention People's Party
- Succeeded by: People's National Convention; Convention People's Party
- Ideology: Nkrumaism; Socialism; Pan-Africanism
- Political position: Left-wing
- Slogan: Eye Abe
- 1979 National Assembly Election: 71 / 140

The People's National Party (PNP) was the ruling party in Ghana during the Third Republic (1979–1981). It was disbanded following the 1981 Ghanaian coup d'état.

All political parties in Ghana were disbanded following the January 1972 military coup led by Col. Ignatius Kutu Acheampong. When political activities resumed in 1979, there were five parties contesting the elections. The PNP claimed to represent the Nkrumah heritage.

In elections held on 18 June 1979, PNP presidential candidate Hilla Limann won 35.3% of the vote and the party won 71 of 140 seats in the National Assembly. Limann won 62% of the vote in a 9 July run-off against Victor Owusu of the Popular Front Party (PFP). He took office as President of Ghana on 24 September 1979.

Preceded by Armed Forces Revolutionary Council	Governments of Ghana; Third Republic; 1979–1981	Succeeded by Provisional National Defence Council
