= Chief of Army Staff (Ghana) =

Professional head of the Ghana Army

Chief of the Army Staff
- Incumbent; Major General Lawrence Kwaku Gbetanu since 24 March 2025
- Ghana Army
- Member of: the Defence Staff
- Reports to: Chief of the Defence Staff
- Appointer: President of Ghana in consultation with the Council of State of Ghana
- Term length: No fixed length

The Chief of Army Staff is the title of the professional head of the Ghana Army. The head of the Army was formerly referred to as the army commander. The current Chief of Army Staff is Major General Lawrence Kwaku Gbetanu. He was appointed to the position by President John Dramani Mahama on 24 March 2025.

== List of Chiefs of Army Staff ==
No.	Portrait	Chief of Army Staff	Took office	Left office	Time in office	Ref.
1	D. H. Tadman	Brigadier; D. H. Tadman as Brigade Commander	?	1959	?	.
2	Alexander George Victor Paley	Brigadier; Alexander George Victor Paley (1903–1976) as Army Commander	1959	11 January 1960	0–1 years	.
3	Henry Templer Alexander	Major General; Henry Templer Alexander (1911–1977) as Combined CDS and Army Commander	11 January 1960	December 1961	1 year, 10 months	.
4	Joseph Arthur Ankrah	Brigadier; Joseph Arthur Ankrah (1915–1992)	December 1961	October 1962	10 months	
5	Stephen Otu	Major general Stephen Otu (1915–1979)	October 1962	July 1965	2 years, 9 months	
6	C. M. Barwah	Brigadier; C. M. Barwah (1929–1966)	July 1965	February 1966 †	7 months	
7	Albert Kwesi Ocran	Brigadier; Albert Kwesi Ocran (1929–2019)	February 1966	August 1966	7 months	
8	Clelend Cofie Bruce	Major general Clelend Cofie Bruce	August 1966	May 1967	8 months	
(7)	Albert Kwesi Ocran	Major general Albert Kwesi Ocran (1929–2019)	May 1967	November 1968	1 year, 6 months	
9	D. C. K. Amenu	Brigadier; D. C. K. Amenu	November 1968	August 1969	9 months	
10	Daniel K. Addo	Major General; Daniel K. Addo	August 1969	June 1971	1 year, 10 months	
11	J. R. K. Acquah	Brigadier; J. R. K. Acquah	June 1971	October 1971	4 months	
12	H. D. Twum-Barimah	Brigadier; H. D. Twum-Barimah	October 1971	January 1972	3 months	
13	Emmanuel Alexander Erskine	Colonel; Emmanuel Alexander Erskine (1935–2021)	January 1972	February 1972	1 month	
14	D. A. Asare	Brigadier; D. A. Asare	February 1972	January 1973	11 months	
(13)	Emmanuel Alexander Erskine	Brigadier; Emmanuel Alexander Erskine (1935–2021)	February 1973	April 1974	1 year, 2 months	
15	Fred Akuffo	Brigadier; Fred Akuffo (1937–1979)	May 1974	November 1976	2 years, 6 months	
16	Robert Kotei	Major general Robert Kotei (1935–1979)	November 1976	July 1978	1 year, 8 months	
17	Neville Alexander Odartey-Wellington	Major general Neville Alexander Odartey-Wellington (1934–1979)	July 1978	4 June 1979 †	11 months	
18	W. W. Bruce-Konuah	Colonel; W. W. Bruce-Konuah (1941–2011)	6 June 1979	July 1979	0 months	
19	Arnold Quainoo	Brigadier; Arnold Quainoo	July 1979	November 1979	4 months	
20	I. K. Amoah	Brigadier; I. K. Amoah	November 1979	December 1981	2 years, 1 month	
(19)	Arnold Quainoo	Major general Arnold Quainoo	January 1982	June 1987	5 years, 5 months	
21	W.M. Mensah-Wood	Major general W.M. Mensah-Wood	June 1987	June 1990	3 years	
22	Ben Akafia	Major general Ben Akafia (born 1940)	June 1990	September 1996	6 years, 3 months	
23	Joseph Henry Smith	Major general Joseph Henry Smith (1945–2023)	October 1996	February 2001	4 years, 4 months	
24	Clayton Yaache	Major general Clayton Yaache	February 2001	20 May 2005	4 years, 3 months	
25	Samuel Odotei	Major general Samuel Odotei	20 May 2005	31 March 2009	3 years, 10 months	
26	Joseph Narh Adinkra	Major general Joseph Narh Adinkra	31 March 2009	4 April 2013	4 years	
27	Richard Opoku-Adusei	Major general Richard Opoku-Adusei	4 April 2013	1 July 2016	3 years, 2 months	
28	Obed Akwa	Major general Obed Akwa (born 1955)	1 July 2016	9 February 2017	7 months	
29	William Azure Ayamdo	Major General; William Azure Ayamdo	9 February 2017	18 February 2020	3 years	.
30	Thomas Oppong-Peprah	Major General; Thomas Oppong-Peprah	18 February 2020	31 January 2024	6 years, 6 months	.
31	Bismarck Kwasi Onwona	Lieutenant General; Bismarck Kwasi Onwona	1 February 2024	24 March 2025	1 year, 1 month	
32	Lawrence Kwaku Gbetanu	Major General; Lawrence Kwaku Gbetanu	24 March 2025	Incumbent	1 year, 5 months	
