= Joseph Edward Michel =

Ghanaian soldier

- Born: 27 May 1917; Gold Coast
- Died: 3 September 1961 (aged 44); Kumasi, Ghana
- Burial place: Osu, Accra
- Spouse: Victoria Kordei Tettey
- Children: 3
- Military career
- Allegiance: Ghana
- Branch: Ghana Army
- Service years: 1943 to 1961
- Rank: Brigadier
- Memorials: Michel Camp

Brigadier Joseph Edward Michel (1917-1961) was a Ghanaian soldier. He was one of the early commissioned officers in the Ghana Army.

== Early life and education ==
Michel was the son of Alexander Michel, a French Trader at Tarkwa and Afua his wife who hailed from Atikpui near Ho. He received his education at the Ewe Presbyterian Boarding School at Amedzofe and continued at the Presbyterian Training College at Akropong where he qualified as a teacher.

== Career ==
Joseph Michel initially taught at the Kpando Presbyterian Senior School. On 4 August 1943, he joined the colonial army at Ho in the Volta Region via the school teachers' special enlistment programme. He started as a"local" sergeant. He was initially a schoolmaster / instructor in the army. He was appointed full sergeant in January 1945.

Michel was commissioned as a second lieutenant in April 1947. He was promoted a lieutenant in with effect from 27 November 1947. He was appointed platoon commander at Kumasi. He attended a Platoon Commander's Tactical course at Warminster in the United Kingdom in relation to his appointment. Between 1948 and 1950, he was the second-in-charge of the Gold Coast Regiment Training Centre (GCR Training Centre) at Kumasi. In 1950, he attended the Company Commanders' Course 67/50 at the School of Infantry, Warminster. He returned to the GCR Training Centre where he was promoted to rank of captain. He was made the Company Commander of the GCR Training Centre in April 1951.

He was transferred in July 1951 to the 3rd Battalion of the GRC. In August 1952, he was transferred again to the First Battalion of the RTC at Kumasi. In January 1953, he was transferred again to the Boys' Company as the Commanding Officer.

Michel was promoted to the rank of major in May 1953. Brigadier Alexander G. V. Paley, who was then Head of the Gold Coast Army, in a response to a report recommending his promotion wrote:

"He is loyal to his immediate superiors and is obedient both to orders and to the wishes they express. I agree that he should be fit for promotion - though not yet."

In February 1956, Michel was posted to the Second Gold Coast Regiment in Accra. He was cleared by the Medical Board in July 1956 and he was nominated for Staff College which he attended during 1957 at Camberley, United Kingdom. His final report mentioned that he was:

"An intelligent and shrewd officer with a pleasant personality who has entered fully into staff college life and made many friends. He is most conscientious and works well in a team. Although he has been prone to listen and learn rather than put forward his own views, he has shown that he possesses much sound common sense and a very fair military background. He should make a useful reliable staff officer in his own country."

In February 1958, he was posted to the Second Ghana Regiment and later moved to the Headquarters of the Ghana Army. In 1959, he was promoted to lieutenant colonel along with Major S. J. A. Otu and Major J. A. Ankrah. He then assumed command of the Second Ghana Regiment in November 1959. Lt. Colonel Gilmour, the Chief of General Staff at the Ghana Army Headquarters rated his work at Army headquarters very highly. Brigadier G. H. Tadman, Commanding Officer of the Infantry Brigade at the time rated him as the "beset Ghanaian officer of his rank in the army." Major General Paley, now General Officer Commanding the Ghana Army agreed with the assessment.

Following the April 1960 plebiscite on a republican constitution, Michel was selected to become the aide-de-camp of President Kwame Nkrumah. He and Brigadier S. J. A. Otu were the most senior African officers in the Ghana Army at the time.

== Duties outside Ghana ==
Michel was selected as part of the military contingent from the Gold Coast to attend the coronation of Queen Elizabeth II in London in 1962.

=== Equerry to Queen Elizabeth II ===
In 1959, Michel was selected to be Equerry to Queen Elizabeth II. He was based at Buckingham Palace and accompanied the queen and Prince Philip on her 17 days tour of Ghana, Sierra Leone and The Gambia.

=== United Nations Operation in the Congo ===
Following the request of the United Nations for Ghanaian troops in the Congo (Leopoldville), Michel was chosen to lead the Ghanaian contingent. In July 1960, he was appointed the A - Brigade Commander in Léopoldville. He was posted to Brigade Headquarters in Léopoldville in August 1960. Major General H. T. Alexander was impressed with his smooth transition from commanding a battalion in Ghana to commanding a brigade within the United Nations Operation in the Congo with such success. In June 1961, it was announced that President Nkrumah had agreed to second Michel to the United Nations as the Chief of Staff of the United Nations Forces in Congo. This was opposed by Major General Alexander who felt that with only a few Ghanaian senior army officers available, it was better to keep Michel within the army command than to release him for staff work with the United Nations. He suggested sending Colonel Ankrah or Lt. Colonel Aferi instead. He lobbied Mr Dadzie, Head of the Ghana Mission at the United Nations in New York City. The Force Commander of the UNOC was also keen for him to start and a compromise was reached for a start date of 20 September 1961. Unfortunately, he did not live to take up this appointment.

== Diabetes ==
He also developed diabetes in 1951 and this raised questions about his fitness to continue in the military. Brigadier Paley raised these concerns in discussion with other officers in 1953 when his progress in the army was discussed.

== Death ==
On 3 September 1961, Michel died following injuries he sustained in an air crash at Kumasi, Ghana. He was buried at the Christiansborg military cemetery at Osu, Accra on 5 September 1961. He was survived by his wife, a biological daughter (Georgina) and two other adopted children.

== Honours ==
The Michel Camp of the Ghana Armed Forces near Tema is named after him in honour of his achievements during his short life in the Ghana military.

== See also ==
- Nathan Apea Aferi
- Joseph Arthur Ankrah
- Stephen Otu

== External source ==
- Amenumey, D. E. K. (2002). "10". Outstanding Ewes of the 20th Century: Profiles of Fifteen Firsts. Volume 1. Accra: Woeli Publishing Services. pp. 115–129. ISBN 9964-978-83-9.
