= List of Commonwealth infantry regiments =

== 0–9 ==
- 1st Commando Regiment
- 1st Gorkha Rifles (The Malaun Regiment)
- 1st Regiment, Armed Forces of Malta
- 11th Gorkha Rifles
- 3rd Gorkha Rifles
- 4th Gorkha Rifles
- 4 Special Forces Regiment
- 44 Parachute Regiment
- 48th Highlanders of Canada
- 5th Gorkha Rifles (Frontier Force)
- 5 Special Forces Regiment
- 8th Gorkha Rifles
- 9th Gorkha Rifles

== A ==
- A Company, SKNDF
- Algonquin Regiment (Northern Pioneers)
- Antigua and Barbuda Regiment
- Argyll and Sutherland Highlanders of Canada (Princess Louise's)
- Assam Regiment
- Auckland (Countess of Ranfurly's Own) and Northland Regiment
- Auckland Infantry Regiment
- Azad Kashmir Regiment

== B ==
- B Company, SKNDF
- Baloch Regiment
- Bangladesh Infantry Regiment
- Barbados Regiment
- Bermuda Regiment
- Bihar Regiment
- Black Watch (Royal Highland Regiment) of Canada
- Brigade of the Guards
- Brockville Rifles

== C ==
- Calgary Highlanders (10th Canadians)
- Cameron Highlanders of Ottawa (Duke of Edinburgh's Own)
- Canadian Grenadier Guards
- Canadian Scottish Regiment (Princess Mary's)
- Canterbury, and Nelson-Marlborough and West Coast Regiment
- Canterbury Infantry Regiment
- Cape Breton Highlanders
- Cape Town Highlanders
- Coldstream Guards
- Commando Regiment
- Cyprus Regiment

== D ==
- Dogra Regiment
- Duke of Lancaster's Regiment (King's Lancashire and Border)
- Durban Light Infantry

== E ==
- East Bengal Regiment
- Essex and Kent Scottish Regiment

== F ==
- Far North Queensland Regiment
- Fiji Infantry Regiment
- Frontier Force Regiment
- Les Fusiliers Mont-Royal
- Les Fusiliers du S^{t}-Laurent
- Les Fusiliers de Sherbrooke

== G ==
- Gajaba Regiment
- Gemunu Watch
- Garhwal Rifles
- Ghana Regiment
- Governor General's Foot Guards
- Grenadier Guards
- The Grenadiers
- Grey and Simcoe Foresters

== H ==
- Hastings and Prince Edward Regiment
- Hauraki Regiment
- Hawke's Bay Regiment

== I ==
- Irish Guards
- Irish Regiment of Canada

== J ==
- Jamaica Regiment
- Jammu and Kashmir Light Infantry
- Jammu and Kashmir Rifles
- Jat Regiment

== K ==
- Kaffrarian Rifles
- Kenya Rifles
- Kimberley Regiment
- Kumaon Regiment

== L ==
- Lake Superior Scottish Regiment
- Lincoln and Welland Regiment
- London Regiment (disambiguation)
- Lorne Scots (Peel, Dufferin and Halton Regiment)
- Loyal Edmonton Regiment (4th Bn PPCLI)

== M ==
- Madras Regiment
- Mahar Regiment
- Malawi Rifles
- Maratha Light Infantry
- Mechanised Infantry Regiment
- Mercian Regiment

== N ==
- Naga Regiment
- Natal Carbineers
- New Zealand Rifle Brigade
- New Zealand Scottish Regiment
- New Zealand Special Air Service
- Nigeria Regiment
- Nigerian Guards Brigade
- NORFORCE
- North Saskatchewan Regiment
- North Shore (New Brunswick) Regiment
- Northern Light Infantry
- Nova Scotia Highlanders

== O ==
- Otago and Southland Regiment
- Otago Infantry Regiment

== P ==
- Parachute Regiment
- Parachute Regiment
- Pilbara Regiment
- President's Own Guard Regiment
- Prince Alfred's Guard
- Princess Louise Fusiliers
- Princess of Wales's Own Regiment
- Princess of Wales's Royal Regiment (Queen's and Royal Hampshires)
- Princess Patricia's Canadian Light Infantry
- Punjab Regiment
- Punjab Regiment

== Q ==
- The Queen's Own Cameron Highlanders of Canada
- Queen's Own Rifles of Canada

== R ==
- Rajput Regiment
- Rajputana Rifles
- Rand Light Infantry
- Rejimen Askar Melayu DiRaja
- Rejimen Renjer DiRaja
- Le Régiment de la Chaudière
- Le Régiment de Maisonneuve
- Le Régiment du Saguenay
- The Rifles
- Rocky Mountain Rangers
- Le Royal 22^{e} Régiment
- Royal Anglian Regiment
- Royal Australian Regiment
- The Royal Canadian Regiment
- Royal Gibraltar Regiment
- Royal Gurkha Rifles
- Royal Hamilton Light Infantry (Wentworth Regiment)
- Royal Highland Fusiliers of Canada
- The Royal Hong Kong Regiment (Volunteers)
- The Royal Irish Regiment (27th (Inniskilling) 83rd and 87th and The Ulster Defence Regiment)
- Royal Irish Rangers
- Royal Montreal Regiment
- Royal New Brunswick Regiment (Carleton and York)
- Royal New South Wales Regiment
- Royal New Zealand Infantry Regiment
- Royal Newfoundland Regiment
- Royal Pacific Islands Regiment
- Royal Queensland Regiment
- Royal Regiment of Canada
- Royal Regiment of Fusiliers
- Royal Regiment of Scotland
- Royal Regina Rifles
- Royal South Australia Regiment
- Royal Tasmania Regiment
- Royal Victoria Regiment
- Royal Welsh
- Royal Western Australia Regiment
- Royal Westminster Regiment
- Royal Winnipeg Rifles
- Ruahine Regiment

== S ==
- Scots Guards
- Seaforth Highlanders of Canada
- Sikh Light Infantry
- Sikh Regiment
- Sindh Regiment
- Singapore Guards
- Singapore Infantry Regiment
- South African Irish Regiment
- Special Air Service
- Special Air Service Regiment
- Sri Lanka Army Special Forces Regiment
- Special Service Group
- Sri Lanka Light Infantry
- Sri Lanka Sinha Regiment
- Stormont, Dundas and Glengarry Highlanders

== T ==
- Taranaki Regiment
- Toronto Scottish Regiment (Queen Elizabeth The Queen Mother's Own)
- Transvaal Scottish Regiment
- Trinidad and Tobago Regiment

== U ==
- Uganda Rifles

== V ==
- Vijayabahu Infantry Regiment
- Les Voltigeurs de Québec

== W ==
- Welsh Guards
- Wellington Regiment (City of Wellington's Own)
- Wellington (City of Wellington's Own) and Hawke's Bay Regiment
- Wellington Infantry Regiment
- Wellington West Coast and Taranaki Regiment
- West Nova Scotia Regiment
- Witwatersrand Rifles Regiment

== Y ==
- Yorkshire Regiment (14th/15th, 19th & 33rd/76th Foot)

== Z ==
- Zambia Regiment

== See also ==
- List of Commonwealth Armoured Regiments
