= List of Commonwealth armoured regiments =

The following is a list of Commonwealth armoured regiments. The Commonwealth of Nations, normally referred to as the Commonwealth, is an intergovernmental organisation of 54 independent member states, or Commonwealth countries. Almost all were part of the British Empire, out of which the Commonwealth developed.

- 1
  - 1 South African Tank Regiment
  - 1 Special Service Battalion
  - 1st Armoured Regiment
  - 1st Hussars
  - 1st Queen's Dragoon Guards
  - 1st/15th Royal New South Wales Lancers
  - 6th DCO's Lancers
  - 10th Armoured Regiment
  - 10th Light Horse Regiment
  - 11th Armoured Regiment
  - 11th King Edward's Own Lancers (Probyn's Horse)
  - 12^{e} Régiment blindé du Canada
  - 12th Armoured Regiment
  - 12th Cavalry
  - 12th/16th Hunter River Lancers
  - 13th Armoured Regiment
  - 13th Lancers
  - 15th Armoured Regiment
  - 15th Lancers
  - 16th Cavalry
  - 18th Cavalry
  - 19th Armoured Regiment
  - 19th KGO's Lancers
- 2
  - 2nd Cavalry Regiment
  - 2nd Lancers
  - 2nd/14th Light Horse Regiment (Queensland Mounted Infantry)
  - 20th Lancers
  - 20th Lancers
  - 22nd Cavalry
  - 23rd Cavalry
  - 24th Cavalry
  - 25th Cavalry
  - 26th Cavalry
  - 27th Cavalry
  - 28th Cavalry
  - 29th Cavalry
- 3
  - 3rd Cavalry
  - 3rd/4th Cavalry Regiment
  - 3rd/9th South Australia Mounted Rifles
  - 30th Cavalry
  - 31st Duke of Connaught's Own Lancers
  - 32nd Cavalry
  - 33rd Cavalry
- 4
  - 4th Armoured Regiment
  - 4th Cavalry
  - 4th Horse
  - 4th Waikato Mounted Rifles
  - 4th/9th Prince of Wales' Light Horse
  - 40th Armoured Regiment
  - 40th Cavalry
  - 41st Armoured Regiment
  - 41st Horse
  - 42nd Armoured Regiment
  - 42 Armoured Regiment (India)
  - 42nd Cavalry Regiment
  - 43rd Armoured Regiment
  - 43rd Cavalry
  - 44th Armoured Regiment
  - 45th Armoured Regiment
  - 46th Armoured Regiment
  - 47th Armoured Regiment
  - 48th Armoured Regiment
  - 49th Armoured Regiment
- 5
  - 5th Armoured Regiment
  - 5th Horse
  - 50th Armoured Regiment
  - 50th Cavalry
  - 51st Armoured Regiment
  - 51st Cavalry
  - 52nd Armoured Regiment
  - 52nd Cavalry
  - 53rd Armoured Regiment
  - 53rd Cavalry
- 6
  - 6th Armoured Regiment
  - 6th Lancers (DCO's)
  - 61st Cavalry
  - 62nd Cavalry
  - 63rd Cavalry
  - 64th Cavalry
  - 65th Armoured Regiment
  - 66th Armoured Regiment
  - 67th Armoured Regiment
  - 68th Armoured Regiment
  - 69th Armoured Regiment
- 7
  - 7th Lancers
  - 7th Light Cavalry
  - 70th Armoured Regiment
  - 71st Armoured Regiment
  - 72nd Armoured Regiment
  - 73rd Armoured Regiment
  - 74th Armoured Regiment
  - 75th Armoured Regiment
  - 76th Armoured Regiment
- 8
  - 8th Canadian Hussars (Princess Louise's)
  - 8th Lancers
  - 8th Light Cavalry
  - 81st Armoured Regiment
  - 82nd Armoured Regiment
  - 83rd Armoured Regiment
  - 84th Armoured Regiment
  - 85th Armoured Regiment
  - 86th Armoured Regiment
  - 87th Armoured Regiment
  - 88th Armoured Regiment
  - 89th Armoured Regiment
- 9
  - 9th Lancers
  - 9th/12th Royal Lancers (Prince of Wales's)
  - 90th Armoured Regiment
- A
  - Armour Troop, Service and Support Platoon, SKNDF
- B
  - British Columbia Dragoons
  - British Columbia Regiment (Duke of Connaught's Own)
- C
  - Central India Horse
- D
  - Deccan Horse
- E
- F
  - Fort Garry Horse
- G
  - Governor General's Horse Guards
  - Guides Cavalry FF
- H
  - Halifax Rifles (RCAC)
  - Household Cavalry Regiment
- K
  - King's Own Calgary Regiment (RCAC)
  - King's Royal Hussars
  - Kor Armour DiRaja
- L
  - Le Régiment de Hull (RCAC)
  - Light Dragoons
  - Johannesburg Light Horse Regiment
  - Lord Strathcona's Horse (Royal Canadians)
- N
  - Queen Nandi Mounted Rifles
  - New Zealand Scottish Regiment
- O
  - Ontario Regiment (RCAC)
- P
  - PAVO (11th) Cavalry FF
  - Poona Horse
  - President's Bodyguard
  - President's Bodyguard
  - Pretoria Armoured Regiment
  - Prince Edward Island Regiment (RCAC)
  - Probyn's Horse
- Q
  - Queen Alexandra's Mounted Rifles
  - Queen's Own Yeomanry
  - Queen's Royal Hussars (Queen's Own and Royal Irish)
  - Queen's Royal Lancers
  - Queen's York Rangers (1st American Regiment) (RCAC)
- R
  - Reconnaissance Regiment
  - Molapo Armoured Regiment
  - laauwberg Armoured Regiment
  - Thaba Bosiu Armoured Regiment
  - Rhodesian Armoured Corps
  - Royal Canadian Dragoons
  - Royal Canadian Hussars (Montreal)
  - Royal Dragoon Guards
  - Royal Mercian and Lancastrian Yeomanry
  - Royal Scots Dragoon Guards
  - Royal Tank Regiment
  - Royal Wessex Yeomanry
  - Royal Yeomanry
- S
  - Saskatchewan Dragoons
  - Scinde Horse
  - Sherbrooke Hussars
  - Singapore Armoured Regiment
  - Skinner's Horse
  - South Alberta Light Horse
- U
  - Umvoti Mounted Rifles
- W
  - Windsor Regiment (RCAC)

== See also ==
- List of Commonwealth infantry regiments
