= Obed Akwa =

Ghanaian military officer (born 1955)

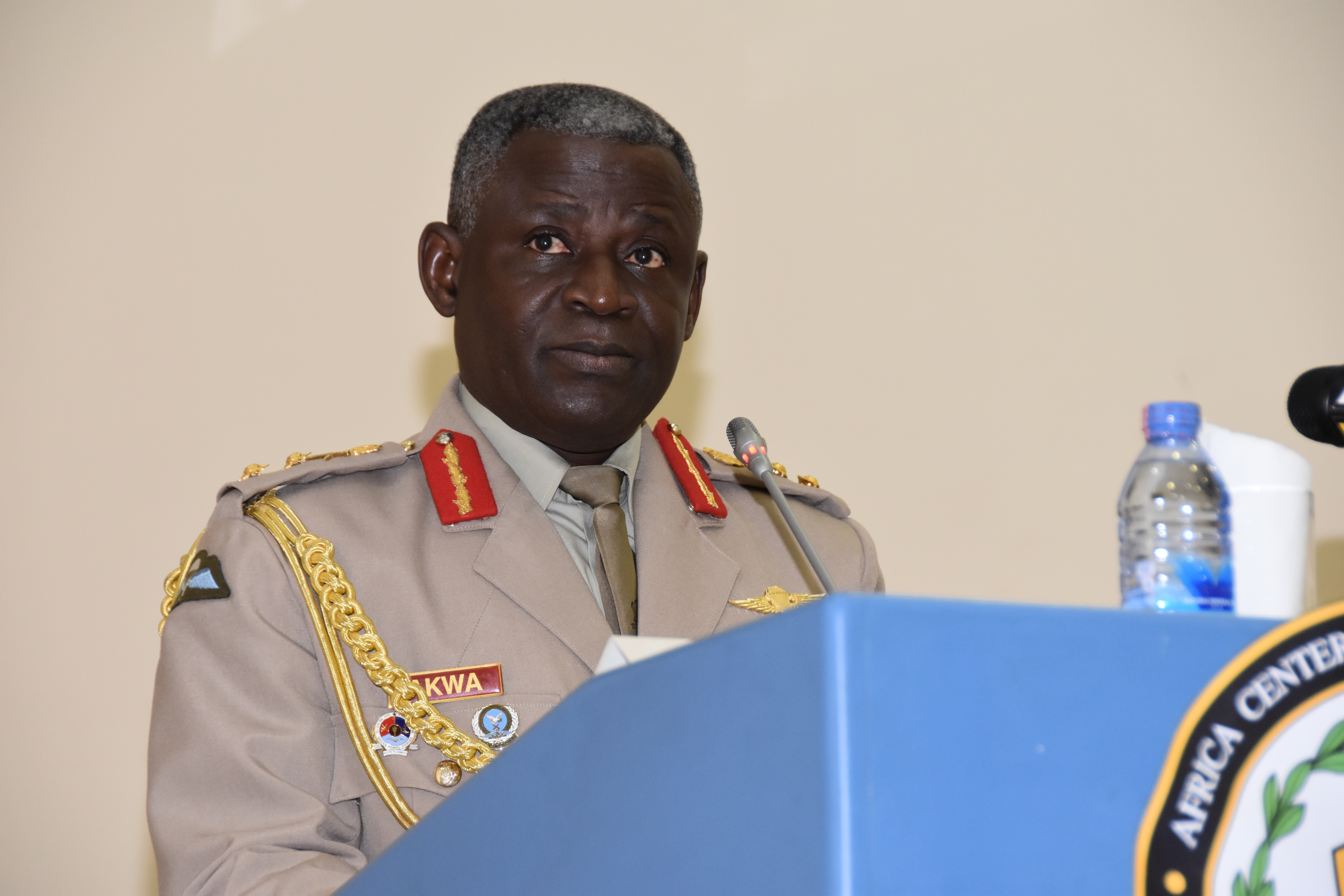
- Obed Akwa in 2016
- Born: Obed Boamah Akwa; 20 June 1955 (age 71)
- Education: Cranfield University
- Military career
- Allegiance: Ghana Armed Forces
- Branch: Ghana Army
- Service years: 1975-2021
- Rank: Lieutenant General
- Commands: Chief of the Defence Staff; Chief of Army Staff; Commandant, Kofi Annan International Peacekeeping Training Centre; Commanding Officer, 2nd Battalion of Infantry; Commander, Ghana Military Academy

Lieutenant General Obed Boamah Akwa (born 20 June 1955) is a retired Ghanaian military officer who served as the Chief of the Defence Staff of the Ghana Armed Forces from February 2017 to February 2021. Prior to his appointment, he was the Chief of Army Staff of the Ghana Armed Forces.

== Early life and education ==
Lieutenant General Obed Boamah Akwa was born on 20 June 1955. He went through various first cycle educational institutions in the Brong Ahafo, Eastern and Northern Regions of Ghana before gaining admission into Mpraeso Secondary School in 1968. On obtaining his General Certificate of Education (Ordinary Level), he proceeded to Sekondi College for his Sixth Form Studies from 1973 – 1975, and obtained the General Certificate of Education (Advanced Level). He enlisted into the Ghana Military Academy in October 1975. Lt. Gen. Obed Akwa had his basic military training at the Royal Military Academy, Sandhurst, United Kingdom from 1976 to 1977. He has academic qualifications in Global Security (MSc) from Cranfield University, England, 2003; Defence and Strategic Studies (MSc) from Madras University, India, 1977; and Public Administration (Certificate) from the Ghana Institute of Management and Public Administration, Accra, Ghana, 1989.

== Military career ==
Lieutenant General Akwa enlisted into the Ghana Military Academy in October 1975 and continued with his training at the Royal Military Academy, Sandhurst, United Kingdom, from January 1976 to March 1977. He was commissioned as a Second Lieutenant on 24 March 1977 and was first posted to the 1st Battalion of Infantry, as a Platoon Commander. Among the key appointments he has held include: Adjutant/Intelligence Officer, 1st Battalion of Infantry; Aide-de-Camp to the Chief of the Defence Staff; Adjutant and Company Commander, 2nd Battalion of Infantry; General Staff Officer, Grade III (Operations and Training) at the Headquarters 1 Infantry Brigade Group – now Headquarters Southern Command; Deputy Assistant Adjutant & Quartermaster General (DAA & QMG); Directing Staff, Ghana Armed Forces Command & Staff College (Junior Division); Course Commander, Ghana Military Academy; Deputy Army Secretary, Army Headquarters and Commanding Officer, 2nd Battalion of Infantry. Whilst in command of the 2nd Battalion, he was appointed as the Military Assistant to the Minister for Defence and thereafter became the Army Secretary at the Army Headquarters.

=== Office of the President ===
Gen Akwa was appointed to serve as the Aide-de-Camp (ADC) to the former President John Agyekum Kuffuor from 2005, till the end of his term in January 2009.

=== Commander, Ghana Military Academy ===
Between 2009 and 2012, the then Brig Gen Akwa was appointed Commander of the Ghana Military Academy. The Ghana Military Academy is a tri-service academy which trains potential cadets for commissioning into the Officer Corp of the various arms of the Ghana Armed Forces.

=== Peacekeeping Operations ===
General Akwa has extensive UN peacekeeping experience. Between October 1977 – March 1978 he served with the United Nations Emergency Force II (UNEF II) as a Platoon Commander, in the Sinai Desert. He was a Personnel Officer with the 24th Ghana Battalion in South Lebanon as part of the United Nations Interim Force in Lebanon (UNIFIL). He also served as a Military Observer with the United Nations Iraq – Kuwait Observation Mission (UNIKOM) in the immediate aftermath of the First Gulf War. Whilst with UNIKOM, he was re-deployed to serve with the United Nations Military Liaison Office in the former Yugoslavia (UNMLO-Y) prior to the insertion of the United Nations Protection Force (UNPROFOR). He also served as the Deputy Commanding Officer of the Ghana Battalion as part of the United Nations Transitional Authority in Cambodia (UNTAC). In his last UN mission, he served as the Western Brigade Commander/Ghanaian Contingent Commander with the United Nations Stabilisation Mission in Congo (MONUSCO). In this appointment, he commanded the largest sector of the MONUSCO operational area (covering six of the eleven Provinces of the country) in a highly dynamic, multicultural and multilingual environment.

=== Commandant, KAIPTC ===
General Akwa was appointed Commandant of the Kofi Annan International Peacekeeping Training Centre (KAIPTC) in Teshie. He served as Commandant until he was reassigned as Chief of Army Staff at the Army HQ, Burma Camp. He was succeeded by AVM GS Evans.

=== Chief of Army Staff ===
Maj Gen Akwa was appointed Chief of Army Staff on July 1, 2016, by former president John Mahama. He succeeded Maj Gen Adusei-Poku who had retired from active duty and was succeeded by Maj Gen Ayamdo in February 2017.

=== Chief of the Defense Staff ===
In February 2017, President Akufo-Addo announced the appointment of the then Maj Gen Akwa as the next Chief of the Defense Staff (CDS) replacing Air Marshal Oje who was due to retire. In lieu of his new appointment, he was promoted to the rank of Lieutenant General in the Ghana Army. In 2021, it was announced through a communique from the Office of the President that Lt Gen Akwa had come to the end of his duty tour and would be retiring effective 5 February 2021. He was succeeded by Rear Admiral Seth Amoama who was then the Chief of Naval Staff.

== Personal life ==
General Akwa is married to Mrs Dorothy Akwa and has four children and four grandchildren. He is a Christian and his hobbies include reading, writing, outdoor exercises, Squash Rackets and playing Scrabble.

Military offices
Preceded by Air Marshall Samson-Oje	Chief of the Defence Staff; 2017-2021	Succeeded by Vice Admiral Amoama
Preceded by Major General Opoku-Adusei	Chief of Army Staff; 2016-2017	Succeeded by Major General Ayamdo
