= Barwah Barracks =

Military barracks in Tamale

Barwah Barracks is a settlement in Tamale for personnel of the Airborne Special forces of Ghana Army branch of the Ghana Armed Forces.

The barracks was named after Major General Charles Barwah who was a former Chief of Army Staff of Ghana. He was killed during the 1966 Ghanaian coup d'état which overthrew the Convention People's Party government of Kwame Nkrumah due to his loyalty to Nkrumah. He won the Overseas Cadet Prize at Royal Military Academy Sandhurst where he distinguished himself.
