= Acquah =

Acquah is a Fante surname. Notable people with this surname include:

- Afriyie Acquah (born 1992), Ghanaian footballer
- Albert Acquah, Ghanaian-American educationist
- Alexander Akwasi Acquah (born 1974), Ghanaian politician
- Benjamin Acquah (born 2000), Ghanaian footballer
- Betty Acquah (born 1965), Ghanaian feminist painter
- David Acquah (born 2001), Ghanaian footballer
- Deborah Acquah (born 1996), Ghanaian long jumper
- Desmond Acquah (born 2002), Belgian footballer
- Edward Acquah (1935–2011), Ghanaian footballer
- Emile Acquah (born 2000), English footballer
- George Kingsley Acquah (1942–2007), Ghanaian judge
- Gideon Acquah (born 2000), Ghanaian footballer
- Henry Acquah (born 1965), Ghanaian footballer
- J. R. K. Acquah (fl. 1971), Ghanaian chief of Army Staff
- Kobena Eyi Acquah (born 1952), Ghanaian lawyer and poet
- Oliver Acquah (born 1946), Ghanaian footballer
- Paul Acquah, Ghanaian economist
- Reuben Acquah (born 1996), Ghanaian professional footballer
- Sam Acquah (1943–c. 2014), Ghanaian footballer
- Stephen Acquah (born 2006), Ghanaian footballer
