= Charles Barwah =

Ghanaian general (1929–1966)

Charles Mohammed Barwah
- Born: 13 April 1929; Kumasi, Gold Coast
- Died: 24 February 1966 (aged 36); Accra, Ghana
- Cause of death: Execution by firing squad
- Military career
- Allegiance: Ghana Armed Forces
- Branch: Ghana Army
- Service years: 1947–1966
- Rank: Major General
- Commands: Chief of Army Staff
- Memorials: Barwah Barracks

Major General Charles Mohammed Barwah (13 April 1929 – 24 February 1966) was a distinguished Ghanaian general who was Chief of Army Staff (Ghana) at the end of the First Republic.

== Early life ==
Barwah was born on 13 April 1929 in Kumasi in the then Gold Coast, now Ghana. His father was a sergeant in the army.

== Army career ==
Barwah enlisted in the 2nd Battalion of the Gold Coast Regiment in 1947, aged 18 years. He had been promoted to the rank of Sergeant by 1953.

As part of the process to increase the native officer pool of the army at independence from colonial rule approached, Barwah was the first native cadet officer from the Gold Coast to be sent to the Royal Military Academy Sandhurst. He was in the 2 Platoon, Blenheim Company of Intake 13 between 1953 and 1954. The College Commander at Sandhurst, Major General David Dawnay wrote that "his powerful physical build emphasises his strength of character". Barwah won the Overseas Cadet Prize and was also rated as the fourth among the 260 soldiers making up intake 13. He was described as "a brilliant young man with an outstanding record at Sandhurst and Camberley, and was already a Major General at thirty nine". In addition, "he was, in my view, head and shoulders above his contemporaries in intelligence, determination and integrity"

On his return to Ghana, Barwah rose rapidly through the ranks in the Ghana army. He was keen on education and set up a programme of education for soldiers and their children and was personally involved as one of the night class instructors.

By July 1965, Barwah, now a Major General, replaced Major General Stephen Otu as the Chief of Army Staff. He held this position until his death, when he was replaced by Colonel Ocran, who was then the Commander of the 1st Infantry Brigade, now the Southern Command. Ocran was promoted to Brigadier and was also a member of the National Liberation Council (NLC) military government.

He was described by Lieutenant General Ocran who succeeded him as Chief of Army Staff after he was killed during the coup d'état of 24 February 1966 which replaced the Convention People's Party CPP government of Kwame Nkrumah with the military NLC as a "Sandhurst-trained officer of outstanding merit and a real gentleman".

== 24 February coup and death ==
On 24 February, troops led by Emmanuel Kwasi Kotoka and Akwasi Afrifa led a bloody coup to overthrow the Nkrumah government. The Chief of the Defence Staff Major General Aferi was out of the country at the time and Barwah, as Chief of Army Staff was the highest ranked army officer at post. He refused to join the coup conspirators and professed his loyalty to the government. He was shot along with seven soldiers on guard duty at his residence by Afrifa and his soldiers. He was given a military burial along with the other fallen soldiers a few days later.

== Family and personal life ==
Barwah had eight children, six boys and two girls. His family have been lobbying for the body of Barwah to be released to the family for a formal burial. He was interested in the exploits of Baden-Powell and was going through a copy of his diaries at the time of his death. He was a Muslim.

== Honours ==
In his honour, the Barwah Barracks of the Airbone Special Forces of the Ghana Armed Forces at Tamale is named after him.

Military offices
Preceded by Major General Otu	Chief of Army Staff; 1965 to 1966	Succeeded by Brigadier Ocran
