= Allan Gilmour (British Army officer) =

British soldier and politician

Sir Allan MacDonald Gilmour
- Born: 23 November 1916; Edinburgh
- Died: 22 September 2003 (aged 86); Bonar Bridge
- Burial place: Invershin Cemetery, Creich, Sutherland
- Education: Trinity College, Oxford
- Military career
- Allegiance: United Kingdom
- Rank: Colonel
- Nickname: Uncle Allan
- Unit: Royal West African Frontier Force
- Commands: Gold Coast Regiment
- Conflicts: Second Battle of El Alamein; Battle of Wadi Akarit
- Awards: Military Cross; KCVO; Distinguished Service Cross (US)
- Other work: Chairman of Sutherland District Council; Highland Regional Council member Chairman, Highland Health Board; Chairman, East Sutherland Council of Social Service; Queen's Lord Lieutenant for Sutherland

Colonel Sir Allan MacDonald Gilmour of Invernauld, KCVO OBE MC of Rosehall, was a British soldier and politician. He was also the former lord lieutenant of Sutherland.

He was popularly called "Uncle Allan" and was well known for the North African campaign against General Rommel.

== Early life and education ==
Allan Gilmour was the only son of his father, Captain Allan Gilmour of Rosehall and Mary Macdonald of Portree. Captain Gilmour died at the age of 28 years from injuries sustained in Salmah, Macedonia, a year after his son was born. He served with the Lovat Scouts in the First World War Dardanelles campaign. He received his primary education at Cargilfield Preparatory School in Edinburgh and proceeded to Winchester College for his secondary school studies. He attended Trinity College, Oxford, where he read history.

== Military career ==
Gilmour joined the Lovat Scouts in 1937 where he obtained his commission. He then joined the Seaforth Highlanders in 1939. Between 1942 and 1943, he was with the 2nd Seaforth in the 51st Highland Division of the 8th Army in the North Africa campaign. He was awarded the Military Cross at the Second Battle of El Alamein, with a Bar to the MC for further displays of courage in the face of the German Afrika Korps at the Battle of Wadi Akarit. He took part in the invasion of Sicily. He returned to the United Kingdom in 1943. From 1944, he served in Normandy, the Netherlands, and in Germany where he received the Distinguished Service Cross from the United States.

Following the Second World War, he had various staff appointments. He also served with the British Army of the Rhine and later became a military and infantry instructor in the Middle East and Pakistan. He also served in Aden. He served as Chief of staff of the Ghana Army as a Lieutenant Colonel. He also served in the Congo. One of his last appointments was with the 11th Seaforth Highlanders (TA). At the time of his retirement in 1967, he was a Colonel of the Queens Own Highlanders (Seaforth and Camerons) from Headquarters, Scottish Command, Edinburgh.

== Other activities ==
Gilmour was elected as a member of Sutherland County Council in 1970. he was elected as the first chairman of the new Sutherland District Council in 1974, a position he held until 1987. He continued on the Housing Committee until prior to the elections in 1994. He represented the Dornoch, Creich, and Kincardine wards on the Highland Regional Council at its inception in 1974. He was also on the Highland Health Board and was its chairman from 1985 to 1987. He has also served as the chairman of the East Sutherland Council of Social Service and as a board member of the Scottish National Orchestra Society. He has also chaired the Highland River Purification Board. He was appointed deputy lieutenant for Sutherland in 1971 and the Queen's lord lieutenant in 1972. He received his knighthood (KCVO) in 1991.

== Accident at Bonar Bridge ==
Gilmour had his tie caught in his fan belt at Bonar Bridge on his way to a meeting at Dornoch. A French couple noticed his predicament and rescued him. His friends subsequently bought him lots of bow-ties to prevent a repeat.

== Family ==
He married Jean Wood, who was from a Seaforth Highlander family in Nairn in 1941. They had three sons and a daughter. She died in a fire in 2015. After his retirement, they settled at his home, Invernauld House at Sutherland.

== Death ==
He died at age 86 at Migdale Hospital, Bonar Bridge. He was buried at the Invershin Cemetery, Creich, Sutherland, next to his mother.

== See also ==
- Joseph Edward Michel

== External source ==
- Sir Allan Gilmour Soldier and former lord lieutenant of Sutherland
- Death of Lady Jean Gilmour in house fire leaves community reeling (Also shows picture of Allan Gilmour and wife)
