= William Azure Ayamdo =

Former Ghanaian Chief of Army Staff

- Military career
- Allegiance: Ghana Armed Forces
- Branch: Ghana Army
- Service years: 1980 - 2020
- Rank: Major General
- Commands: Chief of Army Staff

Major General William Azure Ayamdo is a retired Ghanaian military officer who is former Chief of Army Staff of the Ghana Army. He was appointed to the position by President Akuffo-Addo on 9 February 2017. He retired and handed over to Thomas Oppong Peprah

Military offices
Preceded by Major General Obed Akwa	Chief of Army Staff; 2017 - 2020	Succeeded by Major General Thomas Oppong-Peprah
