= Leonard George Corney =

British colonial administrator (1886–1955)

Leonard George Corney CMG
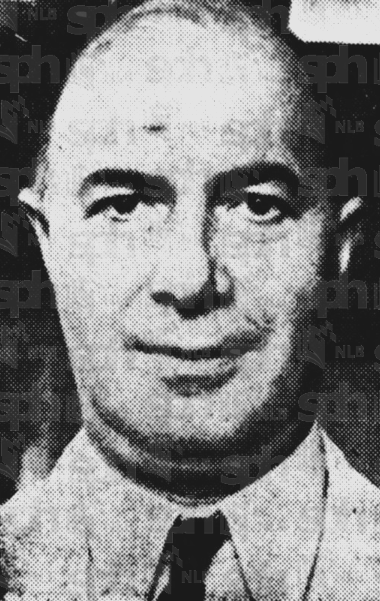
- Corney in 1940
- Born: 27 March 1886
- Died: 13 August 1955 (aged 69)
- Education: St John's College, Cambridge
- Occupation: Colonial admininistrator
- Children: 2

Leonard George Corney (27 March 1886 – 13 August 1955) was a British colonial administrator who was Auditor of the Federated Malay States and the Straits Settlements from 1936 to 1941.

== Early life and education ==
Corney was born on 27 March 1886, the youngest son of Alfred and Elizabeth Steele Corney. He was educated at St John's College, Cambridge as a classical exhibitioner.

== Career ==
Corney joined the Colonial Audit Service responsible for auditing the accounts of the British colonies and protectorates on behalf of the Secretary of State. In 1910, he was posted to the Gold Coast as assistant Auditor and in 1920 rose to Deputy Auditor of the Colony.

After serving for two years as assistant director of the Colonial Audit Department in London, in 1932, Corney went to Malaya where he served as Deputy Auditor of the newly constituted Audit Department of the Straits Settlements and the Federated Malay States, and was appointed to the substantive position of Auditor of the Straits Settlements and the Federated Malay States in 1936. He served as a member of the Legislative Council and was auditor of Singapore Municipality. In 1939, he served on the committee appointed by the Sultan of Johore to inquire into the organisation and administration of the Public Works Department of the state. In 1940, he was appointed Acting Financial Secretary of the Straits Settlements, and was chairman of the War Loan Committee which recommended that the government of the Straits Settlements raise a loan of $25 million loan for the war effort to be financed from an income tax uniformly introduced throughout Malaya, and subsequently served as chairman of the Joint Committee on Income Tax established to study its implementation. In December 1940, he announced he would leave the service when he reached retirement age the following year.

After the War, he served as a member East African Salaries Commission as Salaries Commissioner Aden and Somaliland in 1947.

During the First World War, he served in Europe with the Artists' Rifles (1916), and the Gold Coast Regiment (1917–18). During the Second World War, he was interned by the Japanese in Singapore from 1942 to 1945.

== Personal life and death ==
Corney married Hilda Fletcher in 1921 and they had a son and a daughter.

Corney died on 13 August 1955, aged 69.

== Honours ==
Corney was appointed Companion of the Order of St Michael and St George (CMG) in the 1946 Birthday Honours.
