= W. W. Bruce-Konuah =

Ghanaian military officer (1941–2011)

William Wallace Bruce-Konuah
- Born: 13 July 1941
- Died: 12 September 2011 (aged 70)
- Military career
- Allegiance: Ghana
- Branch: Ghana Army
- Rank: Brigadier
- Commands: Chief of the Army Staff

Brigadier William Wallace Bruce-Konuah (13 July 1941 – 12 September 2011) was a Ghanaian military officer who served as Chief of the Army Staff of the Ghana Army from 6 June 1979 to July 1979, during the period of political transition following the June 4th Uprising.

Prior to his appointment, he was the defense attaché to Ghana's High Commission in Pakistan. He was succeeded by Arnold Quainoo.

In 1983 he resumed foreign service at the Ghana Embassy in the United States. There, he worked as a Minister Consular.

In 1986 he was appointed managing director of Ghamot Company Limited.

On 18 September 2008, he together with six other former military and police officers were banned by the National Security Council from all military and police installations and garrisons. The ban was as a result of a meeting that was held on 1 September 2008 between these former security personnel who were in charge of various security agencies during the tenure of the former president, J. J. Rawlings. It is said that the aim of the meeting was to discuss how best they could also contribute in solving what they believed to be, "the worsening security situation in the country". The ban was lifted with immediate effect by the National Security Council on Tuesday 6 January 2009, a day before the swearing in of the then president elect, John Evans Atta Mills.
