= Thomas Oppong-Peprah =

Ghanaian chief of the defence staff

- Alma mater: Ghana Institute of Management and Public Administration; University of Ghana; King's College London
- Military career
- Allegiance: Ghana Armed Forces
- Branch: Ghana Army
- Service years: 1986 to 2025
- Rank: General
- Commands: Chief of the Defence Staff (2024 to 2025); Chief of Army Staff (2020 to 2024); Chief of Staff, General Headquarters (2019 - 2020); General Officer Commanding, Southern Command (2018 - 2019); Commanding Officer, Armoured Reconnaissance Regiment (2004-2005); Commanding Officer, 64 Infantry Regiment (2002 - 2009)

General Thomas Oppong-Peprah is a Ghanaian military officer and former Chief of the Defence Staff of the Ghana Armed Forces. His appointment to the position by President Akuffo-Addo was announced on 24 January 2024 to take effect from 1 February, 2024. He took over from Seth Amoama. Oppong-Peprah also serves as a member of the Governing council of the National Disaster Management Organisation (NADMO). In October 2025, he was appointed Ghana's Deputy Ambassador to Canada.

== Education ==
Oppong-Peprah started his basic education in Dormaa-Ahenkro Bono region. He attended the University of Ghana where he completed a Bachelor of Science degree in Administration, specialising in Human Resource Management, in 2004. He also holds a Post-Graduate Certificate in Public Administration from the Ghana Institute of Management and Public Administration (GIMPA) which he obtained in 1998. Furthermore, he was awarded his Master of Arts degree in International Security and Strategy from King's College London, which he completed in 2014. He also holds an Executive Master of Business Administration degree with a specialisation in Human Resource Management from the University of Ghana, which he completed in 2007.

== Military career ==
Oppong-Peprah was enlisted into the Ghana Armed Forces in 1986 as a member of Regular Career Course 26, and was subsequently assigned to the Armoured Reconnaissance Regiment with the rank of Second Lieutenant.

Throughout his career, he has held various significant appointments, including serving as Aide-de-Camp to the Chief of the Army Staff and Chief of the Defence Staff for the Ghana Armed Forces from 1995 to 1997. He also served as the Operations/Training Officer for the 64 Infantry Regiment from 1999 to 2000.

From 2002 to 2009, he assumed the role of Commanding Officer for the 64 Infantry Regiment, concurrently taking on the role of Commanding Officer for the Armoured Reconnaissance Regiment from 2004 to 2005. Additionally, he held the position of Coordinator of State Transport Security from 2001 to 2008 and worked as an Instructor for the Disaster Management Course at the Army Combat Training School in Teshie from 2001 to 2005.

He further held appointments such as Director of Strategic Intelligence Assessment at the Defence Intelligence Department, General Headquarters, from 2009 to 2011, and Director of Operations and Plans at the Defence Industries Department, General Headquarters, from 2011 to 2013. Subsequently, he served as Director of Army Training and Director of Army Peacekeeping Operations at the Army Headquarters from September 2014 to February 2016 and from February to July 2016, respectively. He then assumed the role of Chief Staff Officer at the same headquarters from July 2016 to February 2017.

Before becoming the Chief of Staff at the General Headquarters, he held the position of General Officer Commanding the Southern Command of the Ghana Army from February 2017 to January 2019. Following this, he assumed the role of Chief of the Army Staff in March 2020.

In the realm of international peacekeeping operations, Lieutenant General Oppong-Peprah served as a Humanitarian Officer for the United Nations Assistance Mission in Rwanda from June to December 1994, a Military Observer for the United Nations Aouzou Strip Observer Group in Libya/Chad from March to May 1994, and G4 Transport and Plans for the United Nations Mission for the Referendum in Western Sahara in 1993. Additionally, he served as Detachment Second-In-Command/Troop Leader for the United Nations Interim Force in Lebanon/Israel in 1987, 1989, and 1992.

== Personal life ==
Oppong-Peprah is married with five children. He enjoys activities such as horseback riding, soccer, travelling, watching movies, and jogging. Most people will ask the question, so where is he from, he was on tape to have stated that he's a proud Bono and hails from Dormaa-Ahenkro in the Bono region. They speak the "b3 b3" and he's proud of his Bono heritage.

Military offices
Preceded by Vice Admiral Seth Amoama	Chief of the Defence Staff; 2024 - 2025	Succeeded by Major General Agyapong
Preceded by Major General William Ayamdo	Chief of Army Staff; 2020 - 2024	Succeeded by Lieutenant General Bismarck Kwasi Onwona
