= Stephen Otu =

Ghanaian military person (1915–1979)

Stephen J. A. Otu
- Born: 23 October 1915
- Died: 23 October 1979 (aged 64); Nairobi, Kenya
- Military career
- Allegiance: Ghana
- Branch: Ghana Army
- Rank: Major General
- Commands: Chief of the Defence Staff

Major General Stephen Joseph Asamoa Otu (23 October 1915 – 23 October 1979) was a former Chief of the Defence Staff of the Ghana Armed Forces. He was the first Ghanaian officer to serve in this capacity.

== Career ==
Stephen Otu volunteered for service in the Gold Coast Regiment of the Royal West African Frontier Force. His service marked him out as a potential officer and, in 1947, he was posted to an Officer Cadet Training Unit (OCTU) in the United Kingdom to undertake a selection course. He passed out successfully and was commissioned on 1 May 1948. A decade later, in 1958, he became one of the original officers of the Ghana Regiment, when the Gold Coast gained its independence.

Initially a Company Commander (Major), he was soon promoted to command a Battalion, as a Lieutenant-Colonel. He continued through the higher ranks until, in October 1962, he became only the second Ghanaian to become the Chief of Army Staff, a position he occupied until July 1965 when the army headquarters became annexed to the Ministry of Defence. In 1961 the remaining British Army personnel left Ghana and Major-General S.J.A. Otu succeeded Major General Henry Templer Alexander, a British officer on loan, taking overall command as the first Ghanaian officer to become the Chief of Defence Staff of the Republic.

Military offices
| Preceded by Brigadier J. A. Ankrah | Chief of Army Staff; 1962 – 1965 | Succeeded by Major General C. M. Barwah |
| Preceded by Major General Henry Templer Alexander | Chief of the Defence Staff; 1961 – 1965 | Succeeded by Major General Nathan A. Aferi |
