= Joseph Narh Adinkrah =

Ghanaian military officer (1950–2025)

- Born: April 19, 1950; Koforidua, Eastern Region, Gold Coast (now Ghana)
- Died: December 4, 2025 (aged 75)
- Education: Ghana Military Academy; University of Liverpool
- Military career
- Allegiance: Ghana
- Branch: Ghana Army
- Service years: 1973–2013
- Rank: Major General
- Commands: Chief of Army Staff; General Officer Commanding, Northern Command
- Conflicts: Rwandan genocide First Liberian Civil War
- Awards: Companion of the Order of the Volta (CV); Grand Medal (Ghana); Rwanda National Order of Bravery; United Nations Peacekeeping Medals

Major General Joseph Narh Adinkrah (19 April 1950 – 4 December 2025) was a Ghanaian military officer who served as Chief of Army Staff of the Ghana Army from 31 March 2009 to 4 April 2013. Before his appointment as the Chief of the Army Staff, he was the General Officer Commanding, Northern Command of the Ghana Army.

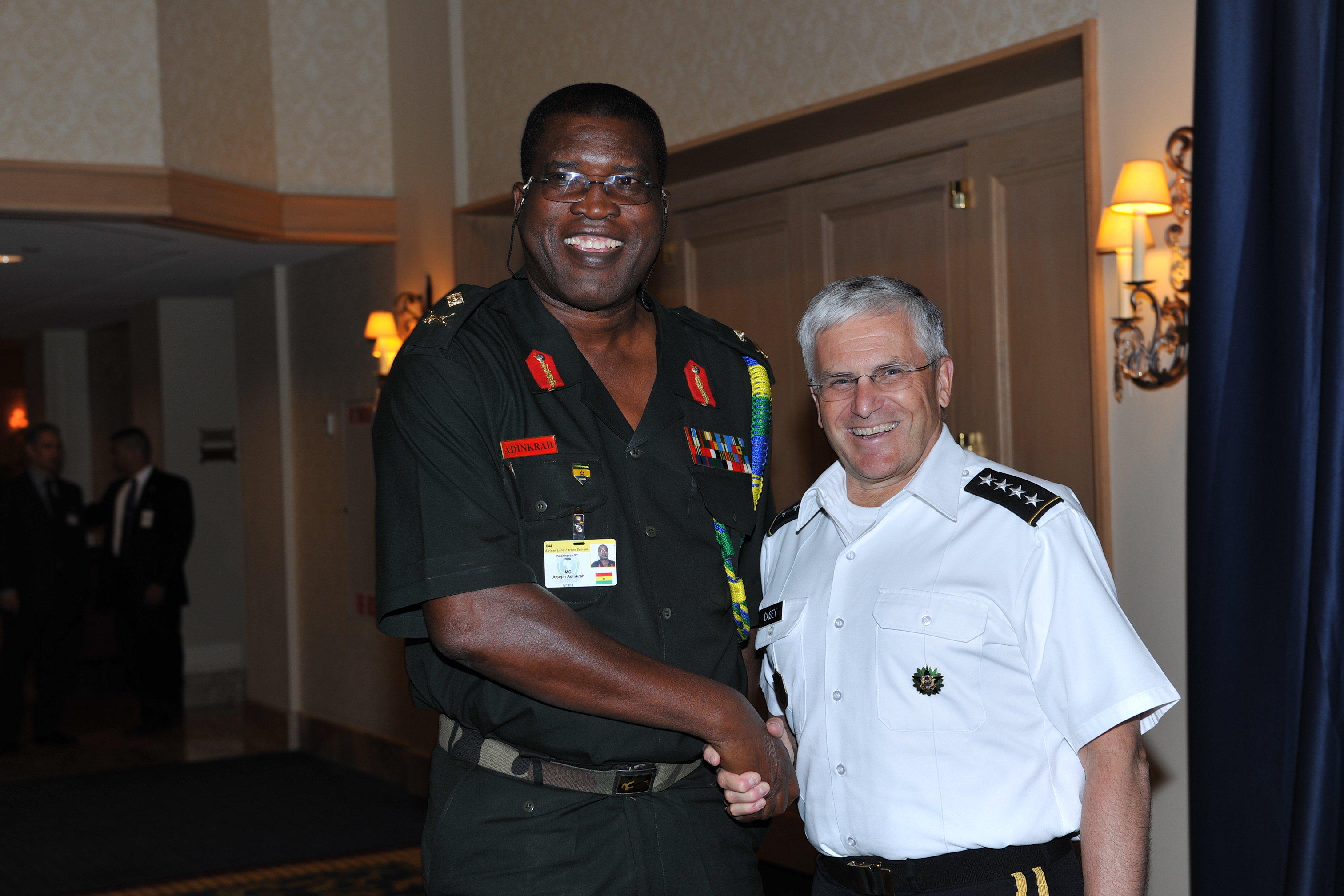
Major General Joseph Narh Adinkrah at the African Land Forces Summit, 2010

== Early life and education ==
Joseph Narh Adinkrah was born on 19 April 1950 in Somanya in the Eastern Region of Ghana to Emmanuel Tando Amponsah Adinkrah and Emile Kuse Nyarko. His father was of Fante origin while his mother was Krobo.

He attended Accra Academy from 1965 to 1970, where he obtained the General Certificate of Education Ordinary Level, and studied at Ghana Secondary Technical School in Takoradi for his advanced level education from 1970 to 1972.

He subsequently enrolled at the Ghana Military Academy and was commissioned into the Ghana Army as a Second Lieutenant on 21 July 1973.

Throughout his career, he undertook professional military education including the Young Officers Course, Senior Staff Course, the International Defence Management Course at the Naval Postgraduate School (1998), and the Executive National Security Programme at the South African National Defence College (2005). He also obtained an MBA from the University of Liverpool.

== Military career ==
=== Early career ===
Adinkrah began his military career with the 2nd Battalion of Infantry (2BN), serving as a platoon commander, and later as an instructor at the Boys Company, contributing to training and development within the army.

He subsequently held several command and staff roles, including Platoon Commander of the 4th Battalion of Infantry (4BN), Brigade Intelligence Officer, General Staff Officer (GSO 3), Brigade Major, Officer Commanding of the 5th Battalion of Infantry (5BN), and Second-in-Command of the 3rd Battalion of Infantry (3BN).

=== Senior leadership ===
He later served at Army Headquarters as Chief Staff Officer (CSO) and Director of Manpower Planning.

Adinkrah served as General Officer Commanding (GOC) of the Northern Command prior to his appointment as Chief of Army Staff.

In March 2009, he was appointed Chief of Army Staff following a restructuring of the Ghana Armed Forces under President John Atta Mills. During his tenure, he oversaw operational readiness, personnel reforms, and Ghana’s continued participation in international peacekeeping missions.

He retired from active military service in 2013 after approximately four decades in uniform.

== Peacekeeping operations ==
Adinkrah served in multiple international peacekeeping missions, including UNEF II in Sinai, UNIFIL in Lebanon, ECOMOG in Liberia, and MONUC in the Democratic Republic of the Congo.

=== Rwanda (UNAMIR) ===
In 1994, he commanded a Ghanaian battalion under the United Nations Assistance Mission for Rwanda (UNAMIR), where his unit contributed to civilian protection and stabilisation during the Rwandan genocide.

His leadership during the mission formed part of Ghana’s recognised contribution to peacekeeping efforts in Rwanda.

== Honours and awards ==
Adinkrah received several national and international honours in recognition of his service.

- Rwanda National Order of Bravery (2022), awarded by President Paul Kagame
- Companion of the Order of the Volta (CV)
- Grand Medal (Ghana) (1997)
- United Nations Peacekeeping Medals

== Personal life ==
Adinkrah's interests included reading, lawn tennis, and international security affairs.

== Death and legacy ==
Adinkrah died on 4 December 2025. His funeral service was held at Burma Camp in Accra, followed by burial at the Military Cemetery.

He is regarded as one of Ghana’s distinguished senior military officers, particularly for his leadership in peacekeeping operations and his role in military institutional development.
