= Ernest Walter Davie Western =

Brigadier Ernest Walter Davie Western (1901–1952) was the first son of Walter Western (1871–1936) and Elizabeth Ann Heard (1875–1952). E.W.D. Western was born on 2 Feb, 1901, in Gibraltar. He was educated at the Simon Langton Grammar School for Boys, Canterbury, in 1918. He passed the entrance exam to the Royal Military College, Sandhurst, 1919 and was commissioned into the 2nd Battalion Queen's Own Royal West Kent Regiment.

In late 1937 he married Pamela Rachel Petrides (the daughter of Sir Philip Bertie Petrides, the chief justice of the Gold Coast (1936–1943), and they had three children.

== D.S.O ==
In late 1940, while commanding the 3rd Battalion of the Gold Coast Regiment (12th Division of the 24th Gold Coast Brigade), Lieutenant-Colonel E.W.D. Western took action with his brigade that later earned him a D.S.O. His D.S.O was announced in the London Gazette on 30 December 1941. His commanding officer made a recommendation for him to receive the D.S.O. which reads:

FOR CONSPICUOUSLY MERITORIOUS SERVICES.

This officer has commanded his Battalion on Active Service with marked ability during the whole of the East African campaign. His Battalion was only formed in October 1939, and all the men and practically all the officers were recruits. By his devotion to duty, his personal example, and coolness under fire, he has set a very fine example to his Battalion with the result that they have assumed the offensive spirit to a marked degree. In recent operations at UADARA, North of NEGHELLI (Negele, Ethiopia), his Battalion were acting as an Independent unit directly under Division. He led his Battalion with great skill and succeeded in pushing back a large enemy force a distance of 3 miles from their strong covering positions on to their main positions, killing a large number of enemy in the process. His gallantry and untiring perseverance during these operations were most marked.

- Signed: AB Cunningham
- Signed: Melville Richards, Brigadier, 24th (Gold Coast) Brigade.
- "Recommended on his record during his period 15 Nov '40 to S. Africa {illegible}"
- Signed: {illegible}, Major-General, Commander 12th (African) Division.

Between 1946 and 1951 he commanded the 2nd Battalion, Royal West Kent Regiment in Germany and the 129th Infantry Brigade in Oxford. In 1951 he was posted to Kenya to command troops in the Northern Area which was the center of the Mau Mau rebellion of late 1952. In September 1952, while on local leave, he suffered a heart attack and died in hospital at Malindi, Mombassa on 19 December 1952. He is buried in the Mombassa Municipal Cemetery, grave D93.
