= Michel Camp =

Ghana army camp

Coordinates: 5°43′47″N 0°0′55″W

First Battalion
- Active: 1957
- Country: Ghana
- Allegiance: Ghana Armed Forces
- Branch: Ghana Army
- Type: Infantry
- Part of: Southern Command
- Garrison/HQ: Michel Camp
- Patron: Joseph Edward Michel

Michel Camp is the base of the 1st Battalion of the Ghana Regiment. It is located at Tema in the Greater Accra Region of Ghana. The First Battalion together with the Second and Fifth Battalions of Infantry make up the Southern Command of the Ghana Army.

Following the Gold Coast becoming the independent country Ghana in March 1957, all of the Gold Coast Military Forces, including the Gold Coast Regiment, were withdrawn from the Royal West African Frontier Force in 1959. With the country's change of name to Ghana, the regiment was renamed as the Ghana Regiment. (Note: -quoted in African theatre of World War I but link now dead.)

Michel Camp was named after Brigadier Michel who was one of the most senior Ghanaians in the Ghana Army after independence. He had been the Aide-de-camp to President Kwame Nkrumah. He also served as a Brigade commander with the United Nations Operation in the Congo (UNOC). He was due to return to Zaire to serve as the Chief of staff of UNOC. He died in an air crash at Kumasi in Ghana weeks before taking up the position.

== See also ==
- Ghana Regiment
- Joseph Edward Michel
- Royal West African Frontier Force
