= Samuel Odotei =

Ghanaian military officer

Major General Samuel Odotei (also known Major General Samuel Anum Odotei, Major General Samuel Nii Anum Odotei) as is a Ghanaian military personnel and a former Chief of Army Staff of the Ghana Army. He served as Chief of Army Staff from 20 May 2005 – 2009. He also served as the Dean of the Commonwealth Group of High Commissioner. As at 2023, he is the Dzasetse of La.
