= 2nd (West Africa) Infantry Brigade =

WW2 British Army formation

- Active: 1940–1945
- Allegiance: British Crown
- Branch: British Empire
- Type: Infantry
- Size: Brigade
- Part of: 2nd (African) Division; 12th (African) Division; 82nd (West Africa) Division
- Engagements: East African Campaign; Burma Campaign

Commanders
- Notable commanders: Collen Edward Melville Richards

The 2nd (West Africa) Infantry Brigade was a Second World War formation of the British Army. It was formed from battalions of the Royal West African Frontier Force in 1940. In the early part of the war, the Brigade served in the East African campaign before seeing action against the Japanese in Burma in 1944–45.

== History ==
The brigade was originally formed as 4th (Gold Coast) Infantry Brigade but was re-designated 24th (Gold Coast) Infantry Brigade in October 1940. It was involved in the East African Campaign against the forces of the Italian Colonial Empire in Kenya under the command of Brigadier Collen Edward Melville Richards and was attached to the 2nd (African) Division. During the East African Campaign, the brigade was part of Alan Cunningham's force which attacked from Kenya into Italian Somaliland and then advanced into Ethiopia. After the campaign, the brigade returned to West Africa in December 1941 and was reorganized as an independent brigade group (with attached engineer and artillery units). They were then designated as the 2nd (West African) Infantry Brigade.

In October 1942 command of the brigade passed to Brigadier Ernest Western who was to remain in this role until March 1945. In 1944, reorganized once more as an infantry brigade, the 2nd (West African) was attached to the 82nd (West Africa) Division and sailed for Ceylon, where the complete division was assembled on July 20. They then moved to Burma and took part in the third Arakan Campaign in December 1944 as part of Philip Christison's XV Corps.

It first advanced south along the Kalapanzin valley, then crossed a steep and jungle-covered mountain range to converge with the British 81st (West Africa) Division on Myohaung at the mouth of the Kaladan River. This move forced the Japanese to evacuate the Mayu peninsula which they had held for almost four years, and retreat south along the coast. They continued to advance maintaining pressure, on the Japanese capturing the port of Gwa shortly before the Japanese abandoned Burma. Western was wounded in March 1945 and command of the brigade was given to Brigadier Adam Wilson-Brand.

=== Formation ===
The 2nd (West Africa) Infantry Brigade was made up of the following units:

- 1st Bn., The Gold Coast Regiment;
- 2nd Bn., The Gold Coast Regiment;
- 3rd Bn., The Gold Coast Regiment.
