= 42nd Armoured Regiment (India) =

Indian Army regiment

- Active: 1918 - 1921; 1941 - 1943; 1981 - present
- Country: (British Raj) British India 1918-1921, 1941-43; India 1981-present
- Allegiance: India
- Branch: British Indian Army; Indian Army
- Type: Armour
- Size: Regiment
- Nickname: Bayalees
- Mottos: कर्म, शौर्य और विजय; Karma, Shaurya aur Vijay (Action, Courage and Victory)
- Colors: French Grey, Maroon and Black

Commanders
- Colonel of the Regiment: Lieutenant General Devendra Sharma

Insignia
- Abbreviation: 42 Armd Regt

42nd Armoured Regiment is an armoured regiment of the Indian Army Armoured Corps of the Indian Army.

== Formation ==
The current regiment was raised with an "all India class" composition at Babina on 1 January 1981 by Lieutenant Colonel (later Brigadier) Ranjit Talwar (formerly of 18 Cavalry). The first Colonel of Regiment was Lieutenant General G. S. Klair, AVSM.

The regiment has served in many different locations, but mostly across Northern India locations like Ambala, Jalandhar, Lucknow, Babina, Barmer and Amritsar.

Prior to World War II, regiments of similar names existed.

== 42nd Cavalry Regiment (1918-1921) ==
During World War I, a regiment named the "42nd Cavalry Regiment" was raised at Baleli by Maj Percy Henry Mitchell Taylor of the 32nd Lancers. The Regiment was raised from a squadron from 10th Lancers (Hodson's Horse) and the 35th Scinde Horse. The ethnic composition was as follows:-

- Pathans - half squadron.
- Sikhs - one and three quarter squadrons.
- Punjabi Muslims - one and a quarter squadrons.
- Dogras and Hindustani Muslims – a quarter squadron each.

The cap badge of the 42nd Cavalry Regiment was the Roman numeral "XLII", surmounted by a crown with a scroll below bearing the word "CAVALRY". The shoulder title was a numeral "42" atop the word "CAVALRY" curved concavely. The regiment was disbanded shortly afterwards in 1921.

== 42nd Cavalry, Indian Armoured Corps (1941-1944) ==
When the Indian Cavalry was converted into the Indian Armoured Corps in 1941, seven new armoured regiments were raised, numbered 42nd to 48th. The regiment was thus re-raised after 20 years as 42nd Cavalry, Indian Armoured Corps in April 1941. The regiment was equipped with Daimler and Humber armoured cars. After raising, the regiment moved to Piska Camp, Ranchi where it was converted in February 1942 into a training unit for VCOs and NCOs.

The initial levy of 200 sowars (soldiers), along with the Commanding Officer, Risaldar Major and two British Officers came from 3 Cavalry and an attempt to rename the unit as the 2nd Regiment, 3rd Cavalry was not accepted. In February 1944, the regiment was disbanded, and the armoured cars handed over to the 8th King George V's Own Light Cavalry.

While no specimen of a cap badge of the 42nd Cavalry is available today, two patterns are known to have been in use:

- Crossed sabres with Roman numeral "XLII" on the crossing with a scroll below bearing the word "CAVALRY".
- Roman numeral "XLII" over a scroll below bearing the word "CAVALRY". This has been recorded from headstones of the war dead of the 42nd Cavalry.

== Equipment ==
The regiment was equipped with the T-55 tanks with a 100 mm gun at the time of its raising. This was subsequently upgunned to a 105 mm gun. The regiment is presently equipped with T-90 tanks. One of the decommissioned T-55 tanks had been preserved in the memorial park of La Martinière College, Lucknow.

== Operations ==
B squadron of the regiment has participated in Operation Rakshak I. The regiment was also pressed into service during Operation Trident, Operation Vijay and Operation Parakram.

== Achievements ==
- The Regiment had the honour of participating in the Republic Day parade in 1989 and 2024.
- Captain JK Singh successfully scaled Abi Gamin in 1980.
- Captain JIS Hassanwalia represented the Services team in tennis.
- Lieutenant Colonel Ashish Bhagawan Sutar made history as the first Armoured Corps officer to become a Cyber Forensics Expert and the Head of the Cyber Forensic Laboratory, Army Cyber Group for three years.

== Regimental insignia ==
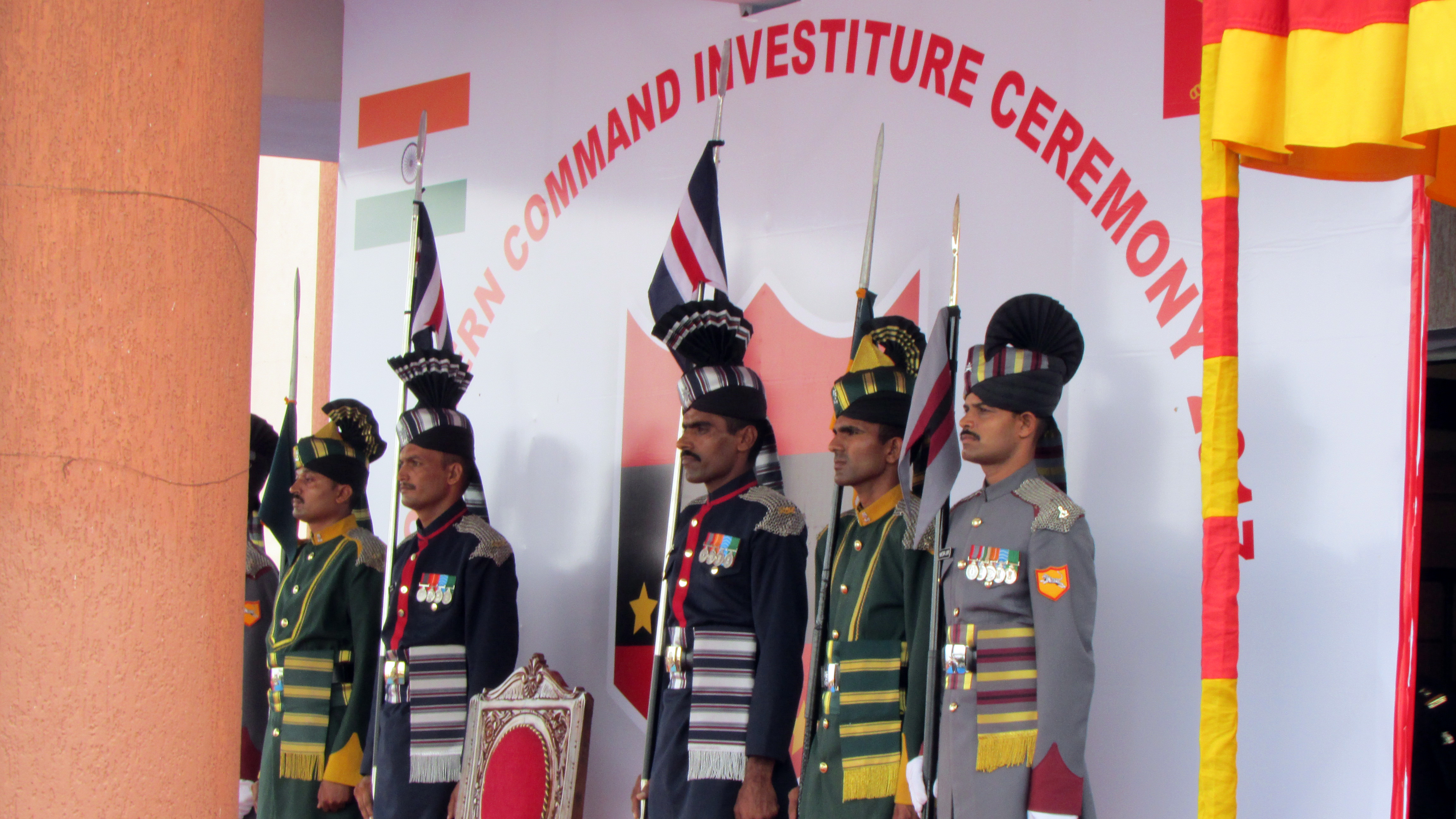
Soldier of the 42 Armoured Regiment in 'ceremonial uniform' (extreme right)

The cap badge consists of a pair of crossed sabres, on the crossing of which is placed the lower hull of a T-55 tank facing ahead, with numeral 42 placed above. The numerals are topped with a mailed right handed gauntlet and a scroll at the base with the Regimental Motto in Devanagari script.

The shoulder title is in brass and consists of the numeral 42 topped by a right-handed mailed gauntlet.

The regimental colours are French Grey, Maroon and Black - French Grey signifies courage, Maroon represents valour and Black signifies the Armoured Corps sense of duty.

The motto of the regiment = कर्म, शौर्य और विजय (Karma, Shaurya aur Vijay) is derived from the annals of the Bhagavad Gita and translates to ‘Action, Courage and Victory’.
