= W.M. Mensah-Wood =

Major General W.M. Mensah-Wood was a Ghanaian military personnel and a former Chief of Army Staff of the Ghana Army. He served as Chief of Army Staff from June 1987 – June 1990.
