= D. A. Asare =

- Born: David Acquah Asare
- Occupation: military personnel
- Notable work: He served as Chief of Army Staff from Feb 1972 to Jan 1973.

Brigadier D. A. Asare was a Ghanaian military personnel and a former Chief of Army Staff of the Ghana Army. He served as Chief of Army Staff from Feb 1972 to Jan 1973.
