= Military ranks of Saint Kitts and Nevis =

The Military ranks of Saint Kitts and Nevis are the military insignia used by the Saint Kitts and Nevis Defence Force.

== Commissioned officer ranks ==
The rank insignia of commissioned officers.

Rank group	General / flag officers	Senior officers		Junior officers
SKN Regiment
SKN Regiment		Lieutenant-colonel	Major	Captain	Lieutenant	Second lieutenant
Saint Kitts and Nevis Coast Guard
Saint Kitts and Nevis Coast Guard		Commander	Lieutenant Commander	Lieutenant	Sub-Lieutenant	Midshipman
Rank group	General / flag officers	Senior officers		Junior officers

=== Student officer ranks ===
Rank group	Student officer
Officer cadet

== Other ranks ==
The rank insignia of non-commissioned officers and enlisted personnel.

Rank group	Senior NCOs				Junior NCOs		Enlisted
SKN Regiment							No insignia
SKN Regiment	Warrant officer 1	Warrant officer 2	Staff sergeant	Sergeant	Corporal	Lance corporal	Private
Saint Kitts and Nevis Coast Guard
Saint Kitts and Nevis Coast Guard	Warrant officer class 1	Warrant officer class 2	Chief petty officer	Petty officer	Leading rate		Able rate
Rank group	Senior NCOs				Junior NCOs		Enlisted
