= William Agyapong =

Ghanaian soldier

- Education: Tema Secondary School; University of London; King's College London
- Military career
- Allegiance: Ghana Armed Forces
- Branch: Ghana Army
- Service years: November 1988 to date
- Rank: LT General
- Commands: Chief of the Defence Staff
- Known for: Operation Vanguard

Lieutenant General William Agyapong is a Ghanaian soldier and accountant. He is the current Chief of the Defence Staff of the Ghana Armed Forces. He joined the Ghana Army in 1988 and was commissioned as an Infantry officer in August 1990.

== Early life and education ==
Agyapong attended the Effiduase Secondary Commercial School in the Ashanti Region for his general secondary education. His sixth form education was at the Tema Secondary School in the Greater Accra Region.

Agyapong holds a Master of Science in Professional Accountancy from the University of London and a Master of Arts in International Security and Strategy from the King's College London. He also has a Diploma in Forensic Accounting from the Brentwood Institute in the United Kingdom. He is a chartered accountant and a member of the Association of Chartered Certified Accountants.

== Army career ==
Agyapong joined the Ghana Army in 1988. He was commissioned as an Infantry officer after completing his training in August 1990.

He has served with various units in a variety of capacities. He served with Economic Community of West African States Monitoring Group (ECOMOG), ECOWAS military intervention in the Gambia (ECOMIG), United Nations Interim Force in Lebanon (UNIFIL) and United Nations Assistance Mission for Rwanda (UNAMIR).

Agyapong served as one of the faculty on the Defence Management Course at the Ghana Armed Forces Command and Staff College.

Agyapong worked as a strategic planner at the United Nations Secretariat between 2013 and 2016. In 2023, he became the Military Advisor to Ghana's Permanent Representative at the United Nations.

In July 2017, then Colonel Agyapong was put in command of a joint military and police task force Operation Vanguard set up by the Ghana government aimed at curbing illegal mining or galamsey which had become a major cause of pollution in the country. He led this unit from its inception until December 2017 when he handed over to Colonel Michael Amoah-Ayisi.

On 24 March 2025, Agyapong was promoted to the rank of Major General. He was also appointed the Chief of the Defence Staff of Ghana by President of Ghana John Mahama on the same day. He replaced General Oppong-Peprah.

Military offices
Preceded by Oppong-Peprah	Chief of the Defence Staff; 2025 to date	Incumbent
