= 15th Armoured Regiment (India) =

Indian Army regiment

15 Armoured Regiment
- Active: 1985 – present
- Country: India
- Allegiance: India
- Branch: Indian Army
- Type: Armoured Corps
- Size: Regiment
- Mottos: जंग के जवाहर; Jang ke Jawahar (Jewels of war)
- Equipment: T-90 tanks

Commanders
- Colonel of the Regiment: Lieutenant General Vipul Singhal
- Notable commanders: Maj Gen Kuldip Sindhu, VSM

Insignia
- Abbreviation: 15 Armd Regt

15 Armoured Regiment is an armoured regiment of the Indian Army.

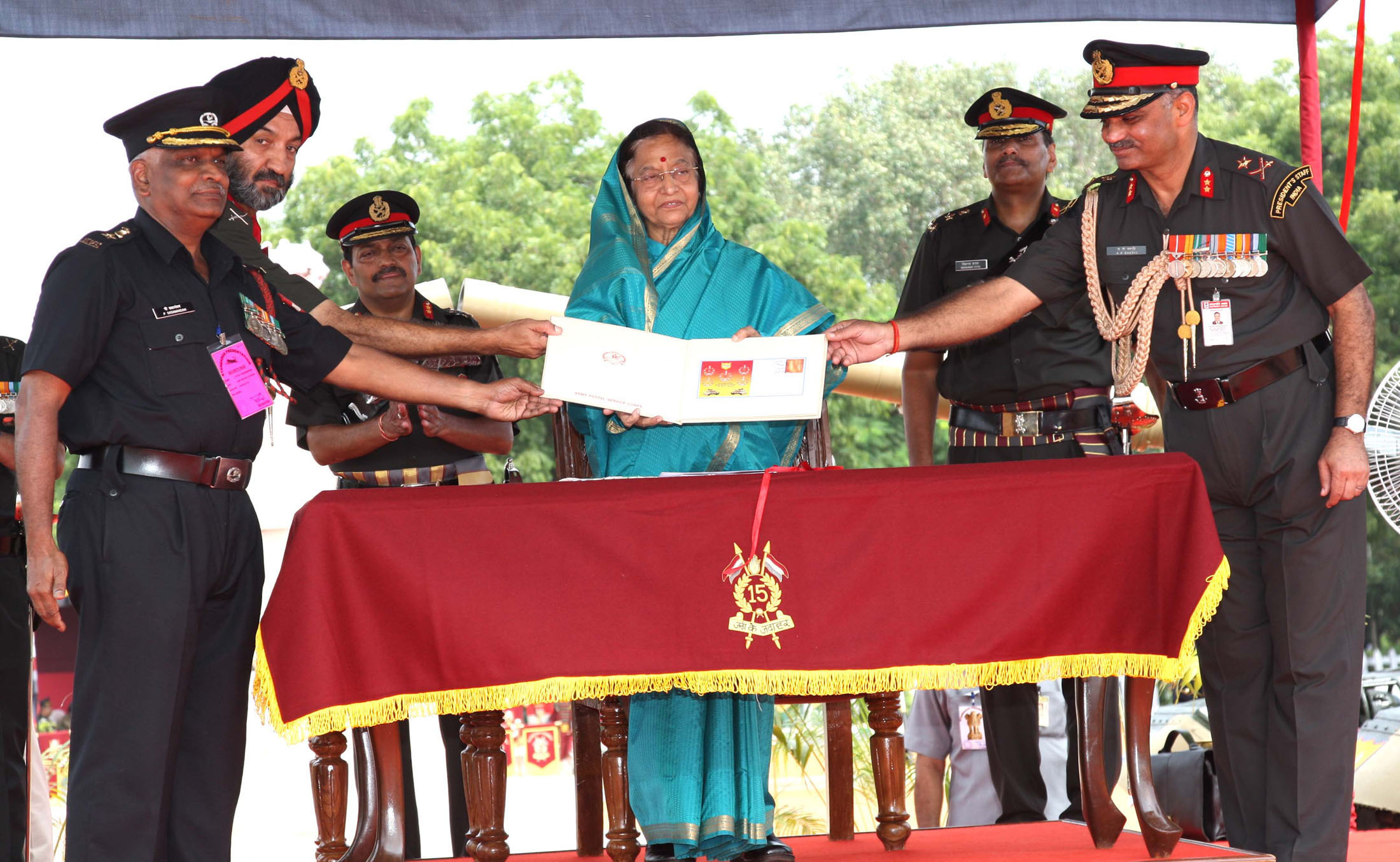
President Pratibha Devisingh Patil releasing the ‘First Day Cover’ on the occasion of Standard presentation to the 15 Armoured Regiment.

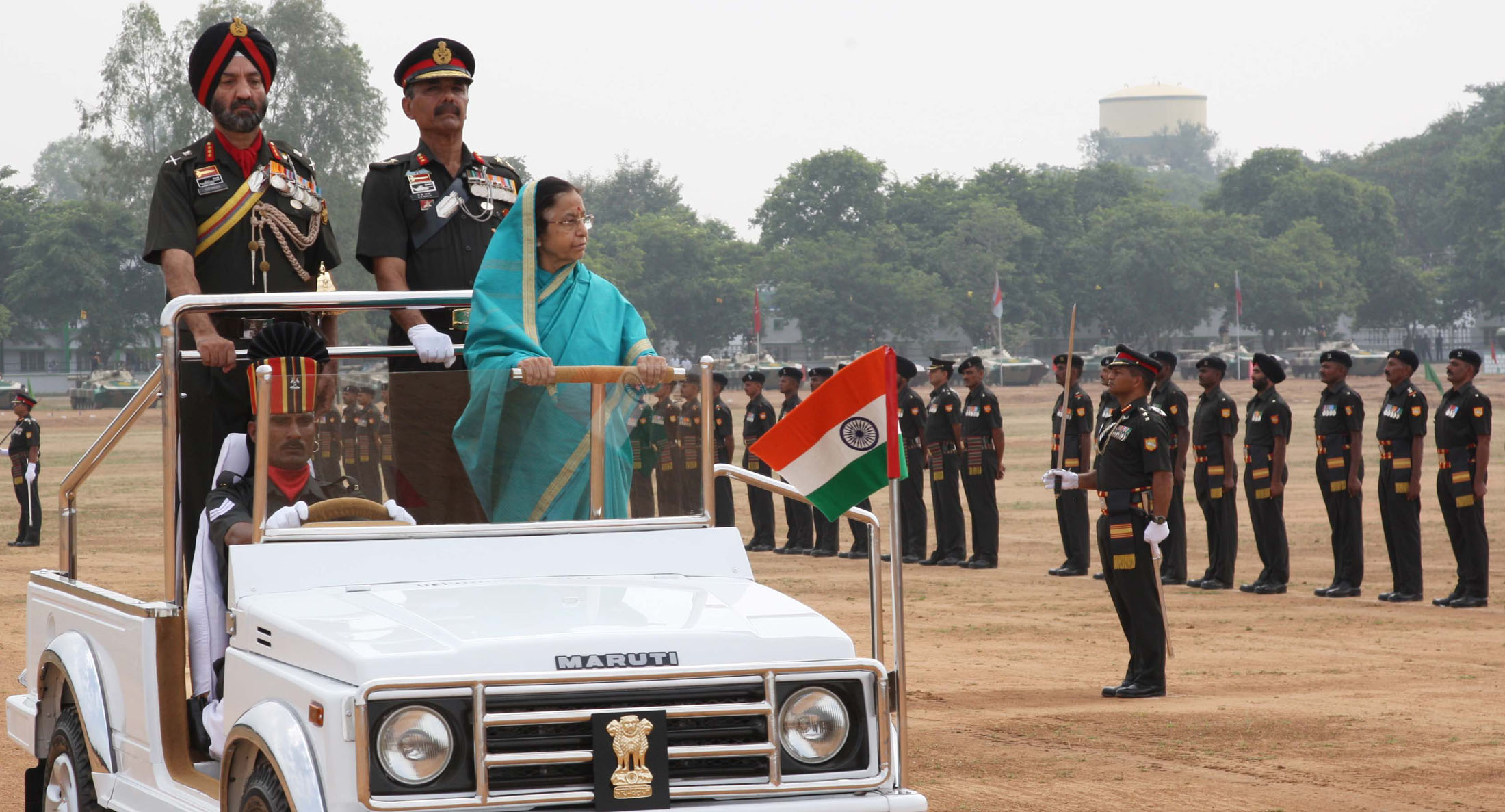
The President and Supreme Commander of the Armed Forces, Mrs. Pratibha Patil inspecting the Guard of Honour, at Babina, Uttar Pradesh on October 19, 2010, during the presentation of the colours.

== Formation ==
15 Armoured Regiment was raised on 1 March 1985 at Mamun Cantonment, Pathankot. It has an all-India all-class composition, drawing troops from various castes and religions.

== History ==
The regiment took part in Operation Trident, Operation Rakshak, Operation Vijay and Operation Parakram.

Captain Shashikant Sharma of the regiment was posthumously awarded the Sena Medal, when he was martyred defending Bana Post in Siachen Glacier. He was attached to 12 JAK LI.

The Regiment was presented the ‘President’s Standards’ at Babina, Uttar Pradesh on 19 October 2010 by the then President of India, Mrs. Prathiba Patil. Five armoured regiments of the 31 Armoured Division (15, 12, 13, 83 and 19 Armoured Regiments) were awarded the colours.

== Equipment ==
The Regiment was equipped with Vijayanta tanks at its raising. It is presently equipped with the T-90 tanks.

== Regimental Insignia ==
The Regimental insignia consists of crossed lances with pennons, overlaid with the numeral "15" inscribed on the crossing of the lances, surrounded by laurel leaves, mounted by a palm and a scroll at the base with the regimental motto. The motto of the regiment is जंग के जवाहर (Jang ke Jawahar), which translates to ‘Jewels of war’.
