= Operation Vanguard =

Military police joint task force in Ghana

Date	July 2017
Location	Ghana
Status	Ongoing: 1,000 illegal artisanal miners arrested. 340 makeshift accommodations destroyed (January 2018).; 3002 Chang-fa machines (floating devices) destroyed (January 2018)

Belligerents
Ghana Armed Forces, Ghana Police Service	Galamseyers

Commanders and leaders
Col. William N Nortey, Amr, Special Monitoring Nana Yaw Boadu	

Units involved
4 FOB	

Strength
400	?

Operation Vanguard is a military police joint task force (JTF) set up by the President of Ghana in 2017 to combat illegal mining, known as galamsey. Over the years, the practice has depleted Ghana's forest cover and polluted bodies of water due to the crude and unregulated nature of the mining process.

== Background ==
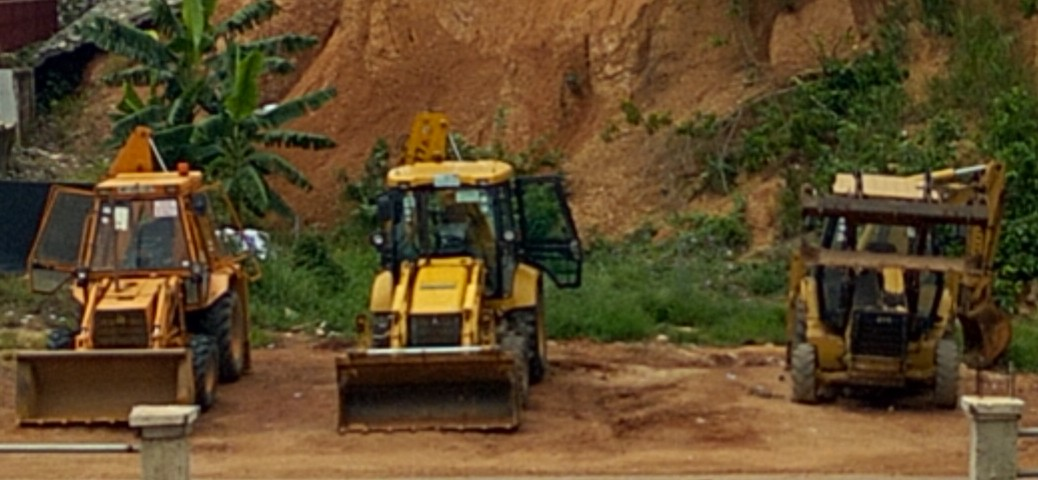
Earth moving equipment used in galamsey

The formation of Operation Vanguard was necessitated by the formation of the Media Coalition Against Galamsey on 4 April 2017. The coalition was a collective of concerned journalists in Ghana led by workers of the Graphic Communications Group Limited. Using all media platforms available to the coalition, pressure was mounted on the Government of Ghana to respond to the environmental degradation caused by galamsey. Galamsey had resulted in some cocoa and cashew farms being sold by owners so that the fertile soil could be excavated for allegedly being sold out for illegal mining activities.

The level of pollution of water bodies had caused an increase in production costs for the Ghana Water Company. The increase in cost was due to the extra cost of aluminium sulphate the company needed to treat water from the polluted water bodies. The activities of the media coalition gained support from many Ghanaians who knew the environmental damage galamsey was causing. President Nana Addo Dankwa Akufo-Addo responded by promising to end the galamsey menace even if it would cause disaffection from those who benefited from galamsey.

== Launch ==
Nana Akuffo-Addo launched Operation Vanguard group on 31 July 2017 in fulfillment of his promise. The aim of the group is stopping the activities of galamseyers in the three most galamsey ravaged regions in the country. Three Forward Operating Bases were established in those regions namely Ashanti, Eastern and Western Regions. Towns in the regions where the activities of galamseyers are high are Tarkwa in the Western, Obuasi in the Ashanti and Osino in the Eastern Regions.

The JTF is made up of service men and women from the Ghana Armed Forces and the Ghana Police Service. At the start of the operation, the government placed a six-month ban on all forms of small scale mining in the country. The operation was extended from January 2018 to June 2018 because its intended objectives had not yet been achieved.

== Operations ==
When Operation Vanguard was launched, it was under the command of Colonel William Agyapong and comprised 400 service men. Governmental supervision was done through an inter-ministerial committee and the heads of the Ministries of Defence and Interior, the Chief of Defence Staff, and the Inspector General of Police. Chairman of the inter-ministerial committee, Kwabena Frimpong Boateng, informed Ghana that the task force would remain in the affected areas until the degraded lands and rivers had been restored and a reforestation programme undertaken. Personnel of the Ghana Navy and Marine Police were charged with the monitoring of the major rivers and water bodies within the operations area and were tasked with ensuring total eradication of galamsey activities in the waters.

Operations command was handed over to Colonel Michael Amoah Ayisi in January 2018. It was reported in May 2018 that 75 percent of the operation's target had been achieved.

=== Arrests and findings ===
Since the start of the operations of the JTF, many galamseyers have been arrested. Galamsey offenders are mostly Ghanaian nationals with the rest being from other West African countries and Chinese nationals. On 21 May 2018, four offenders were arrested at Asendua near Hiawa in the Amenfi Central District. Colonel Agyapong revealed that 58 different types of assault weapons had been retrieved from galamseyeres. The weapons included pistols, single and double barreled guns, and pump action guns. The guns were either locally manufactured or imported.

=== Successes ===
In December 2017 President Akuffo-Addo described the activities of Operation Vanguard as a success. He believed the nation's resources had been put to the right use and the harmful practices of the illegal miners were being eradicated. In February 2018 a spokesperson for Operation Vanguard declared that over 1,000 illegal miners had been arrested and their equipment seized. Several hundred makeshift accommodations had been destroyed. Successful operations had stopped the pollution of bodies of water, especially at Dokokyina near the Bui Dam, as well as the rivers of Birim, Ankobra, and Offin.

On 24 May 2018, John Peter Amewu, sector minister for Lands and Natural Resources in Ghana, said a total of 1,500 floating platforms had been destroyed. He hinted to the possible removal of the ban placed on small-scale mining. Companies accredited by the Minerals Commission of Ghana would be the only ones allowed to undertake small-scale mining.

=== Failures ===
Some members of the Ghanaian public believed that the activities of Operation Vanguard could not be described as a success. This was due to the caliber of offenders arrested. They believed that the galamsey kingpins were still free and would return to the act if the operations ended. A major reason why failures had persisted in certain areas was due to inaccessible terrain.

=== Punishment for offenders ===
It was reported by the commander in charge of Operation Vanguard that the punishments meted out to galamseyers were not deterrent enough. Most Ghanaian offenders were given a fine or imprisoned, while foreign nationals were deported. The fines were between 1000 and 6000 cedis. Jail terms ranged from four to eighteen months.

In May 2018, a spokesperson for the operation expressed satisfaction with the types of punishments that were being given to offenders. However, concern remained for the slow pace of convictions for foreigners caught in the act. Public Relations Officer for the operation, Squadron Leader Robinson Omane Agyei, stated that only 22 out of 172 Chinese nationals arrested had been jailed since the beginning of the operations.

== Expansion of activities ==
Due to the success of the operations, leaders of regions where Operation Vanguard was absent asked the president to include them in the operations. A new operating base was established in the Central Region. In the first few days of the establishment of the base, four offenders were arrested, including one Chinese national and three Ghanaians at Nkutumso, in the Upper Denkyira East District of the Central Region. Aside from arrests, equipment for ground excavation was seized.

== Controversies ==
Sections of the Ghanaian public have protested against the destruction of mining equipment seized from galamseyers through Operation Vanguard. Those against the practice believed the equipment could be auctioned or put to use by the government in road construction or other beneficial activities, rather than burning it. Some people have claimed that members of Operation Vanguard have been meting out selective punishment to galamseyers. Unproven allegations of bribe-taking have been leveled against some service men of the operation.

Eastern regional Minister Eric Kwakye Darfour made similar allegations against the team in December 2017. Allegations of bribery and selective justice leveled against the operation were refuted by a management member of the team. It was stated that some people had used impersonation to trick galamseyers into paying bribes. According to Operation Vanguard, such impersonators had been arrested and prosecuted.

== Suggestions ==
In 2018 it was suggested that the President of Ghana create a new national award to honour the initial 400 service personnel of Operation Vanguard. A suggested name for the award was National Environment Heritage Heroes Award.
