= Kofi Annan International Peacekeeping Training Centre =

Training and research institution in Ghana

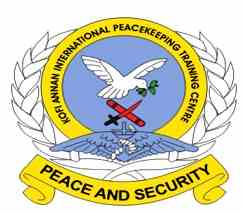
- Motto: ...where Peace begins
- Established: 1998; 28 years ago
- President: Kofi Annan
- Location: Cantonments, Greater Accra, Ghana
- Coordinates: 5.57522°N 0.11316°W
- Interactive map of Kofi Annan International Peacekeeping Training Centre
- Website: Official website

The Kofi Annan International Peacekeeping Training Centre (KAIPTC) is a training centre based in Ghana which provides training and research in peacekeeping and peaceoperations. Established in 1998, headed by Maj-Gen. Clayton Yaache, it formally began operations in 2002. KAIPTC commenced its first full annual training and education cycle in March 2004, and has since expanded its curriculum to more than twenty different courses. The Centre is one three (3) Peacekeeping Training Centres of Excellence mandated by the Economic Community of West African States (ECOWAS) to offer training in peacekeeping and Peace Support Operations (PSO) in Africa.

== Objectives ==
The Centre announces its broad objectives as:

- To provide mission oriented training at the operational level in Peace Operations for selected participants prior to deployment into areas of operation.
- To provide the operational focus that will link the basic tactical Peace Operations training provided at Koulikoro in Mali under French sponsorship with the high level strategic training provided at the War College in Nigeria.
- To improve the ability of participants to operate in multinational environments and to cooperate with contingents from other countries.
- To keep participants abreast of the nature and complexities of contemporary interstate and intrastate conflicts.
- To conduct research into the various facets of peace operations.

== International ties ==
The KAIPTC is engaged in partnerships with several research and training facilities in the world, including Canada's Pearson Peacekeeping Centre.

In addition to support from its host country, Ghana, the KAIPTC has benefited from assistance from Canada, Denmark, the European Union, France, Germany, India, Italy, Japan, the Netherlands, Norway, Spain, Sweden, Switzerland, the United Kingdom, and the United States.

== See also ==
- Ghana-India Kofi Annan Centre of Excellence in ICT
