= 5th Battalion, Ghana Regiment =

Fifth Battalion
- Active: 30 January 1961
- Country: Ghana
- Branch: Army
- Type: Infantry
- Part of: Southern Command
- Garrison/HQ: Burma Camp
- Patron: Burma

The 5th Battalion, Ghana Regiment (also known as the 5th Infantry Battalion) is a unit of the Ghana Regiment of the Ghana Army.

== History ==
The 5th Infantry Battalion originated from 5th West African Brigade Grouping in 1941. In November 1942, it came under the 81st (West Africa) Division. It concentrated in Nigeria Colony in April 1943 and was stationed in Burma from July 1943 till February 1944. It returned to the Gold Coast in autumn 1945, and was disbanded in July 1946. The unit was reformed on 30 January 1961 under British Army officer Lieutenant Colonel D. J. Cairns. He served until July 1961.

The unit structure initially consisted of:

- Battalion HQ
- Four Rifle Companies
- Support Company

The unit moved to Accra in 1968, under the command of Major L. K. Kwaku. Kwame Nkrumah. In 1968, the unit was presented with the national and regimental colours by Joseph Arthur Ankrah, the then Head of State of Ghana. The four rifle companies organization were maintained during the National Redemption Council army until 1980.

In June 2012, the battalion held a ceremony to decommission its old unit colours and consecrate new national and regimental colours.

== Battle honours ==
The battalion has received battle honours, gained for its involvement in a number of conflicts including:

- Anglo-Ashanti wars, 1873-1874
- Kamerun campaign, 1914-1916
- East African campaign, 1916–1918.

== Peacekeeping operations ==
- Congo Crisis
- United Nations Emergency Force II
- United Nations Interim Force in Lebanon
- Economic Community of West African States Monitoring Group
- United Nations Assistance Mission for Rwanda
- United Nations Transitional Authority in Cambodia
- United Nations Mission in Sierra Leone
- Operation Gongong
