= Collen Melville Richards =

British navy officer (1888–1971)

Brigadier Collen Melville Richards CBE DSO MC
- Born: Collen Edward Melville Richards; 1888
- Died: 1971 (aged 82–83)
- Military career
- Allegiance: United Kingdom
- Branch: British Army
- Service years: 1911–1946
- Rank: Brigadier
- Service number: 5049
- Commands: 5th West African Brigade (1942); 2nd (West Africa) Brigade (1941–1942); 24th (Gold Coast) Brigade (1940–1941); Royal West African Frontier Force (1939–1942); 4th Gold Coast Brigade (1939–1940); Gold Coast Regiment (1939)
- Conflicts: First World War; Second World War
- Awards: Commander of the Order of the British Empire; Distinguished Service Order; Military Cross; Officer of the Order of the Nile (Egypt)

Brigadier Collen Edward Melville Richards, CBE, DSO, MC (1888–1971) was a senior officer in the British Army who served during the First and Second World Wars.

Joining the East Lancashire Regiment in 1911, Richards served during the First World War and was awarded the Military Cross in 1916 and the Distinguished Service Order in 1919. For his "good services" during the Aliab Dinka Uprising of 1919–1920, Richards was appointed an Officer of the Order of the Nile by the Sultan of Egypt. In the Second World War, he commanded the 24th Gold Coast Brigade (12th African Division) during the East African Campaign and was appointed a Commander of the Order of the British Empire in the 1944 Birthday Honours. Richards retired from the army on 2 February 1946.

== Command history ==
- Gold Coast Regiment – 1939
- 4th Gold Coast Brigade, West Africa and East Africa – 1939 to 1940
- Royal West African Frontier Force – 1939 to 1942
- 24th (Gold Coast) Brigade, East Africa – 1940 to 1941
- 24th Gold Coast Brigade, East Africa and South Africa – 1941
- 2nd (West Africa) Brigade, West Africa – 1941 to 1942
- 5th West African Brigade, West Africa – 1942
