= Clayton Yaache =

Ghanaian military personnel

- Allegiance: Ghana
- Branch: Ghana Army
- Rank: Major General

Major General Clayton Naa Boanubah Yaache is a Ghanaian military personnel and a former Chief of Army Staff of the Ghana Army. One of Ghana's finest Military officers. Yaache led the Ghanaian contingent of UNAMIR. He would distinguish himself as sector commander of the demilitarised zone during the Rwandan Civil War. He led the emergency humanitarian cell within UNAMIR during the genocide. He served as Chief of Army Staff from February 2001 to June 2005. He also served as Ghana's Ambassador to Mali from 2005 to December 2008.
