= J. R. K. Acquah =

Ghanaian chief of Army Staff (fl. 1971)

Brigadier J. R. K. Acquah was a Ghanaian soldier and a former Chief of Army Staff of the Ghana Army. He served as Chief of Army Staff from June 1971 to October 1971.
