= Richard Opoku-Adusei =

Ghanaian military officer (born 1954)

Major General Richard Opoku-Adusei (born 24 November 1954) is a Ghanaian military officer and a former Chief of Army Staff of the Ghana Army. He served as Chief of Army Staff from 4 April 2013 – 9 Feb 2017.
