= Kobena Eyi Acquah =

Ghanaian lawyer and poet (born 1952)

- Born: 1952 (age 73–74); Winneba, Central Region, Ghana
- Education: University of Ghana
- Occupations: Lawyer; poet

Kobena Eyi Acquah (born 1952) is a Ghanaian lawyer and poet. His debut collection, The Man Who Died (1984), won the 1985 British Airways Commonwealth Prize for Poetry. The dramatized performance of his Music for a Dream Dance "remains one of the most memorable events in the recent history of the poetic scene in Ghana".

== Life ==
Kobena Eyi Acquah was born in Winneba in Ghana's Central Region. He studied at the University of Ghana, Legon, and studied law at the Ghana Law School. He has worked as a lawyer and investment counselor at the same time as pursuing his writing career. He has served on the Ghana Book Development Council and the Ghana Copyright Board, and in 1993 was president of the Ghana Association of Writers.

Acquah was influenced by Atukwei Okai, whom he first met in 1971. He has emphasised the importance of the public poetic performance of poetry, which he sees as continuing folk traditions of musical performance. With a drama group known as The Living Echoes, he has directed several dramatic performances of his poetry. An early production was a dramatization of selections from The Man Who Died. On 27 January 1988, the group performed Birth and Rebirth at the W. E. B. Du Bois Memorial Centre for Pan African Culture. On 29 July 1988, the group performed a public premiere, billed as an 'outdooring', of Music for a Dream Dance at the DuBois Centre.

== Works ==
- The Man Who Died: Poems 1974-1979, 1984
- Music for a Dream Dance, 1989
- Rivers Must Flow
- No Time for a Masterpiece: Poems, 1995
