= London Regiment =

London Regiment may refer to two infantry regiments in the British Army:

- London Regiment (1908–1938)
- London Regiment (1993–2022)
