= D. H. Tadman =

British Military Official

- Military career
- Allegiance: Ghana
- Branch: Ghana Army

Brigadier D. H. Tadman was a British military personnel and a former Chief of Army Staff of the Ghana Army.

His regiment was the King's Own Scottish Borderers.
