= President's Own Guard Regiment =

Government security regiment of Ghana's Army

- Active: 1960–present
- Country: Ghana
- Branch: Ghana Army
- Regimental Headquarters: 1st Battalion – Accra

Commanders
- Commander-in-Chief: President of Ghana, John Mahama

The President's Own Guard Regiment (POGR) is an infantry regiment of the Ghana Army (GA).

== POGR history ==
The POGR infantry regiment was founded in 1960 as the Presidential Guard Regiment following Ghana's independence when Kwame Nkrumah increased the Presidential Bodyguard from a company to a full regiment. Initially, POGR was made up of soldiers who had become unfit for operational service, and was intended to act as a ceremonial unit. However, following attempts on his life, Nkrumah ordered that the POGR be expanded and reinforced, renaming it as the President's Own Guard Regiment (POGR), and bringing it under the direct control of the Presidential Detail Department. In 1965, the POGR was removed from the command structure of the Ghana Army (GA), being accountable directly to the President of Ghana. By February 1966, the POGR consisted of two battalions and almost 1,200 officers and men, trained by Soviet advisers.

== POGR operations ==
Because of the POGR's status (it was better trained, equipped, paid and clothed than the regular Ghana army), significant resentment was directed at its military personnel, which led to violence directed against it by the Ghana Army (GA) during the coup that overthrew Kwame Nkrumah. After this, the POGR was reintegrated into the Ghana Army (GA).

Today, the POGR consists of a single battalion. The POGR's primary function remains as a bodyguard to the President of Ghana and to defend the Presidential Palace in Accra.

== See also ==
- Ghana Regiment
