= Saint Kitts and Nevis Defence Force =

Military of Saint Kitts and Nevis

- Motto: Courage
- Founded: 1896
- Current form: 1997
- Service branches: SKN Regiment; SKN Coast Guard
- Headquarters: Camp Springfield, Basseterre
- Website: Official website

Leadership
- Commander-in-Chief: Governor-General Dame Marcella Liburd as representative of Charles III as King of Saint Kitts and Nevis
- Prime Minister: Terrance Drew
- Minister of National Security: Terrance Drew
- Defence Force Commander: Lt. Col. Anthony J. Comrie

Related articles
- Ranks: Military ranks of Saint Kitts and Nevis

The Saint Kitts and Nevis Defence Force is the military of Saint Kitts and Nevis. It currently consists of an infantry unit (the St. Kitts Nevis Regiment) and a maritime unit (the St. Kitts Nevis Coast Guard). Both units have regular and reserve elements, all of which fall under the command Force Headquarters (FHQ, SKNDF). The current Commander of the SKNDF is Lt. Col. J. Anthony Comrie. The SKNDF has an active force of 300 personnel with a corps of 150 cadets.

The commander takes orders from the Minister of National Security.

== Mission ==
The primary mission of the Infantry element is the internal security of St Kitts and Nevis, in conjunction with the local police, while the Coast Guard is responsible for guarding the country's territorial waters and enforcing ecological regulations. One of the major roles of the entire organization is drug trade interception, which is often undertaken together with the local police, the United States Coast Guard, the Royal Navy, the Royal Netherlands Navy and the French Navy. The SKNDF is also used in the provision of relief after natural disasters and in overseas peacekeeping roles, principally within the Regional Security System.

== History ==
The SKNDF was originally formed as a volunteer unit in 1896 in response to riots in several sugar plantations. One such riot is commonly known as the Portuguese Riot which took place at Needsmust Estate and resulted in the destruction of a large number of properties. Therefore, the British Government determined that it was necessary to establish a local force to combat future riots until reinforcements could arrive from Great Britain. The force originally consisted of an Infantry unit and a Cavalry unit, however, the latter was later disbanded and absorbed into the Infantry.

The regular defence force did not come into being however until 1967, when it was decided that a regular army was needed following public disturbances on the island of Anguilla, which was attempting to secede from its federation with Saint Kitts and Nevis, and the determination that the existing volunteer force was not adequately trained to deal with the situation.

The first Defence's manpower came from the Royal St. Christopher and Nevis Police Force's Tactical Unit and the Special Service Unit.

The forming of the regular defence force was a major policy of the ruling Labour Party, and was adamantly opposed by the opposition People's Action Movement (PAM). When the PAM came to power in 1980, they made the decision to disband the regular force, leaving only the reserve. The election of Denzil Douglas in 1995 saw the new government reform the regulars.

== Organization ==
=== Regular Corps ===
The regular corps of the SKNDF consists of:

- Force Headquarters
- Saint Kitts and Nevis Regiment
  - Rifle Company 'A': This is the regular infantry unit of the SKNDF. It is under the command of a captain, and consists of an HQ and three rifle platoons.
  - Support and Services Platoon: This is the administrative and logistics element, and includes two other individual units:
    - The Agricultural Corps
- Coast Guard: This is the marine element, and is divided into three sub-units:
  - CG Headquarters
  - Engineer Unit
  - Flotilla – this is responsible for the operation of the five vessels of the Coast Guard.

The Coast Guard's lone off-shore patrol vessel was donated by the United States

=== Reserve Corps ===
The reserve corps of the SKNDF consists of:

- Rifle Company 'B': This is the reserve infantry unit, and mirrors 'A' Company in structure.
- Coast Guard reserve: This provides reserves for the Coast Guard.
- St Kitts and Nevis Defence Force Band: The Saint Kitts and Nevis Defence Force Band founded in the early 1930s and serves as the official military band of the country. It has varied in size over the years, from a low of 15 to a high of 48. A subunit of the Band is the Corps of Drums. The band is led by a Director of Music, which is currently Captain Sylvester Charles.
- St Kitts and Nevis Defence Force Cadet Corps: consisting of 150 cadets (80 senior & 70 junior)

== Equipment ==
- 3x Daimler Ferret FV-702 4x4 Armored Reconnaissance Vehicle (ARV) United Kingdom
- Land Rover Defender 4x4 United Kingdom
- Sterling L2A3 9mm SubMachine Gun (SMG) United Kingdom
- FN FAL 50-00 Belgium
  - L1A1 Self-Loading Rifle 7.62mm Semi-Automatic Rifle (SAR) United Kingdom
- FN-MAG 7.62mm Light Machine Gun (LMG) Belgium
- L16A1 81mm Mortar United Kingdom
- M16A4 5.56mm NATO Assault Rifle United States
- M16A3 5.56mm NATO Assault Rifle United States
- M16A2 5.56mm NATO Assault Rifle United States
- M4A1 5.56mm NATO Carbine United States

== Facilities ==
- Kitts and Nevis Defence Headquarters Building at Camp Springfield
- Coast Guard Base at Bird Rock
- Bath Village

== See also ==
- Regional Security System
