= Babina, Uttar Pradesh =

Babina
- Cantonment town
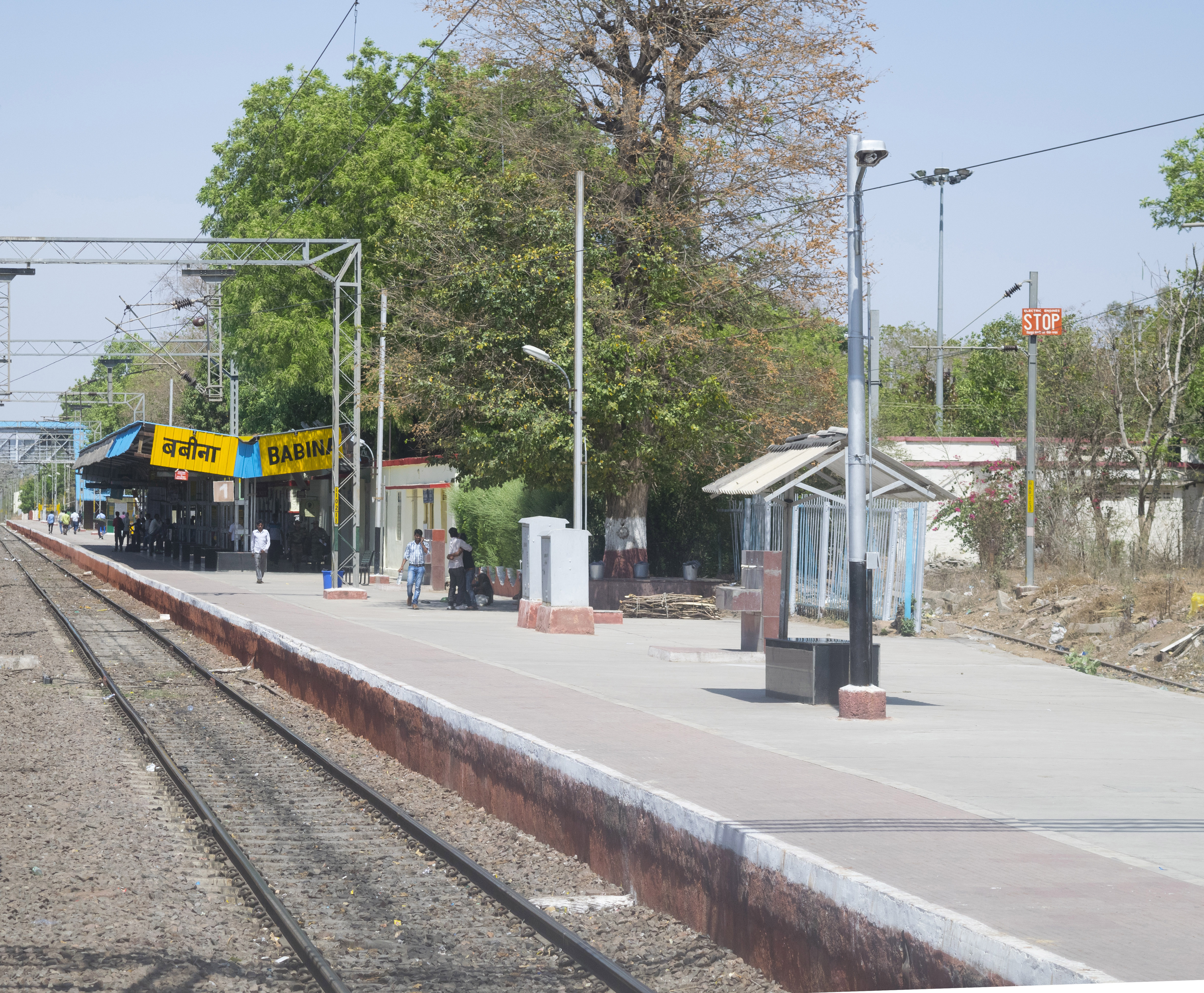
- Babina Railway Station PF1

- Location in Uttar Pradesh, India Babina (India)
- Coordinates: 25.25°N 78.47°E
- Country: India
- State: Uttar Pradesh
- District: Jhansi
- Elevation: 303 m (994 ft)

Population (2001)
  - Total: 35,542

Languages
  - Official: Hindi
- Time zone: UTC+5:30 (IST)
- Postal code: 284401
- Vehicle registration: UP

Babina is a cantonment town in Jhansi district in the state of Uttar Pradesh, India. Shree Rajeev Singh Parichha is MLA of Babina constituency.

== Etymology ==
It is said that Babina is an anacronym originating from "British Army Base in North Asia". While this has been endorsed by the Cantonment Board of Babina, it appears to be a backronym that has been endorsed without due verification. Contrary to what the alleged anacronym suggests, the cantonment at Babina had no association with the British Raj and was opened in 1959, 12 years after the British left India. Furthermore, India is considered to be a part of South Asia, not North Asia as the acronym suggests. This suggests that the popular anacronym is very likely a modern invention.

== Indian Army ==
Jhansi district is the headquarters of the 31st Indian Armoured Division, stationed at Jhansi-Babina. It is an armored division which has equipment like M3 Lee [Historian] and M4 Sherman tanks [Historian]. There was a joint exercise in 2012 with the Singaporean Army at Jhansi witnessed by the President of India, Pratibha Patil. In 2019 the Indian army held a joint exercise with the Russian army at Babina Battlefield, involving T-90, 'Arjun', and T-72 tanks.

== Geography ==
Babina is located at 25.25°N 78.47°E. It has an average elevation of 303 metres (994 feet).

Sukma Dukma Dam is located on the Betwa River in Babina, Jhansi district, Uttar Pradesh. The dam is 800 metres in length and was constructed during the British era. It is a local picnic spot, with increased visitor numbers during the monsoon season when the dam overflows.

== Demographics ==
As of the 2011 Census of India, Babina had a population of 35,165. Males constitute 62% of the population and females 38%. Babina has an average literacy rate of 73%, higher than the national average of 59.5%; with 69% of the males and 31% of females literate. 13% of the population is under 6 years of age.
