= Henry Templer Alexander =

British Army general (1911–1977)

Major-General Henry Templer Alexander CB CBE DSO
- Alexander in 1962
- Born: 17 May 1911
- Died: 16 March 1977 (aged 65)
- Military career
- Allegiance: United Kingdom
- Branch: British Army; Ghana Army
- Service years: 1931–1965
- Rank: Major-General
- Service number: 52569
- Unit: Cameronians (Scottish Rifles)
- Commands: Chief of the Defence Staff (Ghana); Cameronians (Scottish Rifles)
- Conflicts: World War II

Major-General Henry Templer Alexander, CB, CBE, DSO (17 May 1911 – 16 March 1977) was a British Army officer who served as Chief of Defence Staff of the Ghana Armed Forces between 1960 and 1961.

== Early life ==
Alexander was born on 17 May 1911. He was the son of Major General H. L. Alexander, CB, CMG, DSO, and Dorothy Alexander. He was educated at Sedbergh School, Yorkshire, then an all-boys public school.

== Military career ==
On 27 August 1931, having attended the Royal Military College, Sandhurst, Alexander was commissioned into the Cameronians (Scottish Rifles) as a second lieutenant. He was promoted in 1934 as a lieutenant. In 1939, he was promoted to the rank of Captain. He then served as an instructor at the Royal Military College, Sandhurst for two years. Between 1939 and 1945, he saw action in the Second World War in North Africa, Italy, India, Burma, and North West Europe. He was promoted Major in 1943 and Commanding Officer, 2 Battalion, Cameronians (Scottish Rifles) in Italy in 1944. He has also served as Chief Instructor, School of Combined Operations, 1946–1947 and General Staff Officer 1 first at Hong Kong, 1948–1950, then at Camberley, Surrey.

Alexander became a Colonel in 1954 and was appointed Commanding Officer, 1 Battalion, Cameronians (Scottish Rifles) between 1954 and 1955 and he also commanded 26th Gurkha Infantry Brigade in Malaya between 1955 and 1957. Between 1958 and 1960, he served as Senior Instructor, Staff College, Camberley, Surrey, Brigade General Staff, Department of the Chief of the Imperial General Staff, War Office and at the Imperial Defence College.

Between 1960 and 1961, he worked with the Ghana Armed Forces as Chief of Defence Staff. During that period, he commanded the Ghanaian contingent of Operation des Nations Unies au Congo, the UN force in the newly independent Congo. Upon the initial Congolese request for assistance, before the approval for deployment of UN forces, Alexander flew into Leopoldville with a single Ghanaian platoon. The Ghanaian troops were subsequently 're-hatted' as UN forces rather than under bilateral terms, and augmented.

In 1961 the remaining British Army personnel left Ghana and Major-General Stephen Otu succeeded Alexander.

From 1962 until his retirement Alexander served as Chief of Staff of Northern Command.

== Later life ==
Alexander retired in 1965. In 1968 he served as an Observer with the International Observer Team on Genocide in Nigeria.

== Honours and decorations ==
- 1943 - MBE
- 1945 - OBE
- 1957 - DSO
- 1960 - CBE
- 1961 awarded CB

== Publications ==
- African tightrope: My two years as Nkrumah's Chief of Staff (Pall Mall Press, London, 1965).

Military offices
New title	Chief of Defence Staff; 1960–1961	Succeeded by Major General Stephen J. A. Otu
Preceded by Major General A. G. V. Paley; General Officer Commanding the Ghana Regiment of Infantry	Ghana Army Commander; 1960–1961	Succeeded by Lieutenant General Joseph Ankrah
