= Ghana Regiment =

Ghana Army infantry unit

Ghana Regiment of Infantry
- Active: 1879–Present
- Country: Ghana
- Branch: Ghana Army
- Type: Line Infantry
- Role: Light Infantry
- Size: Six Battalions
- Garrison/HQ: RHQ – Accra; 1st Battalion – Tema; 2nd Battalion – Takoradi; 3rd Battalion – Sunyani; 4th Battalion – Kumasi; 5th Battalion – Accra; 6th Battalion – Tamale
- Engagements: World War I: East African Campaign; Togoland Campaign; Kamerun campaign; World War II: East African Campaign; Burma Campaign; United Nations Mission in Liberia

Commanders
- Colonel-in-Chief: President of Ghana

The Ghana Regiment is an infantry regiment that forms the main fighting element of the Ghanaian Army (GA).

== History ==
The regiment was formed in 1879 as the Gold Coast Constabulary, from personnel of the Hausa Constabulary of Southern Nigeria, to perform internal security and police duties in the British colony of the Gold Coast. In this guise, the regiment earned its first battle honour as part of the Ashanti campaign.

The Gold Coast Constabulary was renamed in 1901 as the Gold Coast Regiment, following the foundation of the West African Frontier Force, under the direction of the Colonial Office of the British Government. The regiment raised a total of five battalions for service during the First World War, all of which served during the East Africa campaign. During the Second World War, the regiment raised nine battalions, and saw action in Kenya's Northern Frontier District, Italian Somaliland, Abyssinia and Burma as part of the 82nd West African Division, the 24th Gold Coast Brigade, and the 2nd (West Africa) Infantry Brigade. The age of soldiers enlisted into the military could vary greatly between 7 and 50 years, whereas the majority (90 per cent) was between 18 and 30 years.

In 1957, the Gold Coast became the first sub-Saharan nation to be granted independence from Great Britain. In 1959, the Gold Coast Military Forces, including the Gold Coast Regiment, were withdrawn from the Royal West African Frontier Force. With the country's change of name to Ghana, the regiment was renamed the Ghana Regiment.

== Present form ==
Today, the regiment forms the bulk of the Ghanaian Army, with a total of six battalions, divided equally between the army's two brigades. As the army's main force, it is responsible for Ghanaian internal security and defence. Ghana also makes a large commitment to peacekeeping operations in the region and overseas, most notably in Sierra Leone and Liberia, for which the Ghana Regiment provides the majority of personnel. The Ghana Regiment follows the British Army closely in kit, traditions and training, and are generally well-regarded by their Western European and North American peers whilst on UN deployments and joint-operations.

== Battle honours ==
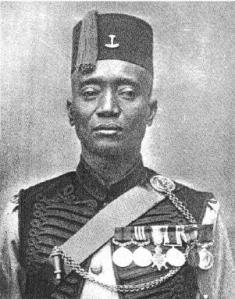
Alhaji Grunshi fired the first British shot of the First World War

- Ashantee 1873–1874^{1}, Ashanti 1900
- The Great War

(5 battalions): Narungombe, East Africa 1916–18, Kamina, Duala, Cameroons 1914–16

- The Second World War

Wal Garis, El Wak, Juba, Bulo Erillo, Gelib, Alessandra, Wadara, Abyssinia 1940–41, North Arakan, Kaladan, Tinma, Mayu Valley, Myohaung, Arakan Beaches, Kangaw, Taungup, Burma 1943–45

1. Awarded for service of Hausa Constabulary.

== See also ==
- President's Own Guard Regiment
- 81st (West Africa) Division
- Native Officer Ali

== Alliances ==
- United Kingdom – The Rifles; 1st Bn
