= Ghana Army =

- Founded: 29 July 1959 (66 years ago)
- Country: Ghana
- Type: Army
- Role: Ground Warfare
- Part of: Ghana Armed Forces
- Colors: Scarlet, Black and Dartmouth Green

Commanders
- Chief of the Defence Staff: Lt. General William Agyapong
- Chief of the Army Staff: Major General Lawrence Kwaku Gbetanu

The Ghana Army is the principal land warfare force of Ghana. In 1959, two years after the Gold Coast became independent from the British Empire, the Gold Coast Regiment was withdrawn from the Royal West African Frontier Force and formed the basis for the new Ghanaian army. Together with the Ghana Air Force and Ghana Navy, the Ghana Army makes up the Ghana Armed Forces, which is controlled by the Ghanaian Ministry of Defence and Central Defence Headquarters, both of which are located in the Greater Accra Region.

== History ==
The command structure for the army forces in Ghana originally stemmed from the British Army's West Africa Command. Lieutenant General Lashmer Whistler was the penultimate commander holding the command from 1951 to 1953. Lt Gen Sir Otway Herbert, who left the West Africa Command in 1955, was the last commander. The command was dissolved on 1 July 1956.

In 1957, the Ghana Army consisted of its headquarters, support services, three battalions of infantry and a reconnaissance squadron with armoured cars. Total strength was approximately 5,700 men. Partially due to an over-supply of British officers after the end of the Second World War, only 12 per cent of the officer corps in Ghana, 29 officers out of 209, were black Ghanaians at independence. Under Major General Alexander Paley, there were almost 200 British Ghanaian officers and 230 warrant officers and senior commissioned officers posted throughout the Ghanaian Army.

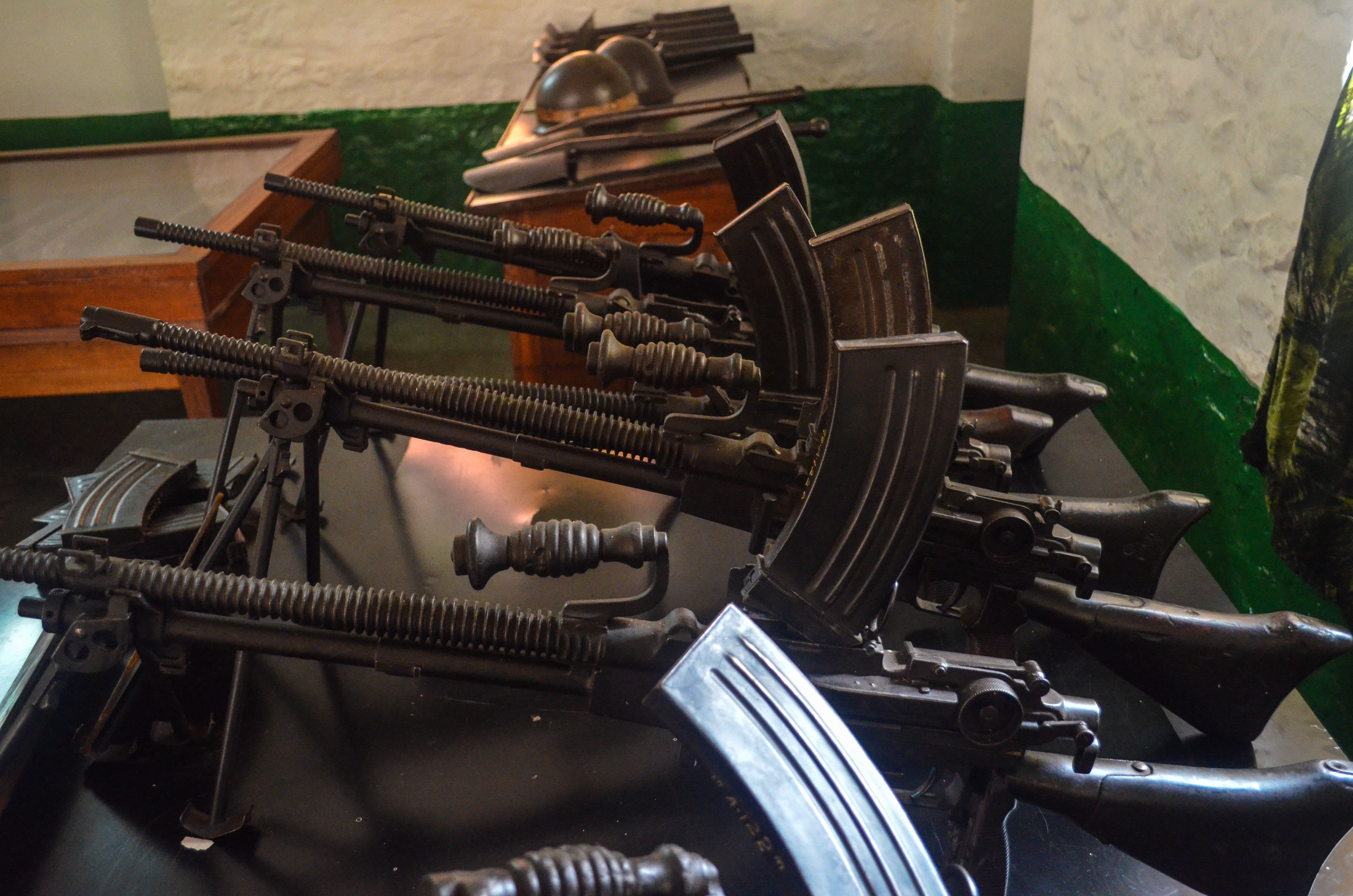
Trophies taken by Gold Coast troops from Japanese forces in Burma during the Second World War

The Ghanaian Prime Minister, Kwame Nkrumah, wished to rapidly expand and Africanise the army to support his Pan-African and anti-colonial ambitions. In 1961, the 4th and 5th Battalions were established and the 6th Battalion in 1964, from a parachute unit originally raised in 1963. The Second Infantry Brigade Group was established in 1961 to command the two battalions raised that year. The 3rd Battalion was disbanded in February 1961 after a mutiny in August 1960 while on Operation des Nations Unies au Congo service at Tshikapa in the Democratic Republic of the Congo. The changeover from British to Ghanaian officers meant a sudden lowering of experience levels, training and professionalism.

The Ghanaian commanding officer of 3rd Battalion, Lieutenant Colonel David Hansen, had on appointment as battalion commander only seven years of military experience, compared to the more normal twenty years' for battalion commanders in Western armies. He was badly beaten by his troops during the mutiny. The 4th Battalion was raised under a British commanding officer, Lieutenant Colonel Douglas Cairns, from the company of the 3rd Battalion that had not mutinied. Initial British planning by Paley before his departure in 1959 had provided for all British officers to be withdrawn by 1970. Under pressure from Nkrumah, Paley's successor Major General Henry Alexander revised the plans, for all British personnel to depart by 1962. In September 1961, Alexander and all other British officers and men serving with the Ghanaian armed forces were abruptly dismissed. Nkrumah was determined fully to create all-Ghanaian armed forces, after some years of accelerated promotion of Ghanaian personnel.

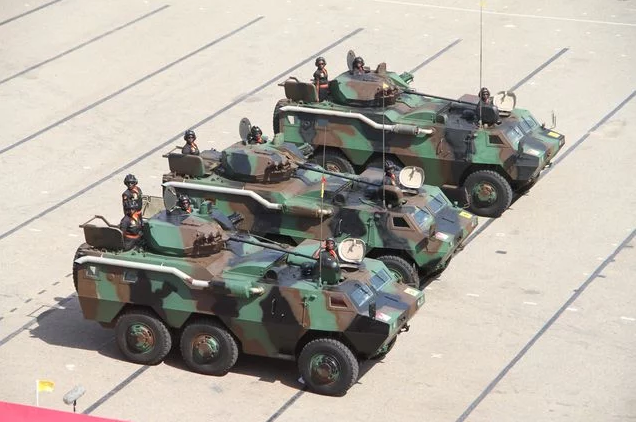
Ghanaian WZ523 armoured personnel carriers on parade.

Simon Baynham says that "the wholesale shambles which surely must have resulted from simply expelling the expatriate contract and seconded officers was averted by the arrival of Canadian military technicians and training officers". Canadian training team personnel were assigned to the Military Academy (1961−1968), the Military Hospital, as Brigade Training Officers (1961−1968), to the air force and later the Ministry of Defence (1963−1968), Ghana Army Headquarters (1963−1968) and the Airborne School.

Matters deteriorated further after the coup that deposed Nkrumah. Colonel James Bond, the Canadian military attaché, asked to write a report on how Canada could further assist the Ghanaian armed forces, wrote that "during 1966 the preoccupation of.. senior officers with their civilian duties as members of the National Liberation Council and as regional administrators, resulted in an unconscious neglect of the welfare of the Army". Able intermediate level officers had been assigned civilian administrative duties, leaving the army short.

Ghana has contributed forces to numerous UN and ECOWAS operations, including in the Balkans, Afghanistan, Democratic Republic of the Congo, Lebanon and Liberia (ECOMOG and UNMIL). Ghana contributed UN peacekeeping in UNAMIR during the Rwandan genocide. In his book Shake Hands with the Devil, Canadian UNAMIR Force Commander Romeo Dallaire gave the Ghanaian soldiers high praise for their work during the conflict, in which the Ghanaian contingent lost three soldiers. In accordance with an official statement issued on Wednesday, 22 March 2000 by the Secretary to the President, the commanders of the 1st Infantry Brigade Group in the south and the 2nd Infantry Brigade Group in the north were appointed General Officers Commanding the Southern and the Northern Commands of the Ghana Army.

== Structure ==
Infantry battalions of the Ghana Army

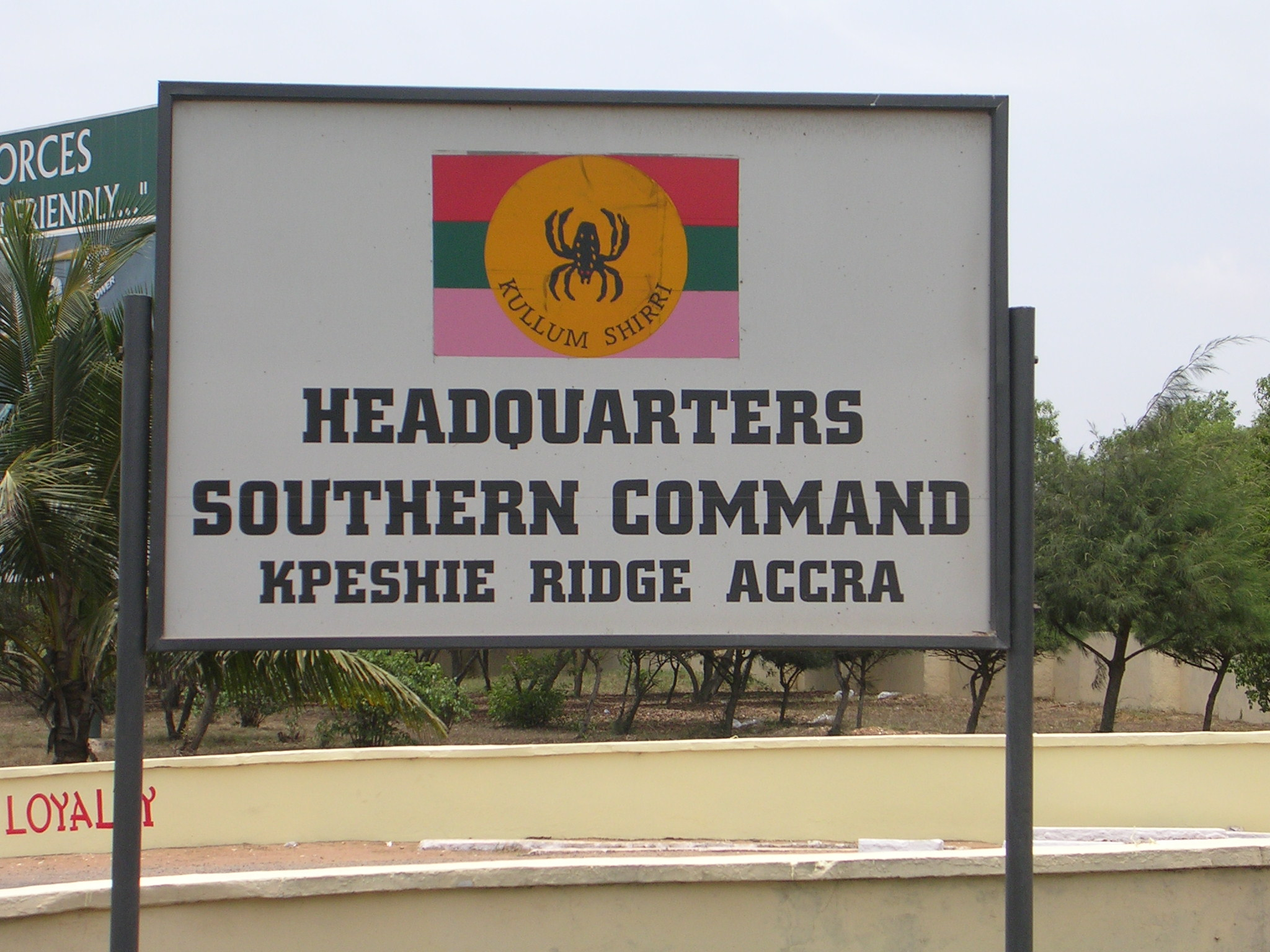
Gate sign at Headquarters Southern Command, Teshie Ridge, Accra

The Ghana army is divided into three brigade sized "commands":

- Northern Command (Tamale)
  - 6th Battalion, Ghana Regiment
  - 69th Airborne Force (One company sized formation each in Upper West and Upper East regions respectively).
  - 155th Armoured Recce Regiment (planned)
- Central Command (Kumasi)
  - 3rd Battalion, Ghana Regiment (Sunyani)
  - 4th Battalion, Ghana Regiment (Kumasi)
  - 154th Armoured Reconnaissance Regiment (Sunyani)
  - 2nd Signal Squadron (Kumasi)
  - 2nd Field Workshop (Kumasi)
  - 49th Engineer Regiment (Kumasi)
  - 2nd Field Ambulance (Kumasi)
  - 2nd Transport Company (Kumasi)
  - 2nd Field Operations Center (Kumasi)
- Southern Command (Teshie Ridge, Accra)
  - 1st Battalion, Ghana Regiment (Michel Camp, Tema)
  - 2nd Battalion, Ghana Regiment (Takoradi)
  - 5th Battalion, Ghana Regiment (Accra)
  - 64th Infantry Regiment (Accra)
  - 153rd Armoured Reconnaissance Regiment (Accra)
  - 66th Artillery Regiment (Ho)
  - 48th Engineer Regiment (Teshie)
  - 1st Field Workshop (Accra)
  - 1 Motor Transport Battalion (Accra)

== Infantry ==
The Ghanaian Army consists of three distinct infantry elements:

- Ghana Regiment – The major element of the army is the six light infantry battalions of the Ghana Regiment. Three battalions are assigned to each brigade.
- Airborne Force – The Airborne Force (ABF) is a battalion sized formation including a parachute trained company assigned to the Northern Command.
- 64 Infantry Regiment – 64 Infantry Regiment is the commando trained rapid reaction force assigned to the Southern Command (formerly known as President's Own Guard Regiment).

== Combat support and service support ==
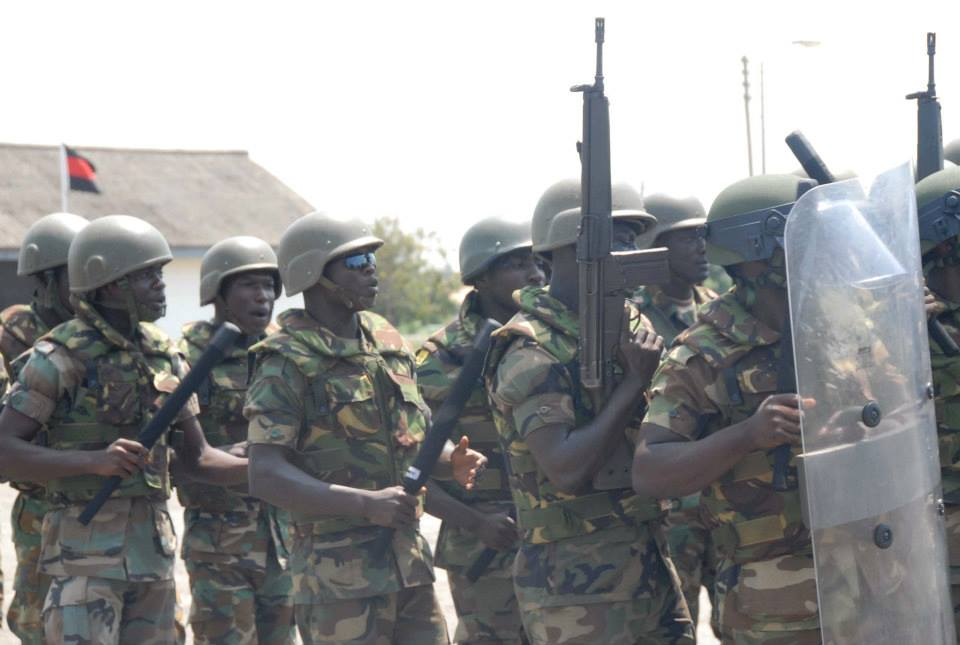
Ghanaian combat engineers assemble in a riot control formation known as a "flying wedge".

The Ghanaian Army has a number of combat support units, including its armour, artillery, engineers and signals:

- Reconnaissance Armoured Regiment
- 154 Armoured Reconnaissance Regiment (founded in 2020)
- 48 Engineer Regiment (Teshie, Greater Accra Region)
- 49 Engineer Regiment
- 66 Artillery Regiment (Volta Barracks, Ho; formed 2004 from previous Medium Mortar Regiment)
- Signals Regiment (Accra)
- Logistics Group

Other combat service support units are part of the Support Services Brigade.

== Rank structure ==
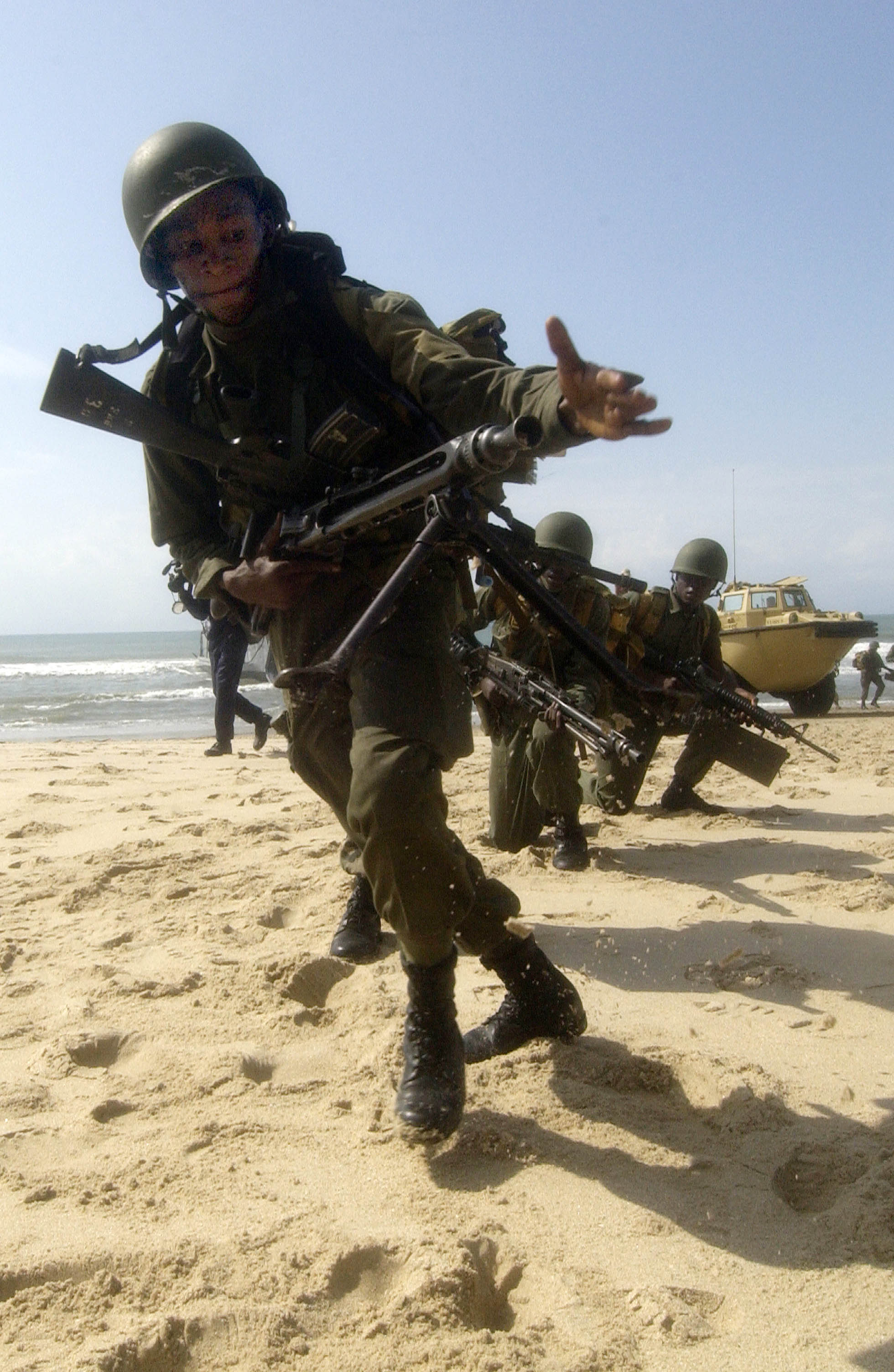
A Ghanaian Army sergeant directs his troops forward

The GA rank structure is similar to the British army ranks structure.

Commissioned officers

Rank group	General / flag officers					Senior officers			Junior officers
Ghana Army
Ghana Army	Field marshal	General	Lieutenant general	Major general	Brigadier	Colonel	Lieutenant colonel	Major	Captain	Lieutenant	Second lieutenant

Enlisted

Rank group	Senior NCOs				Junior NCOs		Enlisted
Ghana Army							No insignia
Ghana Army	Warrant officer class 1	Warrant officer class 2	Staff sergeant	Sergeant	Corporal	Lance corporal	Private (or equivalent)

== External sources ==
- Official Website of the Ghana Armed Forces
- Media related to Ghana Army at Wikimedia Commons
