= History of Ghana (1966–1979) =

Second Republic of Ghana Ghana
- 1966–1979
- Flag Coat of arms

- Capital: Accra
- Government: Parliamentary republic under a military dictatorship
- President
  - 1966-1969: Joseph Ankrah
  - 1969-1970: Akwasi Afrifa
  - 1970: Nii Amaa Ollennu
  - 1970-1972: Edward Akufo-Addo
  - 1972-1978: Ignatius Acheampong
  - 1978-1979: Fred Akuffo
- Prime Minister
  - 1969-1972: Kofi Abrefa Busia
- Legislature: Parliament of Ghana
- History
  - Established: 24 February 1966
  - 1969 Ghanaian parliamentary election: 29 August 1969
  - National Redemption Council seizes power: 13 January 1972
  - Supreme Military Council seizes power: 9 October 1975
  - Disestablishment: 4 June 1979
Preceded by	Succeeded by
First Republic of Ghana	Third Republic of Ghana
- Today part of: Ghana

From 1966 to 1979, the nation of Ghana underwent a turbulent era as the Second Republic of Ghana. It began when the government of Kwame Nkrumah was overthrown on February 24, 1966 by a military coup (one which may have been foreseen by the US government).

After the coup, the National Liberation Council (NLC) took control of the country of Ghana, and Joseph Ankrah officially was the country's president. The council eventually assembled another government and held the 1969 Ghanaian parliamentary election. This led to the government of Kofi Busia, who led the Progress Party.

In January 1972, Ghana's government was overthrown again. This led to yet another government run by the National Redemption Council (NRC), which reorganized into the Supreme Military Council (SMC) in 1975.

In 1979, the SMC was overthrown yet again in the 1979 Ghanaian coup d'état, leading to the Armed Forces Revolutionary Council.

== 1966 military coup ==
On February 24, 1966, the government of Kwame Nkrumah was overthrown in a military coup d'état. Leaders of the established coup, including army officers Colonel E.K. Kotoka, Major A. A. Afrifa, Lieutenant General (retired) J. A. Ankrah, and Police Inspector General J.W.K. Harlley, justified their takeover by charging that the CPP administration was abusive and corrupt. They were equally disturbed by Kwame Nkrumah's aggressive involvement in African politics and by his belief that Ghanaian troops could be sent anywhere in Africa to fight so-called liberation wars, even though they never did so. Above all, they pointed to the absence of democratic practices in the nation—a situation they claimed had affected the morale of the armed forces. According to General Kotoka, the military coup of 1966 was a nationalist one because it liberated the nation from Nkrumah's dictatorship—a declaration that was supported by Alex Quaison Sackey, Nkrumah's former minister of foreign affairs.

Despite the vast political changes that were brought about by the overthrow of Kwame Nkrumah, a number of problems remained. For example, the underlying ethnic and regional divisions within the society had to be addressed. The apparent spirit of national unity that seemed to have developed during the Nkrumah years turned out to have resulted in part from his coercive powers as well as from his charisma. As a consequence, successive new leaders faced the problem of forging disparate personal, ethnic, and sectional interests into a nation with shared identity and interests. The economic burdens, aggravated by what some described as past extravagance, crippled each future government's ability to foster the rapid development needed to satisfy even minimal popular demands for a better life. The fear of a resurgence of a strong central authority continued to dominate the constitutional agenda and to pervade the thinking of a number of educated, politically minded Ghanaians. Others, however, felt that a strong government was essential.

A considerable portion of the population had become convinced that effective, honest government was incompatible with competitive political parties. Multiple Ghanaians remained committed to non-political leadership for the nation, even in the form of military rule. The problems of the Busia administration, the country's first elected government after Nkrumah's fall, illustrated the problems Ghana would continue to face.

=== US/CIA knowledge of the coup ===
Documents released in November 1999 in Foreign Relations of the United States, the United States Government's ongoing official history of American foreign policy, revealed that the United States government was aware of plans to overthrow Nkrumah's government. This was corroborated by a former CIA case officer, John Stockwell, in his memoir, In Search of Enemies: A CIA Story.

== National Liberation Council and the Busia years (1966–1971) ==
The leaders of the coup that overthrew Nkrumah immediately opened the country's borders and its prison gates to allow the return from exile or release from preventive detention of all opponents of Nkrumah. The National Liberation Council (NLC), composed of four army officers and four police officers, assumed executive power. It appointed a cabinet of civil servants and promised to restore democratic government as quickly as possible. The ban on the formation of political parties remained in force until late 1968, but activity by individual figures began much earlier with the appointment of a succession of committees composed of civil servants and politicians as the first step in the return to civilian and representative rule.

These moves culminated in the appointment of a representative assembly to draft a constitution for the Second Republic of Ghana. Political party activity was allowed to commence with the opening of the assembly. By election time in August 1969, the first competitive nationwide political contest since 1956, five parties had been organized. The assembly produced a document providing for a parliamentary republic with a president as head of state and a prime minister as head of government. Largely in response to Nkrumah's authoritarian excesses, the president's powers were greatly reduced, to a point almost entirely ceremonial. Real power rested with the prime minister and cabinet.

=== 1969 election ===
The major contenders were the Progress Party (PP), headed by Kofi A. Busia, and the National Alliance of Liberals (NAL), led by Komla A. Gbedemah. Critics associated these two leading parties with the political divisions of the early Nkrumah years. The PP found much of its support among the old opponents of Nkrumah's CPP - the educated middle class and traditionalists of Ashanti Region and the North. This link was strengthened by the fact that Busia had headed the NLM and its successor, the UP, before fleeing the country to oppose Nkrumah from exile. Similarly, the NAL was seen as the successor of the CPP's right wing, which Gbedemah had headed until he was ousted by Nkrumah in 1961.

The elections demonstrated an interesting voting pattern. For example, the PP carried all the seats among the Asante and the Brong. All seats in the northern regions of the country were closely contested. In the Volta Region, the PP won some Ewe seats, while the NAL won all seats in the non-Ewe northern section. Overall, the PP gained 59 per cent of the popular vote and 74 per cent of the seats in the National Assembly. The PP's victories demonstrated some support among nearly all the ethnic groups. An estimated 60 per cent of the electorate voted.

=== Busia government ===
Immediately after the elections, Gbedemah was barred from taking his seat in the National Assembly by a Supreme Court decision involving those CPP members who had been accused of financial crimes. Gbedemah retired permanently from active participation in politics. The NAL, left without a strong leader, controlled thirty seats; in October 1970, it absorbed the members of three other minor parties in the assembly to form the Justice Party (JP) under the leadership of Joseph Appiah. Their combined strength constituted what amounted to a southern bloc with a solid constituency among most of the Ewe and the peoples of the coastal cities.

Busia, the PP leader in both parliament and the nation, became prime minister when the National Assembly met in September. An interim three-member presidential commission, composed of Major Afrifa, Police Inspector General Harlley of the NLC, and the chief of the defense staff, Major General A.K. Ocran, served in place of an elected president for the first year and a half of civilian rule. The commission dissolved itself in August 1970. Before stepping down, Afrifa criticized the constitution, particularly provisions that served more as a bar to the rise of a dictator than as a blueprint for an effective, decisive government. The electoral college chose as president Chief Justice Edward Akufo Addo, one of the leading nationalist politicians of the UGCC era and one of the judges dismissed by Nkrumah in 1964.

All attention, however, remained focused on Prime Minister Busia and his government. Much was expected of the Busia administration, because its parliamentarians were considered intellectuals and, therefore, more perceptive in their evaluations of what needed to be done. Some Ghanaians hoped that their decisions would be in the general interest of the nation, as compared with those made by the Nkrumah administration, which were judged to satisfy narrow party interests and, more important, Nkrumah's personal agenda. The NLC had given assurances that there would be more democracy, more political maturity, and more freedom in Ghana, because the politicians allowed to run for the 1969 elections were proponents of Western democracy. In fact, these were the same individuals who had suffered under the old regime and were, therefore, thought to understand the benefits of democracy.

Two early measures initiated by the Busia government were the expulsion of large numbers of non-citizens from the country and a companion measure to limit foreign involvement in small businesses. The moves were aimed at relieving the unemployment created by the country's precarious economic situation. The policies were popular because they forced out of the retail sector of the economy those foreigners, especially Lebanese, Asians, and Nigerians, who were perceived as unfairly monopolizing trade to the disadvantage of Ghanaians. A number of other Busia moves, however, were not popular. Busia's decision to introduce a loan program for university students, who had hitherto received free education, was challenged because it was interpreted as introducing a class system into the country's highest institutions of learning. Some observers even saw Busia's devaluation of the national currency and his encouragement of foreign investment in the industrial sector of the economy as conservative ideas that could undermine Ghana's sovereignty.

The opposition Justice Party's basic policies did not differ significantly from those of the Busia administration. Still, the party attempted to stress the importance of the central government rather than that of limited private enterprise in economic development, and it continued to emphasize programs of primary interest to the urban work force. The ruling PP emphasized the need for development in rural areas, both to slow the movement of population to the cities and to redress regional imbalance in levels of development. The JP and a growing number of PP members favoured suspension of payment on some Foreign Debts of the Nkrumah era. This attitude grew more popular as debt payments became more difficult to meet. Both parties favoured creation of a West African economic community or an economic union with the neighbouring West African states.

== National Redemption Council (1972 – 1975) ==
=== 1972 coup and background ===
Despite broad popular support garnered at its inception and strong foreign connections, the Busia government fell victim to an army coup within twenty-seven months. Neither ethnic nor class differences played a role in the overthrow of the PP government. The crucial causes were the country's continuing economic difficulties, both those stemming from the high foreign debts incurred by Nkrumah and those resulting from internal problems. The PP government had inherited US$580 million in medium- and long-term debts, an amount equal to 25 per cent of the gross domestic product of 1969. By 1971 the US$580 million had been further inflated by US$72 million in accrued interest payments and US$296 million in short-term commercial credits. Within the country, an even larger internal debt fueled inflation.

Ghana's economy remained largely dependent upon the often difficult cultivation of and market for cocoa. Cocoa prices had always been volatile, but exports of this tropical crop normally provided about half of the country's foreign currency earnings. Beginning in the 1960s, however, a number of factors combined to limit severely this vital source of national income. These factors included foreign competition (particularly from neighbouring Côte d'Ivoire), a lack of understanding of free-market forces (by the government in setting prices paid to farmers), accusations of bureaucratic incompetence in the Cocoa Marketing Board, and the smuggling of crops into Côte d'Ivoire. As a result, Ghana's income from cocoa exports continued to fall dramatically.

Austerity measures imposed by the Busia administration alienated influential Farmers, who until then had been PP supporters. These measures were part of Busia's economic structural adjustment efforts to put the country on a sounder financial base. The austerity programs had been recommended by the International Monetary Fund. The recovery measures also severely affected the middle class and the salaried work force, both of which faced wage freezes, tax increases, currency devaluations, and rising import prices. These measures precipitated protests from the Trade Union Congress. In response, the government sent the army to occupy the trade union headquarters and to block strike actions—a situation that some perceived as negating the government's claim to be operating democratically.

The army troops and officers upon whom Busia relied for support were themselves affected, both in their personal lives and in the tightening of the defence budget, by these same austerity measures. As the leader of the anti-Busia coup declared on 13 January 1972, even those amenities enjoyed by the army during the Nkrumah regime were no longer available. Knowing that austerity had alienated the officers, the Busia government began to change the leadership of the army's combat elements. This, however, was the last straw. Lieutenant Colonel Ignatius Kutu Acheampong, temporarily commanding the First Brigade around Accra, led a bloodless coup that ended the Second Republic.

=== National Redemption Council years ===
Despite its short existence, the Second Republic was significant in that the development problems the nation faced came clearly into focus. These included uneven distribution of investment funds and favouritism toward certain groups and regions. Furthermore, important questions about developmental priorities emerged. For example, was rural development more important than the needs of the urban population? Or, to what extent was the government to incur the cost of university education? And more important, was the public to be drawn into the debate about the nation's future? The impact of the fall of Ghana's Second Republic cast a shadow across the nation's political future because no clear answers to these problems emerged.

According to one writer, the overthrow of the PP government revealed that Ghana was no longer the pace-setter in Africa's search for workable political institutions. Both the radical left and the conservative right had failed. In opposing Nkrumah's one-party state, Busia allegedly argued that socialist rule in Ghana had led to unemployment and poverty for some while party officials grew richer at the expense of the masses. But in justifying the one-party state, Nkrumah pointed to the weaknesses of multi-party parliamentary democracy, a system that delayed decision-making processes and, therefore, the ability to take action to foster development. The fall of both the Nkrumah and the Busia regimes seemed to have confused many with regard to the political direction the nation needed to take. In other words, in the first few years after the Nkrumah administration, Ghanaians were unable to arrive at a consensus on the type of government suited to address their national problems.

It was this situation—the inability of the PP government to satisfy diverse interest groups—that ostensibly gave Acheampong an excuse for the 13 January takeover. Acheampong's National Redemption Council (NRC) claimed that it had to act to remove the ill effects of the currency devaluation of the previous government and thereby, at least in the short run, to improve living conditions for individual Ghanaians. Under the circumstances, the NRC was compelled to take immediate measures. Although committed to the reversal of the fiscal policies of the PP government, the NRC, by comparison, adopted policies that appeared painless and, therefore, popular. But unlike the coup leaders of the NLC, members of the NRC did not outline any plan for the return of the nation to democratic rule. Some observers accused the NRC of acting simply to rectify their own grievances. To justify their takeover, coup leaders leveled charges of corruption against Busia and his ministers. In its first years, the NRC drew support from a public pleased by the reversal of Busia's austerity measures. The Ghanaian currency was revalued upward, and two moves were announced to lessen the burden of existing foreign debts: the repudiation of US$90 million of Nkrumah's debts to British companies, and the unilateral rescheduling of the rest of the country's debts for payment over fifty years. Later, the NRC nationalized all large foreign-owned companies. But these measures, while instantly popular in the streets, did nothing to solve the country's real problems. If anything, they aggravated the problem of capital flow.

Unlike the NLC of 1966, the NRC sought to create a truly military government; hence, in October 1975, the ruling council was reorganized into the Supreme Military Council (SMC), and its membership was restricted to a few senior military officers. The intent was to consolidate the military's hold over government administration and to address occasional disagreements, conflicts, and suspicions within the armed forces, which by now had emerged as the constituency of the military government. Little input from the civilian sector was allowed, and no offers were made to return any part of the government to civilian control during the SMC's first five years in power. SMC members believed that the country's problems were caused by a lack of organization, which could be remedied by applying military organization and thinking. This was the extent of the SMC philosophy. Officers were put in charge of all ministries and state enterprises; junior officers and sergeants were assigned leadership roles down to the local level in every government department and parastatal organization.

=== NRC, early years ===
During the NRC's early years, these administrative changes led multiple Ghanaians to hope that the soldiers in command would improve the efficiency of the country's bloated bureaucracies. Acheampong's popularity continued into 1974 as the government successfully negotiated international loan agreements and rescheduled Ghana's debts. The government also provided price supports for basic food imports, while seeking to encourage Ghanaians to become self- reliant in agriculture and the production of raw materials. In the Operation Feed Yourself program, all Ghanaians were encouraged to undertake some form of food production, with the goal of eventual food self-sufficiency for the country. The program enjoyed some initial success, but support for it gradually waned.

Whatever limited success the NRC had in these efforts, however, was overridden by other basic economic factors. Industry and transportation suffered greatly as world oil prices rose during and after 1974, and the lack of foreign exchange and credit left the country without fuel. Basic food production continued to decline even as the population grew, largely because of poor price management and urbanization. When world cocoa prices rose again in the late 1970s, Ghana was unable to take advantage of the price rise because of the low productivity of its old orchards. Moreover, because of the low prices paid to cocoa farmers, some growers along the nation's borders smuggled their produce to Togo or Côte d'Ivoire. Disillusionment with the government grew, particularly among the educated. Accusations of personal corruption among the rulers also began to surface.

== Supreme Military Council (1975 – 1979) ==
=== Reorganisation into SMC ===
The reorganization of the NRC into the SMC in 1975 may have been part of a face-saving attempt. Shortly after that time, the government sought to stifle opposition by issuing a decree forbidding the propagation of rumours and by banning a number of independent newspapers and detaining their journalists. Also, armed soldiers broke up student demonstrations, and the government repeatedly closed the universities, which had become important centres of opposition to NRC policies.

Despite these efforts, the SMC by 1977 found itself constrained by mounting non-violent opposition. To be sure, discussions about the nation's political future and its relationship to the SMC had begun in earnest. Although the various opposition groups (university students, lawyers, and other organized civilian groups) called for a return to civilian constitutional rule, Acheampong and the SMC favoured a union government—a mixture of elected civilian and appointed military leaders—but one in which party politics would be abolished. University students and multiple intellectuals criticized the union government idea, but others, such as Justice Gustav Koranteng-Addow, who chaired the seventeen-member ad hoc committee appointed by the government to work out details of the plan, defended it as the solution to the nation's political problems. Supporters of the union government idea viewed multi-party political contests as the perpetrators of social tension and community conflict among classes, regions, and ethnic groups. Unionists argued that their plan had the potential to depoliticize public life and to allow the nation to concentrate its energies on economic problems.

=== Referendum ===
A national referendum was held in March 1978 to allow the people to accept or reject the union government concept. A rejection of the union government meant a continuation of military rule. Given this choice, it was surprising that so narrow a margin voted in favour of union government. Opponents of the idea organized demonstrations against the government, arguing that the referendum vote had not been free or fair. The Acheampong government reacted by banning several organizations and by jailing as many as 300 of its opponents.

The agenda for change in the union government referendum called for the drafting of a new constitution by an SMC-appointed commission, the selection of a constituent assembly by November 1978, and general elections in June 1979. The ad hoc committee had recommended a non-party election, an elected executive president, and a cabinet whose members would be drawn from outside a single-house National Assembly. The military council would then step down, although its members could run for office as individuals.

=== Leadership coup ===
In July 1978, in a sudden move, the other SMC officers forced Acheampong to resign, replacing him with Lieutenant General Frederick W.K. Akuffo. The SMC apparently acted in response to continuing pressure to find a solution to the country's economic dilemma. Inflation was estimated to be as high as 300 per cent that year. There were shortages of basic commodities, and cocoa production fell to half its 1964 peak. The council was also motivated by Acheampong's failure to dampen rising political pressure for changes. Akuffo, the new SMC chairman, promised publicly to hand over political power to a new government to be elected by 1 July 1979.

Despite Akuffo's assurances, opposition to the SMC persisted. Because Akuffo implemented a number of austerity programs which intensified the food shortages and the toll on the people, the call for the formation of political parties intensified. In an effort to gain support in the face of continuing strikes over economic and political issues, the Akuffo government at length announced that the formation of political parties would be allowed after January 1979. Akuffo also granted amnesty to former members of both Nkrumah's CPP and Busia's PP, as well as to all those convicted of subversion under Acheampong. The decree lifting the ban on party politics went into effect on 1 January 1979, as planned. The constitutional assembly that had been working on a new constitution presented an approved draft and adjourned in May. All appeared set for a new attempt at constitutional government in July, when a group of young army officers overthrew the SMC government in June 1979.

== See also ==
- Political history of Ghana

== Works cited ==
- McLaughlin, James L. and David Owusu-Ansah. "Historical Setting" (and subchapters). In A Country Study: Ghana (La Verle Berry, editor). Library of Congress Federal Research Division (November 1994). This article incorporates text from this source, which is in the public domain.
