= E. A. Yeboah =

Ghanaian soldier and politician (born 1929)

Western Regional Minister
- In office 1968–1969
- Appointed by: Joseph Arthur Ankrah
- Preceded by: Lt.-Col. I. K. Acheampong
- Succeeded by: Lt.-Col. Coker-Appiah

Minister for Works and Housing
- In office April 1969 – September 1969
- Appointed by: Akwasi Afrifa
- Preceded by: Issifu Ali
- Succeeded by: Ministry split

Personal details
- Born: 8 July 1929 Nkwatia, Gold Coast
- Education: Ghana Defence College
- Occupation: Politician
- Profession: Soldier

Edmund. A. Yeboah (born 8 July 1929) was a Ghanaian soldier and politician. He served a member of the National Liberation Council from 1966 to 1969. He was the chairman of the Western Region Committee of Administration (Western Regional Minister) from 1968 to 1969, and the Commissioner for Works and Housing (Minister for Works and Housing) from April 1969 to September 1969.

== Early life and education ==
Yeboah was born on 8 July 1929, at Kwahu Nkwatia. He was educated at Nkwatia Presbyterian School where he graduated in 1947. He enrolled at the Ghana Defence College in 1965.

== Career and politics ==
Yeboah took up a teaching job at the Konongo Presbyterian School after his studies. In November 1948 he joined the Gold Coast Army, and in 1952 he became a sergeant. In 1956 he left for England to pursue a Chief Clerk course. He was later appointed Chief Clerk upon his return to the Gold Coast. In 1961, he was made Captain and sent to the United Kingdom for further studies. Upon his return, he was appointed Deputy Quartermaster General for Supplies and Transport at the Ministry of Defence. In October 1962 he promoted to a Major, and became the Director for Supplies and Transport at the Ministry of Defence. In 1964 he was appointed Commanding Officer of the first Mechanical Transport Company in Accra. A year later, he was made Commanding Officer of the fourth Mechanical Transport Company in Accra, and from 1965 to 1966, he was the Commanding Officer of the second Mechanical Transport Company in Kumasi.

In 1966 when the Nkrumah government was overthrown by the National Liberation Council, Yeboah became a member of the Eastern Region Committee of Administration. He served in this capacity until 1968 when he became the chairman of the Western Region Committee of Administration (Now Western Regional Minister). He remained in this position until 1969 when he was appointed Commissioner for Works and Housing. He remained Commissioner until September 1969 when Ghana was ushered into civilian rule.

== Personal life ==
Yeboah was married to Agnes Adormah. Together they had seven sons and two daughters. His hobbies included playing hockey, playing the guitar, and listening to music.
