= Ibrahim Mahama (politician) =

Ghanaian Civil Servant

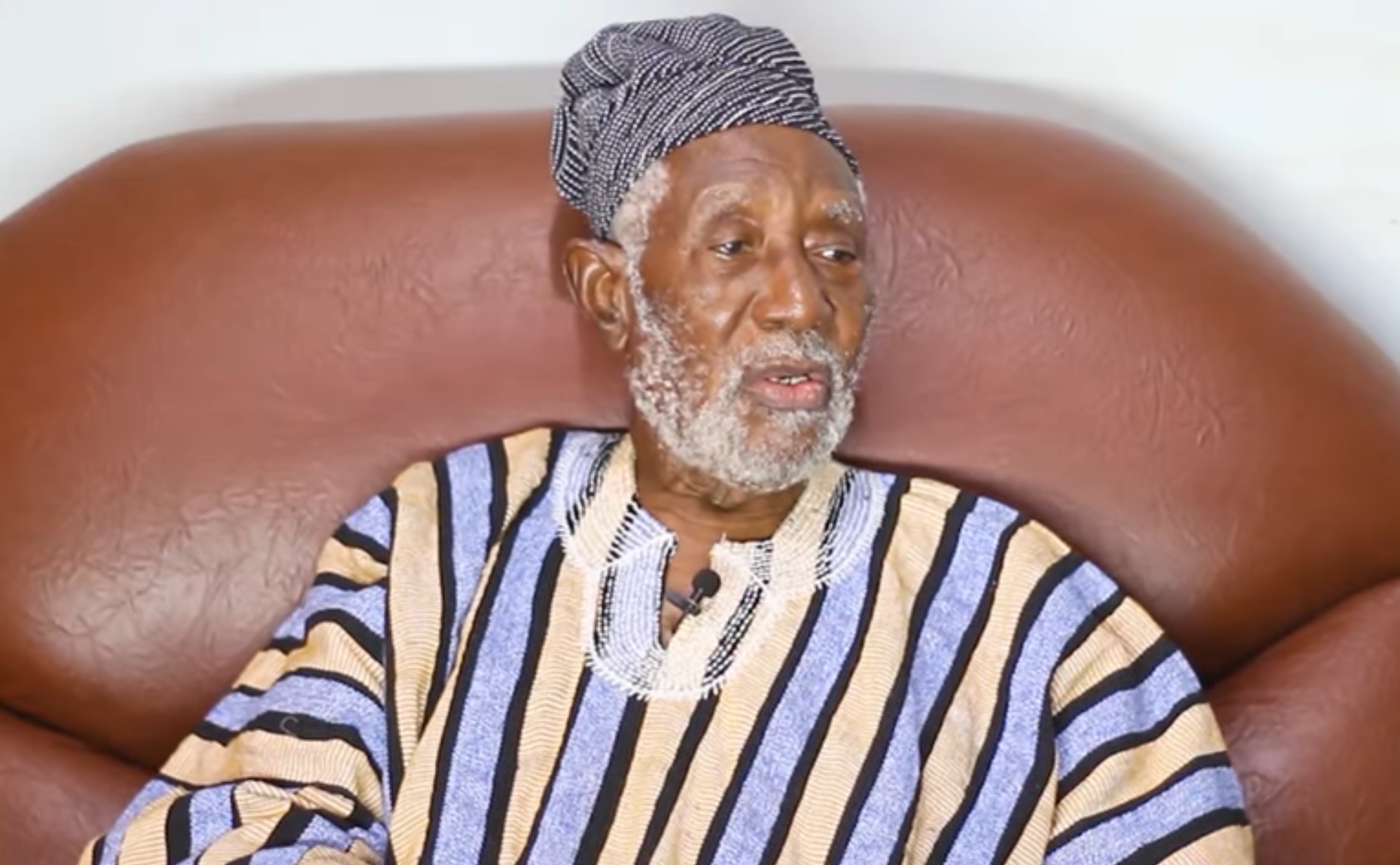

Member of the Ghana Parliament for Tamale
- In office 1 October 1969 – 13 January 1972
- Preceded by: Ebenezer Adam
- Succeeded by: Abubakar Alhassan

Commissioner for Information
- In office 1968–1969
- Appointed by: Joseph Arthur Ankrah
- Preceded by: K.G. Osei Bonsu
- Succeeded by: Issifu Ali

Personal details
- Born: 1936 (age 89–90) Gold Coast
- Education: Tamale Senior High School
- Alma mater: University of Ghana

Ibrahim Mahama is a Ghanaian lawyer, and civil servant. He was Ghana's Commissioner for Secretariats and Departments from 1967 to 1968 and Commissioner for Information from 1968 to 1969.

== Early life and education ==
Mahama is born in Tibung (a town close to Tamale) in the Northern Territories of the then Gold Coast in 1936. After staying with his parents for fifteen (15) years, he decided to go to school all by himself. He began his early education at the Savelugu Primary School from 1951 to 1953, and the Dagomba District Middle School from 1954 to 1955. A year later, he enrolled at the Government Secondary School, Tamale (now Tamale Senior High School), where he studied until 1962. That same year, he gained admission to study at the University of Ghana. There, he obtained his Bachelor of Laws degree in 1965 and his Practical Law Certificate in 1966.

== Career and politics ==
Following his studies at the University of Ghana, Mahama worked as a private legal practitioner at the Law Chambers in Accra. He was appointed Commissioner for Secretariats and Departments in 1967. He served in that capacity until 1968.

Mahama was elected during the 1969 Ghanaian parliamentary election as member of the first parliament of the second republic of Ghana on the ticket of the National Alliance of Liberals (NAL). He represented the Tamale constituency from 1 October 1969 to 13 January 1972. He was succeeded by Alhaji Abubakar Alhassan of the Social Democratic Front (SDF) in the 1979 Ghanaian general election.

== Personal life ==
Mahama's hobbies included swimming, debating, watching football, photography and current affairs.

== See also ==
- National Liberation Council
- List of MPs elected in the 1969 Ghanaian parliamentary election
