= Issifu Ali =

Ghanaian politician (1929–2019)

Minister for Works and Housing
- In office 1966 – April 1969
- Appointed by: Joseph Arthur Ankrah
- Preceded by: Ibrahim Mahama
- Succeeded by: E. A. Yeboah

Minister for Information
- In office 1969 – August 1969
- Preceded by: Ibrahim Mahama
- Succeeded by: T. D. Brodie-Mends

Personal details
- Born: 21 May 1929 Wa, Gold Coast
- Died: 9 April 2019 Accra
- Party: National Democratic Congress
- Children: 5
- Education: University of St Andrews, Scotland
- Occupation: Chartered accountant, chartered secretary, politician, public servant, businessman and entrepreneur
- Profession: Chartered accountant and chartered secretary

Alhaji Issifu Ali (born 21 May 1929 – 9 April 2019) was a Ghanaian politician and former co-chairman of the National Democratic Congress. He served as Commissioner for Works and Housing from 1966 to April 1969 and Commissioner for Information in 1969.

== Early life and education ==
Ali is an indigene of Wa in the Upper West region of Ghana hailing from Jeyiri in the Wa East and growing up in Guonbili muni . He was born on 21 May 1929 at Enchi in the Western region of Ghana. He had his early education from 1937 to 1941 at Wa. He studied at the Tamale Teacher training college for four years. And he furthered his education at St. Andrews University in Scotland where he graduated with a master's degree in Political Economy and Modern History from 1955 to 1958. He took a further course in Accounting and was conferred with Associate Chartered Accountant (A.C.A) England and Wales and Associate of the Chartered Institute of Secretaries (A.C.I.S.).

== Career ==
Ali returned from the United Kingdom to Ghana and worked at the Casselton and Elliot group of Company which was a group of Chartered Accountants in Accra. Later, he resigned after two years, to take on the post of Chief Accountant at the Agricultural Credit and Co-operative Bank now Agricultural Development Bank, from September 1965 until his appointment as commissioner.

Among the several roles Mr. Ali served were board member of the Trustees for the Center for Civic Education now the National Commission for Civic Education, served on the Executive council for the Society for the Blind Ghana and also Board Chairman of Ghana Airports Company. In 1967, he established the firm, Issifu Ali & Co where he practiced professionally till his passing, impacting the financial space of Ghana. Today, Issifu Ali & Co is one of the leading indigenous accounting and auditing firms of high standards, in Ghana.

== Politics ==
In 1966, Ali was appointed commissioner for Works and Housing. He was also appointed commissioner for information now Ministry of Information in 1968. On 1 August 1969, he quit his position as Commissioner of Information to engage in Politics. He stated, he together with his colleagues of the National Liberation Council decided not to be executive members of the council while they still held on to their posts as commissioners of state. Mr Ali was more of a technocrat than a politician. In 1973, continuous worker agitations over inequitable remuneration culminated in the formation of a committee by the Supreme Military Council (SMC). This committee, which came to be known as the Issifu Ali Committee, was established as a formal response to the widespread demands for fair and just treatment in the workplace and was led by Issifu Ali.

His first assignment with the National Democratic Congress was its formation and registration. In a power balancing situation, he was later to serve as one of the first co-chairmen of the National Democratic Congress. He served together with A. A. Munufie from 1990 to 2000 winning two consecutive elections.

In 2012, Alhaji Issifu Ali served as chairman of the Presidential elections committee of the National Democratic Congress vetting the sitting President John Evans Atta Mills who was canvassing for a second term and his key competitor Nana Konadu Agyeman Rawlings, the then 2nd Vice Chairman and wife of the then former President Jerry John Rawlings. During the Ghana National Awards on the ocaction of Ghana's 51st anniversary, Alhaji Issifu ali was awarded with the national award.

== Personal life ==
Ali's interests includes; reading, debating and swimming. He enjoyed playing tennis as well, he was married with five children. Three males and two females. Mr. Ali was an Ahmadi muslim and worshiped regularly with the Ahmadiyya Muslim Mission at Nyaniba, Osu in Accra .

== Death ==
Ali was a member of the council of elders of the National Democratic Congress before his death. He died on 9 April 2019 at the Greater Accra Regional Hospital after a short illness. He was buried at the Kasoa Ahmadiyya Muslim cemetery. He was survived by three children, thirteen grandchildren and twenty-seven great grandchildren.

Former President of Ghana, Jerry John Rawlings the founder of the National Democratic Congress, paid tribute to Ali who is a former Chairman of the Party. Jerry John Rawlings said "People like him (Issifu Ali) will have a red-carpet treatment in heaven. Ali was a man of integrity. Let’s not allow people of integrity and moral authority to fade out."

== See also ==
- National Liberation Council.
