= Mildred Christina Akosiwor Fugar =

Former First Lady of Ghana and wife to Joseph Arthur Ankrah

- Born: June 12, 1938; Luluabourg, Belgian Congo
- Died: June 9, 2005 (aged 66)
- Other names: Mildred Ankrah
- Known for: First Lady of Ghana
- Spouse: Joseph Arthur Ankrah

Mildred Christina Akosiwor Fugar also known as Mildred Ankrah (12 June 1938 – 9 June 2005) was a First Lady of Ghana and wife to Joseph Arthur Ankrah. She was brought up in the Belgian Congo and Gold Coast. After her husband's rise to power in the 1966 coup, she became involved in social and religious work.

== Biography ==
Fugar was born on 12 June 1938 in Luluabourg, Belgian Congo (now Kananga, Democratic Republic of the Congo); to Benoni Kwaku Fugar, a Ghanaian, and Pauline Isombe Edembe Fugar, a Congolese citizen. She was the fourth of seven children. Fugar started her education at the Keta Roman Catholic Convent in Gold Coast (now Ghana), where she also completed middle school in 1957. She then continued on to the Universal Commercial College (UCC), Somanya. Mildred began to work at the Ghanaian Central Revenue Department, now the Ghana Internal Revenue Service, after successful completion of her course at UCC.

She met General Joseph Arthur Ankrah for the first time in 1962 after her sister Florence went to Burma Camp to join the auxiliary corps of the Ghanaian Army. Florence saw two high ranking army officials and asked them to direct her to the "boss of the army" so that she could submit her application. Ankrah was so taken by her that he escorted her back home to her family, where he met Mildred. They were engaged in 1965 and later married.

Following the coup d'état which led to a change of government on 24 February 1966, and the rise of Ankrah to head of state of Ghana and chairman of the National Liberation Council, Fugar became First Lady. She engaged heavily in social and religious work.

== Death ==
Mildred died on 9 June 2005. She was buried that same year on June 29 at the Osu Cemetery in Accra.
