= A. O. Mills =

Ghanaian civil servant

Adjebu-Kojo Osah Mills

Principal Secretary of the Ministry of Defence
- In office 1967–1970

Establishment Secretary of Ghana
- In office 1961–1967
- Appointed by: Kwame Nkrumah
- Preceded by: David Anderson
- Succeeded by: Joe D. Laryea

Personal details
- Born: Accra, Gold Coast
- Education: Accra Academy
- Occupation: civil servant

Adjebu-Kojo Osah Mills was a Ghanaian civil servant. He was Principal Secretary to the Establishment Secretariat of Ghana from October 1961 to November 1967. He succeeded the British civil servant David Anderson. He was the only Ghanaian to be head of the Establishment Secretariat during the Kwame Nkrumah Republican era and the second Ghanaian officeholder after Robert K. A. Gardiner, who served in dual capacity as Establishment Secretary and Head of the Civil Service.

== Early life and education ==
Osah Mills was born in August 1918 in Accra. He had his early education at the Accra Royal School from 1925 to 1934, and proceeded to the Accra Academy for his secondary education from 1935 to 1938.

== Career ==
Osah Mills begun his career as a clerk in 1935. In June 1939 Osah-Mills joined the colonial civil service as a second division clerk within the registry of the Department of Education. In December 1949 he was promoted to senior executive officer. In November 1954, he became an administrative officer in the Ministry of Housing and later transferred to the Ministry of Works.

By 1960, he moved to the Establishment Secretariat. He became the acting director of recruitment (overseas) from January 1961 to May 1961. Osah Mills was appointed Principal Secretary for the Establishment Secretariat on 1 October 1961. He reported to the president's office and coordinated matters of personnel policy and control. The role of Establishment Secretary used to be coupled with that of Head of the Civil Service until 1959 when Prime Minister Kwame Nkrumah decoupled both roles. Nkrumah added the role of Head of the Civil Service to that of the Secretary of the Cabinet, which begun a long precedence in Ghana. However, the day-to-day administration of the civil service remained with the Establishment Secretariat. Osah-Mills served in this capacity until November 1967.

In December 1967, however, he was sent to the Office of the National Liberation Council as second in succession to the cabinet secretary, Lawrence Apaloo and his deputy, E.C. Quist-Therson. In 1968, he was reassigned as Principal Secretary to the Ministry of Defense with the military head of government, Joseph Ankrah retaining ministerial oversight as Commissioner for Defence.

He lost his post in the administrative service in 1970 in the second Ghanaian republic. This was due to a mass dismissal action taken and argued by the Busia government as being supported by the 1969 constitutional provisions in which he and the most senior officials of state-owned media organisations which include editor of the Daily Graphic, Nicholas Alando, general manager of the Ghana Broadcasting Corporation, Matthias Ofori and the director-general of the Ghana Broadcasting Corporation, William Frank Coleman were cited by West Africa (magazine) to be the most notable affected public officers.

== Personal life ==
Osah Mills' hobbies included reading. Through a marriage, that lasted sixty-two years, he had eight children.
