= 1966 Ghanaian coup d'état =

Military overthrow of Kwame Nkrumah

1966 Ghanaian coup d'etat
- Part of the Cold War
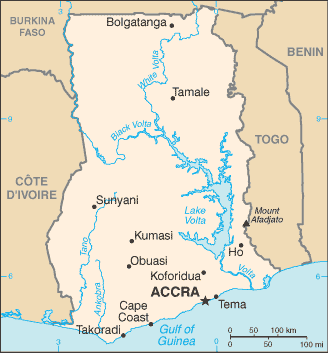
- Map of Ghana.
Date	24 February 1966
Location	Accra, Ghana
Result	Nkrumah government toppled

Belligerents
Government of Ghana	National Liberation Council

Commanders and leaders
Kwame Nkrumah	Joseph Ankrah

The 1966 Ghanaian coup d'état (codenamed Operation Cold Chop) was a military overthrow of President Kwame Nkrumah on February 24, 1966, while he was visiting China. The swift coup led to the establishment of an eight-member National Liberation Council (NLC), comprising four army and four police officers. The NLC dissolved Nkrumah's Convention People's Party and the Parliament, and suspended the constitution.

== Political climate ==
From 1951 to 1966, Ghana was controlled by the Convention People's Party and its founder Kwame Nkrumah. During the 1950s, the CPP sponsored a variety of popular economic projects and in the process created a large foreign debt. In 1960, the CPP moved to nationalize the Ghanaian economy and heavily tightened its control in areas such as currency and taxation. By 1963, the public was suffering from shortages and price gouging. Fewer and fewer businesspeople benefited from party membership. Amidst growing unpopularity, the Party increased its repression of political opponents. It used the Preventive Detention Act to jail its opponents without trial for up to five years. In 1964, Nkrumah won a heavily rigged referendum that made the CPP the sole legal party, with himself as president for life of both nation and party. Press freedom reached a low ebb, as evidenced in an October 1965 statement by the Ghanaian Times: "Our socialist society cannot, and would not, tolerate the publication of any newspaper in Ghana which departs from the ideology and loyalties demanded from the press in socialist and Nkrumaist Ghana." General Afrifa later commented, regarding Radio Ghana: "From early morning till late at night there poured forth a sickening stream of Stalinist adulation and abject flattery. News was so often distorted or suppressed that Ghanaians stopped believing what they heard."

The Party acted as a political monolith, with functional control over powerful civil organizations such as the Ghana Trades Union Congress and Ghana Muslim Council. Thus, the CPP had centralized political and economic power in order to pursue rapid industrialization under national control.

Behind the scenes was an elite group of economic planners which stood to advance its agenda under military rule. These technocrats within the government found common cause with the military and police in their disdain for the mass politics of the Convention People's Party. One such figure was B. A. Bentum, former Secretary-General of the Agricultural Workers Union and subsequently the Minister of Forestry under the CPP. Bentum disapproved of the country's socialist tendencies and collaborated with the plotters by supplying them with information (including details about secret Chinese training camps, being used to train revolutionaries from other African countries). Kojo Botsio, chairman of the State Planning Commission, was similarly disposed if not as closely involved.

== Military and police dissatisfaction ==
Nkrumah faulted the police for allowing an attempted bombing against him in 1962. When on 2 January 1964, a police officer shot at Nkrumah and killed his bodyguard, the Police Force was reorganized from above, eight top officers were dismissed, and the rank and file were disarmed. Subsequently, in April 1965, the Police Service Act gave Nkrumah direct authority to hire and fire police. Nkrumah also removed the "Special Branch" intelligence service from the police force and brought it under civilian control.

Police Commissioner John Harlley and his second-in-command Anthony Deku had long aspired to take control of the government. Harlley had compiled a large dossier on corruption within the CPP and used these files to gain legitimacy for his cause. To take over the country, however, the Police Force had to work with the military—not only because they had been disarmed, but also because, as the primary executors of repression and brutality under the CPP, they did not enjoy a good reputation with the general public.

Coup planners from the military identified mistreatment of the armed forces, and preferential treatment of the President's Own Guard Regiment, as sources of their dissatisfaction. The salaries of soldiers and officers, set in 1957, had lost much of their value amidst general inflation, and the army did not have money for new uniforms and equipment.

Some key figures of the coup had come into personal conflict with Nkrumah. Otu, the Chief of Defense Staff, and Ankrah, the Deputy Chief, had been fired in August 1965 and replaced with officers considered more loyal. The generals later claimed that actions such as these represented an overreach of civilian power over the military. Afrifa was facing a court-martial for insubordination, to begin on 25 February 1966. Harlley and Deku were accused of involvement in a newly exposed scheme to illicitly sell diamonds to a European dealer—according to rumour, Nkrumah would have arrested them upon return to the country.

Ethnic loyalties may also have influenced some of the coup planners. A significant number came from the Ewe group, which had been divided by the border with Togo and felt it had received unfair treatment under Nkrumah and the CPP. The Ewe officers, who formed the inner circle of the coup, all grew up in the same area, and Harlley and Emmanuel Kotoka (the most prominent members from each of the forces) both attended Anloga Presbyterian School.

The coup planners had all received training in Britain, either at Metropolitan Police College or at Royal Military Academy Sandhurst, and were widely perceived as "pro-Western". In general, the Ghanaian officer corps was deeply Anglophilic and saw British culture as an indicator of status. Thus, they already objected to Nkrumah's dismissal of British officers in 1961. Nor were they pleased about an ongoing realignment away from Britain to the Union of Soviet Socialist Republics for officer training. Air Marshal Otu would write in June 1968 that Ghana "had become a single party totalitarian dictatorship; it had also abregated personal liberties; it had thrown to the winds [the] sacred principle of the rule of law, reduced elections to a farce and much worse, spurned all its traditional ties with the West in favour of dubious advantages of association with strange friends from the east."

== Accusations of Anglo-American involvement ==
Some of the first allegations about United States involvement in the coup came from retired CIA officer John Stockwell in his 1978 book, In Search of Enemies.

In a footnote comment comparing the coup in Ghana to more recent operations in the Congo, Stockwell wrote:

This is the way the ouster of Nkrumah was handled in Ghana, 1966. The 40 Committee had met and rejected an agency proposal to oust Nkrumah. The Accra station was nevertheless encouraged by headquarters to maintain contact with dissidents of the Ghanaian army for the purpose of gathering intelligence on their activities. It was given a generous budget, and maintained intimate contact with the plotters as a coup was hatched. So close was the station's involvement that it was able to coordinate the recovery of some classified Soviet military equipment by the United States as the coup took place. The station even proposed to headquarters through back channels that a squad be on hand at the moment of the coup to storm the Chinese embassy, kill everyone inside, steal their secret records, and blow up the building to cover the fact. This proposal was quashed, but inside CIA headquarters the Accra station was given full, if unofficial credit for the eventual coup, in which eight Soviet advisors were killed. None of this was adequately reflected in the agency's written records.

Historian John Prados has written that it has not been verified that the CIA had any role in directing the coup, though they were aware of the tensions which were rising between the Ghana military and the Nkrumah government. CIA operative Howard Bane even claimed in February 1966 that a string of coups which had occurred in other African nations were also motivating the Ghana military to topple Nkrumah.

Memoranda released in 2001 suggest that the United States and United Kingdom discussed a plan "to induce a chain reaction eventually leading to Nkrumah's downfall." Relevant files from the British intelligence service, MI6, remain (as of 2009) classified.

Britain and the United States began discussions of regime change in Ghana in 1961. Details of plans from this time are mostly unknown, since declassified documents from this period remain censored. One such plot involved Finance Minister K.A. Gbedemah, who secured CIA and State Department support for a plan to overthrow Nkrumah—but was detected by the national intelligence service.

Central Intelligence Agency interest in Ghana increased again in 1964, when Director of Central Intelligence John A. McCone began participating in high-level meetings to discuss future relations with the country. On 6 February 1964, U.S. Secretary of State Dean Rusk asked McCone to study the possibility of a government takeover led by J.A. Ankrah. McCone indicated on February 11 that such a policy might be pursued in cooperation with the British. On 26 February 1964, Nkrumah wrote to U.S. President Lyndon Johnson criticizing "two conflicting establishments" operating in Ghana.

There is the United States Embassy as a diplomatic institution doing formal diplomatic business with us; there is also the C.I.A. organisation which functions presumably within or outside this recognised body. This latter organisation, that is, the C.I.A., seems to devote all its attention to fomenting ill-will, misunderstanding and even clandestine and subversive activities among our people, to the impairment of the good relations which exist between our two Governments.

— Kwame Nkrumah, Letter to President Johnson, 26 February 1964

When in early 1965 Nkrumah requested financial assistance from the United States, the State Department turned him down and suggested he ask the IMF. Nevertheless, U.S. President Lyndon Johnson did agree to lend him financial aid for the Volta river projects. The U.S. was reluctant to negotiate with Nkrumah partly because they foresaw a coup d'état led by Otu, Ankrah, and Harlley. In April, the U.S. Embassy in Accra submitted a report to the State Department titled "Proposed United States Aid Posture toward a Successor Government to Nkrumah's."

A U.S. National Security Council memo from Robert Komer to McGeorge Bundy appraised the situation:

McGB—

FYI, we may have a pro-Western coup in Ghana soon. Certain key military and police figures have been planning one for some time, and Ghana’s deteriorating economic condition may provide the spark.

The plotters are keeping us briefed, and State thinks we’re more on the inside than the British. While we’re not directly involved (I’m told), we and other Western countries (including France) have been helping to set up the situation by ignoring Nkrumah’s pleas for economic aid. The new OCAM (Francophone) group’s refusal to attend any OAU meeting in Accra (because of Nkrumah’s plotting) will further isolate him. All in all, looks good.

RWK

— Robert W. Komer, Memorandum to McGeorge Bundy, 27 May 1965

Nkrumah himself feared for his life and felt great distress during this time. Diplomatic relations with the West seemed to deteriorate, with Nkrumah's publication of Neo-Colonialism: The Last Stage of Imperialism and his criticism of Britain's response to the secession of White Rhodesia. Nkrumah also resisted economic policies proposed in May 1965 by the International Monetary Fund and reasserted by the World Bank in September 1965.

== Action ==
Nkrumah left the country on February 21, 1966, for a diplomatic meeting with Ho Chi Minh. He traveled first to China. The United States encouraged him to go on this diplomatic mission and indeed promised to halt the bombing of North Vietnam in order to ensure his safety.

A group of 600 soldiers stationed in the northern part of the country was ordered to start moving south to Accra, a distance of 435 miles (700 km). They were told at first that they were mobilizing to respond to the situation in Rhodesia. The coup leaders told the soldiers, when they reached Accra, that Nkrumah was meeting with Ho Chi Minh in preparation for a deployment of Ghanaian soldiers to the Vietnam War. Furthermore, the soldiers were told, they were going to be deployed in Rhodesia to fight against the White government of Ian Smith.

The soldiers were divided up and led to capture various key government buildings. With the Chief of Defense Staff being at an OAU meeting, the ranking officer was General Charles Barwah, reportedly shot to death when he refused to cooperate with the coup. The State Broadcasting House and international communications buildings were captured quickly. The heaviest fighting broke out at The Flagstaff House, the presidential residence, where the military overthrowers met resistance from the Presidential Guard.

The coup leaders informed the public of the regime change over the radio at dawn on February 24, 1966. Colonel Kokota's statement over the radio was as follows:

Fellow citizens of Ghana, I have come to inform you that the military, in cooperation with the Ghana Police, have taken over the government of Ghana today. The myth surrounding Nkrumah has been broken. Parliament is dissolved and Kwame Nkrumah is dismissed from office. All ministers are also dismissed. The Convention People's Party is disbanded with effect from now. It will be illegal for any person to belong to it.

The soldiers proceeded to arrest CPP ministers as fighting with the Presidential Guard continued. When Colonel Kokota threatened to bomb the presidential residence if resistance continued after 12 pm, Nkrumah's wife Fathia Nkrumah advised the Guards to surrender and they did.

A CIA telegram informed Washington of the coup, and said, "The coup leaders appear to be implementing the plans they were reported earlier to have agreed on for the immediate post-coup period." According to the military, 20 members of the presidential guard had been killed and 25 wounded. Others suggest a death toll of 1,600. According to Nkrumah biographer June Milne, "whatever the death toll, it was far from the 'bloodless coup' reported in the British press."
