= Albert Kwesi Ocran =

Ghanaian politician and soldier (1929–2019)

Member of Presidential Commission
- In office 3 September 1969 – 7 August 1970
- President: Lt. Gen. Akwasi Afrifa
- Prime Minister: Kofi Abrefa Busia

Member of NLC
- In office 24 February 1966 – 1 October 1969
- President: Lt. Gen. J. A. Ankrah; Lt. Gen. Akwasi Afrifa

Personal details
- Born: 21 July 1929 Brakwa, Central Region, Gold Coast (now Ghana)
- Died: March 2019 (aged 89)
- Profession: Soldier
- Cabinet: National Liberation Council member

Military service
- Allegiance: Ghana
- Branch/service: Ghana Army
- Rank: Lieutenant General
- Commands: Chief of the Defence Staff
- President: Veterans Association of Ghana

Lieutenant General Albert Kwesi Ocran (21 July 1929 – March 2019) was a soldier and politician. He was a member of the Presidential Commission of Ghana between 1969 and 1970. He is a former Chief of the Defence Staff of the Ghana Armed Forces and was a member of the National Liberation Council (NLC) military government in Ghana.

== Career ==
Ocran was commissioned as an officer in the Gold Coast Regiment of the United Kingdom's Royal West African Frontier Force in 1954. He later rose to become a Colonel in the Ghana army after independence. He was the commander of the First Infantry Brigade of the army now known as the Southern Command at the time of the coup d'état of 1966. He was promoted to Brigadier following the coup and made Chief of Army Staff, a position he held for six months. He was reappointed Chief of Army Staff in May 1967. He was promoted to the position of Chief of the Defence Staff in November 1968 and continued as such until November 1969.

== Politics ==
The then Colonel Ocran came into national prominence with his involvement in the first coup d'état in Ghana. This led to the overthrow of the Convention People's Party (CPP) government of Dr. Kwame Nkrumah on 24 February 1966. After the coup, he was one of the eight members of the National Liberation Council (NLC), which replaced the Nkrumah government.

He was promoted to Brigadier as well as becoming a member of the new NLC military government. After the parliamentary election of 1969, Ocran became one of three members of an interim Presidential Commission which ushered in the second republic. The other members were John Willie Kofi Harlley, the Inspector General of Police of the Ghana Police Service and Lt. Gen. Akwasi Afrifa who was the chairman. He remained on the commission till it was dissolved in August 1970. The commission was replaced by an interim ceremonial president, Nii Amaa Ollennu.

== Life after politics ==
Ocran became the president of the Veterans Association of Ghana. He is also one of the people honoured by president John Kufuor in 2006.

== Publications ==
- Ocran, Albert Kwesi (1968). A Myth Is Broken: An Account of the Ghana Coup d'Etat of 24th February 1966. New York: Humanities Press.
- Ocran, Albert Kwesi (1977). Dennis Austin and Robin Luckham (ed.). Politics of the Sword: A Personal Memoir on Military Involvement in Ghana and of Problems of Military Government. London: Rex Collings.

Military offices
Preceded by Major General C. M. Barwah	Chief of Army Staff; 1966	Succeeded by Major General C. C. Bruce
Preceded by Major General C. C. Bruce	Chief of Army Staff; 1967 – 1968	Succeeded by Brigadier D. C. K. Amenu
Preceded by Air Marshal Michael Akuoko Otu	Chief of the Defence Staff; 1968 – 1969	Succeeded by Air Marshal Michael Akuoko Otu
