= R. S. Amegashie =

Public servant

Raphael Sylvanus Amegashie

Minister for Trade and Industries
- In office 1966–1968
- Appointed by: Joseph Arthur Ankrah
- Preceded by: Imoru Egala
- Succeeded by: J. V. L. Phillips (Minister for Industries and Ghana Industrial Holdings)

Minister for Lands and Mineral Resources
- In office 1968–1969
- Appointed by: Joseph Arthur Ankrah
- Preceded by: J. V. L. Phillips
- Succeeded by: R. R. Amponsah (Minister for Lands, Mineral Resources, Forestry and Wildlife)

Personal details
- Born: October 24, 1927 Keta, Gold Coast
- Died: November 2013
- Children: 5
- Education: Achimota School
- Alma mater: University of Durham
- Profession: Accountant

Raphael Sylvanus Amegashie (24 October 1927 – November 2013) was a Ghanaian entrepreneur, accountant and politician. He served as commissioner for Industries and state enterprises secretariat, as well as commissioner for lands and natural resources now Ministry of lands and Natural resources. He was a member of the National Liberation Council which came to power in a military coup d'état on 24 February 1966. Also he served as one of the board chairmen of the State Insurance Company (SIC) during its inception.

== Early life and education ==
Raphael Sylvanus Amegashie was born at Keta in the Volta Region of Ghana on 24 October 1927. He went to Achimota School and the University of Newcastle in England.

== Career and politics ==
Amegashie is an Accountant. He served on numerous boards and institutions. He worked as an accountant for the Gold Coast machinery and trading company limited. From 1955 to 1959, he was a senior lecturer at the Kumasi college of technology now Kwame Nkrumah University of Science and Technology, he taught accounting and allied subjects, later he became the principal of the college of Administration from 1960 to 1962. Amegashie served as chairman for the Capital investment board and the negotiating committee of the State enterprises secretariat. Also, he was once director of the former School of Administration now University of Ghana Business School of the University of Ghana and president of the Institute of Chartered Accountants, Ghana. He is also regarded as one of the founders of the Institute of Chartered Accountants, Ghana.

After the coup in February 1966, Amegashie was a member of the economic committee of the ruling National Liberation Council.

== Personal life ==
He was married with three children.

== Literature ==
Amegashie's main publications includes:

1. "The contract function in Management"
2. "The Management Process"
3. "In Defense of Business Enterprise"
4. "Africa's Socialist Development"
5. "Reflection of Productivity Drive in Ghana"

== Death and legacy ==
Amegashie died at a Johannesburg Hospital in South Africa in November 2013. He died at the age of 86. For his role in the establishment of the school, a hall known as the R. S. Amegashie auditorium at the University of Ghana Business School has been named after him.
