= J. V. L. Phillips =

Ghanaian Civil Servant

James Villers Legge Phillips

Minister for Industries and Ghana Industrial Holdings
- In office 1968–1969
- Appointed by: Joseph Arthur Ankrah
- Preceded by: R. S. Amegashie (Minister for Industries and State Enterprises)
- Succeeded by: Richard Abusua-Yedom Quarshie (Minister for Trade, Industry and Tourism)

Minister for Lands and Mineral Resources
- In office 1966–1968
- Appointed by: Joseph Arthur Ankrah
- Preceded by: Kobina Orleans Thompson (Minister for Mines and Mineral Resources)
- Succeeded by: R. S. Amagashie

Personal details
- Born: James Villers Legge Phillips; February 23, 1922 Cape Coast, Gold Coast
- Died: 2012 (aged 89–90) Accra, Ghana
- Relations: Harold H. Phillips
- Education: Mfantsipim School
- Alma mater: Emmanuel College, Cambridge
- Occupation: Civil Servant

James Villers Legge Phillips (February 23, 1922–2012) was a Ghanaian civil servant and politician. He was Ghana's Commissioner (Minister) for Lands and Mineral Resources from 1966 to 1968, and Ghana's Commissioner (Minister) for Industries and Ghana Industrial Holdings from 1968 to 1969.

== Early life and education ==
A descendant of Dutch-Fante people, Phillips was born on 23 February 1922 at Cape Coast, Ghana (then Gold Coast). He had his secondary school education at Mfantsipim School and his tertiary education at Emmanuel College, Cambridge where he graduated with a bachelor's degree in 1946.

== Career and politics ==
Phillips returned to Ghana in October 1946 and was appointed Labour Officer. He became Deputy Commissioner of Labour in 1955, and in 1958, he was appointed Commissioner of Labour. He joined the Ministry of Finance in 1959 working as Secretary to the Budget Bureau, and later, Principal Secretary to the ministry. Prior to his appointment as executive secretary of the State Enterprises Secretariat (a secretariat which had been created to advise and direct the operations of all State corporations), he was the executive secretary of the State Control Commission; a sub-committee of Cabinet which was responsible for economic and financial matters. In October 1966, Phillips voluntarily retired from Civil Service. Following the 1966 coup d'état, he served as Director of Parkinson Howard (Ghana) for a brief period of time. He served as Ghana's Commissioner (Minister) for Lands and Mineral Resources from 1966 to 1968, and Ghana's Commissioner (Minister) for Industries and Ghana Industrial Holdings from 1968 to 1969. During the Supreme Military Council regime, he served as the resident Manager, and chairman for the Volta Aluminium Company (VALCO).

== Golf ==
Phillips was a founding member of the Ghana Golf Association (GGA). He was then a member of the biggest golf club in Ghana, the Achimota Golf Club. Other founding members included Kwesi Chinbuah, Acquaah Harrison and David Anderson. He served as the president of the GGA between 1980 and 1990.

== Adult Education ==
Phillips, while he was Senior Labour Officer in charge of the Tarkwa district became involved as a part-time lecturer for extra-mural courses organised by the then Institute of Extra-Mural Studies (later Institute of Adult Education and now the School of Continuing and Distance Education) of the University College of the Gold Coast (now the University of Ghana.

== Personal life ==
Phillips was a member of the District Grand Lodge of Ghana. He once served as its Right Worshipful Grand Master. He was also a founding member of the Methodist University College, Ghana. He was married to Rachael Phillips with 4 children.

== Recognition ==
The family of Phillips donated money for the creation of JVL Phillips Chair of Mathematics in his memory as a former District Grand Master of Ghana for Freemasonry.

== Death ==
James Phillips died in 2012, aged 90 years. His funeral service was held at the Accra Ridge Church.
