= Bawa Andani Yakubu =

Ghanaian politician

Gushie-Naa Bawa Andani Yakubu, MV

Gushie-Naa
- In office February 1971 – January 2002
- Preceded by: Sugri Issah
- Succeeded by: Yakubu Bukari

National Liberation Council Member
- In office 24 February 1966 – 29 August 1969
- President: Lt Gen J. A. Ankrah

Inspector General of Police
- In office 13 September 1969 – 12 June 1971
- President: Lt Gen. J. A. Ankrah
- Preceded by: J. W. K. Harlley
- Succeeded by: R. D. Ampaw

Personal details
- Born: 1926 Gushegu District, Gold Coast (British colony) (now Ghana)
- Died: 6 January 2002 (aged 75–76) Gushegu, Ghana
- Resting place: Gushegu, Ghana
- Profession: Police officer

Bawa Andani Yakubu, MV (1926–2002) was a police officer, politician and king. He was an Inspector General of Police in Ghana. He also served in the National Liberation Council (NLC) government. He was the Gushie-Naa or Gushie King until his death.

== Career ==
He was appointed Commissioner of Police (Administration) and later Inspector General of Police from 3 September 1969 to 12 June 1971. He retired from the Police service after becoming the Gushie Na.

== Politics ==
While still a Deputy Commissioner in the Ghana Police Force, Yakubu was appointed a member of the NLC military government from 24 February 1966 to 29 August 1969. He was one of four police officers on the NLC. The others were J. W. K. Harlley, the Vice Chairman, Anthony K. Deku, Commissioner of Police (CID) and J. E. O. Nunoo, Commissioner of Police (Administration).

== King of Gushegu ==
Bawa Yakubu was the son of a former Gushe-Naa Yakubu (Gushegu King). Gushegu is located in the Northern Region of Ghana. His brother Sugri Issah succeeded their father as Gushie-Naa after his death. Following the death of Issah, Yakubu was enskinned Gushie-Naa in February 1971 by the Abdulai Mahama IV, Paramount Chief after using his power as the IGP of Ghana during 1969 to support fire Ya Naa Ya Naa Yakubu Andani II when he was just a regent. A committee then enskinned Naa Abdulai Mahama IV who was later diskinned by the same committee that appointed him. Yakubu had to seek for the kingship of Gushegu from the same Ya Naa Yakubu II whom he had helped his brothers from the Abudu gate fired out of the Gwewaa palace in 1969 paving the way for Mahama IV. When all those Mahama appointed as chiefs during his reign as Ya Naa was announced null and void. He was made the king of Gushegu Dagomba Traditional Area Ya Naa Yakubu Andani and served as the Gushie-Naa until his death in January 2002 just two months before the gruesome murder of Ya Naa Yakubu Andani II.

== Honours ==
He was awarded a Member of the Order of the Volta in 1969.

Police appointments
Preceded by J. W. K. Harlley	Inspector General of Police; 1969 – 71	Succeeded by R. D. Ampaw
Regnal titles
Preceded by Sugri Issah	Gushie-Naa; February 1971 – January 2002	Succeeded by Yakubu Bukari
