= Anyako =

Town in Volta Region, Ghana

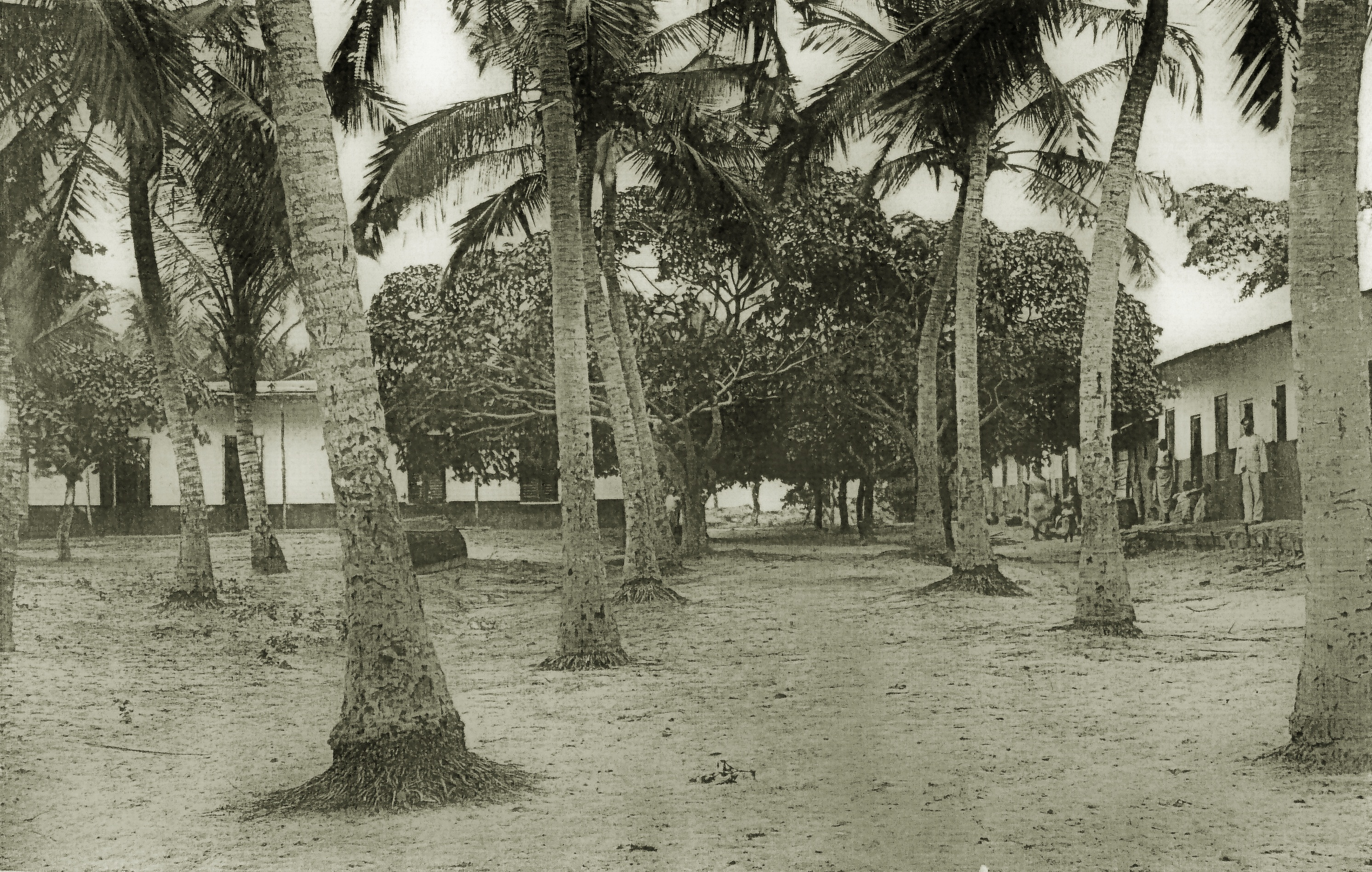
- The Mission Station Anyako (Volta Region, Ghana)
- Nickname: Little London
- Location in Ghana
- Coordinates: 05°59′38.26″N 0°55′3.81″E
- Country: Ghana
- Region: Volta Region

Anyako is a town in the Volta Region of Ghana. It is bordered at the south by the Keta Lagoon. The inhabitants of the town mainly belong to the Ewe ethnic group. Tracing its establishment to a settlement founded by the Anlos during the migration from Notsie in present-day Togo. The town is the birthplace of Ghanaian-American artist El Anatsui. The town has had little to no growth over the past thirty years due to sea erosion which affected commercial activities.

== Suburbs ==
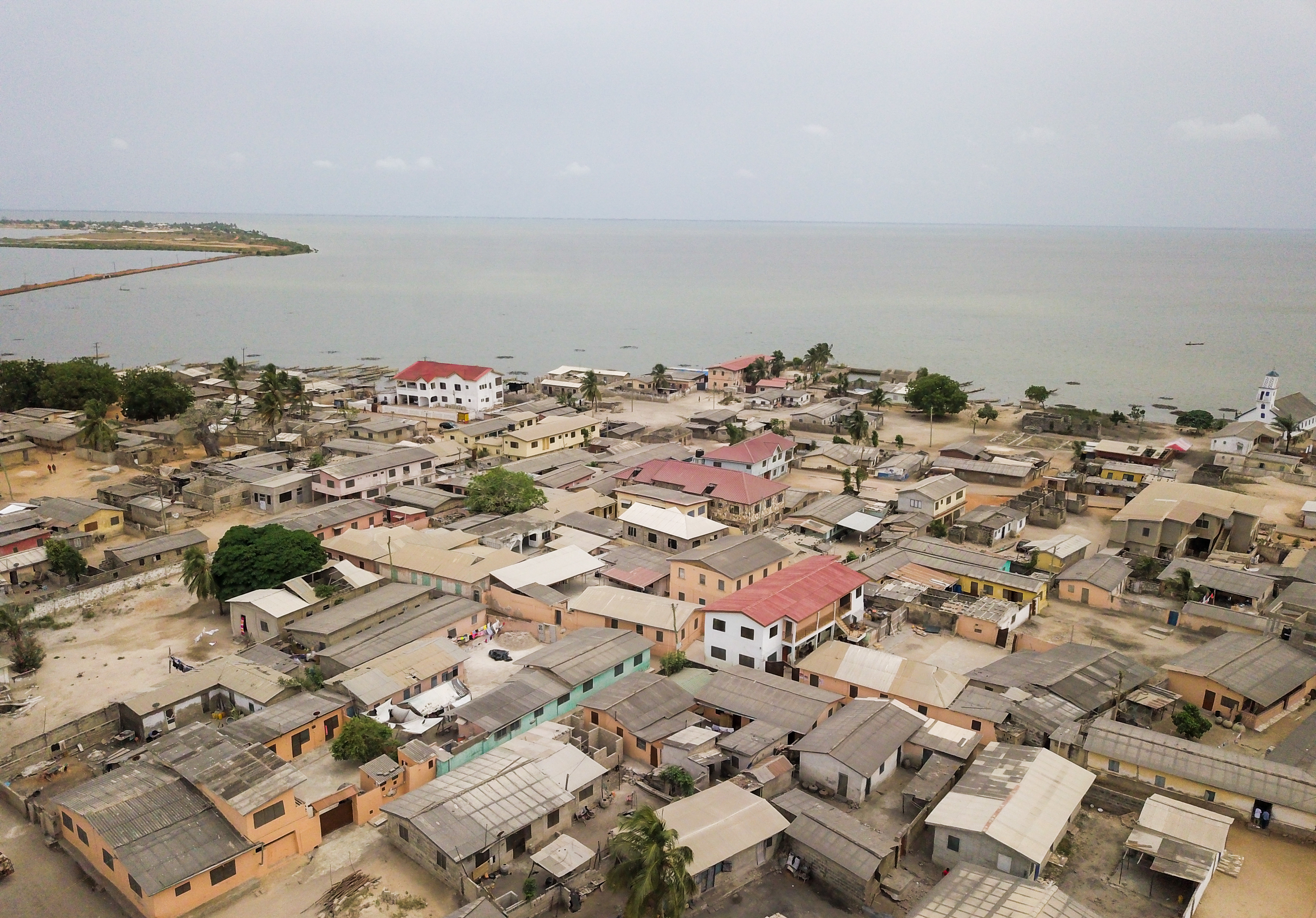
Aerial view of Anyako

- Konu
- Atigate
- Aborme
- Woeto
- Lashibi
- Aƒegame
- Kpota

== Contribution to Ghanaian politics ==
Anyako produced many political figures in Ghana's history. The 1st Inspector General of Police of Ghana John Willie Kofi Harlley who was also a former foreign minister of Ghana; and a member of the Presidential Commission that ruled Ghana during the military era of the National Liberation Council came from Anyako.

== Culture ==
Some popular foods eaten by the locals include Akple, Yakayake, Abolo and Gbɔvilolo kalami, Agbeli kaklo kple azi, and Ayikple.

== Education ==
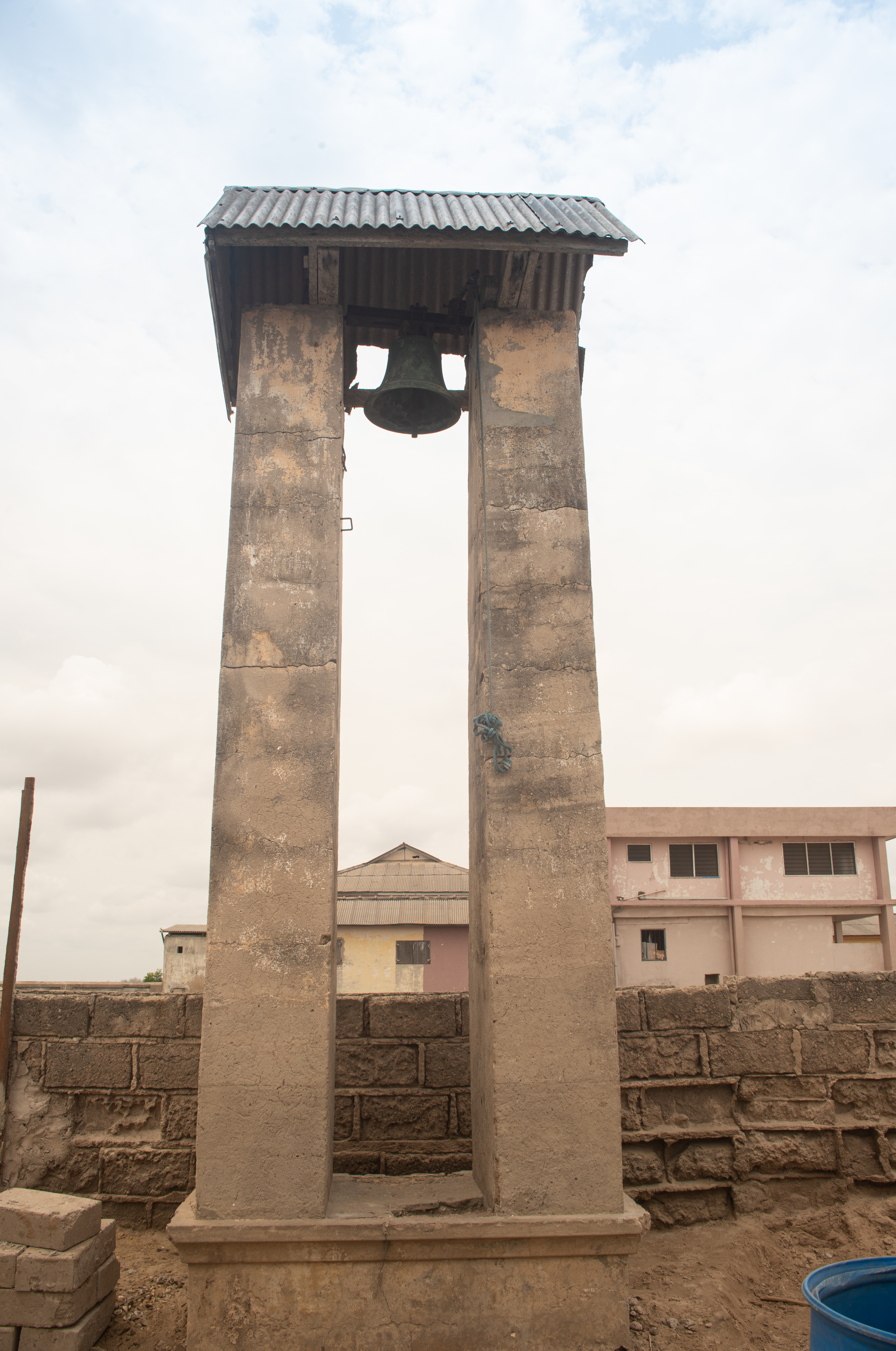
School bell tower

Anyako has a senior high school and three basic and junior high schools. The second cycle institutions is known as Anyako Secondary School, which is a formerly known as Anlo Awoamefia School. The basic and junior schools are E.P. Basic School, A.A. Fia/L.A. Basic and Junior Schools, and R.C. Basic and Junior Schools.

== Notable people ==
- John Willie Kofi Harlley was Ghana's first Inspector General of Police of the Ghana Police Service (IGP). He was the deputy chairman of the NLC government and also served in multiple ministerial roles including serving as Minister for Foreign Affairs and Minister for the Interior.
- El Anatsui is a contemporary artist. He has lived in Nigeria since 1975. He was awarded the Golden Lion for Life Achievement at the Venice Biennale (2015) and has received honorary degrees from Harvard University, University of Cape Town, and Kwame Nkrumah University of Science and Technology, Accra.
- Komla Agbeli Gbedemah was a Ghanaian politician and Minister for Finance in Ghana's Nkrumah government between 1954 and 1961.
- Alex Segbefia - Deputy Chief of Staff and Minister of Health during Atta Mills and John Mahama's government respectively.
- Ignatius Kutu Acheampong - Former Military Leader and Head of State of Ghana.
- Isaac Dogboe - Former World Boxing Organization super bantamweight champion.
- Corporal Patrick Gagbale Attipoe- He was a Ghanaian ex-serviceman and veteran of World War II. He was one of the three veterans shot dead by Major Imray. while on their way to present a petition to Sir Gerald Creasy who was Governor of Gold Coast at the time. The death of these three ex-servicemen led to the 1948 Accra Riots. In his loving memory, his statue has been unveiled at Kpota.
