= Kenneth Gilbert Adjei =

Ghanaian politician

Kenneth Gilbert Adjei is a Ghanaian politician who currently serves as minister in charge of Ministry of Defence (Ghana). He also served as a Deputy Minister of Defence from 2015 to 2017 during the John Mahama Administration. He is a member of the National Democratic Congress.

== Early life and education ==
Adjei is a native of Trede, in the Ashanti Region of Ghana. He attended Opoku Ware School for his secondary school education. He served as the Dining Hall prefect whilst at Opoku Ware School. He proceeded to the Ghana Institute of Management and Public Administration (GIMPA) where he completed with a Bachelor of Science degree in marketing. He also holds a Masters of Business Administration (MBA) from the University of Ghana Business School.

== Career ==
Adjei was the Program Director of the Lordina Foundation, a foundation founded by Lordina Mahama, the first Lady of Ghana. He is a marketing executive who previously served as a member of the Board of the National Lottery Authority and currently serves as a board executive of the Lordina foundation.

== Politics ==
Adjei is a member of the National Democratic Congress and was a member of Tertiary Education Institution Network (TEIN) of the NDC during his time at GIMPA. In March 2015, he was appointed by President John Dramani Mahama to serve as the deputy Minister of Defence. He was vetted on 15 April 2015, approved on 14 May and sworn in on 18 May 2015. He served in that role until 7 January 2017 when his government handed over to the Nana Akufo Addo government.

In February 2025, he was appointed by John Mahama as Minister of Ministry of Works and Housing (Ghana).

On 7 August 2026, President John Mahama reassigned Adjei from the Ministry of Works, Housing and Water Resources to the Ministry of Defence as part of a cabinet reshuffle. He formally assumed office as minister for defence on 14 August 2026.

== Personal life ==
Adjei is married with three children. He enjoys listening to music and playing golf during his leisure hours.
