= J. M. Kporvi =

Ghanaian politician and civil servant

Northern Regional Commissioner
- In office 1966–1967
- President: Joseph Arthur Ankrah
- Preceded by: Ebenezer Adam
- Succeeded by: Colonel P. Laryea

Personal details
- Born: Gold Coast
- Citizenship: Ghanaian

J. M. Kporvi was a Ghanaian civil servant, politician and, member of the National Liberation Council. He was the Assistant Commissioner of the Ghana Police Service and the Commissioner for the Northern Region from 1966 to 1967. He was succeeded by Col. P. Laryea.
