= National Liberation Council =

Government in Ghana from 1966 to 1969

Overview
- Established: 24 February 1966
- Dissolved: 1 October 1969
- State: Ghana
- Leader: Chairmen: Joseph Arthur Ankrah (24 February 1966 – 2 April 1969); Akwasi Afrifa (2 April 1969 – 3 September 1969)
- Headquarters: Accra

The National Liberation Council (NLC) led the Ghanaian government from 24 February 1966 to 1 October 1969. The body emerged from a coup d'état against the Nkrumah government carried out jointly by the Ghana Police Service and Ghana Armed Forces with collaboration from the Ghana Civil Service.

The new government implemented structural adjustment policies recommended by the International Monetary Fund (IMF) and World Bank. National enterprises, property, and capital were privatized or abandoned. Nkrumah had condemned the development projects of multinational corporations as signs of neocolonialism. The NLC allowed foreign conglomerates to operate on extremely favorable terms. The Ghanaian cedi was devalued by 30%. These economic changes did not succeed in reducing the country's debt or in increasing the ratio of exports to imports.

The National Liberation Council regime won support from powerful groups in Ghanaian society: local chiefs, intelligentsia, and business leaders, as well as the expanding military and police forces. However, its policies of economic austerity were not beloved of workers at large, who suffered from increasing unemployment and repression of strikes. In 1969 the regime underwent a carefully managed transition to civilian rule. Elections held on 29 August 1969 thus inaugurated a new government led by the NLC's chosen successor: the Progress Party of Kofi Abrefa Busia.

1970 Pulitzer Prize recipient investigative journalist Seymour Hersh, has brought to the table convincing reports about the Central Intelligence Agency involvement in the coup d'état, although his main source, an ex-agent, remains anonymous.

== Early events ==
=== Formation of Council ===
Francis Kwashie, part of the core planning group for the takeover, later commented that he and his comrades lacked "the faintest idea" of how to proceed upon gaining power. Several participants seemed to believe that the victorious officers would simply handpick acceptable civilian administrators and put them in charge. Marginalizing Nkrumah and other radicals would allow a sort of merger between the Convention People's Party and the opposition United Party, and the work of government could go on. The group decided that an interim government was necessary and went about determining its membership. Kokota and Harlley, the most obvious candidates for nominal leadership, turned the position down, preferring instead to retain command over their respective forces. Thus, on February 21 (the day Nkrumah left the country; three days before the coup) the group selected J. A. Ankrah, a popular general who suffered involuntary retirement in August 1965.

The decision to form a ruling council was made on the morning of the coup, at a meeting which included Harlley, Kokota, and Ankrah (but excluded a number of the original group) as well as Emmanuel Noi Omaboe, head of the Central Bureau of Statistics, Supreme Court Justice Fred Kwasi Apaloo, Director of Public Prosecutions Austin N. E. Amissah, and security officer D. S. Quacoopome. The name of the military government "National Liberation Council" was reportedly proposed by General Kotoka as an alternative to "National Revolutionary Council"—to indicate that the new leaders sought to liberate the country from Nkrumah and the CPP rather than to transform society.

The council consisted of four soldiers and four police officers.

- Major Gen. J. A. Ankrah - Chairman of the NLC and Head of State (24 February 1966 – 3 April 1969)
- Mr. J.W.K. Harlley (Inspector General of Police) - Vice Chairman of the NLC
- Lt. Col. Emmanuel K. Kotoka (24 February 1966 – 17 April 1967)
- Major Akwasi Amankwaa Afrifa
- Mr. B. A. Yakubu (Deputy Commissioner of Police)
- Col. Albert Kwesi Ocran
- Mr. Anthony K. Deku (Commissioner of Police, CID)
- Mr. J. E. O. Nunoo (Commissioner of Police, Administration)

With this membership, the Council displayed more ethnic diversity than did the core group of coup planners. Two members, Nunoo and Yakubu, had no advance knowledge of the coup at all.

=== Immediate political changes and continuities ===
Three committees—the Economic Committee, the Administrative Committee, and the Publicity Committee—manifested on the day of the coup as organs of government. The Economic Committee, in particular, was composed of high-ranking members of the pre-existing civil service and played the lead role in creating the policies of the new government. The coup leaders and the "technocrats" of the civil service shared the view that politics and politicians needed to be set aside in order to set up a more effective government apparatus. The military and police, lacking knowledge of economics and governance, relied on the civil service to concoct and engineer the necessary changes.

The first Proclamation of the new government, issued two days after the coup, suspended Ghana's 1960 Constitution, dismissed Nkrumah, dissolved the National Assembly and the Convention Peoples' Party, and named Ankrah as chairman and Harlley as deputy chairman. Next, the Council declared its intention to restore civilian government "as soon as possible" and its plan for separation of powers between executive, legislative, and judicial branches. The Council decreed that the judicial system would continue along the same model, but judges were asked to take new oaths in which they agreed to abide by government decrees. (In practice, military commissions would take authority over judicial functions of political importance.)

The new government made membership in the Convention People's Party illegal and took hundreds of people into "protective custody". These included former members of parliament and district commissioners, as well as 446 people affiliated directly with Nkrumah—including his financial advisor and his driver. Leaders of the Ghana Muslim Council were dismissed on the grounds of their party loyalties. Formation of new political parties was banned. Commissioners were established to investigate corruption in the previous regime and to organize the continued suppression of the CPP.

The NLC disbanded and confiscated the assets of eight Nkrumaist organizations, including the United Ghana Farmers' Co-operative Council, the National Council of Ghana Women and the Ghana Youth Pioneers. Boy Scouts and Girl Guides groups were introduced to replace the latter.

Once the CPP was no longer seen as a political threat, the new government indicated that it would not retaliate excessively against officials from the old regime. All but twenty of the hundreds of imprisoned Nkrumaists were free by 1968. And although the system of ministries was re-arranged, the membership and hierarchy of the civil service remained mostly intact, and in fact gained power after the coup.

B. A. Bentum (verily a CPP minister himself) was appointed Secretary-General of the Trades Union Congress and authorized to cull its old CPP leadership. Bentum dissociated the Trades Union Congress from the All-African Trade Union Federation, began a "Productivity Drive" to raise output, helped the government with public relations abroad, and created a mechanism for supplying civilian workers to assist the armed forces.

=== Popular support ===
Public demonstrations were held in support of the new government, especially by public organizations in Accra. Nkrumah, in China, claimed that the military had orchestrated these demonstrations. In part because Nigeria's military had accomplished a coup of its own in January 1966, regime change in Ghana did not come as a complete shock. Under new leadership, groups like the Trades Union Congress and the Ghana Young Pioneers (shortly before they were disbanded) celebrated the coup and renounced Nkrumaist socialism. On March 4, top Nkrumah aide Emmanuel Ayeh-Kumi publicly accused the former President of corruption. Other party leaders followed suit. The government released more than 800 prisoners from the previous regime.

By June 1966, spokesmen for the new government began to qualify their statements on the restoration of civilian government, saying more time was needed "to establish an effective machinery of government" and for people "to readjust to the new situation". Rule by the National Liberation Council was sustained by strong support from the intelligentsia, in the civil service and at university, as well as by the military and police forces themselves.

=== Diplomatic realignment ===
Diplomatic relations with Russia, China, and Cuba were ceased, their embassies closed, and their technicians ejected. Ghana withdrew its embassies from these countries, from Hanoi in North Vietnam, and from five countries in Eastern Europe.

From the West, the coup was immediately rewarded by food aid and a relaxation of the policies designed to isolate Ghana. World cocoa prices began to increase. Relations with Britain, which had been suspended over the Rhodesia issue, were restored.

Robert Komer of the National Security Council wrote to Lyndon Johnson,

The coup in Ghana is another example of a fortuitous windfall. Nkrumah was doing more to undermine our interests than any other black African. In reaction to his strongly pro-Communist leanings, the new military regime is almost pathetically pro-Western. The point of this memo is that we ought to follow through skillfully and consolidate such successes. A few thousand tons of surplus wheat or rice, given now when the new regimes are quite uncertain as to their future relations with us, could have a psychological significance out of all proportion to the cost of the gesture. I am not arguing for lavish gifts to these regimes—indeed, giving them a little only whets their appetites, and enables us to use the prospect of more as leverage.

— Robert W. Komer, Memorandum to President Johnson, 12 March 1966

Leaders in the new regime, as well as observers in business and the press, declared Ghana open for business with Western multinationals. Representatives from the IMF and the World Bank arrived in Accra in March 1966, quickly establishing a plan for "very close collaboration".

== Military affairs ==
=== Budget ===
One declaration in March 1966 exempted members of the military from paying taxes, restored their pension plan, and entitled them to various public amenities. Army, Navy, Air Force, and Police personnel received cash bonuses of undisclosed size.

Between 1966 and 1969, military spending doubled, from NȻ 25.5 million to NȻ54.2 million.

=== Status ===
The military borrowed techniques from the British to upgrade the social status of the armed forces; for example, they used publicity in magazines to create an image of the soldier as a powerful, humane, elite member of society. These policies dramatically increased Ghanaians' interest in military careers.

The coup plotters from within the armed forces all promoted themselves to higher ranks and eventually all had become some sort of General. The preferred philosopher of this group was Plato, whose Republic offers the slogan: "The punishment which the wise suffer who refuse to take part in the Government is to live under the Government of worse men."

Britain turned down the new government's request for military uniforms, but the United States was willing to supply some, and thus U.S. Army uniforms were worn by the Ghanaian Army.

=== Counter-coup ===
Junior officers attempted an unsuccessful coup on 17 April 1967. The three leaders of this counter-coup were young officers from the Akan ethnic group. With a force of 120 men, they succeeded in capturing the State Broadcasting House and the former president's house, into which General Kokota had moved. General Kokota died in the fighting, and Lt.-Gen Ankrah escaped by climbing over a wall and jumping into the ocean. The rebel officers laid siege to the military headquarters and announced themselves over state radio. However, the plotters were outmaneuvered at a conference held to determine plans for the new government, and subsequently captured.

The counter-coup was widely believed to be motivated by divisions between the southwestern (Akan, Ashanti, Fanti) ethnic groups and the southeastern (Ga, Ewe) ethnic groups—so much so that the military issued an official statement denying it.

Three hundred soldiers and six hundred civilians were jailed in retaliation. On May 26, 1967, two officers convicted of treason became the subjects of Ghana's first public execution. Fearing future actions from within the military, the NLC decommissioned eight senior officers and reappointed some of its own members to command positions. Air Marshal Michael Otu was accused of subversion in November 1968.

== Political governance ==
The council established many commissions and advisory committees to make policies and engage with civil society. Various committees were assigned to areas such as the economy, public relations, foreign relations, law, farming, and the structure of government itself (which did indeed undergo frequent reorganization). Regional and local commissioners were replaced by "management committees"; administrative districts were consolidated from 168 to 47. The management committees were constituted mostly by civil servants as well as one private citizen nominated by the police. Many personnel from the old councils participated in the new committees. Subsequent involvement of military officials in the local management committees did not functionally challenge the political dominance of the civil service. The power of the civil service proved a source of resentment from other groups within the constituency of the 1966 coup.

The heads of ministries were designated as commissioners and their deputies as principal secretaries.

OFFICE	NAME	TERM
Commissioner for Foreign Affairs	Joseph Arthur Ankrah	1966 – 1967
Commissioner for Foreign Affairs	John Willie Kofi Harlley	1967 – 1968
Commissioner for Foreign Affairs	Patrick Dankwa Anin	1969
Commissioner for Defence	Lt. Gen. Emmanuel Kotoka	1966 – 1967
Commissioner for Defence	Lt. Gen. J. A. Ankrah	1967 – 1969
Commissioner for Defence	Lt. Gen. Akwasi Afrifa	1968 – 1969
Commissioner for Interior	Anthony K. Deku	Feb 1966 – Mar 1966
Commissioner for Interior	John Willie Kofi Harlley	Mar 1966 – Aug 1969
Commissioner for Finance	Akwasi Amankwa Afrifa	1966 – April 1969
Commissioner for Finance	J. H. Mensah	April 1969 – September 1969
Attorney General of Ghana	Victor Owusu	1 October 1966 – 13 April 1969
Attorney General of Ghana	Nicholas Yaw Boafo Adade	April 1969 – September 1969
Commissioner for Economic Affairs	Emmanuel Noi Omaboe	1966 – 1969
Commissioner for Education	Modjaben Dowuona	1966 – 1969
Commissioner for Health	Eustace Akwei	1966 – 1969
Commissioner for Agriculture	Jacob Ofori Torto	1967 – 1968
Commissioner for Agriculture	Albert Adomakoh	1968 – 1969
Commissioner for Agriculture	K. Twum Barima	1969
Commissioner for Communications	Patrick Dankwa Anin	1966 – 1968
Commissioner for Communications	Matthew Poku	Feb 1968 – Apr 1969
Commissioner for Social Affairs; Commissioner for Labour and Social Welfare	S. T. Nettey	1966 – 1969
Commissioner for Information	K.G. Osei Bonsu	1966 – January 1968
Commissioner for Information	Ibrahim Mahama	1968
Commissioner for Information	Issifu Ali	1969
Commissioner for Industry	R. S. Amegashie	1966–1968
Commissioner for Industry	J. V. L. Phillips	1968–1969
Commissioner for Land and Mineral Resources	J. V. L. Phillips	1966–1968
Commissioner for Land and Mineral Resources	R. S. Amegashie	1968–1969
Commissioner for Local Government	Dr. Alex A. Y. Kyerematen	1966–1969
Commissioner for Trade	R. A. Quarshie	1966–1968
Commissioner for Trade	J. V. L. Phillips	1968–1969
Commissioner for Works and Housing	Issifu Ali	1966– April 1969
Commissioner for Works and Housing	Lt. Colonel E. A. Yeboah	1969
Commissioner for Rural Development	I. M. Ofori	1969
Commissioner for Cultural Affairs	Anthony K. Deku	1969

=== Regional Administration Chairmen (Regional Ministers) ===
Portfolio	Minister	Time frame	Notes
Ashanti Regional Commissioner	Brig. D. C. K. Amenu	1966 – 1967	
Ashanti Regional Commissioner	J. T. D. Addy	1967	
Ashanti Regional Commissioner	G. K. Yarboi	1967 – 1969	
Brong Ahafo Region	Lt. Col. I. K Akyeampong	1966 – 1967	
Brong Ahafo Region	Lt. Col. H. D. Twum-Barimah	1967 – 1968	
Brong Ahafo Region	J. Agyemang Badu	1968 – 1969	
Central Regional Commissioner	Lt.-Col R. J. G. Dontoh	1966 – 1967	
Central Regional Commissioner	Brig. Alexander A. Crabbe	1967 – 1969	
Eastern Regional Commissioner	G. A. K. Dzansi	1966 – 1969	
Greater Accra Regional Commissioner	Rear Admiral D. A. Hansen	1966 – 1967	
Greater Accra Regional Commissioner	J. G. Smith	1967 – 1969	
Northern Regional Commissioner	J. M. Kporvi	1966 – 1967	
Northern Regional Commissioner	Col. P. Laryea	1967 – 1968	
Northern Regional Commissioner	Seth Birikorang	1968 – 1969	
Northern Regional Commissioner	H. A. Nuamah	1969	
Upper Region	J. W. O. Adjemang	1966 – 1967	
Upper Region	Imoru Lafia	1967 – 1969	
Volta Regional Commissioner	E. Q. Q. Sanniez	1966 – 1967	
Volta Regional Commissioner	Col. E. N. Dedjoe	1967 – 1968	
Volta Regional Commissioner	E. C. Beckley	1968 – 1969	
Western Region	Lt.-Col. J. T. D. Addy	1966 – 1967	
Western Region	Lt. Col. I. K. Acheampong	1967 – 1968	
Western Region	Lt. Col. E. A. Yeboah	1968 – 1969	
Western Region	Lt. Col. Coker-Appiah	1969	

=== Principal Secretaries to the Ministries ===
Portfolio	Minister	Time frame	Notes
Establishment Secretariat	A. O. Mills	1966 – 1969	
Chieftaincy Secretariat	E. O. N. Aryee	1966 – 1969	
Ministry of Foreign Affairs	F. E. Boaten	1966 – 1969	
Ministry of Defence	D. E. Awotwi	1966 – 1969	
Ministry of Interior	N. K. F. Owoo	1966 – 1969	
Ministry of Finance	K. Gyasi-Twum	1966 – 1969	
Ministry of Economic Affairs	B. K. Mensah	1966 – 1969	
Ministry for Education	D. A. Brown	1966 – 1969	
Ministry of Health	W. Y. Eduful	1966 – 1969	
Ministry of Agriculture and Forestry	C. A. Dadey (Agriculture); R. Kofi-Johnson(Forestry)	1966 – 1969	
Ministry of Communication	E. A. Winful	1966 – 1969	
Ministry of Social Affairs	J. K. Chinebuah	1966 – 1969	
Ministry of Information	J. B. Odunton	1966 – 1969	
Ministry of Industry	E. R. Hayford	1966 – 1969	
Ministry for Land and Mineral Resources	A. J. Prah	1966 – 1969	
Ministry for Local Government	G. F. Daniel	1966 – 1969	
Ministry for Works and Housing	H. F. Winful	1966 – 1969	

Whereas the Convention People's Party had claimed legitimacy from its status as a mass party, the new regime increased the role of intermediate groups to interact with the public at large. Many of these groups, including religious, legal, and economic organizations established before the CPP, had opposed the one-party system and found they could work effectively with the military government.

Chiefs such as the powerful Asantehene approved of the regime change, which they saw as restoring their power after years of African socialism. The NLC "destooled" at least 176 chiefs appointed during the Nkrumah era. To the dismay of tenant farmers, the NLC granted the chiefs' collective request for more favorable economic policies such as an end to the cap on land rent.

In November 1968 the government established a Constituent Assembly, which contained representatives from 91 organizations such as the House of Chiefs, the Ghana Midwives' Association, and the National Catholic Secretariat.

The NLC integrated government intelligence gathering with military and police forces, thereby increasing the effectiveness of both.

=== Civil liberties ===
Austerity and unemployment led to unrest and crime, which the government met with repression by police and military forces. In January 1967, the NLC authorized the use of military tribunals for civilians accused of subversion.

The country's two largest daily papers, the Daily Graphic and the Ghanaian Times, remained state-owned. These newspapers readily changed their allegiance from the Nkrumah government to the National Liberation Council. Other newspapers, such as the Legon Observer published at the University of Ghana, were more critical of the regime.

In general, the press was allowed limited criticism of government policies, but were sufficiently intimidated that they did not question the legitimacy of the government itself, nor advocate for an alternative regime. Early words about "freedom of the press" were somewhat undermined by caveats and retaliatory actions. The "Prohibition of Rumour Decree" issued in October 1966 authorized 28 days of detention and up to three years in prison for journalists who might "cause alarm and despondency", "disturb the public peace", or "cause disaffection against the N.L.C." Criticism of the 1967 arrangement between the American firm Abbott Laboratories with the State Pharmaceutical Corporation led the NLC to fire four editors from the nation's three leading newspapers.

Books including Nkrumah's Dark Days in Ghana were allowed into the country.

Complaints about immigration and foreign business activity led to a rule published in 1968 which starting on July 1, 1968, barred non-Ghanaians from operating retail and small wholesale businesses, driving taxis, or running other small businesses with fewer than 30 workers. Another decree restricted where non-Ghanaians could live.

== Economics ==
The new government empowered the International Monetary Fund to supervise the country's economy. Under IMF influence, the government cut spending, limited wage increases, and allowed foreign companies to conduct businesses operations on their own terms. The overall result was a shift away from the CPP's efforts at national industrialization, towards resource extraction and limited manufacturing for short-term profits—most of which were gleaned by foreign companies and elites within government including the military. The National Liberation Council did not receive the debt relief it expected in exchange for cooperation with outside financial institutions, and indeed Ghana's debt increased by Ȼ89.7 million under agreements made in 1966 and 1968.

The Economic Committee, headed by E. N. Omaboe, was responsible for economic policy and played an influential role in the overall government. The organization of this committee predated the formation of the National Liberation Council itself, and Omaboe was involved in the planning meeting to create the NLC on February 24, 1966. R. S. Amegashie, Director of the Business School at Achimota, was another influential member.

=== Privatization and multinational business ===
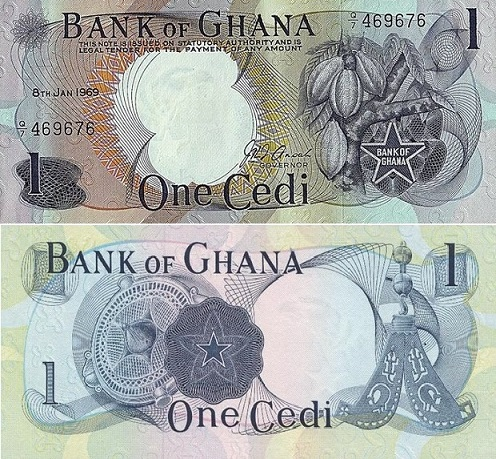
1 New Cedi (NȻ) note

The NLC promised "structural changes" of state corporations, some of which were fully privatized. The Ghana Industrial Holding Corporation, created in September 1967, became owner of 19 such corporations. Control over large production sectors was granted to foreign multinational corporations such as Norway Cement Export and Abbott Laboratories. These ventures held extremely low risk for the foreign companies, since they relied on capital already within Ghana, enjoyed various economic privileges, and had outside backing to prevent expropriation.

Under guidance of the International Monetary Fund, the government in 1967 devalued the Ghanaian Cedi (formerly the Ghanaian pound) by 30% relative to the United States dollar. The rationale for this policy was that if other countries could buy Ghanaian goods at lower prices, exports would increase, and conversely imports would decrease. In fact, the opposite results occurred. Exports of all commodities except wood and diamonds decreased. Imports increased by a larger factor.

Various state-run development projects were abandoned, including some which were nearly complete. These included manufacturing and refining operations under state control which would have competed with foreign business interests. A plan to stockpile cocoa (the top export at the time) in order to take improve Ghana's position in the world market, was canceled; the nearly-built silos, intended to accomplish this goal, allowed to fall into disrepair. Agricultural projects were privatized or canceled and newly purchased equipment left in fields to rust. Overall spending on agriculture decreased by 35%. A fleet of fishing boats were grounded to lie idle and deteriorating—leading the country to begin importing foreign fish. Much of the capital and property obtained by the state from 1957 to 1966 now fell into the hands of the private sector.

=== Labour and quality of life ===
Under the National Liberation Council, inflation decreased, production went up, and wages rose. The minimum wage increased from 0.65 cedi to 0.70 cedi in 1967 and 0.75 cedi in 1968. However, fewer people had jobs—and even for those who did, higher costs of living offset some of the wage increases. Food prices increased dramatically due to the collapse of state-run agriculture and withdrawal of credit to independent farmers. In the public sector, minimum wage rose from Ȼ0.70 to Ȼ0.75, with future increases capped at 5%, while top wages increased by much more. Judges, high-ranking civil servants, and university professors received job benefits and raises.

Most of the profits from higher productivity went to business owners and foreign investors, and society became more economically stratified.

The new regime made some initial concessions to workers, such as an increase in the threshold of taxable income, and a decrease in taxes (and thus prices) of some basic goods. The goodwill generated by these initial policies faded when 38,000 people lost their jobs in July–October 1966 and requests for a NȻ1/day basic wage were soundly rejected. Strikes were illegal and in February 1967 incitement to general strike became a crime punishable by 25+ years in prison, or by death. The Trades Union Congress, under the leadership of B. A. Bentum (the chief civilian collaborator in the 1966 coup), made efforts to prevent these strikes from happening, and was therefore widely distrusted by workers.

Workers in Ghana went on strike 58 times from 1966 to 1967, 38 times in 1968, and 51 times in 1969. Strikers were fired and sometimes fired upon. The latter happened at a gold mine in Obuasi in March 1969. By August 1968, 66,000 workers (representing 10% of the national workforce and 36% of the Accra workforce) had lost their jobs.

== Nkrumah in exile ==
Nkrumah left China and traveled to Guinea, arriving in Conakry on March 2, 1966. Guinean President Sékou Touré named Nkrumah as co-president, supplying him with a place to live, a staff, food, office supplies, etc. He occupied himself with reading, writing, and political discussion; he reportedly sometimes listened to vinyl recordings of Black Americans activists like Malcolm X and Stokely Carmichael. He turned away Western reporters seeking interviews. He was loosely involved in various intrigues to dethrone the military regime in Ghana.

Nkrumah remained an intellectual leader of the Pan-Africanist movement and continued to articulate visions of African Revolution. In his 1968 book Dark Days in Ghana, Nkrumah placed the struggles of Ghana in the context of 15 military coups which took place in Africa between 1962 and 1967. The same year, he published Handbook of Revolutionary Warfare, addressing revolutionary warriors in Angola, Mozambique, South Africa, and Rhodesia and expanding his analysis to Southeast Asia and Latin America. His ideology became more overtly communist, and in 1969 he wrote, in Class Struggle in Africa, that Pan-African socialism would "advance the triumph of the international socialist revolution, and the onward progress towards world communism, under which, every society is ordered on the principle of from each according to his ability, to each according to his needs."

The government declared a campaign to eliminate the "myth of Nkrumah", which involved pulling down Nkrumah's statue, renaming various streets and institutions, and "re-educating" the public through other channels. Thus a public relations campaign was launched to "destroy the image of Nkrumah"—and thus legitimize the coup—among people in rural areas. The Ministry of Information deployed 37 vans for 12 weeks to visit 700 villages promoting the new government.

== Transition to civilian government ==
Plans were made to transfer the government to civilian rule, headed by K. A. Busia, the leader of a former opposition party outlawed by Nkrumah. In May 1968, General Ankrah announced plans for the transition to take place on September 30, 1969. In the interim, a Constituent Assembly would draft a new constitution, and political parties would be legalized starting May 1, 1969. Busia had obviously been selected to lead the new government.

To ensure that the transition in power would not create a transition in policy, the NLC passed various regulations to limit the scope of political change. For example, it banned high-level CPP members from serving in government (creating exceptions to this rule for some of the latter it had already appointed).

The National Liberation Council underwent some internal turmoil during this period. Ethnic tension intensified after the 1967 counter-coup, which resulted in the death of Kotoka, an important Ewe general. General Otu and an aide were arrested on 20 November 1968, accused of plotting in London to restore Nkrumah to power. Ankrah, the Head of State, was forced to resign on April 2, 1969, amidst accusations that he was planning to form a political party and run for president. Afrifa was appointed his successor. Otu and Ankrah were both members of the Ga ethnic group, and when Assistant Police Commissioner John E. O. Nunoo, himself Ga, suggested that ethnicity might have motivated the aforementioned actions, he himself was fired.

A new constitution, passed on 15 August 1969, provided for a judiciary, a unicameral legislature, a prime minister, and a president.

Five political parties went into action for the August 29 elections. Of these, the largest were the Progress Party, led by longtime opposition politician K.A. Busia, and the National Alliance of Liberals, led by former Finance Minister and coup plotter K. A. Gbedemah. Gbedemah, a Ewe, was supported by Ewe elements within the NLC, to oppose Busia, an Ashanti. Members of the two groups voted markedly along these lines, but in the nationwide results Busia and the Progress Party won the sizeable majority of seats: 105 of 140. Before handing over power, the NLC passed an ambiguous constitutional amendment which empowered them to expel Gbedemah from parliament.

Preceded by Nkrumah government (1957-1966) (Convention Peoples' Party)	Government of Ghana; 1966 – 1969	Succeeded by Busia government (1969-1972) (Progress Party)
