= Chairperson of the Organisation of African Unity =

International body office (1963–2002)

The Chairperson of the Organisation of African Unity served as the head of the Organisation of African Unity, a rotating position.

== List ==
No.	Portrait	Chairperson	Took office	Left office	Country	Region
1		Haile Selassie	25 May 1963	17 July 1964	Ethiopia	East Africa
2		Gamal Abdel Nasser	17 July 1964	21 October 1965	Egypt	North Africa
3		Kwame Nkrumah	21 October 1965	24 February 1966	Ghana	West Africa
4		Joseph Arthur Ankrah	24 February 1966	5 November 1966	Ghana	West Africa
(1)		Haile Selassie	5 November 1966	11 September 1967	Ethiopia	East Africa
5		Mobutu Sese Seko	11 September 1967	13 September 1968	Democratic Republic of the Congo	Central Africa
6		Houari Boumédiène	13 September 1968	6 September 1969	Algeria	North Africa
7		Ahmadou Ahidjo	6 September 1969	1 September 1970	Cameroon	Central Africa
8		Kenneth Kaunda	1 September 1970	21 June 1971	Zambia	Southern Africa
9		Moktar Ould Daddah	21 June 1971	12 June 1972	Mauritania	North Africa
10		Hassan II	12 June 1972	27 May 1973	Morocco	North Africa
11		Yakubu Gowon	27 May 1973	12 June 1974	Nigeria	West Africa
12	https://encrypted-tbn0.gstatic.com/images?q=tbn:ANd9GcSOtqSNK2ZIb5zFanEwC8Vao39sBTcnYw1FY1MOLskJXJZCd23CeVoLjVU&s=10	Siad Barre	12 June 1974	28 July 1975	Somalia	East Africa
13		Idi Amin	28 July 1975	2 July 1976	Uganda	East Africa
14		Seewoosagur Ramgoolam	2 July 1976	2 July 1977	Mauritius	Southern Africa
15		Omar Bongo	2 July 1977	18 July 1978	Gabon	Central Africa
16		Gaafar Nimeiry	18 July 1978	12 July 1979	Sudan	East Africa
17		William Tolbert	12 July 1979	12 April 1980	Liberia	West Africa
		Léopold Sédar Senghor; Acting Chairperson	28 April 1980	1 July 1980	Senegal	West Africa
18		Siaka Stevens	1 July 1980	24 June 1981	Sierra Leone	West Africa
19		Daniel arap Moi	24 June 1981	6 June 1983	Kenya	East Africa
20		Mengistu Haile Mariam	6 June 1983	12 November 1984	Ethiopia	East Africa
21		Julius Nyerere	12 November 1984	18 July 1985	Tanzania	East Africa
22		Abdou Diouf	18 July 1985	28 July 1986	Senegal	West Africa
23		Denis Sassou-Nguesso	28 July 1986	27 July 1987	People's Republic of the Congo	Central Africa
(8)		Kenneth Kaunda	27 July 1987	25 May 1988	Zambia	Southern Africa
24		Moussa Traoré	25 May 1988	24 July 1989	Mali	West Africa
25		Hosni Mubarak	24 July 1989	9 July 1990	Egypt	North Africa
26		Yoweri Museveni	9 July 1990	3 June 1991	Uganda	East Africa
27		Ibrahim Babangida	3 June 1991	29 June 1992	Nigeria	West Africa
(23)		Abdou Diouf	29 June 1992	28 June 1993	Senegal	West Africa
(26)		Hosni Mubarak	28 June 1993	13 June 1994	Egypt	North Africa
28		Zine El Abidine Ben Ali	13 June 1994	26 June 1995	Tunisia	North Africa
29		Meles Zenawi	26 June 1995	8 July 1996	Ethiopia	East Africa
30		Paul Biya	8 July 1996	2 June 1997	Cameroon	Central Africa
31		Robert Mugabe	2 June 1997	8 June 1998	Zimbabwe	Southern Africa
32		Blaise Compaoré	8 June 1998	12 July 1999	Burkina Faso	West Africa
33		Abdelaziz Bouteflika	12 July 1999	10 July 2000	Algeria	North Africa
34		Gnassingbé Eyadéma	10 July 2000	9 July 2001	Togo	West Africa
35		Frederick Chiluba	9 July 2001	2 January 2002	Zambia	Southern Africa
36		Levy Mwanawasa	2 January 2002	9 July 2002	Zambia	Southern Africa

== See also ==
- Chairperson of the African Union
