= Howard Bane =

American Central Intelligence Agency officer

- Born: August 5, 1927; Virginia, United States
- Died: July 27, 2007 (aged 79); Virginia, United States
- Occupation: CIA officer
- Espionage activity
- Allegiance: United States
- Service branch: Central Intelligence Agency

Howard Thomas Bane (August 5, 1927 – July 27, 2007) was an American Central Intelligence Agency (CIA) officer.

He started his career with the United States Department of the Army, running an operation to recover downed airmen during the Korean War. He transferred to the CIA and worked on the CIA Tibetan program.

He is particularly associated with his work in Africa including postings to Kenya and Ghana. Bane received the Intelligence Star for his key role in the 1966 pro-Western Ghanaian coup.

Bane helped coordinate the response to the 1974 French Embassy attack in The Hague and helped plan the CIA involvement in Operation Eagle Claw, an unsuccessful military intervention to resolve the Iran hostage crisis. He warned of the rise of Islamic jihadism but was hampered by cutbacks at the agency in the 1990s. He was brought out of retirement following the September 11 attacks to assist with a rapid expansion of the CIA and was awarded the Distinguished Intelligence Medal.

== Early life and career ==
Howard Thomas Bane was born on August 5, 1927, in Virginia, United States. He served as a research analyst with the Department of the Army between 1951 and 1955, during which time he ran an operation to rescue airmen shot down behind enemy lines in the Korean War. Bane later became an officer of the Central Intelligence Agency (CIA) and from 1955 served with them under the cover of a diplomatic service assistant attaché and political officer at the US embassy in Bangkok, Thailand. He rose to second secretary and then vice-consul by 1958. In 1959 he was appointed second secretary and political officer at the US Embassy in New Delhi, India, a position he held until 1962. During this posting he worked on the CIA Tibetan program as a go-between to protect the CIA's Harry Rositzke.

== Africa ==
After his posting to India, Bane moved to the CIA's African Division, heading the agency's station in Kenya. He was a keen recruiter of personnel for the CIA, securing 33 high-quality agents, often rising politicians or foreign intelligence agency employees, in the course of one three-year posting. Bane took up flying gliders as a means of getting close to one of these recruits. On another instance he secured a private meeting with a Soviet ambassador to an African state that was then in the midst of an anti-Soviet coup. The ambassador was suffering from heart palpitations, and Bane offered the use of his embassy's electrocardiogram machine, aware that the Soviets did not have access to one. Bane took the machine to the Soviet embassy and administered the test personally, using the opportunity to sound out the ambassador as a possible American agent. These actions gave him the nickname "Give-it-a-go Bane" from the response he got from his superiors when he proposed such audacious schemes. While in Africa he was responsible for gathering one million AK-47 assault rifles for the agency, which were shipped to Asia for use in the Laotian Civil War.

Bane was appointed chief of mission at the US embassy in Accra, Ghana, in 1964 and during this posting, according to former CIA officer John Stockwell, he played a key role in the 1966 pro-Western coup. Bane took the advantage of less oversight during an eight-month interim period between ambassadors following the departure of William P. Mahoney Jr. in 1965 to further the coup. He proposed a direct intervention by the CIA's Special Operations Group, but this was rejected. Instead Bane took advantage of his standing instructions to monitor the Ghanaian military to cultivate contacts there. He dropped hints that the CIA would support a coup carried out from within the military, which gave them the confidence to plan in earnest from mid-January 1966.

Bane was able to give his seniors at the CIA 24 hours notice of the coup, which took place in late February, despite press reports at the time that it came as a surprise to the US government. Bane is said to have helped monitor and plan the coup with a relatively small team of between 10 and 26 case officers and, through contacts with the coup leaders, was able to secure valuable classified Soviet equipment, including a spy camera disguised as a cigarette lighter. Bane managed the operation without keeping a single written record, limiting the chance of US involvement being proven. If the operation had failed Bane would have been transferred to another posting; as it was he was awarded the Intelligence Star and a double promotion for his success.

Bane had proposed going further and using the coup as cover for the Special Operations Group to storm the Chinese embassy in Accra, kill the occupants, and steal secret records. This would have been highly valuable to the agency, particularly as this was the only Chinese embassy in Africa at the time. Permission was refused, and Bane was said to be enraged that his superiors "didn't have the guts to do it". Bane left Ghana in 1967 and served as chief of operations at Nairobi between 1969 and 1974.

== The Hague and terrorism ==
Bane was appointed CIA station chief in The Hague just before the 1974 French Embassy attack in The Hague. He worked closely with the Dutch authorities during the crisis, and his efforts were rewarded with promotion to head the CIA's Office on Terrorism when it was founded in 1978. In January 1976 he was outed as a CIA agent by the Dutch magazine Vrij Nederland.

In 1979 he headed the CIA's involvement in Operation Eagle Claw, the unsuccessful American attempt to end the Iran hostage crisis by force. Bane secured the services of a former Yugoslav partisan who came out of retirement in Italy to work undercover in Iran. Had the operation gone to plan, the partisan would have played a key role in the rescue. At some point before 1989 Bane became head of the CIA's African Division and was awarded the Distinguished Intelligence Medal.

During the 1980s Bane was involved in a major reform of the CIA and also served as a member of President Ronald Reagan's transitional team and Vice President George HW Bush's Task Force on Terrorism. In the early 1990s Bane was one of the first CIA officers to recognize the threat posed by Islamic jihadism and tried to focus his teams on the Middle East. He spoke out against cuts made to the agency's operations and monitoring posts in the region. After the September 11 attacks he was brought out of retirement, on an annuity, to help run operations while the agency undertook major expansion. He attempted to pass on the creativity and innovation he demonstrated in his career to the new officers.

Bane, who chewed tobacco and smoked cigars, was diagnosed with cancer and on July 27, 2007, died in Virginia . During his 39-year career with the CIA he spent 20 years serving overseas.
