= I. M. Ofori =

Ghanaian Civil servant and academic (1927–2013)

Isaac Mensah Ofori

Minister for Rural Development
- In office April 1969 – September 1969
- Appointed by: Akwasi Afrifa
- Preceded by: New
- Succeeded by: Ministry abolished

Personal details
- Born: Isaac Mensah Ofori; 5 December 1927 Vakpo, Gold Coast
- Died: 27 April 2013 (aged 85)
- Education: Manchester University; King's College, Cambridge
- Occupation: Civil Servant; academic

Isaac Mensah Ofori (5 December 1927 – 27 April 2013) was a Ghanaian academic and Civil Servant. He was a Professor of Land Economy at the University of Zambia, he also served as Ghana's Commissioner (Minister) for Rural Development from April 1969 to September 1969.

== Biography ==
Ofori studied at Manchester University and King's College, Cambridge, both in the United Kingdom. Following his studies abroad, Ofori gained employment at the Kwame Nkrumah University of Science and Technology (then University of Science and Technology) as a lecturer in Land Economy and Regional Planning, and later joined the University of Ghana's Institute of Statistical Social and Economic Research as Senior Research Fellow.

In April 1969 a new ministry called the Ministry of Rural Development was created by the then government in power (the NLC government) and Ofori was appointed to take charge of the ministry. Ofori remained Commissioner (Minister) for Rural Development until September 1969 when the NLC government was dissolved to usher in civilian rule.

Ofori became a visiting professor at the Land Reform Training Institute of Taiwan, Republic of China since 1972. In 1983, he was appointed Professor of Land Economy in the School of Environmental Studies at the University of Zambia. He once served as the Secretary of the Environmental Protection Council of Ghana (now the Ghana Environmental Protection Agency).
