= Anthony Deku =

Ghanaian politician (1923–2015)

Anthony K. Deku

National Liberation Council Member
- In office 24 Feb 1966 – 1969
- President: Lt Gen J A Ankrah

Commissioner of Police (CID)
- In office 1966–1969

Member of the Council of State
- In office 2001–2009
- President: John Kufuor

Personal details
- Born: Anthony Kwashie Deku; June 13, 1923 Gold Coast
- Died: May 29, 2015 (aged 91) Ghana
- Party: New Patriotic Party
- Spouse: Mrs. Christina Sraha Deku
- Children: 7
- Occupation: Police Commissioner and Politician
- Profession: Politician and Police officer

Anthony K. Deku (13 June 1923 – 29 May 2015) was a politician and a member of the Council of State of Ghana. He served as an Aide to Ghana’s first President; Osagyefo Dr. Kwame Nkrumah. He was also a Commissioner of Police, a politician and statesman.

== Career ==
Anthony Deku was a Deputy Commissioner of Police in the Criminals Investigations Department prior to the coup d'état of 24 February 1966 which led to the overthrow of Kwame Nkrumah. He was later promoted Commissioner of Police in the same department.

== Politics ==
Deku was one of four police officers who were on the National Liberation Council. The others were J.W.K. Harlley, the Vice Chairman, B. A. Yakubu, Deputy Commissioner of Police and J.E.O. Nunoo, Commissioner of Police (Administration). The Head of the government was Lt. Gen. Ankrah. Deku is alleged to have been involved in the planning of the coup with Emmanuel Kotoka and J. W. K. Harlley.

In 2009, he became a member of the Council of State.

== Other activities ==
Anthony Deku is the Managing Director Securicor Limited in Ghana.

== Honours ==
He was awarded the Order of the Star of Ghana by the Kufuor government in 2006.
