= S. T. Nettey =

Ghanaian Civil Servant

Samuel Tettey Nettey

Minister for Labour and Social Welfare
- In office 1966–1969
- Appointed by: Joseph Arthur Ankrah
- Preceded by: Susanna Al-Hassan
- Succeeded by: Jatoe Kaleo

Personal details
- Born: 25 July 1909 Accra, Gold Coast
- Died: 21 November 2007 (aged 98)

Samuel Tettey Nettey (1909–2007) was a Ghanaian politician and Civil Servant. He served as Ghana's Commissioner (Minister) for Labour and Social Welfare from 1966 to 1969.

== Early life and education ==
Nettey was born in Accra on 25 July 1909, to captain Christopher B. Nettey (a founding member of the Accra Hearts of Oak S. C.), and madam Jane K. Tettey-Ashong. He had his early education at the Government Boys' School in Accra from 1916 to 1923. He also held an Intermediate Certificate in Accountancy, after passing the Corporation of Registered Accountants (Glasgow) entrance examination in 1931. In 1949, he was sent to London to attend a Ministry of Labour course, after which he became an associate member of the Institute of Personnel Management.

== Career and politics ==
In 1937, Nettey took up a job at the Public Works Department. Two years later, he was transferred to the Labour Department which had been established a year earlier. In 1950 he was appointed Labour Officer. He later rose through the ranks to become the Commissioner of Labour (Chief Labour Officer) in 1959. From 1960 to 1963, he was made the representative of the government of Ghana on the International Labour Organisation's governing body. Prior to his appointment as Commissioner for Labour and Social Welfare, he served in various administrative capacities in various firms. Some of which include Shell Ghana Limited, where he served as Personnel Manager. Nettey served as Commissioner (Minister) for Labour and Social Welfare from 1966 to 1969. Tettey was a member of the Ghana Association for the Advancement of Management.

== Personal life ==
Nettey loved to read, sing, and take pictures at his leisure time. His favourite sports were lawn tennis and football. He was a patron of the Accra Hearts of Oak football team. He died on Wednesday 21 November 2007 at the age of 98.
