= K.G. Osei Bonsu =

Ghanaian politician

Kwabena Gyima Osei-Bonsu

Minister of State (State Protocol)
- In office 1969 – 13 January 1972
- President: Edward Akufo-Addo
- Prime Minister: Kofi Abrefa Busia

Member of the Ghana Parliament for Asokwa
- In office 1 October 1969 – 13 January 1972
- President: Edward Akufo-Addo
- Prime Minister: Kofi Abrefa Busia
- Preceded by: Osei Owusu Afriyie
- Succeeded by: Osei Asibey

Personal details
- Born: Kwabena Gyima Osei-Bonsu; 13 September 1932 (age 94) Mampong, Ashanti Region, Gold Coast
- Education: Achimota School; Odorgonno Senior High School; University of Bradford; Leeds University

Kwabena Gyima Osei-Bonsu was a lawyer and Ghanaian Politician and a member of the first parliament of the second Republic representing the Asokwa Constituency in the Ashanti Region of Ghana. He was a minister of state in the Busia government.

== Early life and education ==
He was born on 13 September 1932 at Mampong in the Ashanti Region. He started schooling at Sunyani Government School and later at the Bechem Presbyterian School from 1939 to 1946. He entered Achimota School in 1947 and later attended the Odorgonno Secondary School where he completed his secondary education in 1951. He spent a year at the University of Bradford before attending Leeds University, England in 1957 to pursue law. He completed his studies in 1960 and was called to the bar at Lincoln's Inn in February, 1962.

== Career and politics ==
Osei-Bonsu began legal practice at Yaanom Chambers in Kumasi from March 1962 to June 1967. In 1966, he was appointed Director of the Ghana Commercial Bank. That same year, he was appointed Commissioner for the Ministry of Information on 1 July, during the tenureof the National Liberation Council (NLC). He resigned his post at the Information Ministry in January 1968. At the inception of the Second Republic he was elected the member of parliament for Asokwa and also appointed Minister of State (State Protocol), he served in these positions until 1972.

== Personal life ==
He married Justina Ackah on 16 June 1960. Together they had four children. His hobbies were football, athletics and lawn tennis.

== See also ==
- Busia government
