= Kobina Orleans Thompson =

Ghanaian politician

Member of the Ghana Parliament for Komenda-Abriem

Personal details
- Born: Elmina, Central Region
- Party: Convention People's Party

Kobina Orleans Thompson was a Ghanaian politician.

== Early life ==
Thompson hailed from Elmina in the Central Region of Ghana.

== Career ==
In July 1956, Thompson was elected in the general election to serve in the Legislative Assembly. He also served at the Union Trading Company and moved to his personal store. In 1969, he was the owner of Orbit Travel Agency.

== Politics ==
Thompson was a member of Convention People's Party (CPP). In 1954, he was elected into Parliament and was the Member of Parliament for Komenda-Abriem. He was the Minister for Mines and Mineral Resources. He was also the Minister of Lands and Mineral Resources.
