= Ebenezer Adam =

Ghanaian politician (1919–2011)

Northern Regional Commissioner
- In office 1964 – February 1966
- President: Dr. Kwame Nkrumah
- Preceded by: Mumuni Bawumia
- Succeeded by: J. M. Kporvi

Member of Parliament for Tamale
- In office 1965 – February 1966
- Succeeded by: Mohammed Ibrahim

Member of Parliament for Gulkpegu Nanton
- In office 1960–1965
- Preceded by: Alhaji Osumanu
- Succeeded by: Constituency abolished

Personal details
- Born: Stephen Allen Kodjoe Dzirasa; 1919 Tamale, Northern Region
- Died: 29 August 2011 (aged 91–92)
- Citizenship: Ghanaian
- Education: Achimota College

Ebenezer Adam (1919–2011) was a Ghanaian teacher and politician. He was a member of parliament for Gulkpegu Nanton from 1960 to 1965 and the member of parliament for Tamale from 1965 to 1966. He also served as the Regional Commissioner (Regional Minister) for the Northern Region from 1964 to 1966.

== Early life and education ==
Adam was born in 1919 at Tamale in the Northern Region of Ghana (then Gold Coast). He had his early education at the Government Boarding School in Tamale from 1927 to 1934. He proceeded to Achimota College and studied there from 1936 to 1939.

== Career and politics ==
Adam worked as a teacher in Methodist mission schools in Asokore, Bekwai, Kumasi and Tamale from 1940 to 1949. He gave up the teaching profession to venture politics and joined the Convention People's Party. In 1950 he was appointed propaganda secretary of the party for the Northern and Upper Regions. He worked in this capacity from 1950 to 1957. In 1957 he was a member of the first Ghanaian delegation to the United Nations. He was also a part of the 1959 and 1960 Ghanaian delegation to the United Nations. He became a local court magistrate in 1960 and in that same year he was elected into parliament to represent the Gulkpegu Nanton constituency. He represented the constituency in parliament from 1960 to 1965. In 1965 he became the member of parliament for Tamale. In 1964 he was appointed Regional Commissioner (Regional Minister) for the Northern Region. He served in this capacity until 1966 when the Nkrumah government was overthrown.

== Personal life ==
Adam was married with 12 children. His hobbies were reading and travelling.

== Death ==
He died on 29 August 2011 at the Tamale Teaching Hospital after a short illness.

== See also ==
- List of MPs elected in the 1965 Ghanaian parliamentary election
