= Clelend Cofie Bruce =

Ghanaian military personnel

Major General Cleland Cofie Bruce was a Ghanaian military personnel and a former Chief of Army Staff of the Ghana Army. He served as Chief of Army Staff from August 1966 to May 1967.
