= Komla Agbeli Gbedemah =

Ghanaian politician (1913–1988)

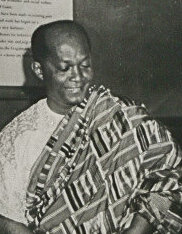
- Gbedemah in 1953

Minister for Finance
- In office 1954 – May 1961
- Succeeded by: Ferdinand Koblavi Dra Goka

Founder and leader of the National Alliance of Liberals
- In office 1969–1969

Personal details
- Born: 17 June 1913 Warri, Nigeria.
- Died: 11 July 1998 (aged 85)
- Party: Convention People's Party (1947–61); National Alliance of Liberals (1969)
- Education: Mfantsipim School, Achimota College

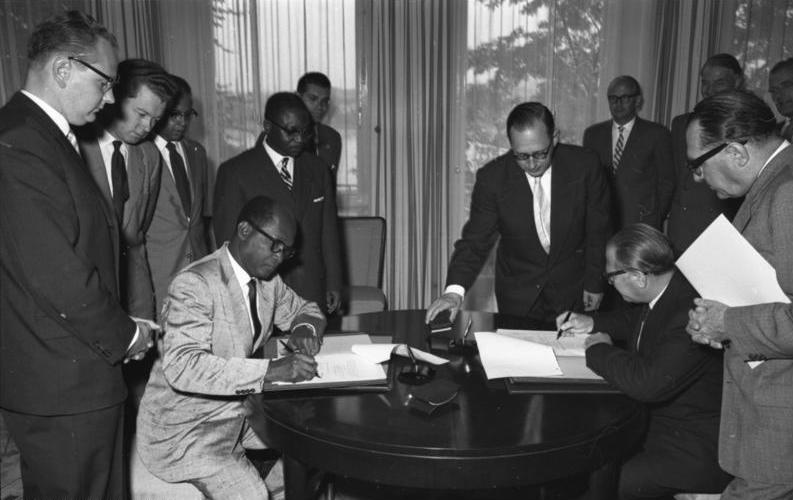
15 August 1959: Gbedemah (seated left) signs a finance agreement on behalf of Ghana with West Germany

Komla Agbeli Gbedemah (17 June 1913 – 11 July 1998) was a Ghanaian politician and Minister for Finance in Ghana's Nkrumah government between 1954 and 1961. Known popularly as "Afro Gbede", he was an indigene of Anyako in the Volta Region of Ghana.

== Early life and career ==
Komla Gbedemah was born on 17 June 1913 in Warri, Nigeria, of Ewe parentage. He attended Mfantsipim School in Cape Coast for his secondary education from 1925 to 1929 and Achimota College from 1929 to 1933. He became employed as a teacher at a school in the Akuapem District in The Gold Coast. In 1939, he became a Science Master at Accra Academy in Jamestown. Alongside teaching, he engaged in the timber and confectionery business. In 1943, he quit his teaching role at Accra Academy to engage in the timber trade full-time.

== Political career ==
Gbedemah was originally a member of the United Gold Coast Convention. He left with Dr Kwame Nkrumah to form the Convention People's Party (CPP). Gbedemah was an important member of the CPP because of his organizational ability. He was influential in getting Nkrumah elected to the Legislative council on 8 February 1951 at the Elections for the Legislative Assembly. He organized Nkrumah's entire campaign while Nkrumah was still in prison, detained by the colonial government. Nkrumah duly won the Accra Central Municipal seat. This led to Nkrumah being released on 12 February 1951 and his being invited to form a government. Gbedemah is in some reports named as being the first to welcome Nkrumah after his release from Fort James prison.

Gbedemah, who himself got elected into the Legislative Assembly, became the first Ghanaian Minister for Health and Labour in Nkrumah's government. In 1954, he became the Minister of Finance, a position he held for seven years. He was influential in getting an initially reluctant United States government to back the building of the Akosombo Dam. Later, as his relationship with Nkrumah deteriorated, Gbedemah was demoted by Nkrumah to the post of Minister of Health in May 1961. It is alleged by US sources that at a point, Gbedemah was considering the overthrow of Nkrumah. He is quoted as saying: "I would be sorry to have to do it but country has had enough of Nkrumah's arrogance, whims and madness." Nkrumah demanded Gbedemah's resignation in September 1961.

Gbedemah was forced into exile later the same year, after worsening relations between him and Nkrumah over what he perceived to be Nkrumah's financial indiscipline. He is alleged to have fled as there were plans to place him under preventive detention. While in exile, he is known to have continued to lobby the US over the Akosombo Dam project.

In 1966, the military staged a coup d'état which ousted Nkrumah and his government, following which Gbedemah was allowed to return to the country. Gbedemah formed and led the National Alliance of Liberals (NAL) into the 1969 general election. The NAL was seen as the successor of the CPP's right wing, which Gbedemah had headed until he was ousted by Nkrumah in 1961. His campaign slogan "Say it loud, I am black and proud!" was taken from the popular James Brown tune. After the election, which saw a victory for Gbedemah's rivals, the Progress Party (PP), headed by Kofi A. Busia, Gbedemah was barred from taking his seat in parliament. This followed a Supreme Court ruling, upholding the NLC barring members of the CPP accused of financial crimes from holding public office for ten years. This decision led him to retire from active involvement in politics.

From 1957 to 1961, Gbedemah served as President of the World Federalist Movement, an international non-governmental organization promoting federal world government. He was one of the signatories of the agreement to convene a convention for drafting a world constitution. As a result, for the first time in human history, a World Constituent Assembly convened to draft and adopt the Constitution for the Federation of Earth.

== Howard Johnson's restaurant incident ==
In the United States, Gbedemah is most widely known from an incident on 10 October 1957 when U.S. President Dwight D. Eisenhower apologized to him after he was refused service in a Howard Johnson's restaurant in Dover, Delaware. Gbedemah told the staff: "The people here are of a lower social status than I am, but they can drink here and we can't. You can keep the orange juice and the change, but this is not the last you have heard of this." The incident resulted in Gbedemah being invited to breakfast at the White House.

== Positions ==
For ministerial positions, see succession box.

- Leader, People's Movement for Freedom and Justice (1991 – ?)
- Founder and leader, National Alliance of Liberals (1969)
- Member, Legislative Assembly, Ghana (1951 – ?)
- Manager and editor, Accra Evening News (1949 – ?)
- Vice chairman, Convention People's Party (1949 – ?)

Political offices
Preceded by ?	Minister for Health and Labour (Gold Coast); 1951	Succeeded by ?
Preceded by ?	Minister for Commerce and Industry (Gold Coast); 1952 – 54	Succeeded by ?
Preceded by ?	Minister for Finance (Gold Coast then Ghana since 1957); 1954 – 61	Succeeded by Ferdinand Koblavi Dra Goka
Preceded by ?	Minister for Health; 1961	Succeeded by ?
Party political offices
New title	Founder and Leader; National Alliance of Liberals; 1969	Succeeded by ?

== Works ==
- Gbedemah, K. A. It will not be "work and happiness for all"; an open letter being also an appeal to Dr. Kwame Nkrumah and comment on and criticism of the proposed new 7-year Ghana development plan. [n.p.], 1962. [32p].
