= John Willie Kofi Harlley =

Deputy chairman of the National Liberation Council

Vice Chairman of the National Liberation Council
- In office 24 February 1966 – 1969
- Preceded by: Position created
- Succeeded by: Position dissolved

1st Inspector General of Police of the Ghana Police Service
- In office 1966–1969
- Preceded by: Himself as Commissioner of Police
- Succeeded by: B. A. Yakubu

Minister of Interior
- In office 1968 – August 1969
- Preceded by: Anthony Deku
- Succeeded by: Simon Diedong Dombo

Minister for Foreign Affairs
- In office 1967–1968
- Preceded by: Joseph Arthur Ankrah
- Succeeded by: Patrick Dankwa Anin

Commissioner of Police
- In office 1964–1966
- Preceded by: E. R. T. Madjitey
- Succeeded by: Himself as Inspector General of Police

Personal details
- Born: 9 May 1919 Akagla, British Togoland
- Died: 18 February 1982 (aged 62) Anyako, Volta Region
- Spouse: Nancy Harlley (née Woanyah)
- Education: Accra Academy

John Willie Kofi Harlley (9 May 1919 – 18 February 1982) was a Ghanaian police officer who was Vice Chairman of the National Liberation Council and the first Inspector General of Police in Ghana from 1966 to 1969. He was a member of the three-man presidential commission which carried out presidential functions during the 1969 democratic transition in Ghana and in the first year of the Second Republic.

== Early years and education ==
He was born at Akagla in the Volta Region which was then British Togoland under British jurisdiction following the World War I. He attended Presbyterian Schools at Boso and Akropong. He completed his elementary school education at Anloga Presbyterian School in 1936 and later enrolled into the Accra Academy where he had his secondary education from 1936 to 1939.

== Pre-NLC career ==
He was an interpreter in Ewe and Twi at the district magistrate court, Accra. Then later at the Supreme Court of Ghana, before enlisting in the Gold Coast Police just a week before his 21st birthday in May 1940. He became an inspector in November 1952 and was selected for training at the Metropolitan Police College, Hendon (now Hendon Police College) in 1953. On his return to Ghana he progressed from the rank of assistant Superintendent of Police to become the commissioner of police in 1965.

== NLC government ==
At the time of the February 24, 1966 coup d'état that removed the Convention People's Party government of Dr. Kwame Nkrumah, Harlley was the Commissioner of Police, making him the most senior police officer in the country. He was one of the eight members of the National Liberation Council government formed afterward and made vice chairman.

He remained in his office as the head of the police force in the new designation as Inspector-General of Police and in addition, assumed ministerial responsibility for the interior between 1966 and 1969 and foreign affairs between 1967 and 1968.

On 3 September 1969, a presidential commission was formed which carried out presidential functions during the 1969 democratic transitional process in Ghana. Harlley was a member of the three-man commission whose other members were Lt. General Akwasi Afrifa and Lt. General Albert Kwesi Ocran. This commission remained in place even after the handover to the democratically elected Progress Party government of Kofi Abrefa Busia. On August 7, 1970, the commission was replaced by an interim President, Nii Amaa Ollennu.

== Honours ==
- In 1970, he received an LL.D from the University of Ghana.

== Personal life and death ==
Harlley was married to Nancy Harlley (née Woanyah). Following his service in government, Harlley spent the rest of his life in his hometown Anyako in the Volta Region. He died on 18 February 1982 in Anyako where he was buried.

Police appointments
Preceded by E.R.T. Madjitey	Inspector General of Police; 1965 – 1969	Succeeded by B. A. Yakubu
Political offices
Preceded by Lawrence Rosario Abavana	Minister for the Interior; 1966 – 1969	Succeeded by Simon Diedong Dombo
Preceded by Lt. Gen. Joseph A. Ankrah	Foreign Minister; 1967 – 1968	Succeeded by Patrick Dankwa Anin
