= Ministry of Defence (Ghana) =

Government ministry of Ghana

Agency overview
- Formed: 1957
- Jurisdiction: Government of Ghana
- Headquarters: Accra, Ghana
- Minister responsible: Cassiel Ato Forson (acting)

Ministry of Defence (MoD) of the government of Ghana, is the governmental department responsible for defending the Republic of Ghana from internal and external military threats and promotion of Ghanaian national defence interests. The MoD political head is the Defence Minister of Ghana, and its main office is located in Accra, Greater Accra., with other regional offices nationwide.

Ministry of Defence (Ghana), is the governmental department responsible for all actions, related to defence of the Republic of Ghana, from internal or external military threats. The MoD political head is the Defence Minister of Ghana, and its offices are located in the Ministry of Defence, near Burma Camp and Kotoka International Airport (Accra).

The ministry of defence oversees the formulation and implementation of policies related to natural security and defence. It ensures that the Ghana Armed Forces is equipped adequately, trained, and organized to perform their constitutional duties.

In October 2025, security expert, Professor Kwesi Aning alleged that about 40,000 rounds of ammunition went missing from the Ministry of Defence's armoury shortly before the handing over ceremony on January 7, 2025.

== See also ==
- Ghana Armed Forces
- Minister for Defence (Ghana)
