= Ministry of Works and Housing (Ghana) =

Government ministry of Ghana

Ministry of Works and Housing (MWH)

Agency overview
- Jurisdiction: Republic of Ghana
- Headquarters: Ghana
- Minister responsible: Kenneth Gilbert Adjei
- Website: www.mwrwh.gov.gh

The Ministry of Works and Housing (MWH) is tasked with the conceptualization and classification of policies and programs for the systematic growth of the country's infrastructure. The offices of the Ministry are located in Accra.

== Core functions ==
The functions of the Ministry are to pioneer and develop policies to meet the needs and expectations of the people in the country. The Ministry works collaboratively with the National Development Planning Commission to serve as a check on the performance of the sector. As part of its functions, the Ministry provides assistance in the form of training and research works in productions and endorse the use of local building materials.

== Departments and agencies ==
These are the departments and agencies that work collaboratively with the Ministry:

Works Sector Agencies:

- Hydro-logical Services Department (HSD)
- Public Works Department (PWD)
- Architectural and Engineering Services Limited (AESL)
- Engineers Council

Housing Sector Agencies:

- Rent Control Department (RCD)
- Department of Rural Housing (DRH)
- Public Servants’ Housing Loans Scheme Board (PSHLSB)
- Architects Registration Council (ARC)
- Tema Development Corporation (TDC)
- State Housing Company (SHC)

== See also ==
- Water supply and sanitation in Ghana
