= Joseph Arthur Ankrah =

Head of State of Ghana from 1966 to 1969

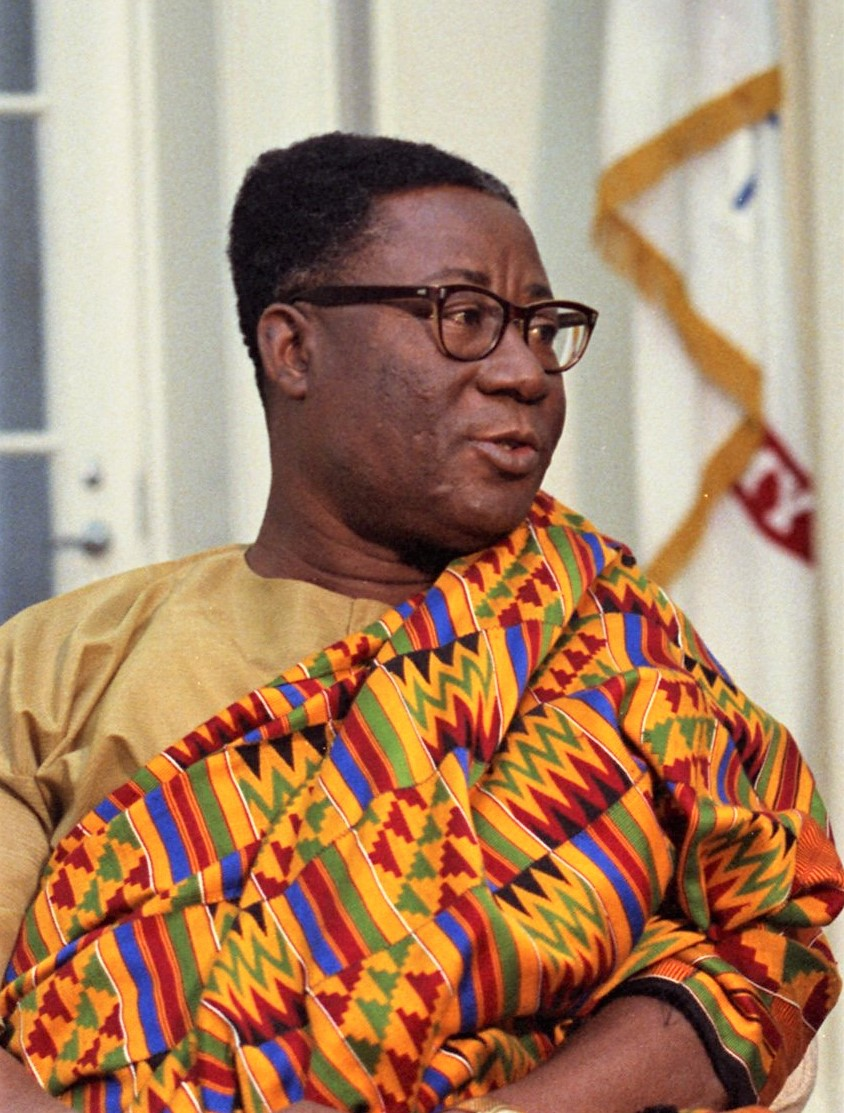
- Ankrah in 1967

2nd Head of State of Ghana
- In office 24 February 1966 – 2 April 1969
- Deputy: John Willie Kofi Harlley
- Preceded by: Kwame Nkrumah (as President)
- Succeeded by: Akwasi Afrifa

1st Chairman of the National Liberation Council
- In office 24 February 1966 – 2 April 1969
- Deputy: John Willie Kofi Harlley
- Preceded by: Position established
- Succeeded by: Akwasi Afrifa

4th Chairperson of the Organisation of African Unity
- In office 24 February 1966 – 5 November 1966
- Preceded by: Kwame Nkrumah
- Succeeded by: Haile Selassie

Personal details
- Born: 18 August 1915 Accra, then part of the Colony of the Gold Coast
- Died: 25 November 1992 (aged 77) Accra, Ghana
- Party: None (Military)
- Spouse: Mildred Christina Akosiwor Fugar (d. 2005)
- Profession: Soldier

Military service
- Branch/service: Ghana Army
- Years of service: 1939–1969
- Rank: Lieutenant General
- Commands: Chief of the Defence Staff
- Awards: Military cross
- Appointed after coup d'état of 24 February 1966

Joseph Arthur Ankrah (18 August 1915 – 25 November 1992) was a Ghanaian army general who was the second head of state of Ghana from 1966 to 1969 as chairman of the National Liberation Council. He was Ghana's first military head of state. Ankrah also served as the fourth chairperson of the Organisation of African Unity from 24 February 1966 to 5 November 1966. Previously, Ankrah was appointed the first commander of the Ghana Army in 1961.

== Early life ==
Joseph Arthur Ankrah was born on 18 August 1915 in Accra to the Ga family of Samuel Paul Cofie Ankrah, an overseer for the Christian Missionary Society and Beatrice Abashie Quaynor, a trader.

Ankrah began school in 1921 at the Wesleyan Methodist School in Accra, where he was nicknamed 'Ankrah Patapaa' for his "forcefulness in arguments and always playing leadership role among his mates". In 1932, he entered Accra Academy, where he established himself as a good football player. He obtained the Senior Cambridge School Certificate in 1937. He then joined the Ghana Civil Service.

== Military career ==
Ankrah joined the Gold Coast Regiment in 1939. On the outbreak of World War II, Ankrah was mobilized into the Royal West African Frontier Force. While his Brigade was in East Africa in 1940, he was transferred to the Record Office in Accra with the rank of Warrant Officer Class II and made second-in-command. In October 1946, he went to the Marshfield Officer Cadets Training Unit in the United Kingdom and graduated in February 1947 as the first African officer in the Gold Coast Army. He was commissioned a lieutenant in 1947 and became the first African camp commandant at the Army Headquarters. He was later made the first Ghanaian Chief Instructor of the Education Unit. He was promoted Major in 1956 and became the first African to command an all-African company, the Charlie Company of the First Battalion at Tamale, Ghana. He later became Lieutenant Colonel and took over the whole battalion. He rose to the rank of colonel by 1960, at a time when there were few Ghanaian officers at that level. During the United Nations Operation in the Congo, he was the Brigade Commander of the force-based at Luluabourg, Kasai in the present-day Democratic Republic of Congo. He was the only Ghanaian awarded the Military Cross in Leopoldville for acts of unsurpassed gallantry in Congo in 1961. The citation read:

With great common sense, maturity and tact, this officer handled a delicate situation which otherwise would have created grave consequences in Leopoldville and many parts of the Congo. Colonel Ankrah, with complete disregard for his own life, disarmed an Armée Nationale Congolaise (ANC) soldier who, with a loaded sten machine carbine, attempted to shoot Mr. Lumumba. He carried the Prime Minister to safety in a vehicle which was fired on by ANC ambushers. Had it not been for the quick and bold action of Colonel Ankrah at the risk of his life, Mr. Lumumba's life would have been taken with untold consequences at that time.

After his experience in the Congo, he was promoted to Brigadier. In 1961 when President Nkrumah dismissed Major-General Alexander, Ghanaian officers had to take over. Ankrah was promoted to command the Ghana Army becoming the first Ghanaian commander of the Ghana army in 1961. He later became deputy to Major-General S.J.A. Otu, the Chief of Defence Staff. Ankrah was dismissed from the Ghana army in July 1965 on suspicion of involvement in a coup plot.

== Politics ==
Following the leakage of information suggesting their involvement in a potential coup plot, Lieutenant-General Joseph Arthur Ankrah and Major General S.J.A. Otu were dismissed from the Ghana Army in July 1965 on suspicion of conspiracy against President Kwame Nkrumah. Ankrah subsequently entered the financial sector and was appointed Director of the National Investment Bank.

After the 24 February 1966 coup d'état that overthrew Nkrumah, the coup leaders Emmanuel Kwasi Kotoka and Akwasi Afrifa invited Ankrah to serve as Chairman of the National Liberation Council (NLC) and Head of State of Ghana. Ankrah was Ghana's first military head of state, holding office from 24 February 1966 until his resignation in April 1969 amid a bribery scandal involving a Nigerian businessman, Arthur Nzeribe.

In January 1967, he mediated between the warring factions of the Nigerian Civil War in Biafra. He was forced to resign as Chairman of the NLC and Head of State over a bribery scandal involving a Nigerian businessman.

== Sports ==
Ankrah served as the first ever President of the Council of Patrons of Accra Hearts of Oak S.C. and steered the football club for a long period.

== Family ==
In 1965 he married his third wife, Mildred Christina Akosiwor Fugar (12 June 1938 – 9 June 2005), in Accra. His son also went to Accra Academy. He had a daughter called Jackie Ankrah who is a broadcaster, songwriter and musician. He had several wives and 18 children.

== See also ==
- National Liberation Council

Political offices
| Preceded by Kwame Nkrumah | Head of state of Ghana; Military regime 1966–1969 | Succeeded by Akwasi Afrifa |
| Preceded by Alex Quaison-Sackey | Foreign Minister; 1966–1967 | Succeeded by John Willie Kofi Harlley |
| Preceded by Lt. Gen. E. K. Kotoka | Minister for Defence; 1967 – 1969 | Succeeded by Maj. Gen. A. K. Ocran |
| Preceded by Kwame Nkrumah | Chairperson of the Organization of African Unity; 1966 | Succeeded by Haile Selassie |
Military offices
| Preceded by Henry Templer Alexander | Chief of Army Staff; 1961 – 1962 | Succeeded by Major General S. J. A. Otu |
| Preceded by Lt. Gen. E. K. Kotoka | Chief of the Defence Staff; 1967 - 1968 | Succeeded by Air Marshall Michael A. Otu |
