= Chief of Air Staff (Ghana) =

Air force Ghana head

Chief of the Air Staff
- Air Force Ensign of Ghana
- Incumbent; Air Vice Marshal Eric Agyen-Frempong since 24 March 2025
- Ghana Air Force
- Abbreviation: CAS
- Reports to: Chief of the Defence Staff
- Appointer: President of Ghana
- Formation: 1959
- First holder: K. Jaswant-Singh

Chief of Air Staff is the official title of the highest ranking air force personnel of the Ghana Air Force. The current Chief of Air Staff is Air Vice Marshal Eric Agyen-Frempong.

== Chiefs of Air Staff ==
The senior appointment in the GHF is the Chief of Air Staff. The following is a list of the Ghana Air Force Chiefs of Air Staff:

No.	Portrait	Name (born–died)	Term of office			Ref.
No.	Portrait	Name (born–died)	Took office	Left office	Time in office	Ref.
1	K. Jaswant-Singh	Air Commodore; K. Jaswant-Singh; Indian	May 1959	August 1960	1 year, 3 months	
2	I. M. Gundry-White	Wing Commander; I. M. Gundry-White (1918–1961); British	September 1960	March 1961	6 months	
3	John N. H. Whitworth	Air Commodore; John N. H. Whitworth (1912–1974); British	March 1961	September 1962	1 year, 6 months	
4	J.E.S. de Graft-Hayford	Air Commodore; J.E.S. de Graft-Hayford (1912–2002); First Ghanaian CAS	September 1962	July 1963	10 months	
5	Michael Otu	Air Vice-Marshal; Michael Otu (1925–2006)	July 1963	March 1968	4 years, 8 months	
6	Napoleon Ashley-Lassen	Air Commodore; Napoleon Ashley-Lassen (born 1934)	March 1968	January 1971	2 years, 10 months	
7	Charles Beausoliel	Air Commodore; Charles Beausoliel	January 1971	December 1971	11 months	
(6)	Napoleon Ashley-Lassen	Air Commodore; Napoleon Ashley-Lassen	December 1971	January 1972	1 month	
(7)	Charles Beausoliel	Air Commodore; Charles Beausoliel	December 1972	November 1976	4 years, 11 months	
8	George Yaw Boakye	Air Vice Marshal; George Yaw Boakye (1937–1979)	November 1976	June 1979	2 years, 7 months	
9	Samuel Gyabaah	Wing Commander; Samuel Gyabaah	June 1979	July 1979	1 month	
10	F. W. K. Klutse	Group Captain; F. W. K. Klutse	July 1979	December 1979	4 months	
11	John Odaate-Barnor	Air Commodore; John Odaate-Barnor (1937–2012)	December 1979	May 1980	5 months	
12	K. K. Pumpuni	Air Commodore; K. K. Pumpuni	May 1980	January 1982	1 year, 8 months	
13	E. A. A. Awuviri	Group Captain; E. A. A. Awuviri	January 1982	December 1982	11 months	
14	J. E. A. Kotei	Air Vice Marshal; J. E. A. Kotei (1940–2010)	December 1982	June 1988	5 years, 6 months	
15	Harry Dumashie	Air Marshal; Harry Dumashie (1938–2002)	June 1988	June 1992	4 years	
16	John Asamoah Bruce	Air Marshal; John Asamoah Bruce (1938–2002)	5 June 1992	16 March 2001	8 years, 9 months	
17	Edward Mantey	Air Vice Marshal; Edward Mantey (born 1946)	16 March 2001	20 May 2005	4 years, 2 months	
18	Julius Boateng	Air Vice Marshal; Julius Boateng	20 May 2005	28 January 2009	3 years, 8 months	
19	Michael Samson-Oje	Air Vice Marshal; Michael Samson-Oje (born 1954)	31 March 2009	January 2016	6 years, 9 months	
20	Maxwell Nagai	Air Vice Marshal; Maxwell Nagai	January 2016	January 2019	3 years	
21	Frank Hanson	Air Vice Marshal; Frank Hanson	January 2019	January 2023	4 years	
22	Frederick Asare Bekoe	Air Marshal; Frederick Asare Bekoe	26 January 2023	24 March 2025	2 years, 1 month	
23	Eric Agyen-Frempong	Air Vice Marshal; Eric Agyen-Frempong	24 March 2025	Incumbent	1 year, 7 months	
