= Edward Mantey =

Edward Apau Mantey
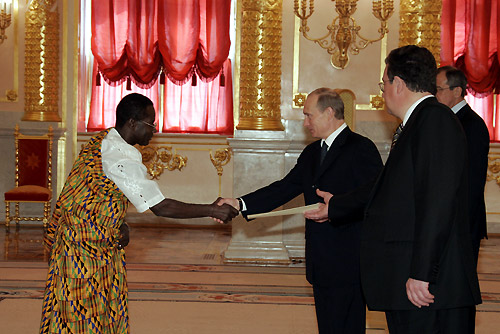
- Vladimir Putin receives letter of Credentials from Edward Mantey in the Kremlin.

Chief of Ghana Air Force Staff
- In office March 16, 2001 – May 20, 2005
- Preceded by: Harry Dumashie; John Asamoah Bruce
- Succeeded by: Julius Otchere Boateng

Ghanaian ambassador to Russia
- In office April 13, 2006 – December 16, 2009
- Preceded by: es:Fracis Yahaya Mahama
- Succeeded by: Seth Koranteng

Personal details
- Born: May 10, 1946 (age 79) Apirede, Eastern Region, Ghana

Edward Apau Mantey is a retired Ghanaian Vice-Air marshal Ghana Air Force and diplomat.

== Background ==
Mantey was born on May 10, 1946. From April 13, 2006 to December 16, 2009 he was Ambassador Extraordinary and Plenipotentiary of the Republic of Ghana to the Russian Federation. With residence in Moscow he was in late 2006 appointed as the Ghanaian ambassador to Turkmenistan. He has four children with his wife of 50 years, Esi (Forson) Mantey, and taught them of how important it was to work hard and why it is imperative to have faith.

== Career ==
He graduated from St. Mary's High School and later served as the Vice Marshal in the Ghana Air Force. Edward Mantey offered to help the United States in its war against terrorism in February 2005, stating that the Air Force should “open our arms and give America the assistance that we can give”. He was known as a very dependable leader by his peers, and administered a successful air force. Ambassador Mantey had many commendable accomplishments in a matter of months. He called on both African and Western Ambassadors, in addition to attending official ceremonies and representing his country. In his career as Air Vice-Marshal, Mantey won over appreciation by his colleagues for his valuable and meaningful diplomatic duties compared to his bureaucratic predecessor.

At age 58, Mantey had been shown nearly everything that was crucial for him to know of the Air Force mission in England. He was aboard a C-130 that belonged to the 352nd Special Operations Group when it was refueled by a KC-135, from the 100th Air Refueling Wing. In addition to his journey to England, Edward A. Mantey traveled to Ramstein as a guest of 3rd Air Force and was involved in the European Command's Theater Security Cooperation plan which aimed to motivates visits from the leaders in foreign air forces in order to build stronger military-to-military relationships. When Mantey was first sworn in as an ambassador, he swore to ensure that he would reflect Ghana and not political, ethnic or religious interests. His appointment caused much confusion among the Group of African Ambassadors in Moscow. An official letter was circulated by the Embassy of the Republic of Ghana publicizing Edward Mantey's arrival, only to announce later that his appearance had been hindered.

Military offices
Preceded by J A Bruce	Chief of Air Staff (GAF); 2001 – 2005	Succeeded by J O Boateng
