= John Odaate-Barnor =

John Odaate - Barnor
- Born: May 30, 1937
- Died: 31 August 2012 (aged 75)
- Military career
- Allegiance: Ghana
- Branch: Ghana Air Force
- Service years: 1961–1982
- Rank: Air Vice Marshal
- Commands: Chief of Defence Staff; Chief of Air Force; Commandant of the Armed Forces Staff College
- Other work: Ambassador to Italy, Malta and Turkey

Air Vice Marshal John E. Odaate-Barnor (30 May 1937 – 31 August 2012) was a Ghanaian airman and diplomat. He was a former Chief of Defence Staff of the Ghana Armed Forces. He served in this capacity from 7 December 1979 till 31 December 1981.

== Early life and education ==
Odaate-Barnor was born in Accra, the capital city of Ghana. His primary education was at the Presbyterian Primary School, Mpraeso. He proceeded to the Presbyterian Middle School at Abetifi, which he completed in 1951. His secondary education was at the Abuakwa State College at Kibi in the Eastern Region of Ghana. He graduated in 1955.

== Army career ==
He was one of the first to enlist in the Air Force Cadet in July 1959 and completed his training with the Royal Air Force in August 1961 in the United Kingdom. He was commissioned on 20 January 1961. After his return to Ghana from Canada, where he had further training, he was based at the Air Force Base at Takoradi in the Western Region. He became garrison commander in 1972. After his diplomatic service, he was appointed commandant of the Armed Forces Staff College in 1977, the second person to hold this position. He became the Air Force Commander in May 1979. He was appointed Chief of the Defence Staff in May 1980 by the Limann government.

== Diplomatic service ==
He served as Ghana's ambassador to Italy, Turkey and Malta between 1972 and 1977 until he was recalled to Ghana during the era of the National Redemption Council military government.

== Other activities ==
John Odaate – Barnor also served as a member of the Council of the University of Ghana and as Chairman of the Board of Directors of the Tema Development Corporation between 1977 and March 1981. He has also served as the Chairman of the Veterans Association of Ghana.

Military offices
Preceded by Group Captain F. W. K. Klutse	Chief of Air Staff; 1979 — 1980	Succeeded by Air Commodore K. K. Pumpuni
Preceded by Major General Edwin Kwamina Sam	Chief of Defence Staff; 1980 — 1982	Succeeded by Brigadier Joseph Nunoo-Mensah
Diplomatic posts
Preceded by ?	Ambassador to Italy; 1972 – 1977	Succeeded by ?
Preceded by ?	Ambassador to Turkey; 1972 – 1977	Succeeded by ?
Preceded by ?	Ambassador to Malta; 1972 – 1977	Succeeded by ?
