= Neville Alexander Odartey-Wellington =

Ghanaian army officer (1934–1979)

Major-General Neville Alexander Odartey-Wellington
- Born: 1934
- Died: 1979 (aged 44–45)
- Alma mater: Accra Academy
- Spouse: Comfort
- Children: 5
- Military career
- Allegiance: Ghana
- Branch: Ghana Army
- Rank: Chief of Army Staff
- Conflicts: Congo Crisis

Major General Neville Alexander Odartey-Wellington (1934–1979) was a Ghanaian army officer who was Chief of Army Staff of the Ghana Army from 1978 to 1979. He died in action leading loyal troops against revolting forces during the 4 June 1979 military uprising in Ghana which toppled the Supreme Military Council II government led by Fred Akuffo.

== Military career ==
Neville Odartey-Wellington attended Accra Academy in Ghana and various military training institutions including the Royal Military Academy Sandhurst (RMAS), and the United States Army Infantry School (Fort Benning, Georgia). After being commissioned as an officer, he saw action in the Congo during the Congo Crisis, and also served in the Ghanaian UNIFIL contingent in the Middle East.

Described as a “soldier’s soldier”, Odartey-Wellington served in military command and civil administrative positions under the National Redemption Council (NRC) and Supreme Military Council I (SMC I) governments led by I. K. Acheampong. He was Chief Executive of the Ghana Timber Marketing Board, Commissioner (Minister) of Health, and subsequently Commissioner of Agriculture tasked with implementing Acheampong's nationalistic "Operation Feed Yourself" program, before reverting to the position of Commander, No. 1 Infantry Brigade Group in 1977. He is believed to have led the palace coup that removed General Acheampong as Head of State in July 1978.

In the reconstituted SMC regime or SMC II led by General F.W.K. Akuffo, Odartey-Wellington was promoted from brigadier to major general, and became Army Commander or Chief of Army Staff and thus, a member of the SMC's cabinet . In his capacity as a cabinet member, Odartey-Wellington led the Ghanaian delegation to the General Debate of the thirty-third session of the UN General Assembly in October 1978, where, apart from delivering a blistering attack on the Ian Smith regime in what was then Rhodesia, as well as South Africa's apartheid policy and its occupation of Namibia, he reaffirmed Ghana's commitment to Palestinian self-determination, including the option to establish an independent State.

== Death ==
The SMC II commenced the transition to multi-party democratic rule, but was itself overthrown in a bloody coup on June 4, 1979, during which Major General Odartey-Wellington was killed while leading loyal troops. Although the coup was successful, he was buried with full military honours by the new regime at the Ghana Military Cemetery in Osu. Major General Odartey-Wellington had previously foiled another coup on 15 May 1979. As Chief of Army Staff, Odartey-Wellington's death, coupled with the capitulation of Chief of Defence Staff Lieutenant General Joshua Hamidu, compromised the ability of the SMCII to resist the June 4th revolt. His colleagues subsequently surrendered and most of them were executed without due process by the new regime. Ghana's National Reconciliation Commission has highly commended Odartey-Wellington for his sense of duty and “daring leadership” in trying to quell the revolt so as to safeguard the transition process. In September 1995, the Ghana Army commissioned the multi-million cedi Odartey-Wellington Tennis Court at the Army Officers' Mess in Accra in honour of the late Army Commander, who had been an avid tennis player.

== Private life ==
Major General Odartey-Wellington was survived by his wife Comfort and five children: Comfort, Esther, Dorothy, Michael, and Felix. Mrs Comfort Odartey-Wellington died in 1997 and was buried next to her husband at the Military Cemetery in Osu. Odartey-Wellington's children have since been involved in high-profile clashes in the press with Jerry Rawlings, the airman who led the 4 June 1979 coup that resulted in the killing of the former Army Commander. One such clash culminated in the detention of Felix Odartey-Wellington by Ghana's Bureau of National Investigations(BNI) in 2000 after he had described Rawlings as a "political conman" on national television.

Military offices
Preceded by Major General Kotei	Chief of Army Staff; 1978 – 1979	Succeeded by Major General Nunoo-Mensah
Political offices
Preceded by Lt Col H. Selormey	Commissioner for Health ? – ?	Succeeded by ?
Preceded by Lt Col Paul Nkegbe	Commissioner for Agriculture; 1979	Succeeded by Colonel Samuel Akwagiram
