= Winston Mensa-Wood =

Winston M. Mensa-Wood
- Born: 10 November 1940; Cape Coast
- Died: 21 March 1992 (aged 51); London
- Burial place: Osu Military Cemetery, Accra
- Military career
- Allegiance: Ghana
- Branch: Ghana Army
- Rank: Lieutenant General
- Commands: Chief of the Defence Staff; Chief of Army Staff

Lieutenant General Winston Mensa-Wood was a former Ghanaian military officer and served as the twenty-third Chief of Defence Staff of the Ghana Armed Forces from June 1990 to March 1992. He took over from Lieutenant General Arnold Quainoo but died in office. He was replaced by Air Marshal Achilles Harry Kwami Dumashie. Prior to that, he was Chief of Army Staff from 1987 to 1990.

== Early life and education ==
Mensa-Wood was born at Cape Coast in the then Gold Coast, now Ghana. His secondary education was at the Ghana National College where he completed his West African Schools Certificate Examination in 1961.

== Career ==
He enlisted in the Ghana Army in 1961. After returning from the V. I. Lenin Military-Political Academy in October 1962, he was commissioned as a Second Lieutenant. He entered the Ghana Military Academy in 1963, passing out on 30 March 1964 as full lieutenant. He attended a Royal Engineers officers course at Chatham-Kent in the United Kingdom. He was commissioned Captain in March 1967 and the officer commanding the Number Two Squadron Field Engineers Regiment. He was promoted to major in 1972. He also studied advanced engineering in Virginia, United States. He became a lieutenant colonel in July 1977. In 1982, as colonel, he was appointed the director-general (Logistics) at the Ministry of Defence. He later became commander of the Headquarters Support Services Brigade. He attained the rank of major general prior to becoming the commandant of the Military Academy and Training School at Teshie, Accra.

Mensa Wood was a colonel at the time he was tasked by the Provisional National Defence Council (PNDC) to head the Cocoa Evacuation Task Force in January 1982. This was created after the overthrow of the Limann government because mismanagement had led to a large part of the 1981-1982 crop was trapped in the interior of the country as a result of bad roads and lack of vehicles.

== Role in government ==
In June 1987, he was appointed army commander and also a member of the PNDC, the ruling military government in Ghana. In 1990, he became the general officer commanding the Ghana Armed Forces. He was promoted lieutenant general three months before his death.

== Death ==
Mensa-Wood died at the Cromwell Hospital in London from pancreatic cancer. He was survived by his wife and five children.

Military offices
Preceded by Lieutenant General Arnold Quainoo	Chief of Defence Staff; 1990 – 1992	Succeeded by Air Marshal Achilles Harry Kwami Dumashie
Preceded by Major General Arnold Quainoo	Chief of Army Staff; 1987 – 1990	Succeeded by Brigadier General Ben K. Akafia
