= John Whitworth (RAF officer) =

Air Commodore John Whitworth CB DSO DFC*
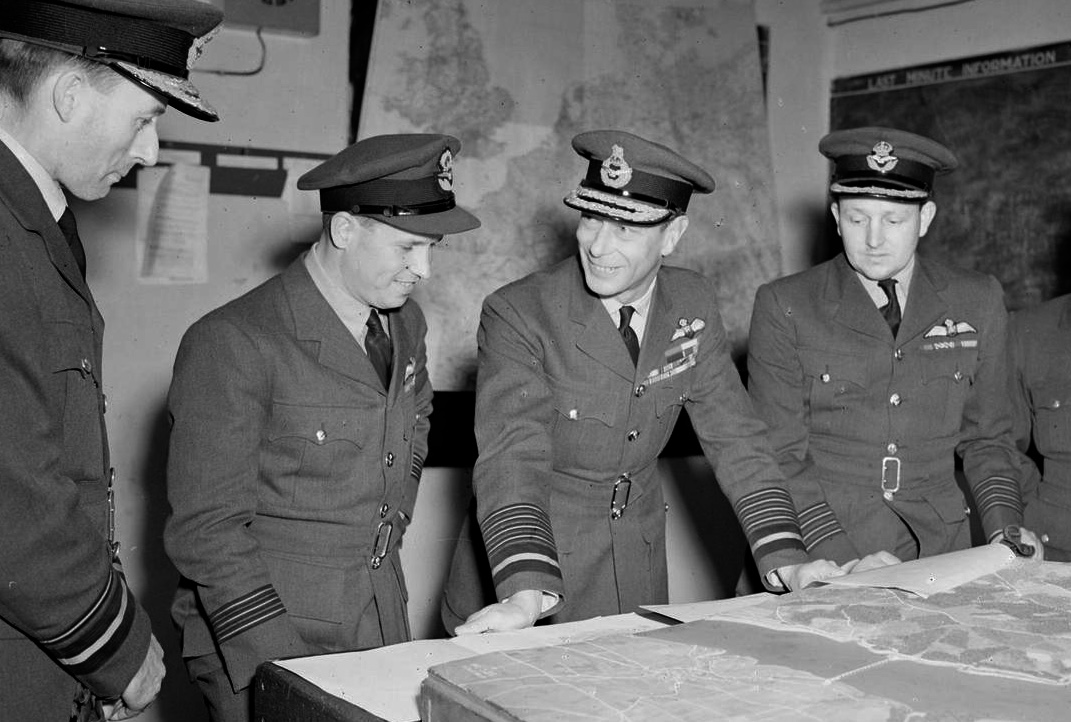
- Air Vice Marshal Ralph Cochrane, Wing Commander Guy Gibson, King George VI and Group Captain Whitworth (shown on the right) discussing the 'Dambusters Raid' in May 1943
- Born: 10 January 1912; Buenos Aires, Argentina
- Died: 13 November 1974 (aged 62); Cirencester, England
- Military career
- Allegiance: United Kingdom
- Branch: Royal Air Force
- Service years: 1930–1964
- Rank: Air Commodore
- Commands: RAF Hong Kong (1962–64); Chief of Air Staff Ghana (1961–62); Central Flying School (1958–61); RAF Swinderby (c. 1951–53); RAF Scampton (1942–43); No. 35 Squadron RAF (1942); No. 78 Squadron RAF (1940–41)
- Conflicts: Second World War
- Awards: Companion of the Order of the Bath; Distinguished Service Order; Distinguished Flying Cross & Bar; Mentioned in dispatches

Air Commodore John Nicholas Haworth Whitworth, CB, DSO, DFC* (10 January 1912 – 13 November 1974) was a Royal Air Force pilot in the 1930s and a commander during and after the Second World War. He was educated at Oundle School in Northamptonshire.

Whitworth was station commander of RAF Scampton during the planning of Operation Chastise; in 1955 he was a technical advisor for the film dramatisation of the raid, The Dam Busters. Whitworth was portrayed by Derek Farr in the film.

Whitworth was later the Chief of Staff of the Ghana Air Force; he was succeeded by the Ghanaian J. E. S. de Graft-Hayford in 1962.

He retired to the village of Rodmarton in Gloucestershire with his wife.

Military offices
Preceded by Ian Gundry-White	Chief of Staff Ghana Air Force; 1961–1962	Succeeded by J. E. S. de Graft-Hayford
