= J. E. S. de Graft-Hayford =

Chief of Staff of the Ghanaian Air Force (1912–2002)

John Ebenezer Samuel de Graft-Hayford
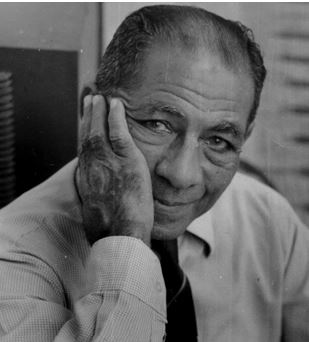
- Hayford during his tenure as Chief Air Staff, Undated photograph
- Born: 1912; United Kingdom
- Died: 2002 (aged 89–90); London, U.K.
- Military career
- Allegiance: Ghana
- Branch: Ghana Air Force
- Rank: Chief of Air Staff
- Nicknames: Chocolate Kid, Johnnie
- Service number: 3rd and 6th Battalion Coast Gold Regiment
- Units: Battalion, Regiment

John Ebenezer Samuel de Graft-Hayford (1912–2002) was the first Ghanaian to serve as Chief of Air Staff in Ghana. He was also the first indigenous Air Force Commander in Sub-Saharan Africa and briefly served as acting Chief of Defence Staff (CDS) in 1962.

He was of Ghanaian, Dutch, and German descent and was born in the United Kingdom in 1912.

== Education ==
De Graft-Hayford returned to Ghana with his parents and younger sister Mary Ruth Ernestina Edmondson (née Hayford) in 1914. He began his formal education in 1916 at the Baptist School in Accra. Between 1916 and 1922, he studied at a Pedagogium in Godesberg, Germany. From 1925 to 1928, he attended Bellahouston Academy and Ibrox Public School in Glasgow, Scotland, before enrolling in the Baptist Collegiate School in Accra from 1929 to 1930.

Between 1931 and 1939, he pursued various courses in infantry and army signals training, including shorthand, typing, and short story writing. He also qualified through the Regent Institute of Journalism. In 1941, after recovering from a boxing-related jaw injury, he passed the Royal Air Force (RAF) medical examination and completed a Non-Commissioned Officer (NCO) course in 1943.

He later pursued higher education as an external student at London University, earning an inter-BSc Economics degree in 1947 and a Diploma in Public Administration in 1951. In 1966, he completed his BSc in Economics. On February 7, 1964, he was elected a Fellow of the Royal Economic Society.

== Career ==
De Graft-Hayford's career began in the civil service, where he served as a Second Division Clerk and later as Assistant Officer Gazeteer. He also worked as a broadcast announcer for ZOY, a radio station.

From 1939 to 1948, he served in the military, joining the Gold Coast Regiment and later the Royal West African Frontier Force (RWAFF). Despite being considered too old for a commission in infantry, he specialized in signals and logistical roles, earning a commission as a lieutenant in the Royal Army Service Corps in 1946. He served in North Africa and the UK before his demobilization in 1948.

Returning to Ghana, de Graft-Hayford worked with the Gold Coast Cocoa Marketing Board from 1948 to 1953, rising to the position of acting general manager. He was later recalled to the Ghana Armed Forces in the late 1950s and appointed Commanding Officer of the 1st Battalion of Infantry.

In 1962, he became the Chief of Air Staff (CAS) and briefly served as acting Chief of Defence Staff. He collaborated with Hanna Reitsch, Adolf Hitler's former personal pilot, to establish Ghana's first National School of Gliding under Kwame Nkrumah's administration.

After retiring from the armed forces in 1965, he held various public service roles, including Chairman of the Ghana Workers Brigade and Chief Security Officer for the Ghana Cocoa Marketing Board. He also served as the first Chairman of Ghana's branch of Amnesty International.

== Boxing ==
De Graft-Hayford was a professional welterweight boxer in the 1930s, fighting under the pseudonym "The Chocolate Kid." He won the Sir Arnold Hudson Trophy in 1935 and claimed the Welter-Weight championship.

Between 1974 and 1978, he chaired the Ghana Boxing Board of Control, playing a key role in Ghana's emergence in international boxing, including the rise of world champion D.K. Poison.

== Family ==
De Graft-Hayford was married to Phyllis de Graft-Hayford (née Stiff), who co-founded the first childcare center in Ghana. The couple had five children. He also had two siblings, Dr. Mark Davy-Hayford and Mary Ruth Ernestina Edmondson OBE.

His father, Rev. Mark Christian Hayford, was a prominent clergyman, while his extended family includes notable figures in Ghanaian history, such as the Casely Hayford and Brew families.

Military offices
Preceded by J. N. H. Whitworth	Chief of the Air Staff; 1961–1963	Succeeded by Michael Otu
