= Lawrence Okai =

Member of the Supreme Military Council
- In office 9 October 1975 – November 1976
- President: Ignatius Kutu Acheampong

Personal details
- Born: 19 October 1932 Asafo-Akim, Ghana
- Died: 26 October 2017 (aged 85)
- Profession: Soldier

Military service
- Allegiance: Ghana
- Branch/service: Ghana Army
- Years of service: 1954 – 1976
- Rank: Lieutenant General
- Commands: Chief of Defence Staff
- Other work: National Council Chairman of the Veterans Association of Ghana

Lieutenant General Lawrence Aboagye Okai (19 October 1932 – 26 October 2017) was a Ghanaian army officer. He was the Chief of the Defence Staff of the Ghana Armed Forces. He also served on the Supreme Military Council (SMC) of the government led by General Acheampong.

== Army career ==
Lawrence Okai volunteered for service in the Gold Coast Regiment of the Royal West African Frontier Force. He was selected to be trained as officer at the Royal Military Academy Sandhurst (RMAS), in the United Kingdom and was commissioned on 16 December 1955. In 1958, he became one of the original officers of the Ghana Regiment, when the Gold Coast gained its independence.

Okai served in the Ghana Army, and rose from 2nd Lieutenant to the rank of Major General.

General Okai was then chosen to be overall commander of the Armed Forces of Ghana, and was further promoted on appointment: he was Chief of the Defence Staff from December 1974 to November 1976.

== Politics ==
After the National Redemption Council took power, it formed a Supreme Military Council (SMC) to provide the executive government. The SMC was composed of the service chiefs and as the head of the armed forces, General Okai became a member of the military government. He served in the junta until he retired as Chief of the Defence Staff in November 1976, when he was succeeded in both roles by Lieutenant General Fred Akuffo.

== Retirement and death ==
In retirement, he became active in the Veterans Association of Ghana, and later served as the Chairman of its National Council.

Okai died on 26 October 2017, at the age of 85. He was buried, with military honours, in January 2018.

== Sources ==
- Ghana Armed Forces website
- Ghana Home Page

Military offices
Preceded by Air Vice Marshal Napoleon Ashley-Larsen	Chief of Defence Staff; 1974 – 1976^{1}	Succeeded by Lieutenant General Fred Akuffo
Notes and references
1. http://www.gaf.mil.gh/index.php?CatId=117
