= Arnold Quainoo =

Ghanaian military officer

- Born: 5 July 1939; Kpando, British Gold Coast
- Died: 2 December 2024 (aged 85); Accra, Ghana
- Military career
- Allegiance: Ghana
- Branch: Army
- Rank: Lieutenant General
- Nickname: Buffalo Soldier
- Commands: Chief of the Defence Staff; ECOMOG Commander; Chief of Army Staff

Lieutenant General Arnold Quainoo (5 July 1939 - 2 December 2024) was a Ghanaian former military officer and served as the Chief of Defence Staff of the Ghana Armed Forces from August 1983 to September 1989. He took over from Flight Lieutenant J. J. Rawlings and handed over to Lieutenant General Winston Mensa-Wood.

== Career ==
He was the first commander of the Economic Community of West African States Monitoring Group (ECOMOG) which intervened in Liberia to help end the civil war.

He served twice as Army Commander, first in 1979 following the coup-d'état by the Armed Forces Revolutionary Council which overthrew the Supreme Military Council. He was replaced when the Limann government was elected. He was re-appointed as Chief of Army Staff following the coup by the Provisional National Defence Council and later as General Officer Commanding the Ghana Armed Forces.

In 2014, Quainoo denied any responsibility for the death of Liberian President Samuel Doe.

Quainoo died at the 37 Military Hospital in Accra on Monday, December 2, 2024, at the age of 85.

Military offices
Preceded by Brigadier Joseph Nunoo-Mensah	Chief of Army Staff; 1979	Succeeded by Brigadier I. K. Amoah
Preceded by Brigadier I. K. Amoah	Chief of Army Staff; 1982–1987	Succeeded by Lieutenant-General W. M. Mensa-Wood
Preceded by Flight Lieutenant Jerry Rawlings	Chief of Defence Staff; 1983– 1989	Succeeded by Lieutenant-General W. M. Mensa-Wood
New title	ECOMOG Commander; 1990	Succeeded by Major General Joshua Dogonyaro
