= Kanwar Jaswant Singh =

First chief of airstaff Ghana

Air Vice Marshal Kanwar Jaswant Singh PVSM

2nd Air Officer Commanding-in-Chief Eastern Air Command
- In office 3 March 1962 – 1 January 1963
- President: Sarvepalli Radhakrishnan
- Prime Minister: Jawaharlal Nehru
- Preceded by: Kundan Lal Sondhi
- Succeeded by: Shivdev Singh

4th Air Officer Commanding-in-Chief Training Command
- In office 27 May 1958 – 22 March 1959
- President: Rajendra Prasad
- Prime Minister: Jawaharlal Nehru
- Preceded by: Pratap Chandra Lal
- Succeeded by: Ranjan Dutt

1st Chief of Ghana Air Force
- In office May 1959 – August 1960
- Preceded by: Office established
- Succeeded by: Ian Gundry-White

Personal details
- Born: 15 September 1915 United Province, British India
- Died: 1 January 1963 (aged 47) India
- Spouse: Mariam Khan
- Relations: Abdul Jabbar Khan (father-in-law)
- Education: Indian Military Academy
- Awards: Param Vishisht Seva Medal

Military service
- Allegiance: British India (1937–1947); India (1947–1963)
- Branch/service: British Indian Army; Royal Indian Air Force; Indian Air Force; Ghana Air Force
- Years of service: 1937-1963
- Rank: Air Vice Marshal
- Commands: Eastern Air Command; Training Command
- Battles/wars: World War II; Indo-Pakistani War of 1947

Air Vice Marshal Kanwar Jaswant Singh, PVSM (15 September 1915 – 1 January 1963) was an Indian Army and Indian Air Force officer and also served in the Ghana Air Force. He was the Chief of Air Staff of the Ghana Air Force from May 1959 to August 1960. He was the AOC-in C of Training Command and Eastern command in Indian Air Force.

== Early life ==
Singh belonged to the royal family of Kapurthala. He was born to Jasbir Kaur and Mabel Singh on 19 September 1915 in Budaun, United Provinces. He was nicknamed Jumper because of his inability to pronounce his own name. In January 1927, he went to study at the Prince of Wales Royal Indian Military College (RIMC) in Dehradun. He graduated from RIMC in February 1936. He graduated from the Indian Military Academy.

== Military career ==
Jaswant Singh joined the 4/12th Frontier Force Regiment in 1937. He saw action at Fort Jamrud against the Pashtuns in 1939. Singh signed up to be transferred to the IAF and was seconded in June 1940 as a Flying Officer. He was the fifth Army officer to offer himself for such an assignment. He joined the 3rd Pilot Course at the Initial Training School, Walton, Lahore, to undergo his ground and flying training, and completed his advanced training from the Service Flying Training School, Ambala, at the end of May 1941. He led a squadron into operations in Burma during World War II. He commanded the offices of several senior command and staff appointments. Jaswant Singh took charge as Air Officer Commanding-in-Chief, Eastern Air Command in March, 1962. He organised his command to undertake logistic support operations in the NEFA and Assam areas. He was also in the charge Air Officer in charge of Training Command. He later became the CAS of Ghana Air Force.

== Awards ==
He was posthumously awarded the Param Vishisht Seva Medal for his distinguished service to the Indian Air Force.

== Personal life ==
Jaswant Singh married Mariam Khan (1920–1988), the only daughter of North West Frontier Province's former Prime Minister, Abdul Jabbar Khan, popularly known as Dr Khan Sahib, and niece of Abdul Ghaffar Khan. It was a high-profile wedding.

== Death ==
Twenty-five days later taking charge of AOC in C Eastern Command, on New Year's Eve of 1963, Singh died after suffering a heart failure.
