= Samuel Gyabaah =

Ghanaian politician

Minister for the Upper Region
- In office 1978 – 4 June 1979
- President: Fred Akuffo (Head of state)

Personal details
- Profession: Soldier

Military service
- Allegiance: Ghana
- Branch/service: Ghana Air Force
- Rank: Wing Commander
- Commands: Chief of Air Staff

Wing Commander Samuel Gyabaah was a Ghanaian soldier and politician. He was a member of the then Supreme Military Council (SMC) and the Minister for the Upper Region (now divided into the Upper East and Upper West regions) from 1978 until 4 June 1979 when the Armed Forces Revolutionary Council (AFRC) took over power in a coup d'état. Following the overthrow of the SMC, he was appointed Chief of Air Staff by the AFRC on 6 June 1979. He held this appointment until July 1979 when he was replaced by Captain F. W. K. Klutse.

== See also ==
- Supreme Military Council (Ghana)
- Chief of Air Staff (Ghana)
