= Geoffrey Mawuli Biekro =

Ghanaian Military Officer

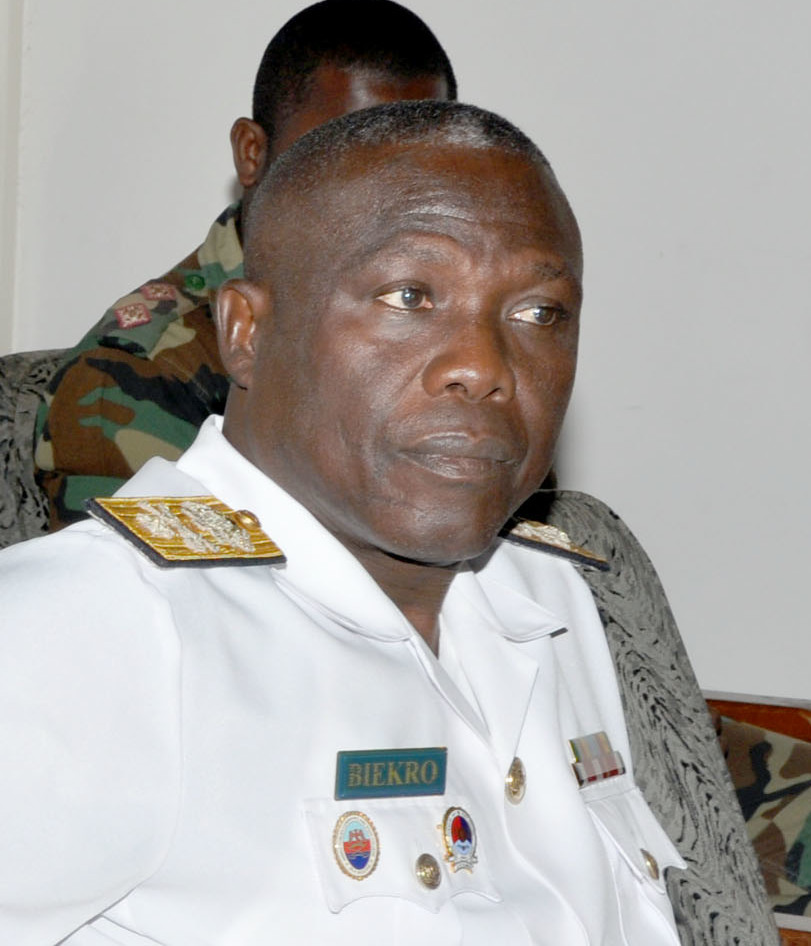
- Biekro in 2012
- Born: 28 August 1952 (age 74); Dodome, Ghana
- Military career
- Allegiance: Ghana
- Branch: Ghana Navy
- Service years: 1975 – 4 January 2016.
- Rank: Rear Admiral
- Commands: Chief of Naval Staff

Rear Admiral Geoffrey Mawuli Biekro (born 28 August 1952) is a Ghanaian Military Officer. He served as the Chief of Naval Staff from March 2013 to January 2016. His appointment to the position was done after Vice Admiral Matthew Quashie was elevated to Chief of Defence Staff .

Military offices
Preceded by Matthew Quashie	Chief of Naval Staff; Apr 2013 – Jan 2016	Succeeded by Peter Faidoo
