= Frederick Asare Bekoe =

Ghanaian soldier and Chief of Air Staff of the Ghana Air Force

- Born: Frederick Asare Kwasi Bekoe; 28 May 1967 (age 59); Akim Oda, Eastern Region, Ghana
- Education: Ghana Military Academy; Air Command and Staff College, Air University (United States Air Force); Air War College, Air University (United States Air Force)
- Military career
- Allegiance: Ghana
- Branch: Ghana Air Force
- Service years: 1988–2025
- Rank: Air Marshal
- Commands: Chief of Air Staff

Air Marshal Frederick Asare Kwasi Bekoe is a Ghanaian military officer who served as Chief of Air Staff of the Ghana Air Force. He was appointed to this position by President Nana Akufo-Addo on 26 January 2023, and held office until 27 March 2025.

== Early life and education ==
Bekoe was born on 28 May 1967, in Akim Oda, in the Eastern Region of Ghana. He attended Hecta International School in Akim Oda for his basic education before continuing his studies at St. John's Grammar Secondary School (now St. John's Grammar Senior High School) in Achimota, Accra. There, he obtained the West Africa Examination Council Certificate (O-Level) in 1985, and in 1987, he obtained the GCE Advanced Level Certificate (A-Level) from the Accra Academy. He is a graduate of the United States Air Force Air University in Alabama. There, he completed the Air Command and Staff College in 2004, where he earned a Diploma in Operational Art and Science. Additionally, he furthered his education by attending the Air War College from May 27, 2014, to May 26, 2015, and successfully obtained a Master's degree in Strategic Studies.

Bekoe has participated in numerous training programs and seminars over the years, which include completing the Military Law Course in 1995, attending the Intelligence and Security Course in 1997, receiving Computer Processing Training in 1998, and completing the UN Military Observer Course at the International Peace Support Training Center (IPSTC) in Karen, Kenya, in 2006. In 2009, he also completed the Next Generation of African Leaders Course at the Africa Center for Strategic Studies (ACSS) in Washington, D.C. Additionally, in March 2010, he underwent Fokker 28 Recurrent Training in Dinard, France, and obtained a Falcon 900EX Easy Type Rating at CAE (UK) in the same year.

== Military career ==
Bekoe enlisted as a Flight cadet in the Ghana Military Academy in Teshie on 11 November 1988. After completing the Standard Military Course at Teshie, he underwent Ground School training at the Flying Training School in Takoradi to prepare for flying training. In 1989, he went to Libya with nine other cadets to learn how to fly at the Libyan Air Academy in Misurata. When he came back in 1991, he was the only one in his group who became a qualified pilot. He officially became a pilot in the Ghana Air Force on 17 August 1990.

After coming back from Libya in 1991, he and eight other pilot trainees went to the Pegasus Flight Center in Fort Worth, Texas. They were the first pilots from the Ghana Air Force to get trained in the United States. He worked really hard and got his Commercial Pilot Licence with Instrument Rating in May 1992.

Throughout his career, Bekoe has served the Ghana Air Force in various capacities, acquiring knowledge of Air Force matters at both staff and operational levels. He began as a Squadron Adjutant and later became a Flight Commander/Training Officer on 15 November 2001. He became the leader of the Executive Transport Squadron (also known as the Communications Squadron) at Air Force Base in Accra on 12 June 2004. While the leader of the Executive Transport Squadron at Air Force Base in Accra, he served as a Military Observer within the United Nations Mission in Liberia (UNMIL) from May 2006 to June 2007. After that, he moved up to be in charge of the Flying Wing at Air Force Base in Accra from October 2011 to May 2014. During this time, he was chosen to attend the Air War College at the Air University, which is located at Maxwell Air Force Base in Montgomery, Alabama.

After completing the Air War College successfully, Bekoe was assigned to work at Air Force Headquarters starting from 8 June 2015, until 8 January 2016. In his role as Director of Air Operations, he had several responsibilities. He had to advise the Chief of the Air Staff on various air-related matters, which included the training and career advancement of all pilots, air traffic controllers, and aerofiremen.

During his time in this position, he oversaw the successful training of 6 helicopter pilots and 6 fixed-wing aircraft pilots, starting from their very beginning and helping them to become licensed commercial pilots. He also supervised the training of 4 flight instructors, 2 for helicopter pilots and 2 for fixed-wing aircraft pilots.

From January 2016 to January 2019, he held the position of Base commander of Air Force Base, Accra. Subsequently, he served as the Air Officer Special Duties at the Jubilee House, responsible for matters concerning the Presidential aircraft, reporting to the Chief of Staff at the Presidency.

Bekoe is a Flight Instructor who earned his certificate from Flight Safety International in Vero Beach, Florida, USA. He also possesses an Airline Transport Pilot Licence. Bekoe also serves as the pilot for the Presidential aircraft, having flown five consecutive Presidents. As a Command pilot, he has over 10,000 flying hours. In his operational capacity, he both flies and imparts instruction to pilots on various aircraft, including the Falcon 900EX EASy, Fokker 28, Fokker 27, and Defender BN-2T. Additionally, he has hands-on experience with the Super Tucano, Piper Seminole, Piper Arrow, Piper Cadet, Baron BE-55, and has served as an Instructor Pilot for the Cessna 150/152/172, as well as the Bulldog aircraft.

== Chief of Air staff ==
On 26 January 2023, Bekoe was appointed as the Chief of Air Staff of the Ghana Air Force by President Nana Addo Dankwa Akufo-Addo. The position is appointed by the President of Ghana in consultation with the Council of State, in accordance with the provisions of Article 212 of the 1992 Constitution. This appointment followed the completion of the tour of duty and subsequent retirement from the Ghana Armed Forces (GAF) of the previous Chief of Air Staff, Air Vice Marshal Frank Hanson.

In his role, he leads the Air Force in its mission to maintain peace and security in Ghana and the Sub-region.

At his induction into office, Bekoe outlined his vision of building a thriving Air Force. He emphasised the importance of enhancing the capabilities of personnel and facilitating the retooling of the Force to support their operations. He acknowledged the accomplishments of previous Chiefs of the Air Staff with an aim to build upon their achievements.

== Awards and honours ==
Air Vice Marshal Bekoe has been honoured with awards and decorations throughout his career, they include:

- The Speed Bird Trophy Award, for his exceptional flying skills and airmanship.
- The Best Young Officer Award, bestowed upon him for his exemplary military discipline, bearing, and turnout.
- The Republic Day Medal, for his contributions to the nation.
- The June 4th Revolution Day Medal, in recognition of his service during this important period in Ghana's history.
- The 31st December Revolution Day Medal, for his involvement in significant events in Ghana's history.
- The Economic Community of West African States Monitoring Group (ECOMOG) in Liberia Medal, for his service in a regional peacekeeping mission.
- The Long Service and Efficiency Medal, for his dedication and efficiency in his military service.
- The UN Mission in Liberia (UNMIL) Medal, awarded for his role in UN peacekeeping efforts.
- The 50th Anniversary of Ghana’s Independence Medal, celebrating Ghana's milestone achievement.
- The Ghana Air Force Golden Jubilee Medal, for his contributions to the Ghana Air Force during its 50th anniversary.

Bekoe was honoured with a Presidential Commendation by former President John Evans Atta Mills in recognition of his commitment, dedication, and exemplary display of professionalism. Additionally, the then Defence Minister, Lt Gen Joseph Henry Smith, extended commendation for his contributions towards the acquisition of a new executive aircraft. Furthermore, the then Chief of Air Staff also commended him for his exemplary skills and professionalism in effectively managing an in-flight emergency.

== Personal life ==
Bekoe is married to Mrs. Rosette Okyere Bekoe, and they have two daughters.

== See also ==
- Ghana Air Force
- Ghana Armed Forces
- Chief of Air Staff (Ghana)

Military offices
Preceded by Frank Hanson	Chief of Air Staff; 23 January 2023 –	Succeeded by Current
