= Napoleon Ashley-Lassen =

Ghanaian military chief

N. Y. R. Ashley-Lassen
- Born: 29 March 1934 (age 92); Port Harcourt, Nigeria
- Military career
- Allegiance: Ghana
- Branch: Ghana Air Force
- Service years: ? - 1974
- Rank: Air Vice Marshall (Major General)
- Commands: Chief of the Defence Staff; Chief of Air Staff
- Other work: Member of NRC government

Napoleon Yaovi Richard Ashley-Lassen (born 29 March 1934) was a Chief of the Defence Staff of the Ghana Armed Forces. He was also twice Chief of Air Staff of the Ghana Air Force. He was also a member of the National Redemption Council (NRC), formed after the overthrow of the Busia government in 1972.

== Career ==
Ashley-Lassen was born in Port Harcourt, Nigeria in 1934. He was commissioned into the Ghana Army. At one stage, he served as a pilot ferrying Ghanaian troops to and from the Democratic Republic of Congo during the United Nations peace keeping exercise there. He was appointed Chief of Air Staff in 1968 when the National Liberation Council military government was in power. He served a second brief term between December 1971 and January 1972. Following the overthrow of the Busia government on 13 January 1972, he was appointed as the Chief of the Defence Staff, a position he held until December 1974.

== Politics ==
Following the 13 January 1972 coup d'état led by then Colonel Acheampong, he was appointed a member of the ruling National Redemption Council military government.

Military offices
Preceded by Air Vice Marshall M. A. Otu	Chief of Air Staff; 1968 – 1971	Succeeded by Air Commodore Charles Beausoliel
Preceded by Air Commodore Charles Beausoliel	Chief of Air Staff; 1971 – 1972	Succeeded by Air Commodore Charles Beausoliel
Preceded by Major General D. K. Addo	Chief of Defence Staff; 1972 – 1974	Succeeded by Major General Lawrence A. Okai
Notes and references
1. http://www.gaf.mil.gh/index.php?CatId=119; 2. http://www.gaf.mil.gh/index.php?CatId=117
