= E. D. F. Prah =

Former Chief of Defence Staff of Ghana

- Military career
- Allegiance: Ghana
- Branch: Ghana army
- Commands: Chief of the Defence Staff (5 Jun 1979—7 Jul 1979)
- Other work: Executive Director of the Veteran Association of Ghana

Colonel E. D. F. Prah is a former Chief of Defence Staff of the Ghana Armed Forces. This was after the Armed Forces Revolutionary Council overthrew the Supreme Military Council led by Lt. General Fred Akuffo in June 1979. He was replaced in July 1979 by Brigadier Joshua Nunoo-Mensah.

After retiring from the Ghana Armed Forces, he served as executive director of the Veterans Association of Ghana.

Military offices
| Preceded by Lieutenant General Joshua Hamidu | Chief of the Defence Staff; 1979 | Succeeded by Brigadier Joseph Nunoo-Mensah |
