= Joshua Mensah-Larkai =

Ghanaian military officer and Air Vice Marshal

Joshua Lartei Mensah-Larkai
- Born: Accra, Greater Accra Region, Ghana
- Allegiance: Ghana
- Branch: Ghana Air Force
- Service years: 1992 to present
- Rank: Air Vice Marshal
- Commands: Chief of Staff, Ghana Armed Forces; Commander, Air Force Base Tamale; Commander, Air Force Base Accra
- Conflicts: First Ivorian Civil War; Second Liberian Civil War
- Awards: Long Service and Efficiency Medal; UNIMIL Unified Service Medal; UNOCI Medal; Odartey Baanor Award
- Education: Ghana Institute of Management and Public Administration (BS); Air University (MS); King’s College London (MA)

Air Vice Marshal Joshua Lartei Mensah-Larkai is a Ghanaian air force officer who serves as Chief of Staff at the General Headquarters of the Ghana Armed Forces, a position to which he was appointed in March 2025. He has commanded key Ghana Air Force bases and served in multiple international and operational roles throughout his career.

== Early life and education ==
Joshua Mensah-Larkai was born in Accra, in the Greater Accra Region of Ghana. He attended Accra Academy, where he completed his General Certificate of Education Ordinary and Advanced Levels in 1986 and 1988 respectively. He then enrolled at the Ghana Military Academy for basic military training and was commissioned as a pilot into the Ghana Air Force on 26 October 1992.

Mensah-Larkai has completed numerous professional military courses, including the Flight Commanders’ Course (Accra), the Junior Staff Course (Jaji, Nigeria), and the Senior Staff Course (Montgomery, Alabama, USA). His flight training includes a Commercial Pilot License course at Sierra Academy of Aeronautics (Oakland, California, USA), Mi-17 Helicopter training at Kazan Helicopters (Russia), Night Vision Goggles training at the Royal Air Force (RAF) Shrewsbury (UK), and a Ground Instructors’ Course at RAF Cranwell (UK).

He holds a Diploma and a Bachelor of Arts (Honours) degree in Public Administration from the Ghana Institute of Management and Public Administration (GIMPA). He also holds master's degrees in Military Operational Art & Science from the Air University, Montgomery, Alabama, and in International Security and Strategy from King’s College London.

== Military career ==
Mensah-Larkai’s early Ghana Air Force career included operational and command positions. He served as Base Adjutant, Flight Commander, and Squadron Commander of the No. 3 Helicopter Squadron at Air Force Base Accra, and held the role of Director of Validation Standardization Inspection at Air Force Headquarters.

He served in United Nations peacekeeping missions, including with United Nations Operation in Côte d'Ivoire (UNOCI) Ghana Aviation (GHAV) 3 as Operations Officer in 2007–2008, and with the United Nations Mission in Liberia (UNMIL) as a Military Observer. From 2009 to 2010, he was Deputy Commanding Officer/Operations Officer for GHAV 7, and subsequently served as Commander of multiple GHAV contingents between 2011 and 2017.

Mensah-Larkai was appointed Base Commander of Air Force Base Accra and later Air Force Base Tamale, where he also served as 6 Garrison Commander. During his tenure at Tamale, he oversaw infrastructural projects, including a sports complex and creche for base personnel. He handed over command of the base to Air Commodore Nana Adu-Gyamfi on 14 May 2025 after a 2-year and 7-month tour of duty.

In March 2025, Mensah-Larkai was appointed Chief of Staff at the General Headquarters of the Ghana Armed Forces, succeeding Lieutenant General Joseph Prince Osei-Owusu in a formal handover ceremony.

As Chief of Staff, he has undertaken responsibilities including addressing veteran personnel and advocating support initiatives for retired service members.

== Awards and decorations ==
Mensah-Larkai’s military service has been recognized with several honours, including the Long Service and Efficiency Medal, UNMIL Unified Service Medal, UNOCI Medal, the Armed Forces Communications and Electronics Association Prize for overall best student at the Royal College of Defence Studies (UK), and the Odartey Bannor Award for best all-round helicopter pilot graduate during his basic flying training course.

== Personal life ==
He is married to Patricia Dzifa Mensah-Larkai, and the couple has two daughters.

== See also ==
- Ghana Armed Forces
- Ghana Air Force
