= George Boakye =

Ghanaian airman and politician

Air Vice-Marshal George Yaw Boakye

Member of the Supreme Military Council
- In office 1976 – 4 June 1979
- President: Fred Akuffo (Head of state)

Personal details
- Born: 25 December 1937
- Died: 26 June 1979 (aged 41) Accra, Ghana
- Spouse: Beatrice Afua Boakye
- Children: 5
- Profession: Soldier

Military service
- Allegiance: Ghana
- Branch/service: Ghana Air Force
- Years of service: 1959 - 1979
- Rank: Air Vice-Marshal
- Commands: Chief of Air Staff

Air Vice-Marshal George Yaw Boakye (25 December 1937 – 26 June 1979) was an airman and politician. He is a former commander of the Ghana Air Force (November 1976 - June 1979) and member of the Supreme Military Council (SMC) in Ghana. He became a member of the SMC in November 1976 because of his position as the Commander of the Ghana Air Force.

== Death ==
He was executed by firing squad on 26 June 1979.

== Reburial ==
In 2001, the widows of the executed Generals and Colonel petitioned to President Kuffuor who ordered that their remains be exhumed (unearthed). On 27 December 2001 the skeletal remains of the three Ghanaian military heads of state, Generals and Colonel, were returned to their families at a military chapel; 22 years after the Generals were executed in one of the West African country's bloodiest episodes since independence. The ceremony in the capital Accra, attended by more than 2,000 people wearing black and red mourning clothes, was part of efforts by the then President, John Kufuor, to draw a line under a dark chapter in the former British colony's history. On 27 December 2001 Air Vice-Marshal Boakye and Major General Kotei, lying in caskets draped in the national flag, were buried with full military honours at the Osu Military Cemetery in Accra.

Military offices
| Preceded by C Beausoliel | Chief of Air Staff; November 1976 - June 1979 | Succeeded by F W Klutse |
