= Robert Kotei =

Ghanaian soldier and politician (1935–1979)

Member of the Supreme Military Council
- In office 1976 – 4 June 1979
- President: Fred Akuffo (Head of state)

Personal details
- Born: 15 July 1935
- Died: 26 June 1979 (aged 43) Accra, Ghana
- Spouse: Nancy Kotei
- Relations: James Kotei
- Children: 9
- Profession: Soldier

Military service
- Allegiance: Ghana
- Branch/service: Ghana army
- Years of service: ? - 1979
- Rank: Major General
- Commands: Chief of Defence Staff; Chief of Army Staff; Commander, 1st Infantry Brigade (now Southern Command)
- Held the Ghana High Jump record for 36 years

Robert Ebenezer Abossey Kotei (15 July 1935 – 26 June 1979) was a Ghanaian soldier, politician and track and field athlete. He was once the Chief of Defence Staff of the Ghana Armed Forces and also a member of the Supreme Military Council that ruled Ghana between 1975 and 1979. He was executed in 1979, following a military coup. He also held the Ghanaian high jump record for many years.

== Sports ==
Kotei competed for Ghana at the 1958 British Empire and Commonwealth Games held in Cardiff, Wales. He was the only Ghanaian to win a medal at the games. He won the bronze medal in the high jump event with a jump of 6 feet 7 inches (2.01 m).

Kotei won the British AAA Championships title at the 1960 AAA Championships. He subsequently set the Ghana High Jump record in London on 16 July 1960. This record stood for 36 years until 1996. He also competed in the men's high jump at the 1960 Summer Olympics. He also became a member of the Ghana Olympic and Commonwealth Games Committee in 1973.

== Career ==
=== Military ===
Kotei (then a Colonel), was the Commander of the First Infantry Brigade of the Ghana army in the early 1970s. He was instrumental in foiling a coup plot to unseat the then ruling National Redemption Council (NRC) government in 1973. He became the Ghana army commander in April 1976. Two years later, he was appointed the Chief of Defence Staff of the Ghana Armed Forces. He retired from the army in 1979.

=== Politics ===
Kotei was appointed commissioner (minister) for Information by the NRC military government led by General Acheampong. He also worked as the commissioner for Housing. He became a member of the Supreme Military Council (SMC) government formed on 9 October 1975. This replaced the NRC. His appointment was because he was the incumbent army commander. He became Chief of Defense Staff in 1978, following the palace coup that replaced General Acheampong with Lt. General Fred Akuffo.

== Execution ==
On 4 June 1979, the SMC was overthrown by the Armed Forces Revolutionary Council (AFRC) led by Flt. Lt. Jerry Rawlings. Following the bloody coup, Kotei surrendered himself to the authorities at the Achimota Police Station in response to requests that previous political office holders report. Some soldiers apparently "later went to the Police Station and brutalised him when they got to know he was there". His assets were also confiscated to the state. After an investigation that was apparently incomplete and a trial held in camera, Kotei was sentenced to death. It is alleged however that Kotei and his colleagues were probably never tried. On 26 June 1979, Kotei and five other senior army officers, including two former heads of state, Lt. Gen. Fred Akuffo and Lt. Gen. Akwasi Afrifa, were executed by firing squad. Along with the other officers, he was unceremoniously buried at the Nsawam Prisons Cemetery in Adoagyiri, near Nsawam in the Eastern Region. He left behind nine children, including a two-year-old.

== Reburial ==
All eight senior military officers executed in June 1979 were exhumed and their bodies released to their respective families for reburial in 2001. On 27 December 2001, two of the eight, Major General Kotei and Air-Vice Marshal Boakye were buried with full military honours at the Osu Military Cemetery in Accra.

Records
Preceded by ?	High jump – Ghana; 1960 – 1996	Succeeded by Awuku Boateng
Military offices
Preceded by Lieutenant General Fred Akuffo	Chief of Army Staff; 1976 – 1978	Succeeded by Major General Odartey-Wellington
Preceded by Lieutenant General Fred Akuffo	Chief of Defence Staff; 1978	Succeeded by Lt. General Joshua Hamidu
Political offices
Preceded by ?	Commissioner for Information ? – 1978	Succeeded by Colonel Parker H.S. Yarney
Preceded by ?	Commissioner for Housing ? – ?	Succeeded by ?
