= Daniel Addo (soldier) =

Ghanaian general

Daniel K. Addo
- Military career
- Allegiance: Ghana
- Branch: Ghana army
- Rank: Major General
- Commands: Chief of the Defence Staff; Commander, 2nd Infantry Brigade Group (now Northern Command)
- Other work: Commissioner for Agriculture

Major General Daniel K. Addo is a former Chief of the Defence Staff of the Ghana Armed Forces. He is a Ghanaian soldier and politician.

== Career ==
Daniel Addo was once Commander of the Second Infantry Brigade Group (now the Northern Command) of the Ghana army. The headquarters was at Kumasi. He had responsibility for all units in the northern half of Ghana. He became Chief of Army Staff in August 1969. In June 1971, he was appointed Chief of the Defence Staff by the Busia government, a position he still occupied at the time of the coup d'état that replaced it with the National Redemption Council military government. He was relieved of his post after the coup.

== Politics ==
The NRC government appointed Major General Addo as the Commissioner for Agriculture, a positioned he held between 1972 and 1973. He was later replaced with Colonel Frank Bernasko.

== Personal problems ==
In 1982, Daniel Addo had two of his houses confiscated by the "One Man One House" Investigation Sub-Committee under the auspices of the Provisional National Defence Council military government on the grounds that he had acquired them illegally. This was under military decrees of the previous Armed Forces Revolutionary Council, Ghana military government. He appealed unsuccessfully to the Commission on Human Rights and Administrative Justice in 1994 to have the houses returned to him.

Military offices
Preceded by Brigadier D. C. K. Amenu	Chief of Army Staff; 1969–1971	Succeeded by Major General Napoleon Ashley-Larsen
Preceded by Air Marshal Michael Akuoko Otu	Chief of the Defence Staff; 1971–1972	Succeeded by Major General Napoleon Ashley-Larsen
Political offices
Preceded by Kwame Safo-Adu	Minister for Agriculture; 1972–1973	Succeeded by Colonel Frank Bernasko
