= Peter Blay =

Chief of Defence Staff, Ghana

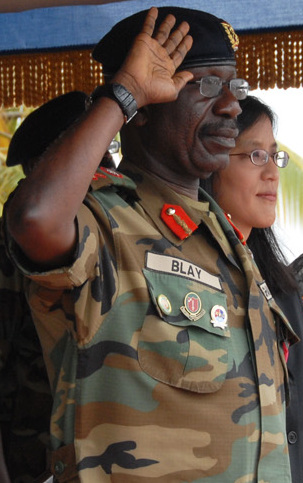
- Peter Blay in 2010
- Military career
- Allegiance: Ghana
- Rank: Lieutenant General
- Commands: Chief of the Defence Staff

Peter Blay is a Ghanaian military officer and was the Chief of Defence Staff of the Ghana Armed Forces. He was appointed by President John Atta Mills in 2009. He handed over to Vice Admiral Matthew Quashie on 28 March 2013.

Military offices
Preceded by Joseph Boateng Danquah	Chief of Defence Staff; 2009 -2013	Succeeded by Matthew Quashie
