= Matthew Quashie =

Ghanaian naval officer (1951–2020)

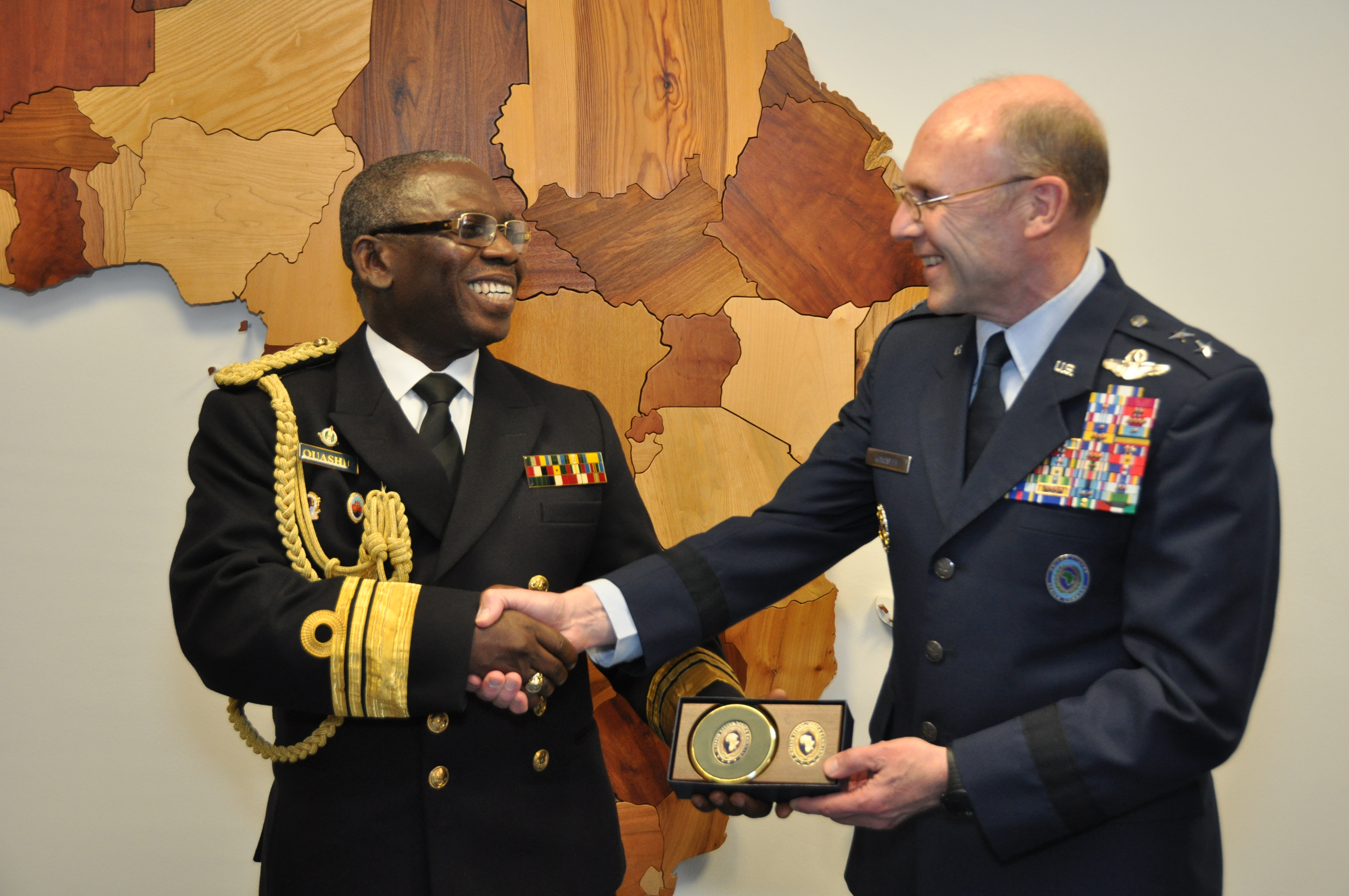
- Born: 23 March 1951; Accra, Ghana
- Died: 9 January 2020 (aged 68); Accra, Ghana
- Military career
- Allegiance: Ghana
- Branch: Ghana Navy
- Service years: 1970–January, 2016.
- Rank: Vice Admiral
- Conflicts: Lebanon War (Nov 1986 to June 1987)

Vice Admiral Mathew Quashie (23 March 1951 - 9 January 2020) was a Ghanaian naval officer and was the twenty-ninth Chief of Defence Staff of the Ghana Armed Forces. He also served as the Chief of Naval Staff of the Ghana Navy from 3 April 2009 to 28 March 2013.

== Early life ==
Vice Admiral Quashie was born on 23 March 1951 in Accra. In 1970 he obtained his General Certificate of Education Ordinary Level Certificate after a five-year secondary school education at Mfantsipim School in Cape Coast. After Mfantsipim School, got admitted into the Ghana Secondary Technical School in Takoradi from 1970 to 1972. He was awarded his Advanced Level Certificate after completion.

== Naval service ==
Vice Admiral Quashie enlisted into the Ghana Military Academy in 1972. He went to the United Kingdom to continue his basic military officer training. He enrolled at the Britannia Royal Naval College and completed his training in 1974. He returned to Ghana and was commissioned Sub-Lieutenant into the Executive Branch of the Ghana Navy in July 1974.

=== Naval appointments ===
Vice Admiral Quashie has served the Navy in various capacities including:

- Watch-Keeping Officer on the Ghana Navy Ships (GNS) Keta, Kromantse, Sahene and Achimota
- Executive Officer on GNS Elmina and Dzata
- Acting Executive Officer on GNS Kromantse.
- Aide-de-Camp to the Chief of the Naval Staff.
- Base Operations Officer, Naval Base Sekondi
- Staff Officer Communication and Intelligence
- Acting Training Officer, Naval Base Sekondi
- Senior Officer Afloat and Commanding Officer Naval Base Sekondi.

He served in the several senior capacities prior to his appointment as the Chief of Staff. They included:

- Director of Operations and Plans at the Naval Headquarters
- Directing Staff at both the Ghana Armed Forces Command College and Nigeria Command and Staff College
- Deputy Commandant Ghana Armed Forces Command and Staff College
- Director Resettlement at General Headquarters (2003) and Chief Staff Officer, Naval Headquarters
- Flag Officer Commanding (FOC) Eastern Naval Command

=== Combat operation ===
During the 1980s Lebanon conflict, Vice Admiral Quashie was appointed Assistant Staff Officer of the United Nations Interim Force in Lebanon.

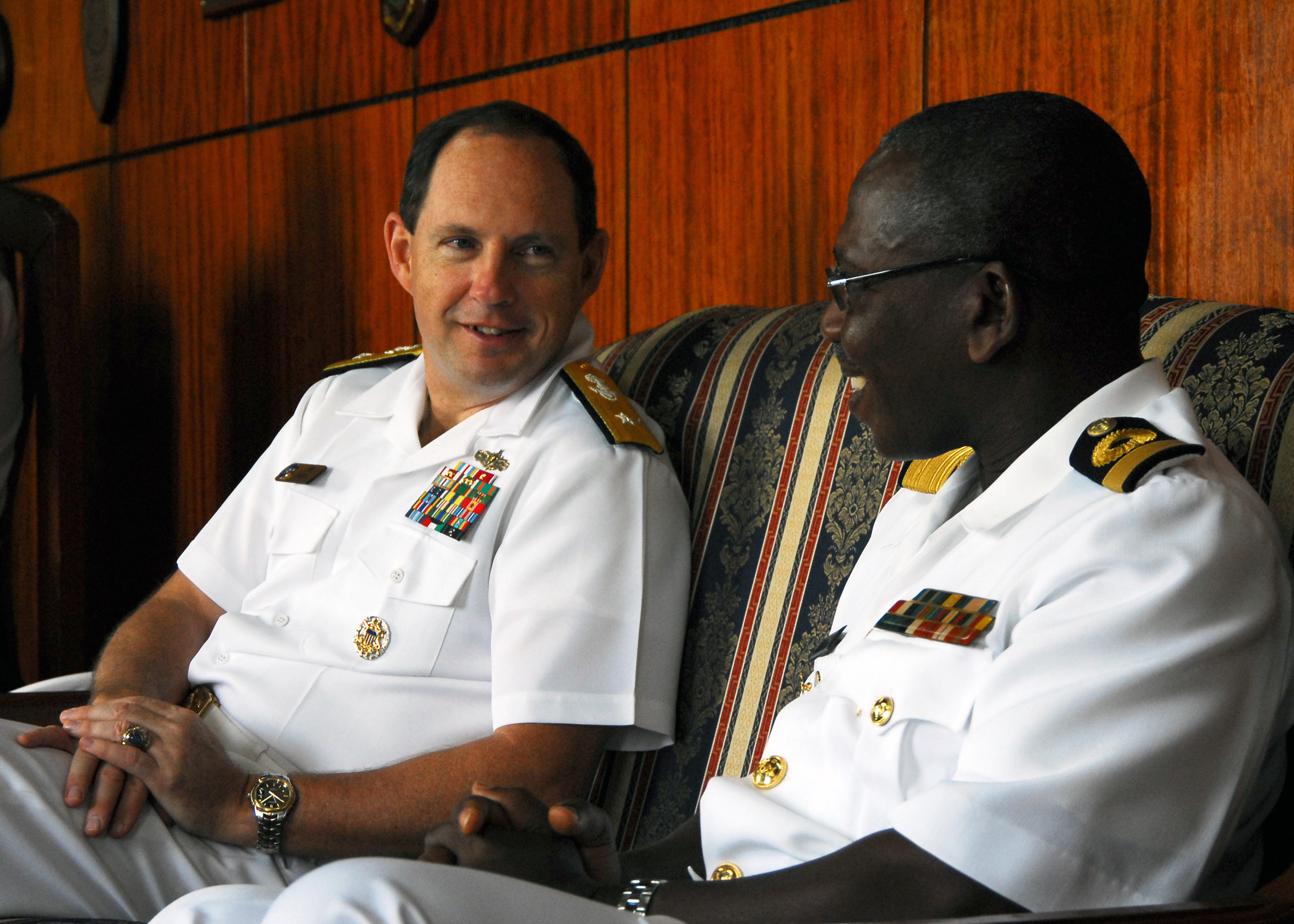
With Rear Adm. Tony Kurta

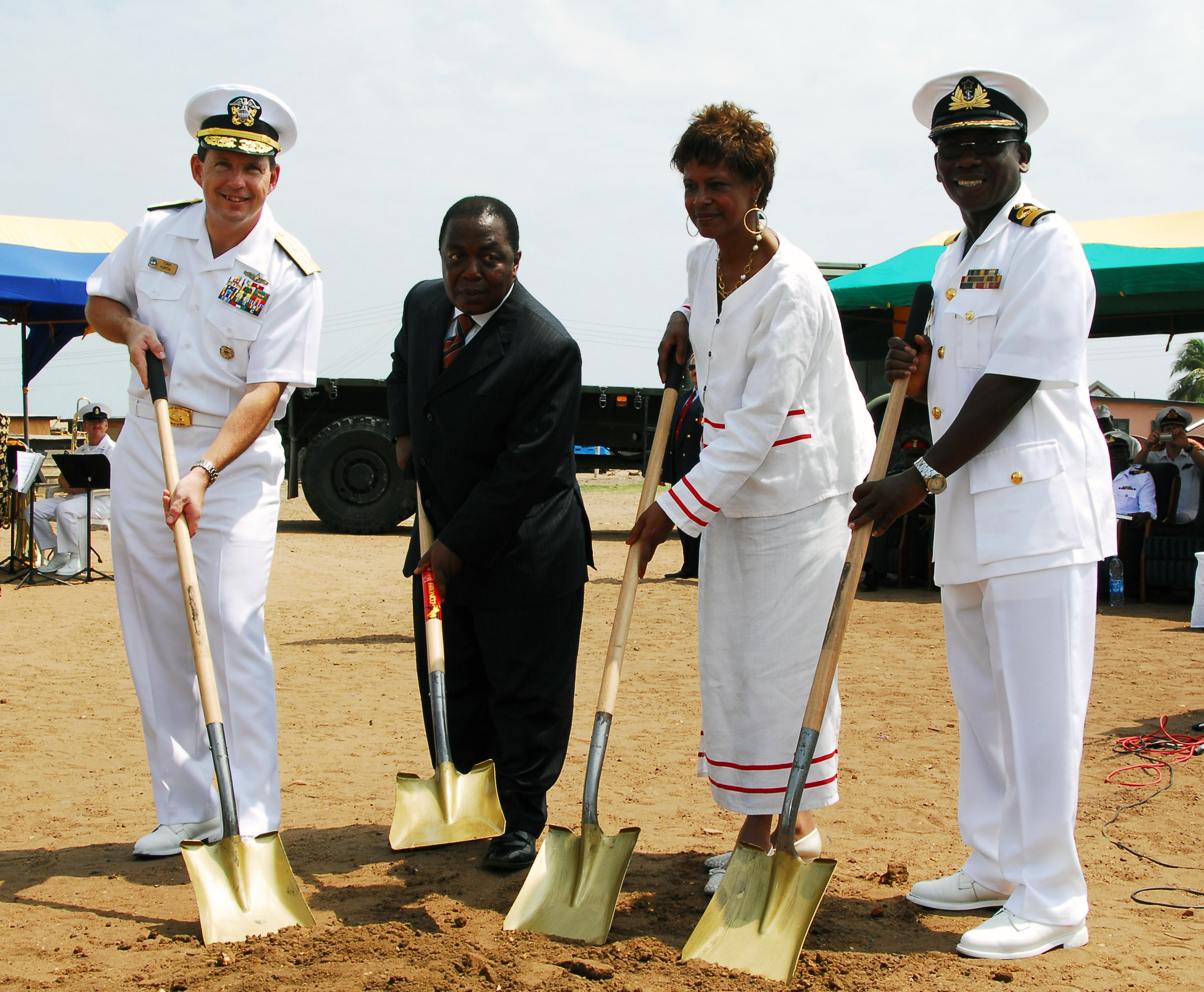
With Rear Adm. Tony Kurta

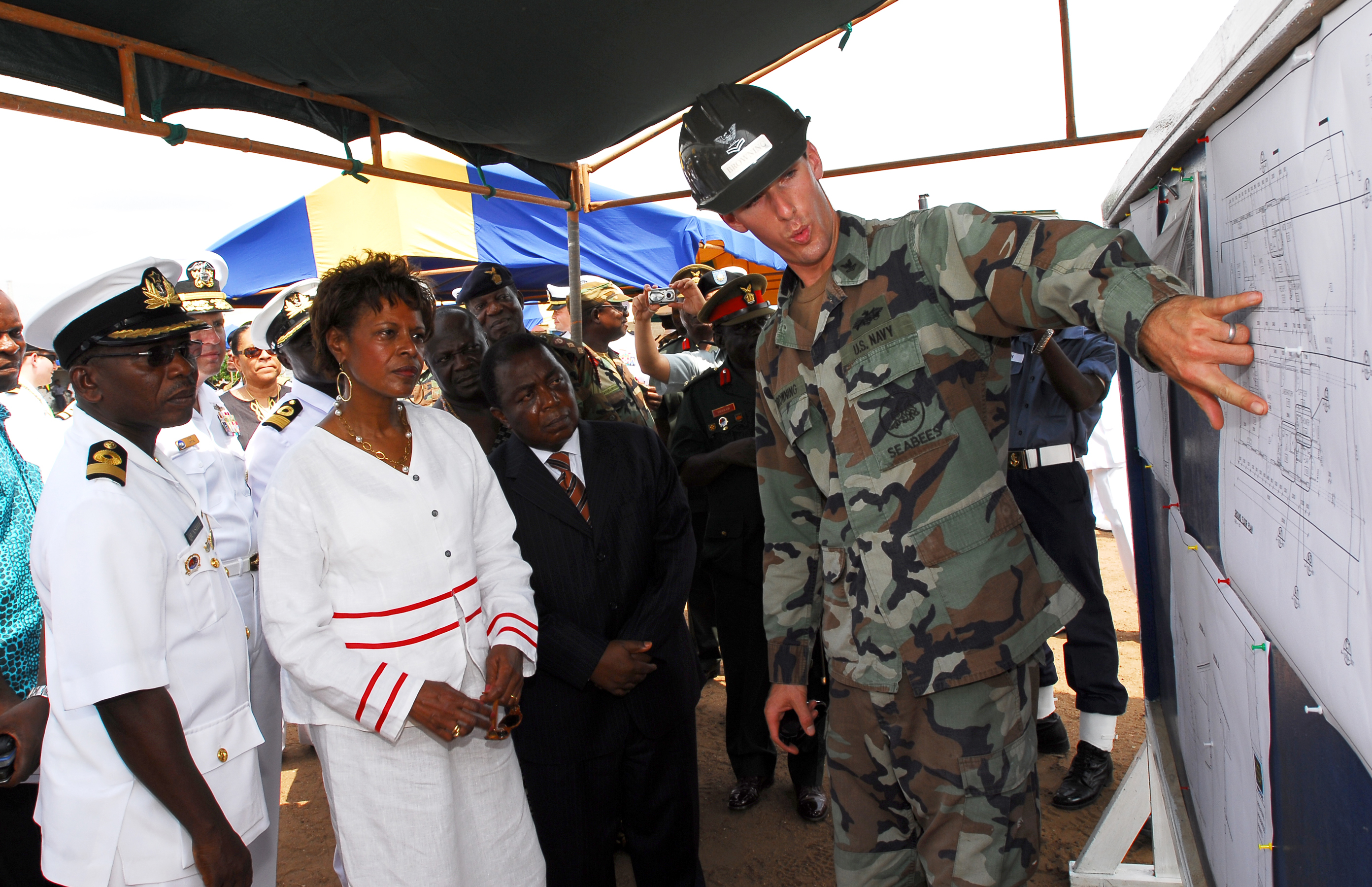
Touring

== Military appointment ==
On 28 March 2013, President John Dramani Mahama, Commander in Chief of the Ghana Armed Forces, swore Vice Admiral Quashie into office as the Chief of the Defence Staff of the Ghana Armed Forces. He replaced Lt Gen. Peter Blay. Prior to his appointment, Vice Admiral Quarshie served as the Chief of Naval Staff. He handed over to Rear Admiral Geoffrey Mawuli Biekro.

== Death ==
On 9 January 2020, Quashie died at the 37 Military Hospital in Accra, where he had been on admission for some time. He had reportedly not been well since he lost his wife in 2019.

Military offices
Preceded by Rear Admiral A. R. S. Nunoo	Chief of Naval Staff; 2009 – 2013	Succeeded by Rear Admiral Geoffrey Mawuli Biekro
Preceded by Lieutenant General Peter Blay	Chief of Defence Staff; 2013 – 2015	Succeeded by Michael Samson-Oje
