= Harry Dumashie =

- Born: Achilles Harry Kwami Dumashie; 4 June 1938; Dzelukope
- Died: 20 December 2002 (aged 64); Accra
- Burial place: Dzelukope
- Military career
- Allegiance: Ghana Armed Forces
- Branch: Ghana Air Force
- Service years: 1961 - 1996
- Rank: Air Marshall
- Commands: Chief of the Defence Staff; Chief of Air Staff
- Other work: Member of PNDC government

Air Marshal Achilles Harry Kwami Dumashie (4 June 1938 - 20 December 2002), often known as Harry Dumashie, was a Ghanaian soldier. He served as Chief of Air Staff and as Ghanaian Chief of Defence Staff from 1992 to 1996.

== Early life and education ==
Dumashie was born at Dzelukope in the Volta Region of Ghana. His secondary school education was at Mawuli School at Ho which he attended between 1955 and 1959. He proceeded to the Ghana Military Academy where he received his military training. He also trained as a pilot at the Pilot Training School at the Accra Air Force Station.

== Career and politics ==
He received his commission into the Ghana Armed Forces on 30 September 1961. He joined the Ghana Air Force, rising through the ranks to become the Chief of Air Staff in June 1988.

Following the death of the Chief of Defence Staff (CDS) Major General Winston Mensa-Wood in March 1992, Dumashie was appointed as his replacement on 22 March 1992. He also succeeded him as a member of the Provisional National Defence Council (PNDC), which was the military government ruling Ghana at the time in his capacity as Chief of Defence Staff. He held this position until the PNDC handed over power to a civilian Rawlings government following the 1992 Ghanaian presidential election. He however continued as the CDS until 1 October 1996 when he was succeeded by Lieutenant General Akafia.

== Death ==
Duamashie died at the 37 Military Hospital in Accra after a short illness.

== Family ==
Dumashie was survived by a wife and six children.

== Honours ==
In October 2012, President John Mahama commissioned equipment including a simulator, three surveillance aircraft and two hangars at the Takoradi Air Force Station. One of the hangars was named the "AVM Achiles Harry Kwame Dumashie Hangar".

Military offices
| Preceded by Air Vice Marshal Kotei | Chief of Air Staff; 1988 – 1992 | Succeeded by Air Marshal Bruce |
| Preceded by Lt. Gen. Mensa-Wood | Chief of the Defence Staff; 1992 – 1996 | Succeeded by Lt. Gen. Akafia |
