= J. E. A. Kotei =

Ghanaian military pilot and diplomat

James Ernest Akrong Kotei
- Born: 26 October 1940
- Died: 22 April 2010 (aged 69)
- Relatives: Robert Kotei
- Military career
- Allegiance: Ghana
- Branch: Ghana Air Force
- Service years: 1961 - 1988
- Rank: Air Vice-Marshal
- Other work: Ambassador to Côte d'Ivoire; Ambassador to Guinea

Air Vice-Marshal James Ernest Akrong Kotei (26 October 1940 – 22 April 2010) was a military pilot and diplomat. He served as a Chief of Air Staff of the Ghana Air Force and later as an Ambassador for Ghana.

James was a brother of Robert Kotei. He started his career in 1961 as a MiG-17 pilot and for the rest of his flying career he switched to the Su-7 ground attack aircraft. He was made a senior commander in the Ghana Air Force and Ghanaian Chief of the Air Staff from December 1982 until June 1988.

In late 1988, Kotei was appointed as Ambassador Extraordinary and Plenipotentiary of the Republic of Ghana to the Ivory Coast; he went on to serve as Ghana's ambassador to Guinea until 2001. He died on 25 April 2010.

Military offices
Preceded by Group Captain E. A. A. Awuviri	Chief of Air Staff (GAF); 1982 – 1988	Succeeded by Air Marshal Harry Dumashie
Diplomatic posts
Preceded by	Ambassador to Côte d'Ivoire; 1988 – ?	Succeeded by
Preceded by	Ambassador to Guinea ? – 2001	Succeeded by
