= Edwin Sam =

Ghanaian Army general (born 1940)

- Born: 10 August 1940 (age 86)
- Military career
- Allegiance: Ghana
- Branch: Ghana army
- Rank: Major General
- Commands: Chief of Defence Staff
- Other work: Member of Council of State of Ghana

Major General Edwin Kwamina Sam (born 10 August 1940) is a member of the Council of State of Ghana. He is also a former Chief of the Defence Staff of the Ghana Armed Forces.

== Education ==
Edwin Sam had his secondary school education at Achimota School between 1955 and 1959.

== Career ==
Sam was a career military officer. He was appointed as the Chief of the Defence Staff briefly between November and December 1979.

== Politics ==
Edwin Sam was appointed onto the Council of State of Ghana due to his position as a former Chief of Defence Staff.

== Other interests ==
Major General Sam has interests in farming and military-civilian relations.

Military offices
Preceded by Brigadier Joshua Nunoo-Mensah	Chief of Defence Staff; 1979	Succeeded by Air Vice-Marshal J. E. Odaate-Barnor
