= Frank Hanson =

Ghanaian chief of Air staff

Frank Hanson AVM
- Born: 30 June 1965 (age 60)
- Allegiance: Ghana
- Branch: Air warfare
- Rank: Air Vice Marshal

Chief of Air Staff Ghana
- In office 2019
- Preceded by: Air Vice Marshal Maxwell Nagai

Frank Hanson (born 30 July 1965) is a Ghanaian Air Force Officer and Pilot holding the rank of Air Vice Marshal. He served as the Chief of Air Staff of the Ghana Air Force, a position he assumed in January 2019 and handed over in January 2023.

== Notes ==
Military offices
Preceded by Maxwell Nagai	Chief of Air Staff; Dec 2018 &–	Succeeded by Current
