= Joseph Boateng Danquah =

Ghanaian chief of defence staff

- Born: 7 July 1947 (age 79)
- Military career
- Allegiance: Ghana
- Branch: Army
- Service years: 1969 – 2009
- Rank: Lieutenant General
- Commands: Chief of Defence Staff
- Awards: Distinguished Service Order

Lieutenant General Joseph Boateng Danquah (born 7 July 1947) was the twenty-seventh Chief of Defence Staff (CDS) of the Ghana Armed Forces.

== Education and Military training ==
Joseph Boateng Danquah attended Pope John Senior High School and Minor Seminary at Effiduase, Koforidua and had his basic military training at the Ghana Military Academy at Teshie in Accra. He did his junior and senior staff courses in Ghana and Nigeria respectively.

== Career ==
Danquah was commissioned as an infantry officer in the Ghana army on 14 December 1969. He has held various positions including the commanding officer of the Third Battalion of Infantry and Four Training Battalion. He has also been director, Army Operations and assistant commandant of the Ghana Armed Forces Command and Staff College (Junior Division).

=== Peacekeeping duties ===
Danquah was the commanding officer of the Second Ghana Battalion of the ECOWAS Ceasefire Monitoring Group (ECOMOG) based in Liberia between October 1990 to June 1991. He has had three duty tours on United Nations peacekeeping missions UNIFIL, southern Lebanon. He was company commander of Ghanbatt 13 on his first duty tour, from May to December 1980. Next he was the second-in-command of Ghanbatt 20, between June 1983 to January 1984. His final tour was as commanding officer of Ghanbatt 36 from September 1991 to April 1992.

=== Senior military duties ===
Between August 1999 and March 2001, he was chief staff officer at Army Headquarters. Prior to his appointment as CDS, he had been the general officer commanding the Southern Command of the Ghana army from March 2001. On 20 May 2005, Danquah then a brigadier, was promoted major general and appointed the CDS of the Ghana Armed Forces by President Kufuor. He was retired in January 2009 when John Atta Mills came to power following the 2008 presidential elections.

== Honours ==
- January 2001 — Awarded the Distinguished Service Order by Ghana government.

Military offices
Preceded by Seth Obeng	Chief of Defence Staff; 2005 – 2009	Succeeded by Peter Blay
