= Peter Faidoo =

Ghanaian naval personnel

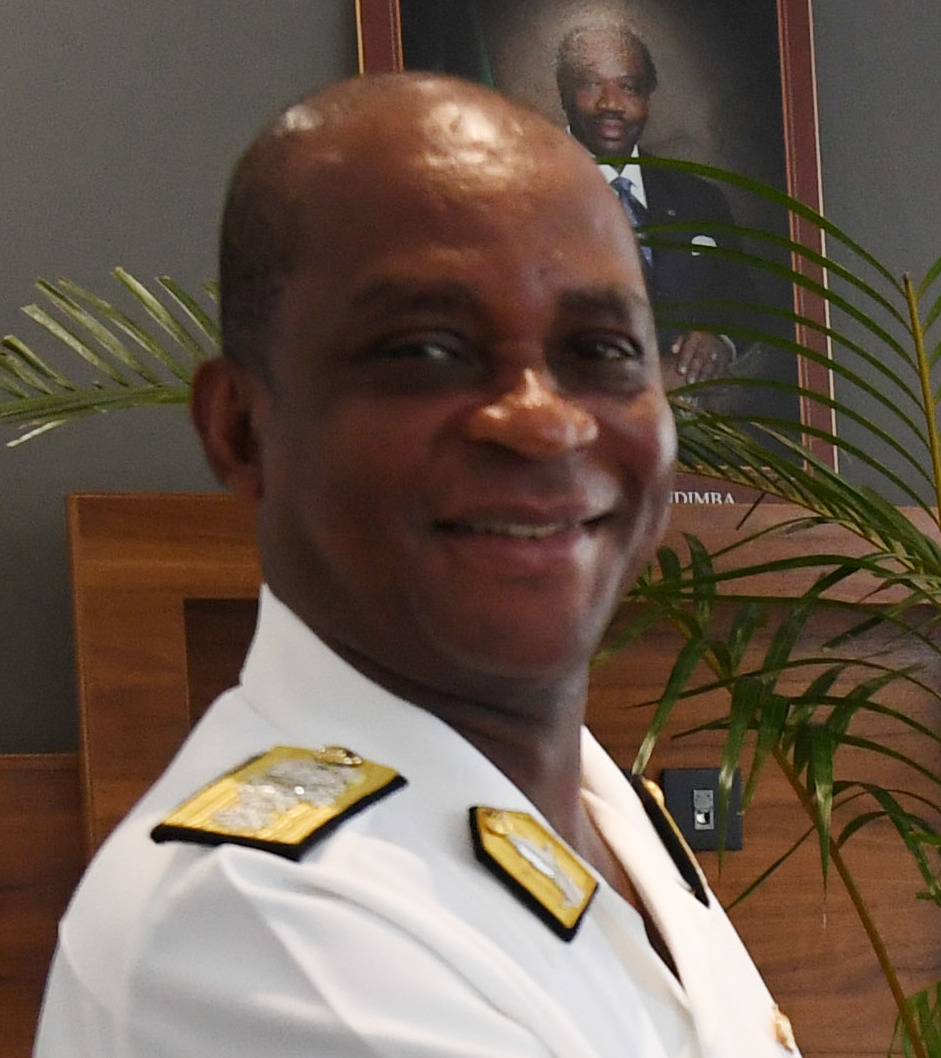
- Faidoo in 2018
- Military career
- Branch: Ghana Navy
- Rank: Rear Admiral
- Commands: Chief of Naval Staff, (2016 - 2018), succeeded by Seth Amoama

Rear Admiral Peter Kofi Faidoo is a Ghanaian naval personnel who served in the Ghana Navy. He served as the Chief of Naval Staff of the Ghana Navy . He was appointed to the position by President John Mahama on 15 January 2016 to 2018. Faidoo visited Western Naval Base Command in Sekondi in a 1-week tour addressing key issues involving a lack of adequate supplies for navy personnel stationed there. He held the appointment as Chief of the Naval Staff until his retirement on 21 December 2018.

He is a product of the Ghana Secondary Technical School(Takoradi)

Military offices
| Preceded by Geoffrey Mawuli Biekro | Chief of Naval Staff; Jan 2016 &– Dec 2018 | Succeeded by Seth Amoama |
