= I. K. Amoah =

Brigadier I. K. Amoah was a Ghanaian military personnel and a former Chief of Army Staff of the Ghana Army. He served as Chief of Army Staff from November 1979 – December 1981.

Military offices
Preceded by Major General Arnold Quainoo	Chief of Army Staff; 1979 – 1981	Succeeded by Major General Arnold Quainoo
