= Seth Obeng =

Chief of Defence Staff, Ghana (born 1945)

- Born: 26 January 1945 (age 81)
- Military career
- Allegiance: Ghana
- Branch: Army
- Service years: 1965 – 2005
- Rank: Lieutenant General
- Commands: Chief of Defence Staff; Commander of the United Nations Interim Force in Lebanon
- Awards: ECOWAS Service Award; National Legion of Cedar Commander Rank; Officer of the National Order of Cote d'Ivoire; US Meritorious Service Medal; International Officer Hall Of Fame
- Other work: Special adviser on African Union matters to the President of Ghana; Member of Council of State

Lieutenant General Seth Kofi Obeng (born 26 January 1945) is a former Chief of Defence Staff (CDS) of the Ghana Armed Forces. He was once also the Commander of the United Nations Interim Force in Lebanon. He is also a special adviser on African Union matters to the President of Ghana.

== Education and training ==
On 15 July 1987, Obeng was awarded a postgraduate Diploma in International Comparative Politics from the London School of Economics and Political Science. Obeng is a graduate of the Army Command and General Staff College, Fort Leavenworth Kansas, United States. He also obtained a Master of Science Degree in Defence Studies from the National War College in Delhi, India in 1992.

== Career ==
Seth Obeng was commissioned into the Ghana army on 16 October 1965 as an Artillery officer. He has been the Commandant of the Military Academy and Training School and Ghana Armed Forces Command and Staff College. He has also been the Chief of Staff, General Headquarters. Lt. Gen. Obeng served as the Defence Adviser to the Ghana High Commission in London from March 1984 to September 1988. On his return to Ghana, he was made the Chief Staff Officer at the Army Headquarters. In October 1989, he was seconded as the managing director to the State Housing Corporation (now State Housing Company). He took a break for a course in India. After that, he returned to his previous role as the managing director of the State Housing Corporation from December 1992 to December 1993. Seth Obeng has also been the Chairman of the Economic Community of West African States (ECOWAS) Defence and Security Commission.

=== Peacekeeping missions ===
Seth Obeng has played senior roles in a number of peacekeeping missions. He was the Deputy Force Commander of the ECOWAS Ceasefire Monitoring Group, (ECOMOG) in Liberia from 19 August 1994 to 30 September 1996. Two years later, he was the Force Commander of the UN Observer and Monitoring Group (MONUA) in Angola from April 1998 to October 1999. On completion of the Angola mission, he was appointed the Force Commander of the UN Interim Force in Lebanon (UNIFIL) from 1999 to 2001. He continued in this position until he was appointed as Chief of the Defence Staff of the Ghana Armed Forces. He is the second Ghanaian military officer to have commanded UNIFIL after Lt Gen Emmanuel Erskine.

== Post military career ==
President Kufuor appointed Seth Obeng as one of his Special advisers on the African Union matters in May 2007. He is currently part of the United Nations Member of the Follow-up Committee on the Greentree Agreement of 12 June 2006.

== Honours ==
- ECOWAS Service Award — ECOWAS Authority in recognition of his contribution to regional peace while serving as the Deputy Force Commander of ECOMOG.
- 12 May 2001 — National Legion of Cedar Commander Rank by Lebanese Government in recognition of his contribution towards lasting peace in Lebanon.
- August 2002 — Officer of the National Order of Côte d'Ivoire by the Côte d'Ivoire Government.
- 28 February 2004 — United States Meritorious Service Medalby the Government of the United States of America.
- March 2004 — Inducted by the United States Government into the International Officer Hall Of Fame at the Army Command and General Staff College at Fort Leavenworth, Kansas, USA.

Military offices
Preceded by Ben Akafia	Chief of Defence Staff; 2001 – 2005	Succeeded by Joseph Boateng Danquah
Preceded by James Sreenan	Commander of the United Nations Interim Force in Lebanon; 1999 – 2001	Succeeded by Ganesan Athmanathan
