= K. K. Pumpuni =

Air Commodore Kwame K. Pumpuni was a Ghanaian air force personnel and served in the Ghana Air Force. He was the Chief of Air Staff of the Ghana Air Force from May 1980 to January 1982.

Pumpuni succeeded Colonel John Kabore as the Chief Administrator of the Korle-Bu Teaching Hospital and served between 1992 and 1997.
