= Ben Akafia =

Ghanaian officer

- Born: 20 December 1940 (age 85); Vui-Keta
- Military career
- Allegiance: Ghana
- Branch: Ghana Army
- Service years: 1961 – 2001
- Rank: Lieutenant General
- Commands: Chief of the Defence Staff
- Awards: MSG
- Other work: Ghana's Ambassador to Egypt

Lieutenant General Ben Akafia MSG (born 20 December 1940) is a retired Ghanaian military officer and served as the Chief of Defence Staff of the Ghana Armed Forces from October 1996 to February 2001. He took over from Air Marshal Achilles Harry Kwami Dumashie and handed over to Lieutenant General Seth Kofi Obeng. He was appointed in 2001 as Ghana's Ambassador to Egypt. He was awarded the National Honour of Member of the Order of the Star of Ghana (MSG) by the President of Ghana on 6 January 2001. He has five sons and a daughter.

== Education and training ==
He was educated at Keta Secondary School. In 1961 he was enlisted into the Ghana Military Academy, Teshie and was selected for further cadet training at the Indian Military Academy, Dehradun, India. He also obtained a Bachelor of Science Degree in War Studies from the National War College in Delhi, India. He also holds a Certificate in Management and is a member of the British Institute of Management.

== Career ==
General Akafia was commissioned into the Ghana Army on 14 September 1963 as an officer. During his 38-year career, he served in various command and staff positions. Between 1963 and 1982, he served in various major command positions including Platoon Commander, through Adjunct, to Company Commander and ended up as a Battalion Commander. He also served in various military training institutions. First, as the Commandant of the Military Academy and Training School from 1983 to 1985. He was the Chief Instructor and Second-in-Command, and later Commanding Officer of the Jungle Warfare School between 1975 and 1977. He served as a Directing staff at the Ghana Armed Forces Command and Staff College. His Senior Staff appointments at the General Headquarters include: Director-General (Personnel Administration, Director-General (Logistics), Director (Military Operations), Director-General (Joint Operations and Plans) and finally the Chief of Staff, General Headquarters. Outside of Ghana, he served as the Deputy Defence Adviser to the Ghana High Commission in Pakistan from 1977 to 1979.

He was appointed Army Commander in 1990 and served in that capacity for six years. He was subsequently appointed as the Chief of the Defence Staff (Ghana) (CDS) of the Ghana Armed Forces in 1996. He retired honourably from the Ghana Armed Forces on 22 March 2001 and was appointed as Ghana's Ambassador to Egypt thereafter.

== Peacekeeping missions ==
From 1985 to 1987, Ben Akafia served as the principal staff officer at the headquarters of the United Nations Interim Force in Lebanon (UNIFIL).

== Post military career ==
President John Kufuor appointed Ben Akafia as Ghana's Ambassador to Egypt in March 2001.

== Honours ==
On 6 January 2001, Ben Akafia was awarded the National Honour of Member of the Order of the Star of Ghana (MSG) by the President of Ghana.

Military offices
Preceded by Air Marshal Achilles Harry Kwami Dumashie	Chief of Defence Staff; 1996– 2001	Succeeded by Lieutenant General Seth Kofi Obeng
