= Seth Koranteng =

Ghanaian diplomat

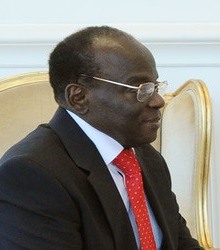
Seth Koranteng

Seth Koranteng is a Ghanaian diplomat and is the current ambassador of Ghana to Russia, presenting his credentials to Russian president Dmitry Medvedev on 16 December 2009. In 2013, scandals at the embassy led to calls for his resignation.
