= Julius Boateng =

Air Vice Marshal Julius Otchere Boateng was a Ghanaian air force personnel and served in the Ghana Air Force. He was the Chief of Air Staff of the Ghana Air Force from 20 May 2005 to 28 January 2009.
