= Joshua Hamidu =

Former Chief of Defence Staff of Ghana (1936–2021)

Lieutenant General Joshua Mahamadu Hamidu
- Born: 1936; Yendi, Gold Coast (now Ghana)
- Died: 1 February 2021 (aged 84–85); 37 Military Hospital, Accra, Ghana
- Military career
- Allegiance: Ghana
- Branch: Ghana Army
- Commands: Chief of the Defence Staff
- Other work: National Security Co-ordinator; Chairman, Narcotics Control Board; High Commissioner to Nigeria

Lieutenant General Joshua Mahamadu Hamidu (1936 – 1 February 2021) was a Ghanaian soldier, politician and diplomat. He has been the Chief of Defence Staff and also member of the Supreme Military Council government. Prior to heading the military and being in government, he was the Ghanaian High Commissioner to Zambia. He was appointed National Security Advisor to the Kufuor government in 2001. He was the chairman of the Narcotics Control Board of Ghana and on various boards of the Bank of Ghana. In 2005, he was Ghana's High Commissioner to Nigeria.

Hamidu had been accused in some circles of being implicated in the killing of the King of Dagbon, the late Yaa-Naa, Yakubu II in March 2002. The Wuaku Commission which investigated the circumstances leading to the tragedy cleared him of any wrongdoing. He died on 1 February 2021 at the 37 Military Hospital in Accra.

Military offices
Preceded by Major General Robert Kotei	Chief of the Defence Staff; 1978 – 1979	Succeeded by Colonel E. D. F. Prah
Diplomatic posts
Preceded by ?	High Commissioner of Ghana to Zambia ? – 1978	Succeeded by ?
Preceded by James Yalley Assuah Kwofie	High Commissioner of Ghana to Nigeria; August 2003 – 2005	Succeeded by George Kumi
