= E. A. A. Awuviri =

Group Captain E. A. A. Awuviri was a Ghanaian air force personnel and served in the Ghana Air Force. He was the Chief of Air Staff of the Ghana Air Force from January 1982 to December 1982.
