= Michael Otu =

Ghanaian Air Force air marshal (1925–2006)

Michael Cbuo Boateng Otu Appong
- Born: 25 October 1925; Adukrom, Ghana
- Died: 8 October 2006 (aged 80); Nkwanta Helicopter Assassination
- Relatives: Beatrice Agyepomaa Otu (wife) Yaa Mina ( wife), Francis (Nana Yaw Ebuo Entsie Dadzie Amoako) Appong, Dominic (Nana Yaw Wiredu Asiaduvor Mensah Larbi) Appong, Isaac (Derrick Boateng Asa Mina Kwame) Appong, Fiifi and Maama (children)
- Military career
- Allegiance: Ghana
- Branch: Ghana Army; Ghana Air Force
- Service years: 1943–1971
- Rank: Air Marshal
- Commands: Chief of Defence Staff; Air Force Commander
- Conflicts: World War Two
- Awards: Order of the Star of Ghana
- Other work: Chief Regent Caretaker (Axim Nkwanta Lands)

Air Marshal Michael Obuo Akuoko Otu Boateng Appong (25 October 1925 – 8 October 2006) was a senior commander in the Ghana Air Force who served as Chief of Air Staff and then Chief of Defence Staff of the Ghana Armed Forces.

== Career ==
As a chief he helped manage Axim Nkwanta lands with Jukwa Entsie Wassa Sekondi Takoradi Kofi Mina, Yaa Mina, Abrewa Comfort Oweriduwaa, Francis Appong Dadzie Entsie through Isaac Asa Derrick Boateng Appong Appau and Dominic Nana Yaw Wiredu Asiaduvor Appong.

He organised and conducted the 1964 Takoradi Air Show by giving some of the jukwa entsie wassa family lands to the Ghana Air force at their present location at airport ridge by Kwesimintism. Unknown to both Francis Appong, Nkrumah with air Marshall after 1962 they had began plotting for a coup d'etat.

Otu was in charge of the Ghana Atomic Program before he was placed under house arrest. Following the coup in 1966, he was told the ouster of Kwame Nkrumah coup was about him as the general rejected the coup.

Samuel Larbi Anyan Bouduom Obrempong Adom Kyei Duah Thompson by 1962 had gone to see the Westlands Tufuhene, by birth Nana Yaw Francis Appong Dadzie Entsie to help him manage the Jukwa westlands in western region. Following years of military coup d 'etat and mismanagement of family lands, some of the nautical miles and lands were recovered.

By 1969 through 1972 Otu was negotiating with the British government to bring back his in law Nkrumah to Ghana during the height of the cold war.

His six kids were assassinated via car accidents over the 1982 execution of the generals, as Jerry Rawlings expressed regret to Isaac Asa Appong, who was held in the USA to test for the word of God, bloodline, skin etc with involuntary sacrifice to test the system for some international opportunities and domestic policies following the assassination of his grandfather in a helicopter crush.

Due to marriages and work with Father Damoah, the two became more than brothers as they believed in Christian governance with an entrepreneurial workforce based on Christian ethics. A form of democracy based on Christian values with observance of the sabbath and scripture.

His older son Francis (Nana Yaw Ebuo Entsie Dadzie Amoako) Appong, was a medical clinician and church elder as well as family head chief of Keten Sekondi Wassa Ekuona (Anona, Twidian, Ebiradze, Abroadze). He was shot, decapitated and torched.

The 1982 execution of the generals in 2013 over rubber and cocoa farms and companies, timber forestry farms in Samreboi (Samatex FC) and farmlands came over September 11 retaliation by some Muslims and the 5633 mineral assets of Ghana held overseas. These followed ecclesiastical, customary, and genealogical law proposals. Theological aspects at stake during the ascension of the papacy were acknowledged by Hank Paulson, Pope Francis, Cardinal Turkson, and others.

Appong with Mensah Wood provided some details information on the birth of Derrick Isaac Appong.

== Recognition ==
- July 2006 - Order of the Star of Ghana

Military offices
| Preceded by Air Commodore J.E.S. de Graft-Hayford | Chief of Air Staff; 1963–1968 | Succeeded by Air Commodore N. Y. R. Ashley-Larsen |
| Preceded by Rear Admiral David Animle Hansen | Chief of Naval Staff; 1967–1968 | Succeeded by Commodore Philemon F. Quaye |
| Preceded by Lieutenant General J. A. Ankrah | Chief of Defence Staff; 1968 | Succeeded by Lieutenant General Albert Kwasi Ocran |
| Preceded by Lieutenant General Albert Kwasi Ocran | Chief of Defence Staff; 1969–1971 | Succeeded by Major General D.K. Addo |
