= Maxwell Nagai =

Ghana air vice marshal and CAS

Air Vice Marshal Maxwell Mantsebi-Tei Nagai is a Ghanaian air force officer and serves in the Ghana Air Force. He is a former Chief of Air Staff of the Ghana Air Force.
