= Michael Samson-Oje =

Senior commander in Ghana Air Force (2016-2017)

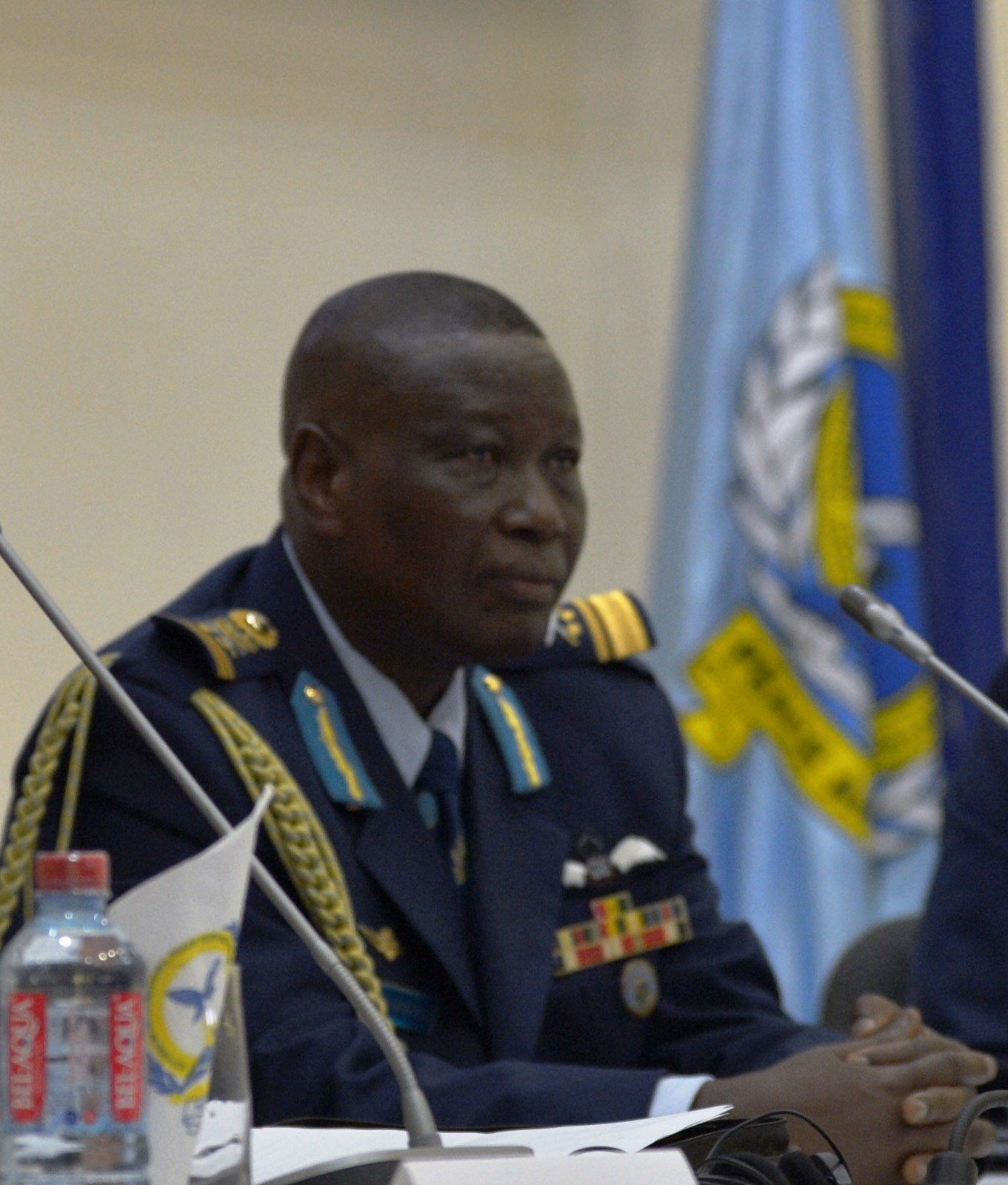
Samson-Oje at the USAF Regional African Air Chiefs Symposium in Accra.

Air Marshal Michael Samson-Oje (born 5 January 1954) was a senior commander in the Ghana Air Force and the Ghanaian Chief of Defence Staff between 2016 and 2017. Prior to that he was Chief of Air Staff. Before his appointment as Air Force chief, Samson-Oje was Station Commander of Takoradi Air Base.

Military offices
Preceded by Vice Admiral Quarshie	Chief of Defence Staff; 2016 – 2017	Succeeded by Lt. Gen. Akwa
