= John Asamoah Bruce =

Ghanaian Air Force Officer

Air Marshal John Asamoah Bruce was a Ghanaian air force personnel and served in the Ghana Air Force. He was the Chief of Air Staff of the Ghana Air Force from June 1992 to March 2001.
