= Charles Beausoliel =

Ghanaian air force personnel

Air Commodore Charles Beausoliel was a Ghanaian air force personnel and served in the Ghana Air Force. He was the Chief of Air Staff of the Ghana Air Force from January to December 1971.
