= F. W. K. Klutse =

Group Captain F. W. K. Klutse was a Ghanaian airman who served in the Ghana Air Force. He was the Chief of Air Staff of the Ghana Air Force from June 1979 to December 1979.
