= Chief of the Defence Staff (Ghana) =

Professional head of the Ghana Armed Forces

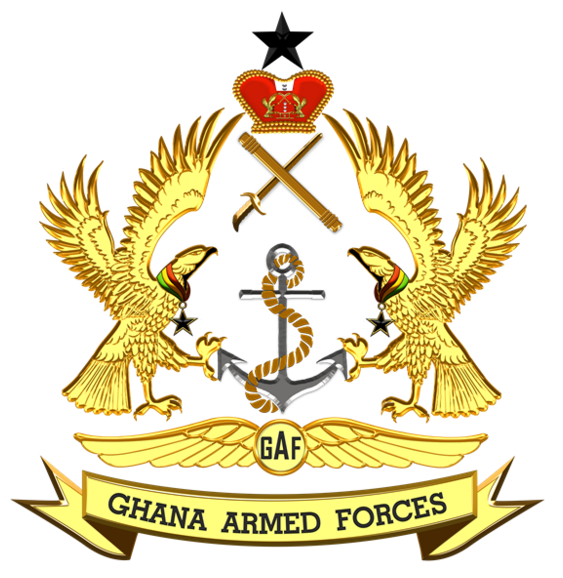
- Armed forces coat of arms
- Incumbent; Lieutenant General William Agyapong since 24 March 2025
- Ministry of Defence
- Style: Sir
- Abbreviation: CDS
- Member of: the Defence Staff
- Reports to: Minister of Defence
- Residence: Burma Camp, Greater Accra
- Appointer: President of Ghana in consultation with the Council of State of Ghana
- Constituting instrument: Constitution of Ghana (Article 214)
- Formation: 1954
- First holder: Alexander G. V. Paley
- Website: Official website

The Chief of the Defence Staff (CDS) is the professional head of the Ghana Armed Forces. He is thus responsible for the administration and the operational control and command of the Ghana military. The CDS is a member of the Armed Forces Council. This council advice the President of Ghana on matters of policy relating to defence and also regulates the administration of the Armed Forces. It also advises the President on the promotion of all officers above the rank of Lieutenant-Colonel or its equivalent.

The CDS is appointed by the President, in consultation with the Council of State of Ghana.

The current CDS is Lieutenant General William Agyapong. He was appointed by John Mahama in March 2025.

== History of the post ==
The Ghana Army was formed after World War II out of the Gold Coast Regiment of the Royal West African Frontier Force. The officer corps then was entirely European. It was modeled on the British Army. At independence in 1957, the highest ranking Ghanaian officer was a major. Major General A. G. V. Paley served as the General Officer Commanding the Ghana Regiment of Infantry which had succeeded the Gold Coast Regiment between 1957 and 1959. This position was effectively equivalent to Army commander as there was no Air Force or Navy.

The position of Chief of Defence Staff was first created in 1959 after the formation of the Ghana Navy and the Ghana Air Force. Major-General Henry Alexander was appointed as the first CDS though he effectively doubled as the Ghana Army commander as well. Since 1961, the position of army commander and CDS have been separate. The first native Ghanaian CDS was Major General S. J. A. Otu.

== Chiefs of the Defence Staff (1954–present) ==
The former heads of the Ghana Armed Forces were referred to while in office as either General Officers Commanding or Chiefs of the Defence Staff.

No.	Portrait	Chief of the Defence Staff	Took office	Left office	Time in office	Defence branch
1	Alexander G. V. Paley	Major General; Alexander G. V. Paley (1903–1976)	1954	11 January 1960	5–6 years	Ghana Army
2	Henry Templer Alexander CB, CBE, DSO	Major General; Henry Templer Alexander CB, CBE, DSO (1911–1977)	11 January 1960	September 1961	1 year, 7 months	Ghana Army
3	Stephen J. A. Otu	Major General; Stephen J. A. Otu (1915–1979) (First Ghanaian to be appointed CDS)	September 1961	24 July 1965	3 years	Ghana Army
4	Nathan A. Aferi	Major General; Nathan A. Aferi (1923–2003)	24 July 1965	24 February 1966	7 months	Ghana Army
5	Emmanuel Kwasi Kotoka	Lieutenant General; Emmanuel Kwasi Kotoka (1926–1967)	24 February 1966	17 April 1967 †	1 year, 52 days	Ghana Army
6	Joseph Arthur Ankrah	Lieutenant General; Joseph Arthur Ankrah (1915–1992)	17 April 1967	March 1968	10 months	Ghana Army
7	Michael Akuoko Otu OSG	Air Marshal; Michael Akuoko Otu OSG (1925–2006)	March 1968	November 1968	8 months	Ghana Air Force
8	Albert Kwesi Ocran	Lieutenant General; Albert Kwesi Ocran (1929–2019)	November 1968	November 1969	1 year	Ghana Army
(7)	Michael Akuoko Otu OSG	Air Marshal; Michael Akuoko Otu OSG (1925–2006)	November 1969	June 1971	1 year, 7 months	Ghana Air Force
9	Daniel K. Addo	Major General; Daniel K. Addo	June 1971	January 1972	7 months	Ghana Army
10	Napoleon Yaovi R. Ashley-Lassen	Air Vice-Marshal; Napoleon Yaovi R. Ashley-Lassen (born 1934)	January 1972	December 1974	2 years, 11 months	Ghana Air Force
11	Lawrence A. Okai	Major General; Lawrence A. Okai (1934–2017)	December 1974	November 1976	1 year, 11 months	Ghana Army
12	Fred Akuffo	Lieutenant General; Fred Akuffo (1937–1979)	November 1976	5 July 1978	1 year, 8 months	Ghana Army
13	Robert Kotei	Major General; Robert Kotei (1935–1979)	5 July 1978	23 July 1978	18 days	Ghana Army
14	Joshua Hamidu	Lieutenant General; Joshua Hamidu (1936–2021)	23 July 1978	4 June 1979	316 days	Ghana Army
15	E. D. F. Prah	Colonel; E. D. F. Prah	4 June 1979	7 July 1979	33 days	Ghana Army
16	Joseph Nunoo-Mensah	Brigadier; Joseph Nunoo-Mensah (born 1939)	7 July 1979	27 November 1979	143 days	Ghana Army
17	Edwin Kwamina Sam	Major General; Edwin Kwamina Sam (born 1940)	27 November 1979	6 December 1979	9 days	Ghana Army
18	John E. Odaate-Barnor	Air Vice-Marshal; John E. Odaate-Barnor (1937–2012)	7 December 1979	31 December 1981	2 years, 24 days	Ghana Air Force
(16)	Joseph Nunoo-Mensah	Brigadier; Joseph Nunoo-Mensah (born 1939)	1 January 1982	23 November 1982	326 days	Ghana Army
19	Jerry Rawlings	Flight Lieutenant; Jerry Rawlings (1947–2020)	28 November 1982	25 August 1983	270 days	Ghana Air Force
20	Arnold Quainoo	Lieutenant General; Arnold Quainoo (1939–2024)	25 August 1983	22 September 1989	6 years, 28 days	Ghana Army
21	Winston Mensa-Wood	Lieutenant General; Winston Mensa-Wood (1940–1992)	4 June 1990	21 March 1992	1 year, 291 days	Ghana Army
22	Achilles Harry Kwami Dumashie	Air Marshal; Achilles Harry Kwami Dumashie (1938–2002)	22 March 1992	1 October 1996	4 years, 193 days	Ghana Air Force
23	Ben K. Akafia	Lieutenant General; Ben K. Akafia (born 1940)	1 October 1996	February 2001	4 years, 4 months	Ghana Army
24	Seth Kofi Obeng	Lieutenant General; Seth Kofi Obeng (born 1945)	February 2001	28 February 2005	4 years	Ghana Army
25	Joseph Boateng Danquah	Lieutenant General; Joseph Boateng Danquah (born 1947)	20 February 2005	28 January 2009	3 years, 343 days	Ghana Army
–	A. R. S. Nunoo	Rear Admiral; A. R. S. Nunoo; Acting	28 January 2009	31 March 2009	62 days	Ghana Navy
26	Peter A. Blay	Lieutenant General; Peter A. Blay	31 March 2009	28 March 2013	3 years, 362 days	Ghana Army
27	Matthew Quashie	Vice Admiral; Matthew Quashie (1951–2020)	28 March 2013	5 January 2016	2 years, 283 days	Ghana Navy
28	Michael Samson-Oje	Air Marshal; Michael Samson-Oje (born 1954)	5 January 2016	9 February 2017	1 year, 35 days	Ghana Air Force
29	Obed Akwa	Lieutenant General; Obed Akwa (born 1955)	9 February 2017	5 February 2021	3 years, 362 days	Ghana Army
30	Seth Amoama	Vice Admiral; Seth Amoama (born 1959)	5 February 2021	31 January 2024	5 years, 214 days	Ghana Navy
31	Thomas Oppong-Peprah	General; Thomas Oppong-Peprah	1 February 2024	24 March 2025	1 year, 51 days	Ghana Army
32	William Agyapong	Major General; William Agyapong	24 March 2025	Incumbent	1 year, 167 days	Ghana Army

== See also ==
- Ghana Army
- Ghana Air Force
- Ghana Navy
