= Ian Gundry-White =

Royal Air Force officer

- Born: 21 December 1918
- Died: 15 September 1961 (aged 42)
- Military career
- Allegiance: United Kingdom
- Branch: Royal Air Force
- Service years: 1937–1961
- Rank: Wing Commander
- Commands: Chief of Air Staff Ghana (1960–61); No. 101 Squadron RAF (1945–46)
- Conflicts: Second World War
- Awards: Distinguished Flying Cross; King's Commendation for Valuable Service in the Air

Ian Malcolm Gundry-White, DFC (21 December 1918 – 15 September 1961) was a Royal Air Force officer of the Second World War and Cold War period, who served as the Chief of Air Staff of the Ghana Air Force from September 1960 to March 1961.
