= Joseph Nunoo-Mensah =

Ghanaian soldier

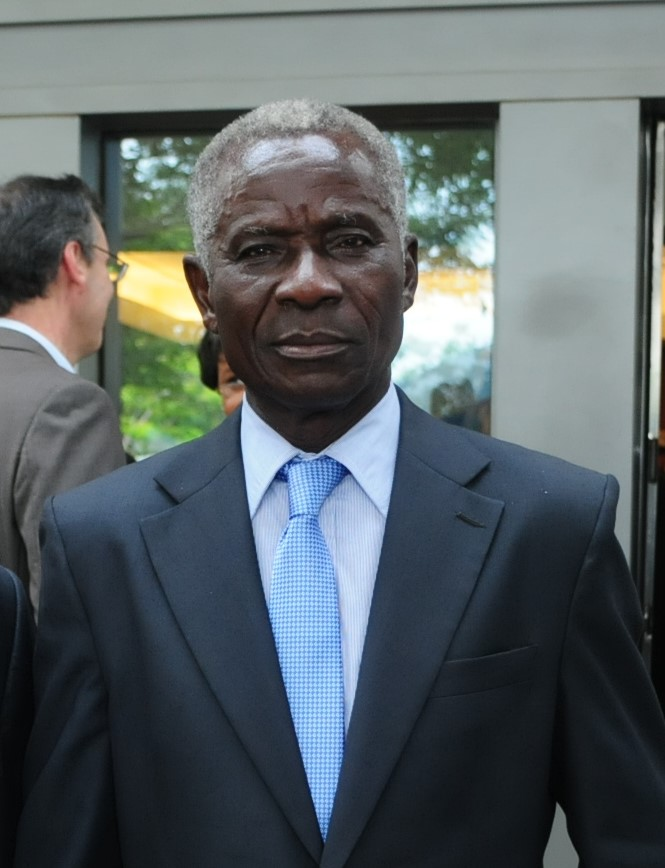
- Portrait of Brigadier Rtd. Joseph Nunoo-Mensah
- Born: 14 February 1939 (age 87); Winneba, Ghana
- Military career
- Allegiance: Ghana
- Branch: Ghana Army
- Service years: 1961 – 1982
- Rank: Brigadier
- Commands: Chief of Defence Staff
- Other work: Member of Provisional National Defence Council government. Chief Security Advisor to the President of Ghana.

Brigadier Joseph Nunoo-Mensah (born 14 February 1939) is a Ghanaian soldier and politician. He is a former Chief of Defence Staff of the Ghana Armed Forces. He was also a member of the Provisional National Defence Council government which overthrew the government of Dr. Hilla Limann in 1981.

== Early life and education ==
Nunoo-Mensah was born at Winneba in the Central Region of Ghana in 1939. He received his basic education at the Winneba Presbyterian Primary School and Winneba Methodist Middle School between 1945 and 1954. His secondary education was at the Ghana Secondary School, also at Winneba.

== Career ==
Nunoo-Mensah enlisted with the Ghana Military Academy in 1961.

Brigadier Nunoo-Mensah was appointed Chief of Defence Staff by the Armed Forces Revolutionary Council government in 1979. Nunoo-Mensah was retired in November 1979 by the People's National Party government of Dr. Limann.

== Politics ==
Nunoo-Mensah was appointed a member of the PNDC on 2 January 1982. He however resigned in November 1982 over differences with Rawlings. He was a member of the New Patriotic Party. He was the campaign manager for Nana Addo Dankwa Akufo-Addo's bid for nomination as the party's candidate for the Ghanaian presidential elections in 1998.

Nunoo-Mensah later defected from the New Patriotic Party (NPP) to the National Democratic Congress (NDC), then in opposition. He and a number of former military and police capos were banned from all military and police installations by the ruling NPP government after they had attended a lunch meeting with former President Flt. Lt. J.J. Rawlings.

Nunoo-Mensah was very instrumental in the campaign of the opposition NDC in the December 2008 elections in Ghana. In 2009, after the party won the elections he was made the National Security Advisor to the then newly elected president, John Evans Atta Mills of the NDC.

Military offices
Preceded by Colonel E. D. F. Prah	Chief of the Defence Staff; 1979	Succeeded by Major General Edwin K. Sam
Preceded by Air Vice-Marshal J. E. Odaate - Barnor	Chief of the Defence Staff; 1982	Succeeded by Flight Lieutenant Jerry Rawlings
