= Ghana Air Force =

Air warfare branch of Ghana's military

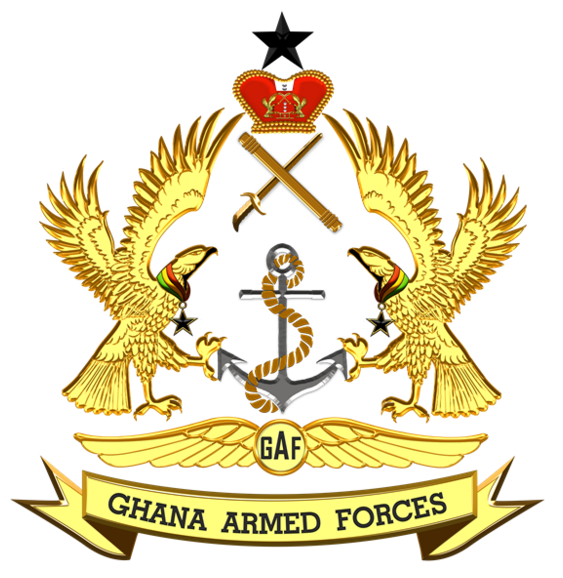
- Ghana Armed Forces emblem
- Founded: 29 July 1959; 67 years ago
- Country: Ghana
- Type: Air force
- Role: Aerial warfare
- Size: 18 aircraft
- Part of: Ghana Armed Forces
- Headquarters: Burma Camp
- Colours
- Engagements: First Liberian Civil War; Second Ivorian Civil War; Mali War

Insignia
- Roundel

- Fin flash

Aircraft flown
- Patrol: Diamond DA42 Twin Star
- Trainer: Hongdu K-8 Karakorum
- Transport: EADS CASA C-295

The Ghana Air Force (GHF) is the aerial warfare organizational military branch of the Ghanaian Armed Forces (GAF). The GHF, along with the Ghanaian army (GA) and Ghanaian navy (GN), make up the Ghanaian Armed Forces (GAF), which are controlled by the Ghanaian Ministry of Defence (MoD).

== History ==
The GHF (Ghana Air Force) started on 24 July 1959 as a Flying Training School with Israeli instructors and technicians, under the command of Lt. Col. Adam Shatkay of the IAF (Israeli Air Force). The School was established as a cradle of a service to complement the Army and the Navy. Later that year a headquarters was established in Accra under the command of Indian Air commodore K. Jaswant-Singh who was appointed as the first Chief of Air Staff (CAS). In 1960 Royal Air Force personnel took up the task of training the newly established Ghana Air Force and in 1961 they were joined by a small group of Royal Canadian Air Force personnel. In September 1961 as part of President Kwame Nkrumah's Africanization program, a Ghanaian CAS was appointed, with the first being J.E.S. de Graft-Hayford, born in the U.K. of Ghanaian descent.

The Ghana Air Force was in the beginning equipped with a squadron of Chipmunk trainers, and squadrons of Beavers, Otters and Caribou transport aircraft. In addition a DH125 jet was bought for Kwame Nkrumah, Hughes helicopters were bought for mosquito spraying plus DH Doves and Herons. British-made Westland Whirlwind helicopters and a squadron of Italian-made MB-326 ground attack/trainer jets were also purchased.

In 1962 the national School of Gliding was set up by Hanna Reitsch, who was once Adolf Hitler's top personal pilot. Under the command of Air Commodore de Graft-Hayford, she served as director, operations instructor and trainer of the school. She also acted as the personal pilot of Kwame Nkrumah from 1962 to 1966.

Current day, the air force has been advancing evacuation capabilities in Ghana through the US-Ghanaian partnership.

== Organisation ==
The GHF headquarters is located at Burma Camp and the main transport airfield is the Air Force Base Accra, which shares the same runway with the Accra International Airport. Other GHF airfields include:

- Air Force Base Tamale, which shares its runway with the Tamale International Airport.
- GHF Air Force Station Sekondi-Takoradi started as RAF Station Takoradi, then became Ghana Air Force Station Sekondi-Takoradi on 1 March 1961. The Chipmunk Basic Trainer Aircraft was the first aircraft used at the Station with an all Rank Air Force Station.
- GHF Air Force station Accra came into being soon after the Royal Air Force (RAF) had taken over the administration from the Indian and Israeli Air Force officers at the beginning of 1961. The station was housed at No 3 hangar at the Accra Airport (Accra International Airport) with hardly any aircraft. The Unit had four main sub-units, i.e. the Administration Wing, Flying Wing, Technical Wing and Equipment Wing. The School of Technical Training was also located at this station. The Station moved from No 3 hangar to its present location in Burma Camp towards the end of 1965.

== Mission ==
The role of the Ghana Air Force, as defined in the National Defence Policy, is to provide "Air Transport and Offensive Air Support to the Ghana Armed Forces and to protect the territorial air space of Ghana". The National Defense Policy states certain specific tasks which the Ghana Air Force is expected to perform:

- To maintain Fighter Ground Attack capability and provide Close Air Support during operation.
- To provide transport support to the Ghana Armed Forces.
- To provide surveillance over the air space of Ghana and over the Exclusive Economic Zone (EEZ).
- To provide liaison and recce flight capability.
- To provide VIP flight capability.
- To provide transport support for civilians as government directs.
- To provide medical evacuation and air rescue assistance.

The Ghana Air Force is also responsible for the co-ordination and direction of Search and Rescue (SAR) within the Accra Flight Information Region.

== Aircraft ==
=== Active inventory ===
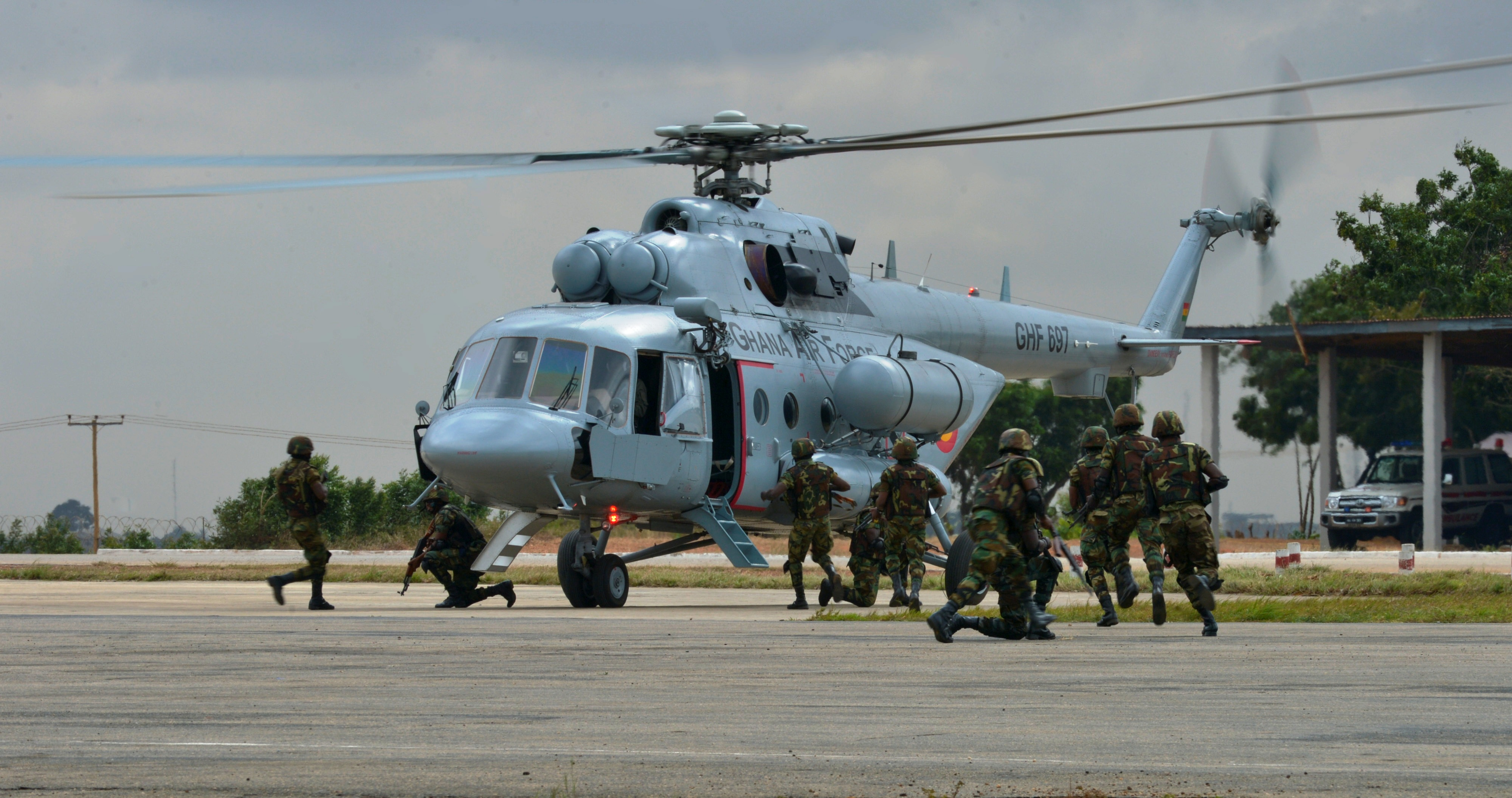
A Ghanaian special forces team board a Mi-17 helicopter

Aircraft	Origin	Type	Variant	In service	Notes
Reconnaissance
Diamond DA42	Austria	Surveillance		2	
Transport
CASA C-295	Spain	Transport / Utility		2	
Dassault Falcon 6X	France	Presidential Transport			1 on order.
Helicopters
Airbus H175	Spain	Utility / VIP Transport	2 H175M, 1 ACH175	1	2 on order.
Airbus H160	Spain	VIP Transport	ACH160		1 on order.
Mil Mi-24	Russia	Attack	Mi-35		1 on order
Mil Mi-17	Russia	Transport / Utility	Mi-17/171	5	1 damaged 19 March 2024.
Bell 412	United States	Utility		1	
Harbin Z-9	China	Utility		3	1 crashed 6 August 2025.
Trainer aircraft
Hongdu K-8	China	Jet trainer		4	
Diamond DA42	Austria	Multi-engine trainer		1	

In 2024 a Fokker F27 Friendship with Ghana Air Force fin flash can be seen at Accra Air Base.

=== Aircraft acquisitions ===
Ghana Air Force has considered Embraer EMB 314, a COIN or light attack aircraft from Brazil. At one time, around 2015, 5 were on order but the deal did not close and no aircraft were acquired by Ghana. As of 2024, EMB 314 was still under consideration of being acquired by Ghana Air Force but no deal has been made.

The Ghana Air Force has also considered acquiring Aero L-39NG jet trainer (or light combat aircraft) from Czech Republic. 6 were on order in 2021 but in 2024 the acquisition was described as stalled.

Ghana’s Ministry of Defence has signed a contract with Airbus Helicopters for four aircraft: two H175M military helicopters, one ACH175 and one ACH160. The agreement was announced on January 15 (2026). The two H175M helicopters will be used in multi-mission roles, including transport, search and rescue, medical evacuation and disaster relief. The ACH175 and ACH160 will be operated in transport roles, including government and VIP missions. “The H175M will be operated in Ghana across defence and security missions,” said Arnaud Montalvo, head of Africa and the Middle East at Airbus Helicopters, in a brief statement accompanying the announcement.

=== Retired ===
Previous notable aircraft operated were the Aermacchi MB-339, MB-326, DHC-4 Caribou, Fokker F27 Friendship, de Havilland Heron, Short Skyvan, BN-2 Islander, Beagle Husky, DHC-3 Otter, DHC-2 Beaver, Cessna 172, Bell 212, Westland Wessex, Aérospatiale Alouette III, Mil Mi-2, Scottish Aviation Bulldog, DHC-1 Chipmunk, L-29 Delfín, HAL HT-2 and the Aero L-39ZO.

== Chiefs of Air Staff ==
The senior appointment in the GHF is the Chief of Air Staff. The following is a list of the Ghana Air Force Chiefs of Air Staff:

GHF Chiefs of Air Staff
Chief of Air Staff	Conscription	Note
Air Commodore K. Jaswant-Singh	May 1959 – August 1960	Indian
Wing Commander I. M. Gundry-White	September 1960 – March 1961	British
Air Commodore John N. H. Whitworth	March 1961 – September 1962	British
Air Commodore J.E.S. de Graft-Hayford	September 1962 – July 1963	First Ghanaian CAS
Air Vice-Marshal Michael Otu	July 1963 – March 1968	
Air Commodore N. Y. R. Ashley-Larsen	March 1968 – January 1971	
Air Commodore Charles Beausoliel	January 1971 – December 1971	
Air Commodore N. Y. R. Ashley-Larsen	December 1971 – January 1972	
Air Commodore Charles Beausoliel	December 1972 – November 1976	
Air Vice Marshal George Yaw Boakye	November 1976 – June 1979	
Wing Commander Samuel Gyabaah	June 1979 – July 1979	
Group Captain F. W. K. Klutse	July 1979 – December 1979	
Air Commodore J. E. Odaate- Barnor	December 1979 – May 1980	
Air Commodore K. K. Pumpuni	May 1980 – January 1982	
Group Captain E. A. A. Awuviri	January 1982 – December 1982	
Air Vice Marshal J. E. A. Kotei	December 1982 – June 1988	
Air Marshal Harry Dumashie	June 1988 – June 1992	
Air Marshal John Asamoah Bruce	5 June 92 – February 2001 (? – 16 March 2001)	
Air Vice Marshal Edward Apau Mantey	February 2001 – January 2005	
Air Vice Marshal Julius Otchere Boateng	20 May 2005 – to 28 January 2009	
Air Vice Marshal M. Samson-Oje	31 March 2009 – January 2016	
Air Vice Marshal Maxwell Mantsebi-Tei Nagai	January 2016 – January 2019	
Air Vice Marshal Frank Hanson	January 2019 – January 2023	
Air Vice Marshal Frederick Asare Bekoe	January 2023 – March 2025	

== Rank structure ==
The GHF's rank structure is similar to the RAF's rank structure from where its ranks were derived.

Commissioned officers

Rank group	General / flag officers				Senior officers			Junior officers
Ghana Air Force
Ghana Air Force	Air chief marshal	Air marshal	Air vice-marshal	Air commodore	Group captain	Wing commander	Squadron leader	Flight lieutenant	Flying officer	Pilot officer

Enlisted

Rank group	Senior NCOs				Junior NCOs	Enlisted
Ghana Air Force							No insignia
Ghana Air Force	Warrant officer class I	Warrant officer class II	Flight sergeant	Sergeant	Corporal	Leading aircraftsman	Aircraftsman
