= Veterans Association of Ghana =

Organization in Ghana

The Veterans Association of Ghana is an association of former servicemen and women of the Gold Coast Regiment and the Ghana Armed Forces.

It started originally as the Gold Coast Legion was formed in 1944 as a branch of what was then known as the British Empire Services League. It is now the Royal Commonwealth Ex-Services League. The first patron of the association was the Governor Sir Alan Burns. It became the Ghana Legion on the Gold Coast attaining its independence from the United Kingdom.

The legal basis of the association is currently bound by a 1974 decree of the National Redemption Council, the NRCD 285. There are currently proposals for its overhaul but these are still in the discussion stages. Nonetheless, VAG formerly known as Veterans Association of Ghana is now Veterans Administration of Ghana

== External source ==
- VAG on Ghana Military website
