= List of MPs elected in the 1969 Ghanaian parliamentary election =

Colonial Era
1951 Assembly	(election)
1954 Assembly	(election)
1956 Assembly	(election)
First Republic
1957 Parliament	(election)
1965 Parliament	(election)
Second Republic
1969 Parliament	(election)
Third Republic
1979 Parliament	(election)
Fourth Republic
1st Parliament	(1992)
2nd Parliament	(1996)
3rd Parliament	(2000)
4th Parliament	(2004)
5th Parliament	(2008)
6th Parliament	(2012)
7th Parliament	(2016)
8th Parliament	(2020)
9th Parliament	(2024)

The election of Members of Parliament (MPs) to the Parliament of the Second Republic was held on 29 August 1969.

== Seats composition ==
Affiliation	Members
Progress Party (PP)	105
National Alliance of Liberals (NAL)	29
United Nationalist Party (UNP)	2
People's Action Party (PAP)	2
All People's Republican Party (APRP)	1
Independent (Ind)	1
Total	140
Government Majority	70

== List of MPs elected in the general election ==
The following table is a list of MPs elected on 29 August 1969, ordered by region and constituency.

Table of contents:

Ashanti Region • Brong Ahafo Region • Central Region • Eastern Region • Greater Accra Region
Northern Region • Upper Region • Volta Region • Western Region
Postponed polls • Changes • By-elections • Notes and References • See also • External links and sources

=== Ashanti Region - 22 seats ===
Constituency	Elected MP	Elected Party	Majority
Adansi	Stephen Nuamah Mensah	PP	
Afigya-Kwabre	Akenten Appiah-Menka	PP	
Agona-Kwabre	Victor Owusu	PP	
Ahafo-Ano	Hanson Matthew Adjei-Sarpong	PP	
Amansie East	Kwabena Adu-Kyei	PP	
Amansie Central	Kwame Poku Agyekum	PP	
Amansie West	Ohene Buabeng	PP	
Asante-Akim North	Emmanuel Kwasi Addae	PP	
Asante-Akim South	Nicholas Yaw Boafo Adade	PP	
Asokwa	K.G. Osei Bonsu	PP	
Atwima-Amansie	Kofi Gyenfi II	PP	
Atwima-Mponua	Benjamin Kwaku Owusu	PP	
Atwima Nwabiagya	John Kufuor	PP	
Bantama	Walter Horace Kofi-Sackey	PP	
Ejisu-Juaben	Kwame Agyei Boaitey	PP	
Mampong North	Reginald Reynolds Amponsah	PP	
Mampong South	Joseph Yaw Manu	PP	
Manhyia	Dr. Kwame Safo-Adu	PP	
Obuasi	Justice Akuamoa Boateng	PP	
Offinso	Yaw Brefo Darkwa-Dwamena	PP	
Sekyere	Kingsley Abayie	PP	
Subin	Dr. Thomas Kwame Aboagye	PP	
=== Brong Ahafo Region - 13 seats ===
Constituency	Elected MP	Elected Party	Majority
Asunafo	Alfred Badu-Nkansah	PP	
Asutifi	Isaiah Kwaku Osei-Duah	PP	
Atebubu	Edward Kofi Nkansah	PP	
Berekum	Samuel Hene Addae	PP	
Dormaa	Dr. Solomon Anso Manson	PP	
Jaman	Michael Kwame Attah	PP	
Kwame Danso	Joseph Anim-Danso	PP	
Nkoransa	Ofresu Kwabena Poku	PP	
Sunyani	Joseph Henry Mensah	PP	
Tano	Anane Antwi Kusi	PP	
Techiman	Akumfi Ameyaw Munufie	PP	
Wenchi East	Kofi Abrefa Busia	PP	
Wenchi West	Joseph Kofi Amankwah	PP	
=== Central Region - 15 seats ===
Constituency	Elected MP	Elected Party	Majority
Abura	Dr. John Kofi Fynn	PP	
Agona	Joseph Addison Anyan	PP	
Ajumako-Breman-Enyan	Duke Joseph Banson	PP	
Asikuma-Brakwa	Kweku Sekyi-Appiah	PP	
Assin	Isaac Amissah-Aidoo	PP	
Awutu-Effutu-Senya	Haruna Esseku	PP	
Cape Coast	T.D. Brodie Mends	PP	
Denkyira	Charles Omar Nyanor	PP	
Ekumfi	Kobina Sekyi-Amua	PP	
Gomoa-Akyempim	Oheneba Kow Aduako Richardson	PP	
Gomoa-Assin-Ajumako	Frank Abor Essel-Cobbah	PP	
Komenda-Edina-Eguafo-Abrem	Samuel Kobina Casely Osei-Baidoo	PP	
Mfantsiman-Sebu	James Davies-Quakyi	PP	
Swedru-Nyakrom-Nkum	Joseph Godson Amamoo	PP	
Twifu-Heman-Denkyira	Victor Kofi Aidoo	PP	
=== Eastern Region - 22 seats ===
Constituency	Elected MP	Elected Party	Majority
Abetifi	Emmanuel Kwadwo Adu	PP	
Abuakwa	Gibson Dokyi Ampaw	PP	
Nsawam-Aburi	Ebenezer Theophilus Odartei Ayeh	PP	
Afram	Benjamin Benson Ofori	PP	
Akropong	Alexander Abu Abedi	PP	
Asamankese	Alexander Apeatu Aboagye da Costa	PP	
Asiakwa-Kwaben	George Oteng	PP	
Akwatia	William Ofori Atta	PP	
Begoro	Jones Ofori Atta	PP	
Birim-Abirem	Solomon Osei-Akoto	PP	
Birim-Anafo	Kwabena Kwakye Anti	PP	
Dangbe-Shai	Jonathan Tetteh Ofei	NAL	
Densuagya	Nana Toa-Akwatia II	PP	
Kade	Kwaku Bugyei Ntim	PP	
Koforidua	Michael Kwasi Osei	PP	
Krobo	Richard Kwaku Osei	NAL	
Manya	E. R. T. Madjitey (Leader of the Opposition)	NAL	
Mid-Volta	Isaac Emmanuel Osei-Bonsu	PP	
Nkawkaw	Kwaku Baah	PP	
Oda	Samuel Benson Adjepong	PP	
Suhum	Samuel Wilberforce Awuku-Darko	PP	
Yilo-Osudoku	George Tetteh Odonkor	NAL	
=== Greater Accra Region - 9 seats ===
Constituency	Elected MP	Elected Party	Majority
Ada	Emmanuel Kabutey Narter-Olaga	NAL	
Ablekuma	Clarkson Thomas Nylander	NAL	
Ashiedu-Keteke	Henry Satorius Bannerman	UNP	
Ayawaso	Ibrahim Cudjoe Quaye	PP	
Ga	Alex Hutton-Mills	UNP	
Kpeshie	George Adjei Osekre	PP	
Okaikwei	Carl Daniel Reindorf	PP	
Osu-Klottey	Henry Romulus Sawyerr	Ind	
Tema	William Godson Bruce-Konuah	PP	
=== Northern Region - 14 seats ===
Constituency	Elected MP	Elected Party	Majority
Bunkpurugu	Jatong Silim Sambian	PP	
Gonja Central	Joseph Bukari Alhassan	PP	
Gonja East	Joseph Kwesi Mbimadong	NAL	
Gonja West	James Adam Mahama	PP	
Gushiegu	Seth Adam Ziblim	NAL	
Mion-Nanton	Yisifu Yinusah	NAL	
Nalerigu	Daniel Abdulai Bayensi	PP	
Nanumba	Zakari Ziblim	PP	
Chereponi Saboba	Ernest Seth Yaney	PP	
Savelugu	Abdulai Yakubu	NAL	
Tamale	Ibrahim Mahama	NAL	
Tolon	Ben Abdulai Yakubu-Tali	PP	
Walewale	Mohammed Abdul-Saaka	PP	
Yendi	Shanni Hazrat Mahama	PP	
=== Upper Region -16 seats ===
Constituency	Elected MP	Elected Party	Majority
Bawku East	Adam Amandi	PP	
Bawku West	Daniel Ayamdo Ayagiba	NAL	
Bolgatanga	James Ben Kaba	PP	
Bongo	Azabiri Ayamga	PP	
Chiana-Paga	Catherine Katuni Tedam^{a}	PP	
Tempane-Garu	Idana Asigri	PP	
Jirapa/Lambussie District	Simon Diedong Dombo	PP	
Lawra-Nandom	Sylvester Emmanuel Sanziri	PP	
Nadowli	Jatoe Kaleo	PP	
Navrongo	Joseph Evarisi Seyire	PP	
Sandema	Lydia Azuele Akanbodiipo^{b}	NAL	
Talensi-Nabdam	Mosobila Kpamma	PP	
Tumu	Edwin Kyige Mumuni Dimbie	PP	
Wa East	James Nagra Momori	PP	
Wa	Bukari Adama	PP	
Zebilla	Ayamba Atia	NAL	
=== Volta Region - 16 seats ===
Constituency	Elected MP	Elected Party	Majority
Akan	Stephen Kwadwo Osei-Nyame	NAL	
Anlo	Richard Tetteh Segla	NAL	
Avenor	Frederick Percival Segbefia	NAL	
Biakoye	Obed Yao Asamoah	NAL	
Buem	Christopher Kwaku Nayo	NAL	
Dzodze	Bliss Ackuaku	NAL	
East Dayi	Daniel Kwasi Avoke	NAL	
Ho East	Komla Dotse Akude	NAL	
Ho West	Felix Kwasi Adinyira	NAL	
Keta	Albert Gregorio De Souza	NAL	
Krachi	Benard Kwaku Mensah	PP	
Nkwanta	Robert Kwame Mensah	PP	
North Tongu	Samuel Awuku Okudzeto	NAL	
Some-Aflao	Joseph Yao Dziwornu-Mensah	NAL	
South Tongu	Godfreid Kportufe Agama	NAL	
West Dayi	Theodore Kodjo Agadzi	NAL	
=== Western Region - 13 seats ===
Constituency	Elected MP	Elected Party	Majority
Ahanta	Richard Abusua-Yedom Quarshie	PP	
Amenfi	Patrick Kwame Kusi Quaidoo	APRP	
Aowin	David Kojo Duku	PP	
Bibiani	Isaac Lawrence Kumaning Mensah	PP	
Nzema West	Francis Asuah Amalemah	PAP	
Nzema East	Timothy Amihere Mensah	PAP	
Sefwi Wiawso	Sebastian Kwaku Opon	PP	
Sekondi	J. Kwesi Lamptey	PP	
Shama	Benjamin Edwin Quansah	PP	
Takoradi	Saki Scheck	PP	
Takwa	Charles Kwamina Tachie	PP	
Wassa East	Matthew Archer	PP	
Wassa West	Stephen Krakue	PP	

== Notes ==
- ^a Catherine Tedam (Sandemaa) was one of only two women represented in the parliament.
- ^b Lydia Akandodipo (Chiana) was one of only two women represented in the parliament.

== See also ==
- 1969 Ghanaian parliamentary election
- Parliament of Ghana
- Nii Amaa Ollennu - Speaker of the Parliament of the 2nd Republic.
