= Matthew Archer =

Ghanaian politician (born 1931)

Member of parliament for Wassa East Constituency
- In office 1969–1972
- President: Edward Akufo-Addo
- Prime Minister: Kofi Abrefa Busia

Personal details
- Born: 6 June 1931 Gold Coast
- Education: University of Birmingham

Matthew Archer (born 6 June 1931) is a Ghanaian politician who was the member of parliament for the Wassa East constituency in the first Parliament of the Second Republic of Ghana. He represented the Progress Party.

== Early life and education ==
Archer was born on 6 June 1931 in the then Gold Coast currently called Ghana. He obtained a Bachelor of Laws degree from the University of Birmingham, Gibson Weldon College of Law.

== Career ==
Archer was a lawyer by profession.

== Politics ==
Archer was elected to the first Parliament of the Second Republic of Ghana in the 1969 Ghanaian parliamentary election. He was elected to represent the Wassa East constituency. While in parliament he was a member of the Parliamentary Selection Committee. He was on the same committee with Mr B. K. Adama -the Chairman of the committee; and other members of parliament namely; Mr. Kinsley Abeyie, Mr. Amua-Sekyi, Mr. E. T. O. Oyeh and Mr. K. A. Boaitey.

=== 1969 Elections ===
Archer was elected after polling 6,643 votes out of 8,614 total valid votes cast during the 1969 Ghanaian parliamentary election. He was elected over James Gyimah Amoo of the APRP, Jimah Moses Kofi of the NAL and Joseph Kwamena Sapmpson of the PAP.

== Personal life ==
Archer is a Christian.
