= Daniel Abdulai Bayensi =

Ghanaian politician

Member of the Ghana Parliament for Nalerigu
- In office 1969–1972
- President: Edward Akufo-Addo
- Prime Minister: Kofi Abrefa Busia

Personal details
- Born: 10 May 1940 (age 86)
- Education: Nalerigu Middle School and Tamale Government Secondary
- Occupation: Journalist

Daniel Abdulai Bayensi (born 10 May 1940) is a Ghanaian politician and member of the first parliament of the second republic of Ghana representing Nalerigu constituency in the Northern Region of Ghana under the membership of the Progress Party (PP).

== Early life and education ==
Bayensi was born on 10 May 1940. He attended Nalerigu Middle School and Tamale Government Secondary where he obtained a G.C.E ordinary level and diploma respectively in Journalism and later worked as a journalist before going into Parliament.

== Politics ==
Bayensi begun his political career in 1969 when he became the parliamentary candidate to represent his constituency; Nalerigu in the Northern Region of Ghana prior to the commencement of the 1969 Ghanaian parliamentary election.

He was sworn into office as a member of the First Parliament of the Second Republic of Ghana on 1 October 1969, after being pronounced winner at the 1969 Ghanaian election held on 26 August 1969. His tenure of office ended on 13 January 1972.

== Personal life ==
Bayensi is a Christian.
