= Stephen Nuamah Mensah =

Ghanaian politician (born 1914)

Member of the Ghana Parliament for Adansi
- In office 1969–1972
- President: Edward Akufo-Addo
- Prime Minister: Kofi Abrefa Busia
- Preceded by: John Young Ghann
- Succeeded by: Samuel Asante-Fosuhene

Personal details
- Born: Stephen Nuamah Mensah; 14 August 1914 Fomena, Adansi, Ashanti Region, Gold Coast
- Education: Bennett College, London

Stephen Nuamah Mensah (born 14 August 1914, date of death unknown) was a Ghanaian politician and member of the first parliament of the second republic of Ghana representing Adansi constituency under the membership of the progress party (PP).

== Early life and education ==
Stephen Mensah was born on 14 August 1914. He attended Bennett College, London where he obtained his Diploma in Secretaryship. He worked as a timber merchant before going into Parliament.

== Politics ==
Mensah entered parliament in 1969, after winning the Adansi parliamentary seat during the 1969 parliamentary election on the ticket of the Progress Party (PP). During the election, he polled 7,812 votes against Kofi Badu of the National Alliance of Liberals (NAL) who polled 2,292 votes.

Mensah was sworn into the First Parliament of the Second Republic of Ghana on 1 October 1969, after being pronounced winner at the 1969 parliamentary election held on 26 August 1969.

== Personal life ==
Mensah was married with 13 children. His hobbies were gardening and reading.
