= George Tetteh Odonkor =

Ghanaian politician

MP for Yilo-Osudoku
- In office 1 October 1969 – 13 January 19972
- President: Kofi Abrefa Busia

Personal details
- Born: 26 May 1935 (age 91) Yilo-Osudoku, Eastern Region Gold Coast (now Ghana)
- Party: Progress Party
- Education: Wimbledon Technical College, London Guildhall University
- Occupation: Politician
- Profession: economist, lecturer

George Tetteh Odonkor (born 26 May 1935) is an economist, lecturer and politician of the Republic of Ghana. He was a member of the first parliament of the second Republic of Ghana, he represented Yilo-Osudoku Constituency under the membership of National Alliance of Liberals.

== Early life and education ==
Odonkor was born on 26 May 1935 in the Eastern Region of Ghana. He is an alumnus of Wimbledon Technical College in London which he attended in his early days. He further went to City of London College where he obtained his Bachelor of Science degree in economics to continue his academic pursuit. He is also an alumnus of the University of London and University of Reading where he obtained his Post-Graduate Diploma and Master of Science degree in agricultural economy Respectively.

== Political career ==
Odonkor contested the 1969 Ghanaian Parliamentary elections under the membership of National Alliance of Liberals to represent Yilo-Osudoku Constituency in the first Parliament of the second Republic of Ghana. He was sworn in as member of the Parliament on 1 October 1969 after emerging as the winner in the preceding election. His tenure ended and he left office on 13 January 1972 after the Parliament was dissolved.

== Personal life ==
He is Methodist Christian.

== See also ==
- List of MPs elected in the 1969 Ghanaian Parliamentary Elections
