= Hanson Matthew Adjei-Sarpong =

Ghanaian politician

Member of the Ghana Parliament for Ahafo Ano
- In office 1969–1972
- President: Edward Akufo-Addo
- Prime Minister: Kofi Abrefa Busia
- Preceded by: Constituency merged
- Succeeded by: Constituency merged

Personal details
- Born: Hanson Matthew Adjei-Sarpong; July 24, 1925 Asokore, New Juaben Municipal District, Gold Coast
- Education: Wesley College of Education, Kumasi

Hanson Matthew (24 July 1925 – 8 October 2000) was a Ghanaian politician and a member of the 1st parliament of the 2nd republic of Ghana, representing Ahafo Ano Constituency as a member of the Progress Party.

== Early life and education ==
He was born on 24 July 1925 at Asokore in the Eastern Region of Ghana (then Gold Coast). He had his secondary education at Mfantsipim School and proceeded to Wesley College where he obtained his Teachers' Training Certificate.

== Career ==
Adjei-Sarpong was a teacher by profession and a farmer. He was a member of the Ashant Regional Education Committee and owned a yam farm near Techiman in the then Brong Ahafo Region. He also served as the president of the Ahafo-Ano Cooperative Union from 1968 until his election into parliament.

== Politics ==
Adjei-Sarpong entered parliament in 1969, after winning the Ahafo-Ano parliamentary seat during the 1969 parliamentary election on the ticket of the Progress Party (PP). During the election, he polled 11,959 votes against George K. Annin-Adjei of the National Alliance of Liberals (NAL) who polled 2,268 votes. After being pronounced winner at the 1969 Ghanaian parliamentary election held on 26 August 1969, he was sworn into the First Parliament of the Second Republic of Ghana on 1 October 1969.
