= Ohene Buabeng =

Ghanaian politician and businessperson

Member of the Ghana Parliament for Amansie West
- In office 1 October 1969 – 13 January 1972
- President: Edward Akufo-Addo
- Prime Minister: Kofi Abrefa Busia
- Preceded by: Constituency merged
- Succeeded by: Joseph Kofi Obeng

Personal details
- Born: 24 August 1934 (age 92) Manso Mem, Ashanti Region, Gold Coast
- Education: Presbyterian College of Education; University of Ghana

Ohene Buabeng is a Ghanaian politician and member of the first parliament of the second republic of Ghana representing Amansie-West constituency under the membership of the Progress Party.

== Early life and education ==
Ohene was born on 24 August 1932 at Manso Mem, a town in the Ashanti Region of Ghana. He attended Presbyterian Training College (now Presbyterian College of Education, Akropong) where he obtained his Teachers' Training Certificate. He later proceeded to University of Ghana, Legon, Accra where he obtained his Diploma in Public Administration.

== Politics ==
Buabeng entered parliament in 1969, after winning the Amansie West parliamentary seat during the 1969 parliamentary election on the ticket of the Progress Party (PP). During the election, he polled 10,573 votes against Opoku Agyeman of the National Alliance of Liberals (NAL) who polled 718 votes.

He assumed office as a member of the first parliament of the second republic of Ghana on 1 October 1969 after being pronounced winner in the 1969 Ghanaian parliamentary election. His tenure of office in parliament ended on 13 January 1972.

== Career ==
Prior to entering parliament, Buabeng was an educationist.

== Personal life ==
Buabeng is a Christian. His hobbies are farming, refereeing, athletics, and weaving. He is married with eleven children, one deceased. Nana is also the traditional ruler of the Wirempe traditional area in the Ashanti Region. The region is made up of 22 settlements. Manso-Mem is the capital. Nana holds the title of Otumfuo Wirempehene, overseer of the Wirempe rituals that govern the transition from one Asante monarch to another.
