= Charles Kwamina Tachie =

Ghanaian politician

Member of parliament for Takwa Constituency
- In office 1969–1972
- President: Edward Akufo-Addo
- Prime Minister: Kofi Abrefa Busia

Personal details
- Born: Charles Kwamina Tachie Gold Coast
- Education: Tarkwa Roman Catholic School

Charles Kwamina Tachie is a Ghanaian politician and was the member of parliament for the Tarkwa constituency in the 1st parliament of the 2nd republic of Ghana.

== Early life and education ==
Tachie was born in 1920. He attended the Tarkwa Roman Catholic School.

== Career ==
Tachie worked as a Works Superintendent. He was also a businessman.

== Politics ==
Tachie was elected as the member of parliament to represent the Tarkwa constituency in the 1st parliament of the 2nd republic of Ghana. He was elected during the 1969 Ghanaian parliamentary election.

=== 1969 Elections ===
Tachie was elected with 4,197 votes out of 8,477 total valid votes cast. He was elected on the ticket of the Progress Party. He was elected over Rowland Atta Kesson of the National Alliance of Liberals and Christian Buah Olivet-Ackim of the People's Action Party. These obtained 1,155 and 3,125 respectively of the total valid votes cast.

== Personal life ==
Tachie is a Christian.
