= Benjamin Kwaku Owusu =

Ghanaian politician

Member of the Ghana Parliament for Atwima-Mponua
- In office 1969–1972
- President: Edward Akufo-Addo
- Prime Minister: Kofi Abrefa Busia
- Preceded by: Constituency split
- Succeeded by: Daniel Donkor

Personal details
- Born: 17 February 1917 (age 109) Twedieh, Ashanti Region, Gold Coast

Benjamin Kwaku Owusu is a Ghanaian politician and member of the first parliament of the second republic of Ghana. He was the member of parliament for the Atwima-Mponua constituency under the membership of the Progress Party from 1969 until 1972 when the Busia government was overthrown.

== Early life and education ==
Owusu was born on 17 February 1917 at Twedieh at town in the Kumasi Metropolis of the Ashanti Region of Ghana. He attended Presbyterian Training College now English Church Mission School, an elementary school in Kumasi. There he obtained his Elementary Standard Seven certificate in 1936.

== Career and politics ==
Owusu was an administrator, farmer, and ex-serviceman prior to entering parliament. He began his political career in 1969 when he became the parliamentary candidate for the Progress Party (PP) to represent Atwima-Mponua constituency prior to the commencement of the 1969 Ghanaian parliamentary election. He assumed office as a member of the first parliament of the second republic of Ghana on 1 October 1969 after being pronounced winner at the 1969 Ghanaian parliamentary election. His tenure ended on 13 January 1972.

== Personal life ==
Owusu was a Christian. He was married with ten children. His hobbies included playing lawn tennis and football.
