= Samuel Henne Addae =

Ghanaian politician (born 1929)

Member of the Ghana Parliament for Berekum
- Prime Minister: Kofi Abrefa Busia
- In office 1969–1972
- President: Edward Akufo-Addo

Personal details
- Born: 15 February 1929 Berekum, Brong-Ahafo Region, Gold Coast
- Education: University of Ghana

Samuel Henne Addae (born 15 February 1929) is a Ghanaian politician and was a member of the first parliament of the second Republic of Ghana. He represented Brekum constituency under the membership of the Progress Party (PP).

== Early life and education ==
Addae was born on 15 February 1929. He attended Achimota Training College and University of Ghana where he obtained a Teachers' Training Certificate and Bachelor of Arts respectively. He later worked as a Teacher before going to serve at the Parliament of Ghana.

== Politics ==
Addae began his political career in 1969 when he became the parliamentary candidate for the Progress Party (PP) to represent his constituency in the Parliament of Ghana prior to the commencement of the 1969 Ghanaian parliamentary election.

Addae was sworn into the First Parliament of the Second Republic of Ghana on 1 October 1969, after being pronounced winner at the 1969 Ghanaian election held on 26 August 1969 and his tenure of office ended on 13 January 1972.

== Personal life ==
Addae was a Christian.
