= Abdulai Yakubu =

Ghanaian politician (born 1929)

Member of the Ghana Parliament for Savelugu
- In office 1969–1972
- President: Edward Akufo-Addo
- Prime Minister: Kofi Abrefa Busia

Personal details
- Born: 6 May 1929
- Education: Tamale Middle Boarding School
- Occupation: Traditional ruler and a Farmer

Abdulai Yakubu (born 6 May 1929) is a Ghanaian politician and member of the first parliament of the second republic of Ghana representing Savelugu constituency in the Northern Region of Ghana under the membership of the National Alliance Liberals (NAL)

== Early life and education ==
Abdulai was born on 6 May 1929 and lived in Yendi a town in Tamale in the Northern Region of Ghana. He attended Tamale Middle Boarding School, where he obtained a Middle School Leaving Certificate and later served as a Traditional ruler and a Farmer before going into Parliament.

== Politics ==
Yakubu began his political career in 1969, when he became the parliamentary candidate for the NAL to represent his constituency in the Northern Region of Ghana prior to the commencement of the 1969 Ghanaian parliamentary election.

Yakubu was sworn into the First Parliament of the Second Republic of Ghana on 1 October 1969, after being pronounced winner at the 1969 Ghanaian election held on 26 August 1969. His tenure of office as a member of parliament ended on 13 January 1972.

== Personal life ==
Yakubu was a Muslim.
