= Mohammed Abdul-Saaka =

Ghanaian politician

Member of the Ghana Parliament for Walewale
- In office 1 October 1969 – 13 January 1972
- Preceded by: Mahama Tampurie
- Succeeded by: John S. Nabila

Personal details
- Born: 22 July 1935 (age 90) Janga, Ghana
- Citizenship: Ghana
- Education: Prempeh College
- Alma mater: University of Ghana

Mohammed Abdul-Saaka was a Ghanaian politician. He was a deputy minister in the second republic. He served as deputy minister for defence and later deputy minister for internal affairs (now ministry of interior).

== Early life and education ==
Mohammed Saaka was born on 22 July 1935 at Janga, a village near Walewale. He is the son of Namoraa Yimbasi who was a subchief within the Soo Traditional Area, he is also a qualified candidate for the Soo Namship (kingship) through the Naa (chief/king) Kobri Gate in Janga.

Mohammed hailed from Janga in the Northern Region of Ghana. He had his early education at the Gambaga Primary Boarding School from 1947 to 1951 and the Nalerigu Middle Boarding School from 1952 to 1954. He later proceeded to Prempeh College for his secondary and sixth form education from 1955 to 1959 and from 1960 to 1962 respectively. He entered the University of Ghana, Legon in 1962 where he studied law and was called to the bar in 1966.

== Career and politics ==
He practised law privately in Tamale before he ventured into politics. He was also a leader in the Northern Youth Association. He was appointed ministerial secretary at the ministry of defence in 1969.

That same year he was elected as a member of parliament for Walewale on the ticket of the Progress Party. He contested with Kansoni B. Asabigi of the National Alliance of Liberals and Alfred Asaana Illiasu of the All People's Republican Party. In 1971, he was moved to the ministry of interior (internal affairs) as its ministerial secretary.

He served in that position until January 1972 when the Busia government was overthrown by the Supreme Military Council. The overthrown prime minister Kofi Abrefa Busia was then in the United Kingdom and members of the then erstwhile government were being arrested. He sought asylum in Ouagadougou the capital of Burkina Faso which was then known as Upper Volta. In Burkina Faso, he went to the American embassy in Ouagadougou to inform the then American ambassador about the situation in Ghana and requested for arrangements to be made so he could meet the overthrown prime minister. In December 1972 he left Ghana for the United Kingdom.

== Personal life ==
Mohammed was Muslim. He had two children, Jamila and Roland. He lived in London in his later life.

== See also ==
- List of MPs elected in the 1969 Ghanaian parliamentary election
- Busia government
