= Ben Abdulai Yakubu-Tali =

Ghanaian politician

Ben Abdulai Yakubu

Member of the Ghana Parliament for Tolon
- In office 1969–1972
- President: Edward Akufo-Addo

Personal details
- Education: Government Teacher Training College and Pusiga Government Teacher Training College, Tamale
- Occupation: Teacher and a Farmer

Ben Abdulai Yakubu is a Ghanaian politician and member of the first parliament of the second republic of Ghana representing Tolon constituency in the Northern Region of Ghana under the membership of the Progress Party (PP).

== Early life and education ==
Yakubu-Tali was born in Yendi, a town in Tamale in the Northern Region of Ghana. He attended Government Teacher Training College, Tamale and Pusiga Government Teacher Training College, where he obtained a Teachers' Training Certificate and later worked as a teacher and a farmer before going into Parliament.

== Politics ==
Yakubu-Tali begun his political career in 1969 when he became the parliamentary candidate to represent his constituency; Tolon in the Northern Region of Ghana prior to the commencement of the 1969 Ghanaian parliamentary election.

He was sworn into the First Parliament of the Second Republic of Ghana on 1 October 1969, after being pronounced winner at the 1969 Ghanaian election held on 26 August 1969. His tenure of office as a member of parliament ended on 13 January 1972.

== Personal life ==
Yakubu-Tali was a Muslim.
