= Emmanuel Kwasi Addae =

Ghanaian politician (born 1925)

Hon. Emmanuel Kwasi Addae

Member of the Ghana Parliament for Asante-Akim North
- In office 1 October 1969 – 13 January 1972
- President: Edward Akufo-Addo
- Prime Minister: Kofi Abrefa Busia
- Preceded by: Constituency merged
- Succeeded by: Nana Akuoko Sarpong

Personal details
- Born: 1 July 1925
- Education: Heriot-Watt College; Robert Gordon's College
- Occupation: Politician
- Profession: Pharmacist

Emmanuel Kwasi Addae (born 1 July 1925) is a Ghanaian politician and pharmacist. He served as member of parliament for the first parliament of the second republic of Ghana for Asante-Akim North constituency representing the Ashanti Region of Ghana.

== Early life and education ==
Addae was born on 1 July 1925 at Agogo the Ashanti Region of Ghana. He attended Heriot-Watt College where he obtained his certificate in Nursing (Q. R. N). He later enrolled at Robert Gordon's College where he qualified as a Pharmaceutical Chemist (Ph.C.). He is a member of the Pharmaceutical Society of Great Britain.

== Politics ==
Addae was elected during the 1969 Ghanaian parliamentary election as member of the first parliament of the second republic of Ghana. He represented Asante-Akim North constituency on the ticket of the Progress Party (PP). He was succeeded by Nana Akuoko Sarpong during the 1979 parliamentary sitting.

== Career ==
Addae was a pharmacist and nurse by profession. He had also served with the military from 1943 to 1947. He was the proprietor of the New Town Pharmacy, a member of the Ghana Pharmacy and Poison Board, and a member of the Technical Committee for Drugs Standards.

== Personal life ==
Addae was a Christian, and married with seven children; two sons and five daughters. His hobbies included reading and gardening.
