= Kwame Poku Agyekum =

Ghanaian politician

Member of the Ghana Parliament for Amansie Central
- In office 1 October 1969 – 13 January 1972
- President: Edward Akufo-Addo
- Prime Minister: Kofi Abrefa Busia
- Preceded by: Constituency merged
- Succeeded by: Himself
- In office 1979 – 31 December 1981
- President: Hilla Limann
- Preceded by: Himself
- Succeeded by: Constituency abolished

Personal details
- Born: 6 March 1936 (age 90) Kumasi, Ashanti Region, Gold Coast
- Education: St. Augustine's College, Cape Coast
- Alma mater: University of Ghana; Maastricht School of Management

Kwame Poku Agyekum was a Ghanaian politician and member of the first parliament of the second republic of Ghana. He represented the Amansie Central constituency in parliament on the ticket of the Progress Party.

== Early life and education ==
Agyekum was born on 6 March 1935 in Kumasi in the Ashanti Region. He attended St. Augustine's College for his secondary education prior to entering the University of Ghana. Afterwards, he attended the RVB Maastricht School of Management (MSM) Netherlands, now Maastricht School of Management, Maastricht, Netherlands.

== Politics ==
Agyekum began his political career in 1969 when he became the parliamentary candidate for the Progress Party (PP) to represent the Amansie Central constituency prior to the commencement of the 1969 Ghanaian parliamentary election. Agyekum assumed office as a member of the first parliament of the second republic of Ghana on 1 October 1969 after being pronounced winner at the 1969 Ghanaian parliamentary election. His tenure in parliament ended on 13 January 1972 following the I. K. Acheampong led coup d'état that resulted in the overthrow of the Busia government, and the subsequent dissolution of parliament. In 1979 when the country was ushered into civilian rule, he was elected once again to represent the Amansie Central Constituency on the ticket of the Popular Front Party. He represented the constituency from 1979 until 31 December 1981 when the Limann government was overthrown by Flight lieutenant Jerry John Rawlings.

== Personal life ==
Agyekum is a Christian. He is married to Mabel Agyekum with whom he has five children. Maame Dufie, Nana Wadieh, Maame Akua, Nana Poku and Maame Serwaa. He retired from active politics in the 1990's and went into construction and the hospitality business
