= Zakari Ziblim =

Ghanaian politician (born 1925)

Member of the Ghana Parliament for Nanumba Constituency
- In office 1969–1972
- President: Edward Akufo-Addo
- Prime Minister: Kofi Abrefa Busia

Personal details
- Born: 3 April 1925
- Education: Tamale Middle Boarding School and Government Teacher Training College
- Occupation: Teacher

Zakari Ziblim (born 3 April 1925) is a Ghanaian politician who was a member of the first parliament of the second republic of Ghana, representing Nanumba constituency in the Northern Region under the membership of the Progress Party (PP).

== Early life and education ==
Ziblim was born on 3 April 1925 and lived in Nanumba a town in tamale in the Northern Region of Ghana, He attended Tamale Middle Boarding School and Tamale Government Teacher Training College. where he obtained a Teachers' Training Certificate and later worked as a teacher before going into Parliament.

== Politics ==
Ziblim began his political career in 1969 as a parliamentary candidate for the constituency of Nanumba in the Northern Region of Ghana prior to the commencement of the 1969 Ghanaian parliamentary election.

Ziblim was sworn into the First Parliament of the Second Republic of Ghana on 1 October 1969, after being pronounced winner at the 1969 Ghanaian election held on 26 August 1969. His tenure of office as a member of parliament ended on 13 January 1972.

== Personal life ==
Ziblim was a Muslim.
