= Isaiah Kwaku Osei-Duah =

Ghanaian politician and farmer

Member of the Ghana Parliament for Asutifi
- In office 1972–1969
- President: Edward Akufo-Addo
- Prime Minister: Kofi Abrefa Busia
- Preceded by: Edward Kwadwo Twumasi
- Succeeded by: Thomas Broni

Personal details
- Born: 1933 Gold Coast
- Education: Kwame Nkrumah University of Science and Technology

Isaiah Kwaku Osei-Duah (born 1933) is a Ghanaian politician and was a member of the first parliament of the second Republic of Ghana. He represented the Asutifi constituency under the membership of the progress party (PP).

== Early life and education ==
Osei-Duah was born in 1933. He attended Surveyors School Accra and Kwame Nkrumah University of Science and Technology (KNUST). He holds certificates in Land Surveying and Estate Management. He later worked as a Surveyor, Farmer and Trader before going into parliament.

== Politics ==
Osei-Duah) began his political career in 1969 when he became the parliamentary candidate for the Progress Party (PP) to represent the Asutifi Constituency prior to the commencement of the 1969 Ghanaian parliamentary election.

He was sworn into the First Parliament of the Second Republic of Ghana on 1 October 1969, after being pronounced winner at the 1969 Ghanaian election held on 26 August 1969. His tenure of office as a member of parliament ended on 13 January 1972.

== Personal life ==
Osei-Duah is a Christian.
