= Joseph Anim-Danso =

Ghanaian politician (born 1933)

Member of the Ghana Parliament for Kwame Danso
- Prime Minister: Kofi Abrefa Busia
- In office 1969–1972
- President: Edward Akufo-Addo

Personal details
- Born: 30 October 1933 Kwame Danso, Bono East Region, Gold Coast
- Education: University of Ghana

Joseph Anim-Danso (born 30 October 1933) is a Ghanaian politician who was a member of the first parliament of the second Republic of Ghana. He represented the Kwame Danso constituency under the membership of the Progress Party.

== Early life and education ==
Anim-Danso was born on 30 October 1933 in the Bono East Region of Ghana. He attended Cape Coast School of Administration, where he obtained his Elementary and Higher Local Government certificate. He then moved to Accra to advance his education at the University of Ghana, Legon.

== Politics ==
Anim-Danso began his political career in 1969 when he became the parliamentary candidate for the Progress Party (PP) to represent Kwame-Danso constituency prior to the commencement of the 1969 Ghanaian parliamentary election. He assumed office as a member of the first parliament of the second Republic of Ghana on 1 October 1969 after being pronounced winner at the 1969 Ghanaian parliamentary election. His tenure ended on 13 January 1972.

== Personal life ==
Anim-Danso is a Christian.
