= Joseph Addison Anyan =

Ghanaian politician

Member of the Ghana Parliament for Agona
- In office 1969–1972
- President: Kofi Abrefa Busia

Personal details
- Born: October 1, 1908 Agona, Upper East Region, Gold Coast (now Ghana)
- Education: University of London

Joseph Addison Anyan was a Ghanaian politician and was a member of the first parliament of the second Republic of Ghana. He represented Agona constituency under the membership of the Progress Party (PP).

== Early life and education ==
Anyan was born on 1 October 1908. He attended Presbyterian Training College and University of London where he obtained his Teachers' Training Certificate, Catechiste Certificate and London University Associate respectively. He worked as a teacher before going into parliament.

== Personal life ==
Anyan is a Christian and a Teacher.

== Politics ==
He began his political career in 1969 when he became the parliamentary candidate for the Progress Party (PP) to represent his constituency in the Central Region of Ghana prior to the commencement of the 1969 Ghanaian parliamentary election.

He was sworn into the First Parliament of the Second Republic of Ghana on 1 October 1969, after being pronounced winner at the 1969 Ghanaian election held on 26 August 1969 and was later suspended following the overthrow of the Busia government on 13 January 1972.
