= Ofresu Kwabena Poku =

Ghanaian politician (born 1923)

Member of the Ghana Parliament for Nkoransa
- Prime Minister: Kofi Abrefa Busia
- In office 1969–1972
- President: Edward Akufo-Addo

Personal details
- Born: 17 April 1923 Nkoransa, Brong-Ahafo Region, Gold Coast
- Education: University of Ghana

Ofresu Kwabena Poku (born 17 April 1923) is a Ghanaian politician who was a member of the first parliament of the second Republic of Ghana. He represented the Nkoransa constituency under the membership of the Progress Party.

== Early life and education ==
Poku was born on 17 April 1923 in the Brong-Ahafo region of Ghana. He attended Wesley College in Kumasi now known as Wesley College of Education where he obtained his Teachers' Training Certificate and Associateship Certificate of Education. He then moved to Accra to advance his education at the University of Ghana, Legon where he obtained his Inter Bachelor of Laws in Law. He worked as a teacher before going to serve at the parliament of Ghana. He was also a businessman.

== Politics ==
Poku began his political career in 1969 when he became the parliamentary candidate for the Progress Party (PP) to represent Nkoransa constituency prior to the commencement of the 1969 Ghanaian parliamentary election. He assumed office as a member of the first parliament of the second Republic of Ghana on 1 October 1969 after being pronounced winner at the 1969 Ghanaian parliamentary election. His tenure ended on 13 January 1972.

== Personal life ==
Poku was a Christian.
