= Saki Scheck =

Ghanaian politician (1925–2001)

Member of the Ghana Parliament for Takoradi
- In office 1969–1972
- Preceded by: Kwesi Armah
- Succeeded by: William N. Gram

Personal details
- Born: 15 October 1925 Western Region, Ghana
- Died: 8 September 2001 (aged 75) London, England
- Citizenship: Ghana
- Education: University of Oxford; Graduate Institute of International and Development Studies
- Occupation: Lawyer

Saki Scheck (15 October 1925 – 8 September 2001) was a Ghanaian politician and member of the first parliament of the second republic of Ghana representing Takoradi Constituency under the membership of the Progress Party.

== Early life and education ==
Scheck was born 15 October 1925 in the Western Region of Ghana. He had his secondary school education at Mfantsipim School. He obtained his Bachelor of Laws from University of Oxford and he also attended the Graduate Institute of International Studies, Geneva.

== Career and politics ==
Scheck worked as a journalist and a private legal practitioner prior to entering parliament. He was a member of the first parliament of the Second Republic of Ghana representing the Takoradi Constituency on the ticket of the Progress Party (PP). He was elected during the 1969 Ghanaian parliamentary election and was sworn into office on 1 October 1969. He remained a member of parliament from 1969 until parliament was suspended following the overthrow of the Busia government on 13 January 1972.

== Personal life and death ==
Scheck was a Christian. He married Laura Amorin at Sekondi, St Paul Catholic Church in 1963. Together they had six children.

Scheck died in London on 8 September 2001, at the age of 75.

== See also ==
- Busia government
- List of MPs elected in the 1969 Ghanaian parliamentary election
