= Kwabena Adu Kyei =

Ghanaian politician (born 1933)

Member of the Ghana Parliament for Amansie East
- In office 1969–1972
- President: Edward Akufo-Addo
- Prime Minister: Kofi Abrefa Busia
- Preceded by: Constituency merged
- Succeeded by: Kwame Adum-Atta

Personal details
- Born: Kwabena Adu Kyei; 27 November 1933 Dadiasi, Ashanti Region, Gold Coast
- Education: Achimota College

Kwabena Adu Kyei (born 27 November 1933) is a Ghanaian politician who was a member of the first parliament of the second republic of Ghana representing the Amansie East Constituency under the membership of the Progress Party.

== Early life and education ==
Kyei was born on 27 November 1933 in the Ashanti region of Ghana. He attended Achimota School, Accra formerly Prince of Wales College and School, Achimota and later Achimota College. He thereafter proceeded to Roosevelt University College now Roosevelt University, Chicago, Illinois where he obtained his Bachelor of Science degree in Business Biology.

== Politics ==
Kyei began his political career in 1969 when he became the parliamentary candidate for the Progress Party (PP) to represent Amansie-East constituency prior to the commencement of the 1969 Ghanaian parliamentary election. He assumed office as a member of the first parliament of the second republic of Ghana on 1 October 1969 after being pronounced winner at the 1969 Ghanaian parliamentary election. His tenure ended on 13 January 1972.

== Personal life ==
Kyei is a Christian and businessman.
