= Emmanuel Kabutey Narter-Olaga =

Ghanaian politician (born 1924)

Member of the Ghana Parliament for Ada
- In office 1969–1972
- President: Edward Akufo-Addo

Personal details
- Born: 1 January 1924
- Education: Wesley College, University of Hull, and Middle Temple
- Occupation: Lawyer

Emmanuel Kabutey Narter-Olaga (born 1 January 1924) was a Ghanaian politician who was a member of the first parliament of the Second Republic of Ghana. He represented the Ada Ghana constituency under the membership of the National Alliance of Liberals.

== Early life and education ==
Narter-Olaga was born 1 January 1924. He attended Wesley College, University of Hull, and Middle Temple where he obtained his Teachers' Training Certificate and Bachelor of Laws Barrister-at-Law in Law. He later worked as a Lawyer before going into Parliament.

Narter-Olaga was the legal adviser of Vacuum Salt Products Limited.

== Politics ==
Narter-Olaga began his political career in 1969 when he became the parliamentary candidate for the Progress Party to represent his constituency in the Greater Accra of Ghana prior to the commencement of the 1969 Ghanaian parliamentary election.

Narter-Olaga was sworn into the First Parliament of the Second Republic of Ghana on 1 October 1969, after being pronounced winner at the 1969 Ghanaian election held on 26 August 1969 and his tenure ended on 13 January 1972.

== Personal life ==
Narter-Olaga was a Methodist, and worked as a lawyer.
