= Michael Kwame Attah =

Ghanaian politician (born 1939)

Member of the Ghana Parliament for Jaman
- In office 1969–1972
- President: Edward Akufo-Addo
- Prime Minister: Kofi Abrefa Busia

Personal details
- Born: 16 May 1939 (age 87)
- Education: University of Ghana
- Occupation: Politician

Michael Kwame Attah (born 16 May 1939) is a Ghanaian politician and was a member of the first parliament of the second Republic of Ghana. He represented the Jaman constituency under the membership of the Progress Party (PP)

== Early life and education ==
Attah was born on 16 May 1939. He attended University of Ghana where he obtained a Bachelor of Arts in Sociology. He later become a politician.

== Politics ==
He began his political career in 1969 when he became the parliamentary candidate for the Progress Party (PP) to represent his constituency in the Parliament of Ghana prior to the commencement of the 1969 Ghanaian parliamentary election.

He was sworn into the First Parliament of the Second Republic of Ghana on 1 October 1969 after being pronounced winner at the 1969 Ghanaian election held on 26 August 1969 and his tenure of office ended on 13 January 1972.

== Personal life ==
He is a Christian.
