= Victor Kofi Aidoo =

Ghanaian politician (born 1930)

Member of the Ghana Parliament for Twifo-Heman-Denkyira
- In office 1969–1972
- President: Edward Akufo-Addo

Personal details
- Born: 14 March 1930
- Education: Achimota School, University of Science and Technology
- Occupation: Pharmacist

Victor Kofi Aidoo (born 14 March 1930) is a Ghanaian politician who was a member of the first parliament of the second Republic of Ghana. He represented Twifo-Heman-Denkyira constituency under the membership of the progress party (PP)

== Early life and education ==
Victor Kofi Aidoo was born in Dunkwa, Central Region, Ghana, on 14 March 1930. He attended Achimota School, University of Science and Technology where he obtained his Bachelor of Science in pharmaceutical chemistry. He was the president of the Pharmaceutical Society of Ghana and later worked as a pharmacist before entering Parliament.

== Politics ==
Aidoo began his political career in 1969 when he became the parliamentary candidate for the Progress Party (PP) to represent his constituency in the Central Region of Ghana prior to the commencement of the 1969 Ghanaian parliamentary election.

He was sworn into the First Parliament of the Second Republic of Ghana on 1 October 1969, after being pronounced winner at the 1969 Ghanaian election held on 26 August 1969. and his tenure ended on 13 January 1972.

== Personal life ==
Aidoo is a Catholic. He is married with two daughters and one son.
