= Isaac Emmanuel Osei-Bonsu =

Ghanaian politician (born 1924)

Isaac Emmil Osei-Bonsu

Member of the Ghana Parliament for Mid-Volta
- In office 1969–1972
- President: Kofi Abrefa Busia

Personal details
- Born: 18 September 1924 Mid-Volta, Eastern Region, Gold Coast
- Died: 9 February 2008
- Children: 19
- Parent(s): Joseph Kwaku Osei and Madam Christiana Antwiwaa Darkwah
- Education: Achimota School, Fourah Bay College, Durham University

Isaac Emmil Osei-Bonsu (born 18 September 1924) was a Ghanaian politician who was a member of the first parliament of the second republic of Ghana. He represented Mid-Volta constituency under the membership of the Progress Party (PP).

== Early life and education ==
Osei-Bonsu was born on 29 August 1924 in the Eastern region of Ghana. He attended Achimota School formerly Prince of Wales College and School, Achimota, later Achimota College, now nicknamed Motown where he obtained his Teachers' Training Certificate. He then proceeded to Fourah Bay College, Mount Aureol, Freetown, Sierra Leone where he obtained his certificate in General Arts Preliminary Studies. He then moved to England to advance his education at Durham University, Durham, United Kingdom where he obtained his Bachelor of Laws degree in law. He was a company director and lawyer before going into politics and becoming a member of parliament.

== Politics ==
Osei-Bonsu began his political career in 1969 when he became the parliamentary candidate for the Progress Party (PP) to represent Mid-Volta constituency prior to the commencement of the 1969 Ghanaian parliamentary election. He assumed office as a member of the first parliament of the second republic of Ghana on 1 October 1969 after being pronounced winner at the 1969 Ghanaian parliamentary election. His tenure ended on 13 January 1972.

== Personal life ==
Osei-Bonsu was an Anglican.
