= James Davies-Quakyi =

Ghanaian politician (1915–2007)

Member of the Ghana Parliament for Mfantsiman-Sebu
- In office 1969–1972
- President: Edward Akufo-Addo

Personal details
- Born: 15 August 1915 Saltpond, Gold Coast
- Died: 2007
- Education: St. Augustines Training College, School of Social Welfare, Accra
- Occupation: Teacher and Welfare worker

James Davies-Quakyi (15 August 1915 – 2007) was a Ghanaian politician and was a member of the first parliament of the second Republic of Ghana. He represented Mfantsiman-Sebu constituency under the membership of the Progress Party (PP).

== Early life and education ==
Davies-Quakyi was born in Saltpond on 15 August 1915. He attended St. Augustines Training College, School of Social Welfare, Accra. Where he obtained his Diploma in Teachers' Training Certificate in Social worker and later worked as a Teacher and Welfare worker before going into Parliament.

== Politics ==
Davies-Quakyi began his political career in 1969 when he became the parliamentary candidate for the Progress Party (PP) to represent his constituency in the Central Region of Ghana prior to the commencement of the 1969 Ghanaian parliamentary election.

Davies-Quakyi was sworn into the First Parliament of the Second Republic of Ghana on 1 October 1969, after being pronounced winner at the 1969 Ghanaian election held on 26 August 1969 and was later suspended following the overthrow of the Busia government on 13 January 1972.

Davies-Quakyi died in 2007.
