= Albert Gregorio De Souza =

Ghanaian politician (born 1933)

Member of parliament for Keta Constituency
- In office 1969–1972
- President: Edward Akufo-Addo
- Prime Minister: Kofi Abrefa Busia

Personal details
- Born: Albert Gregorio De Souza; 13 September 1933 Gold Coast
- Education: Presbyterian Training College
- Occupation: Politician
- Profession: Teacher

Albert Gregorio De Souza (born 13 September 1933) is a Ghanaian politician and was the member of parliament for the Keta constituency in the 1st parliament of the 2nd republic of Ghana.

== Early life and education ==
De Souza was born on 13 September 1933. He attended the Presbyterian Training College where he obtained a Teacher's Training Certificate.

== Career ==
De Souza with his training obtained in teaching worked as a headmaster in a school in Keta. As a result, apart from being a Ghanaian politician, professionally, he was a teacher.

== Politics ==
De Souza was elected as the member of parliament for the Keta constituency in the 1st parliament of the 2nd republic of Ghana. He was elected on the ticket of the National Alliance of Liberals (NAL) political party.

De Souza was elected following the disqualification by the Supreme Court of the previous member of parliament for the Keta constituency - Mr Komla Gbedemah.

== Personal life ==
De Souza is a Christian. His grandson Komla Messan Gnona is a pharmaceutical scientist in the USA.
