= Joseph Kwesi Mbimadong =

Ghanaian politician (1908–2013)

Hon. Joseph Kwesi Mbimadong

Member of parliament for Gonja East constituency
- In office 1 October 1969 – 13 January 1972
- Succeeded by: Francis Kwame Donkor

Personal details
- Born: c. 1908
- Died: 2013
- Party: National Alliance of Liberals
- Education: Bunda Boarding School and Pusiga Government Training College
- Occupation: Politician
- Profession: Teacher

Joseph Kwesi Yumpo Mbimadong (c. 1908–2013) was a Ghanaian politician and a teacher. He served as member of the first parliament of the second republic of Ghana for Gonja East constituency in the Northern Region of Ghana.

== Early life and education ==
Mbimadong was born in the Northern Region of Ghana. His birth year is contentious, with family members claiming 1909, whereas other sources frequently cite 1922. He attended Bunda Boarding School and Pusiga Government Training College where he obtained his Teachers' Training Certificate.

== Career and politics ==
Mbimadong was a teacher by profession. He was elected during the 1969 Ghanaian parliamentary election as member of the first parliament of the second republic of Ghana on the ticket of the National Alliance of Liberals (NAL). He was succeeded by Francis Kwame Donkor of the People's National Party (PNP) in 1979 Ghanaian general election.

== Personal life and death ==
Mbimadong was a Christian. He died in 2013.
