= David Kojo Duku =

Ghanaian politician

Hon. David Kojo Duku

Member of the Ghana Parliament for Aowin
- In office 1 October 1969 – 13 January 1972

Personal details
- Born: 20 January 1920 (age 106)
- Party: Progress party
- Education: Achimota School
- Occupation: politician
- Profession: Teacher, Traditional ruler

David Kojo Duku is a Ghanaian politician, teacher and traditional ruler who was a member of the first parliament of the second republic of Ghana representing Aowin constituency under the membership of the progress party (PP).

== Early life and education ==
David was born on 20 January 1920. He attended Achimota College, where he obtained Teachers' Training Certificate. He later worked as a Teacher and served as a Traditional ruler before going into Parliament in 1969.

== Career ==
Duku was a teacher by profession. He taught at the Enchi Training College and also served as a Headmaster of the school. He was enstooled divisional chief the Asankra Bremang division of the Wassa Traditional area on 14 February 1965. His stool name was Nana Kofi Animah II.

== Politics ==
Duku began his political career in 1969 when he became the parliamentary candidate for the Progress Party (PP) to represent the Aowin constituency prior to the commencement of the 1969 Ghanaian parliamentary election.

He was sworn into the First Parliament of the Second Republic of Ghana on 1 October 1969, after being pronounced winner at the 1969 Ghanaian Parliamentary election held on 26 August 1969. His tenure of office as a member of parliament ended on 13 January 1972.

== Personal life ==
Duku was a Christian. He was married with two children. His hobbies were swimming and fishing.

== See also ==
- List of MPs elected in the 1969 Ghanaian Parliamentary Elections
