= Kwame Agyei Boaitey =

Ghanaian politician (born 1931)

Member of the Ghana Parliament for Ejisu-Juaben
- In office 1969–1972
- President: Edward Akufo-Addo
- Prime Minister: Kofi Abrefa Busia
- Preceded by: Constituency split
- Succeeded by: John Emmanuel Amoah

Personal details
- Born: 1 October 1931 Ejisu-Juaben, Ashanti Region, Gold Coast
- Education: Wesley College of Education, Kumasi; University of Law

Kwame Agyei Boaitey (born 1 October 1931) is a Ghanaian politician who was a member of the first parliament of the second republic of Ghana representing Ejisu-Juaben constituency under the membership of the Progress Party.

== Early life and education ==
Kwame Agyei Boaitey was born on 1 October 1931 at Ejisu-Juaben in the Ashanti region of Ghana. He attended Wesley College Kumasi now Wesley College of Education where he obtained his Teachers' Training Certificate. He thereafter proceeded to College of Law, London where he obtained his Bachelor of Laws degree in law. He worked as a Barrister-at-Law before entering parliament.

== Politics ==
Boaitey began his political career in 1969 when he became the parliamentary candidate for the Progress Party (PP) to represent Ejisu-Juaben constituency prior to the commencement of the 1969 Ghanaian parliamentary election. He assumed office as a member of the first parliament of the second republic of Ghana on 1 October 1969 after being pronounced winner at the 1969 Ghanaian parliamentary election. His tenure of office as a member of parliament ended on 13 January 1972.

== Personal life ==
Boaitey is a Christian. His hobbies are farming and reading.
