= Samuel Kobina Casely Osei-Baidoo =

Ghanaian politician

Member of the Ghana Parliament for Komenda-Edina-Eguafo-Abrem
- In office 1969–1972
- President: Edward Akufo-Addo

Personal details
- Born: 16 January 1916 (age 110)
- Education: Scottish Mission School, Government Junior Trade School at Mampong-Ashanti, Adisadel College and University of Ghana
- Occupation: Farmer and Personnel Officer

Samuel Kobina Casely Osei-Baidoo is a Ghanaian politician and member of the first parliament of the second republic of Ghana. He represented the Komenda-Edina-Eguafo-Abrem constituency under the membership of the progress party (PP).

== Early life and education ==
Samuel was born on 16 January 1916. He attended Scottish Mission School, Government Junior Trade School at Mampong-Ashanti, Adisadel College in the year 1934 to 1938, and University of Ghana. He later worked as a farmer and Personnel Officer before going into Parliament. He was a trade union organizer.

== Politics ==
He began his political career in 1969 when he became the parliamentary candidate for the Progress Party (PP) to represent his constituency in the Central Region of Ghana prior to the commencement of the 1969 Ghanaian parliamentary election.

He was sworn into the First Parliament of the Second Republic of Ghana on 1 October 1969, after being pronounced winner at the 1969 Ghanaian election held on 26 August 1969. and his tenure ended on 13 January 1972. He was the Ministerial Secretary, Ministry of Agriculture.

== Personal life ==
He is a Christian.
