= Oheneba Kow Aduako Richardson =

Ghanaian politician (born 1925)

Member of the Ghana Parliament for Gomoa-Akyempim
- In office 1969–1972
- President: Edward Akufo-Addo

Personal details
- Born: 3 November 1925
- Education: Agona Swedru Methodist and A.M.E. Zion School
- Occupation: Administrator

Oheneba Kow Aduako Richardson (born 3 November 1925) was a Ghanaian politician who was a member of the first parliament of the second Republic of Ghana. He represented Gomoa-Akyempim constituency under the membership of the Progress Party (PP).

== Early life and education ==
Oheneba was born on 3 November 1925. He attended Agona Swedru Methodist and A.M.E. Zion School, where he obtained his Senior Secondary School Certificate and later worked as an administrator before going into Parliament.

== Politics ==
Richardson began his political career in 1969 when he became the parliamentary candidate for the Progress Party (PP) to represent his constituency in the Central Region of Ghana prior to the commencement of the 1969 Ghanaian parliamentary election.

Richardson was sworn into the First Parliament of the Second Republic of Ghana on 1 October 1969, after being pronounced winner at the 1969 Ghanaian election held on 26 August 1969. His tenure of office ended on 13 January 1972.

== Personal life ==
Richardson is a Methodist.
