= Shanni Hazrat Mahama =

Ghanaian politician

Member of the Ghana Parliament for Yendi
- In office 1969–1972
- President: Edward Akufo-Addo

Personal details
- Born: 1 October 1938 (age 88)
- Education: Yendi Primary School and Katsina Teaching Training College
- Occupation: Teacher

Shanni Hazrat Mahama is a Ghanaian politician and member of the first parliament of the second republic of Ghana representing Yendi constituency in the Northern Region of Ghana under the membership of the Progress Party (PP).

== Early life and education ==
Shanni was born on 1 October 1938 and lived in yendi a town in tamale in the Northern Region of Ghana, He was educated at Yendi Primary School in the year 1949 to 1952, He attended the Ahmadiyya Secondary School from 1954 to 1959, and the Katsina Teaching Training College from 1960 to 1961 when he obtained his Teachers' Training Certificate. He later worked as a teacher before going into Parliament.

== Career ==
He was a Teacher and Ministerial Secretary, Ministry of Agriculture.

== Politics ==
Mahama began his political career in 1969 when he became the parliamentary candidate for the Progress Party to represent Yendi constituency of the Northern Region of Ghana prior to the commencement of the 1969 Ghanaian parliamentary election.

He was sworn into the First Parliament of the Second Republic of Ghana on 1 October 1969, after being pronounced winner at the 1969 parliamentary election held on 26 August 1969. His tenure of office as a member of parliament ended on 13 January 1972.

== Personal life ==
Mahama is a Muslim.
