= Godfreid Kportufe Agama =

Ghanaian politician

Member of the Ghana Parliament for South Tongu
- In office 1969–1972
- Preceded by: Military government
- Succeeded by: Parliament dissolved

Personal details
- Born: 28 April 1936
- Citizenship: Ghana
- Education: McGill University; University of Toronto
- Occupation: Economist

Godfreid Kportufe Agama is a Ghanaian politician and member of the first parliament of the second republic of Ghana representing South Tongu Constituency under the membership of the National Alliance of Liberals (NAL).

== Education and early life ==
He was born 28 April 1936 in Volta Region of Ghana. He attended McGill University, Canada where he obtained Bachelor of Arts in political science. He also obtained his Doctor of Philosophy degree in economics from The University of Toronto, Canada.

== Politic ==
He began his political career in 1969 when he became the parliamentary candidate for the National Alliance of Liberals (NAL) to represent South Tongu constituency prior to the commencement of the 1969 Ghanaian parliamentary election. He assumed office as a member of the first parliament of the second republic of Ghana on 1 October 1969 after being pronounced winner at the 1969 Ghanaian parliamentary election and was later suspended following the overthrow of the Busia government on 13 January 1972. He became Leader of the Parliamentary Opposition until parliament was dissolved by the National Redemption Council following the 13 January 1972 coup d'état.

== Personal life ==
He is a Presbyterian. He is an Economist.

== See also ==
- Busia government
- List of MPs elected in the 1969 Ghanaian parliamentary election
