= Daniel Ayamdo Ayagiba =

Ghanaian politician

Member of the Ghana Parliament for Bawku West
- In office 1969–1972
- President: Kofi Abrefa Busia

Personal details
- Born: 1939 (age 86–87) Bawku West, Upper East Region, Gold Coast

Daniel Ayamdo Ayagiba was a Ghanaian politician and member of the first parliament of the second republic of Ghana representing Bawku West constituency under the membership of the Progress Party (PP).

== Early life and education ==
Ayagiba was born in 1939 in the Upper region of Ghana. He attended Agricultural Training Tamale where he obtained his Agricultural Assistant Certificate with specialization in Agricultural Assistant. He thereafter proceeded to Local Government Training School where he obtained his Certificate of Accountancy in Accounting. He worked as a Farmer before going into parliament.

== Politics ==
Ayagiba began his political career in 1969 when he became the parliamentary candidate for the Progress Party (PP) to represent the Bawku West constituency prior to the commencement of the 1969 Ghanaian parliamentary election. He assumed office as a member of the first parliament of the second republic of Ghana on 1 October 1969 after being a pronounced winner at the 1969 Ghanaian parliamentary election. His tenure ended on 13 January 1972.

== Personal life ==
Ayagiba is a Freethinker.
