= Jatong Silim Sambian =

Ghanaian politician (born 1928)

Hon. Jatong Silim Sambian

Member of parliament for Bunkprugu constituency
- In office 1 October 1969 – 13 January 1972
- Preceded by: De Liman Issahaku
- Succeeded by: John Laar Nurokina

Personal details
- Born: November 1928 (age 97)
- Education: Tamale Middle Boarding School
- Occupation: Politician
- Profession: Teacher

Jatong Silim Sambian (born November 1928) is a Ghanaian politician and a teacher. He represented the Bunkprugu constituency in the Northern Region as a member of the first parliament of the second republic of Ghana under the membership of the ruling Progress Party.

== Early life and education ==
Jatong Silim Sambian is an indigene of Northern Region of Ghana where he was born in November 1928. He is an alumnus of Tamale Middle Boarding School. He also held a Teachers' Training Certificate.

== Political career ==
Sambian was elected into the Parliament after emerging winner of his polls in the 1969 Ghanaian parliamentary election as member of the first parliament of the second republic of Ghana on the ticket of the Progress Party (PP). He was sworn into office on 1 October 1969 and left office on 13 January 1972 after the parliament was dissolved. He was succeeded by John Laar Nurokina of the People's National Party (PNP) who represented the constituency after winning in the 1979 Ghanaian general election.

== Personal life ==
Sambian is a Christian.
