= Robert Kwame Mensah =

Ghanaian politician

Hon. Robert Kwame Mensah

Member of Parliament for Nkwanta constituency
- In office 1 October 1969 – 13 January 1972

Personal details
- Born: 2 November 1935 (age 90)
- Party: Progress Party
- Education: Roman Catholic and Local Authority Schools, Kete-Krachi and Teteman-Buem
- Occupation: Politician
- Profession: Teacher

Robert Kwame Mensah (born 2 November 1935) is a Ghanaian politician and teacher. He served as member of the first parliament of the second republic of Ghana for Nkwanta constituency in the Volta Region of Ghana.

== Early life and education ==
Robert Kwame Mensah, an indigene of the Volta Region of Ghana was born on 2 November 1935. He attended Roman Catholic and Local Authority Schools, Kete-Krachi and Teteman-Buem and obtained respectively a Teachers' Training Certificate, G.C.E (General Certificate of Education) "O" and "A" levels.

== Politics ==
Robert Kwame Mensah was elected during the 1969 Ghanaian parliamentary election as member of the first parliament of the second republic of Ghana on the ticket of the Progress Party. He was on seat from 1 October 1969 to 13 January 1972.

== Personal life ==
He is a Catholic.
