= Joseph Yao Dziwornu-Mensah =

Ghanaian politician (born 1934)

Member of the Ghana Parliament for Some-Aflao
- In office 1969–1972
- Preceded by: Military government
- Succeeded by: Parliament dissolved

Personal details
- Born: 26 September 1934
- Citizenship: Ghana
- Education: Kumasi College of Technology; Winneba Training College; University of Ghana
- Occupation: Teacher and Police Officer

Joseph Yao Dziwornu-Mensah (born 26 September 1934) is a Ghanaian politician and member of the first parliament of the second republic of Ghana representing Some-Aflao Constituency under the membership of the National Alliance of Liberals (NAL).

== Education and early life ==
Dziwornu-Mensah was born 9 September 1934 in Volta Region of Ghana. He attended Winneba Training College where he obtained Teachers' Training Certificate. He also obtained his Bachelor of Arts degree from The University of Ghana, Legon and he attended Kumasi College of Technology.

== Politics ==
Dziwornu-Mensah began his political career in 1969 when he became the parliamentary candidate for the National Alliance of Liberals (NAL) to represent Some-Aflao constituency prior to the commencement of the 1969 Ghanaian parliamentary election. He assumed office as a member of the first parliament of the second republic of Ghana on 1 October 1969 after being pronounced winner at the 1969 Ghanaian parliamentary election and was later suspended following the overthrow of the Busia government on 13 January 1972.

== Personal life ==
Dziwornu-Mensah is a Catholic, and also worked as a teacher and police officer.

== See also ==
- Busia government
- List of MPs elected in the 1969 Ghanaian parliamentary election
