= Azabiri Ayamga =

Ghanaian politician (born 1933)

Hon. Azabiri Ayamga

Member of parliament for Bongo constituency
- In office 1 October 1969 – 13 January 1972

Personal details
- Born: 1933
- Party: Progress Party
- Education: Government Teacher Training College Tamale, Kwame Nkrumah Ideological Institute, Winneba
- Occupation: Politician
- Profession: Teacher

Azabiri Ayamga (born 1933) is a Ghanaian politician and member of the first parliament of the second republic of Ghana representing Bongo constituency in the Upper Region of Ghana under the membership of the Progress Party (PP).

== Early life and education ==
Azabiri was born in 1933. He attended Government Teacher Training College Tamale (G.T.T.C. - Tamale), Kwame Nkrumah Ideological Institute, Winneba where he obtained a Teachers' Training Certificate and later worked as a Teacher before going into Parliament.

== Politics ==
Ayamga began his political career in 1969 as a parliamentary candidate for the constituency of Bongo in the Upper Region of Ghana prior to the commencement of the 1969 Ghanaian parliamentary election.

He was sworn into the First Parliament of the Second Republic of Ghana on 1 October 1969, after being pronounced winner at the 1969 Ghanaian election held on 26 August 1969. His tenure of office ended on 13 January 1972.

== Personal life ==
Ayamga is a Christian.
