= Yaw Brefo Darkwa-Dwamena =

Ghanaian politician (born 1932)

Member of the Ghana Parliament for Offinso
- In office 1 October 1969 – 13 January 1972
- Preceded by: Joseph Abrensu Owusu-Ansah
- Succeeded by: Kwadwo Takyi-Berko

Personal details
- Born: 23 March 1932 Ashanti Region, Gold Coast
- Education: Prempeh College
- Alma mater: University of Hull

Yaw Brefo Darkwa-Dwamena (born 23 March 1932) is a Ghanaian politician who was a member of the first parliament of the second republic of Ghana representing Offinso constituency under the membership of the Progress Party.

== Early life and education ==
Darkwa-Dwamena was born on 23 March 1932 in the Ashanti region of Ghana. He attended Prempeh College, Kumasi. He thereafter moved to England to advance his education at the University of Hull where he obtained his Bachelor of Laws degree in law. He worked as a Barrister-at-Law before going into parliament.

== Politics ==
Darkwa-Dwamena began his political career in 1969 when he became the parliamentary candidate for the Progress Party (PP) to represent Offinso constituency prior to the commencement of the 1969 Ghanaian parliamentary election. He assumed office as a member of the first parliament of the second republic of Ghana on 1 October 1969 after being pronounced winner at the 1969 Ghanaian parliamentary election. His tenure ended on 13 January 1972.

== Personal life ==
Darkwa-Dwamena is a Christian and cocoa farmer.
