= Mosobila Kpamma =

Ghanaian politician

Hon. Mosobila Kpamma

Member of Parliament for Talensi-Nabdam constituency
- In office 1 October 1969 – 13 January 1972

Personal details
- Born: 1934 (age 91–92)
- Party: Progress Party
- Education: Tamale Teacher Training College
- Occupation: Politician
- Profession: Teacher

Mosobila Kpamma is a Ghanaian politician and member of the first parliament of the second republic of Ghana representing Talensi-Nabdam constituency in the Upper Region of Ghana under the membership of the Progress Party (PP).

== Early life and education ==
Mosobila was born on 1934. He attended Tamale Teacher Training College. where he obtained a Teachers' Training Certificate and later worked as a teacher before going into Parliament.

== Career and Politics ==
Kpamma worked as teacher before entering into politics. He began his political career in 1969 when he became the parliamentary candidate to represent his constituency Talensi-Nabdam in the Upper Region of Ghana prior to the commencement of the 1969 Ghanaian parliamentary election.

He was sworn into the First Parliament of the Second Republic of Ghana on 1 October 1969, after being pronounced winner at the 1969 Ghanaian election held on 26 August 1969. and his tenure of office ended on 13 January 1972.

== Personal life ==
He was a chief in his town, Christian in faith.
