= Alex Hutton-Mills =

Ghanaian politician

Member of the Ghana Parliament for Ga
- In office 1969–1972
- President: Edward Akufo-Addo

Personal details
- Born: 26 December 1935 (age 90)
- Education: Dulwich College; Keble College; Middle Temple
- Occupation: Lawyer and politician

Alex Hutton-Mills is a Ghanaian politician and was a member of the first parliament of the second Republic of Ghana. He represented the Ga constituency under the membership of the United Nationalist Party (UNP).

== Early life and education ==
Alex Hutton-Mills was born on 26 December 1935. He attended Dulwich College, Keble College, Oxford, and the Middle Temple where he obtained a Bachelor of Laws in Law. He later worked as a lawyer before going into Parliament.

He was the managing director of the Tema food complex corporation.

== Personal life ==
He is a Christian.

== Politics ==
Hutton-Mills began his political career in 1969 when he became the parliamentary candidate for the United Nationalist Party (UNP) to represent his constituency in the Greater Accra Region of Ghana prior to the commencement of the 1969 Ghanaian parliamentary election.

He was sworn into the Parliament of the Second Republic of Ghana on 1 October 1969, after being pronounced winner of the 1969 Ghanaian election held on 26 August 1969. His tenure ended on 13 January 1972.
