= Samuel Benson Adjepong =

Ghanaian politician

Member of the Ghana Parliament for Oda
- In office 1969–1972
- President: Kofi Abrefa Busia

Personal details
- Born: 30 May 1914 Akim Oda, Eastern Region, Gold Coast
- Education: UCL School of Pharmacy

Samuel Benson Adjepong was a Ghanaian politician and was a member of the first parliament of the second Republic of Ghana. He represented the Oda constituency under the membership of the Progress Party (PP).

== Early life and education ==
Adjepong was born on 30 May 1914 in the Eastern region of Ghana. He attended Chelsea School of Pharmacy, London now UCL School of Pharmacy, London, United Kingdom where he obtained a Bachelor of Science degree with specialty in Pharmaceutical Chemistry. He worked as a Pharmacist and managing director before going into parliament.

== Politics ==
Adjepong began his political career in 1969 when he became the parliamentary candidate for the Progress Party (PP) to represent the Oda constituency prior to the commencement of the 1969 Ghanaian parliamentary election. He assumed office as a member of the first parliament of the second republic of Ghana on 1 October 1969 after being a pronounced winner at the 1969 Ghanaian parliamentary election. His tenure ended on 13 January 1972.

== Personal life ==
Adjepong was a Christian.
