= Lydia Azuele Akanbodiipo =

Ghanaian politician

Member of the Ghana Parliament for Sandema
- In office 1969–1972
- Preceded by: Military government
- Succeeded by: Parliament dissolved

Personal details
- Born: 14 October 1942
- Citizenship: Ghana
- Education: Winneba Training College
- Occupation: Physical Education Specialist Teacher

Lydia Azuele Akanbodiipo is a Ghanaian politician and member of the first parliament of the second republic of Ghana representing Sandema Constituency under the membership of the National Alliance of Liberals (NAL).

== Education and early life ==
She was born 14 October 1942 in Upper Region of Ghana. She also obtained his Diploma degree in Physical Education from Winneba Training College.

== Politics ==
She began her political career in 1969 when she became the parliamentary candidate for the National Alliance of Liberals (NAL) to represent Sandema constituency prior to the commencement of the 1969 Ghanaian parliamentary election. She assumed office as a member of the first parliament of the second republic of Ghana on 1 October 1969 after being pronounced winner at the 1969 Ghanaian parliamentary election and was later suspended following the overthrow of the Busia government on 13 January 1972.

Lydia also once served as opposition chief whip.

== Personal life ==
She is a Christian. She is a Physical Education Specialist Teacher.

== See also ==
- List of MPs elected in the 1969 Ghanaian parliamentary election
