= Isaac Amissah-Aidoo =

Ghanaian politician (1927–2005)

Member of the Ghana Parliament for Assin
- In office 1 October 1969 – 13 January 1972
- Preceded by: Military government

Personal details
- Born: 1927
- Died: 14 September 2005 (aged 78)
- Education: University of Ibadan, University of Dublin, Trinity College
- Occupation: Lawyer

Isaac Amissah-Aidoo (1927 – 14 September 2005) was a Ghanaian lawyer, tribal chief and politician. He was a member of the first parliament of the second Republic of Ghana, representing the Assin constituency under the membership of the progress party (PP).

== Early life and education ==
Isaac Amissah-Aidoo was born in 1927. He was an alumnus of the University of Ibadan where he received his Bachelor of Arts degree in law. He also attended Trinity College Dublin where he obtained another Bachelor of Arts degree in law and later obtained his Masters of Arts degree in law. He worked as a lawyer before going into Parliament.

== Politics ==
Amissah-Aidoo began his political career in 1969 when he became the parliamentary candidate for the Progress Party (PP) to represent the Assin constituency in the Central Region of Ghana prior to the commencement of the 1969 Ghanaian parliamentary election.

On 1 October 1969, Amissah-Aidoo was sworn in to the First Parliament of the Second Republic of Ghana, after being pronounced the winner of the 1969 Ghanaian election held on 26 August 1969.

Amissah-Aidoo was the Deputy Speaker of the National Assembly in 1969.

== Personal life and death ==
Isaac Amissah-Aidoo was a Christian. He died on 14 September 2005, at the age of 78.
