= Richard Kwaku Osei =

Ghanaian politician

Member of the Ghana Parliament for Krobo
- In office 1969–1972
- President: Edward Akufo-Addo

Personal details
- Born: 1918 (age 107–108) Krobo, Eastern Region, Gold Coast
- Education: anyakpongunor Presbyterian Primary School, Bana Hill Presbyterian Middle School
- Occupation: Politician, Farmer, Business man

Richard Kwaku Osei is a Ghanaian politician and was a member of the first parliament of the second Republic of Ghana. He represented the Krobo constituency under the membership of the National Alliance of Liberals (NAL).

== Early life and education ==
Osei was born in 1918 in the Eastern region of Ghana. He attended Manyakpongunor Presbyterian Primary School and Bana Hill Presbyterian Middle School where he obtained his Standard Seven Certificate. He worked as a farmer and as a businessman before going into parliament.

== Politics ==
Osei began his political career in 1969 when he became the parliamentary candidate for the Progress Party (PP) to represent Krobo constituency prior to the commencement of the 1969 Ghanaian parliamentary election. He assumed office as a member of the first parliament of the second republic of Ghana on 1 October 1969 after being pronounced winner at the 1969 Ghanaian parliamentary election. His tenure ended on 13 January 1972.

== Personal life ==
Osei is a Christian.
