= Kobina Amua-Sekyi =

Ghanaian politician

Member of the Ghana Parliament for Ekumfi
- In office 1969–1972
- President: Edward Akufo-Addo

Personal details
- Born: 6 May 1902
- Education: Methodist School Saltpond
- Occupation: Merchant and a Traditional ruler

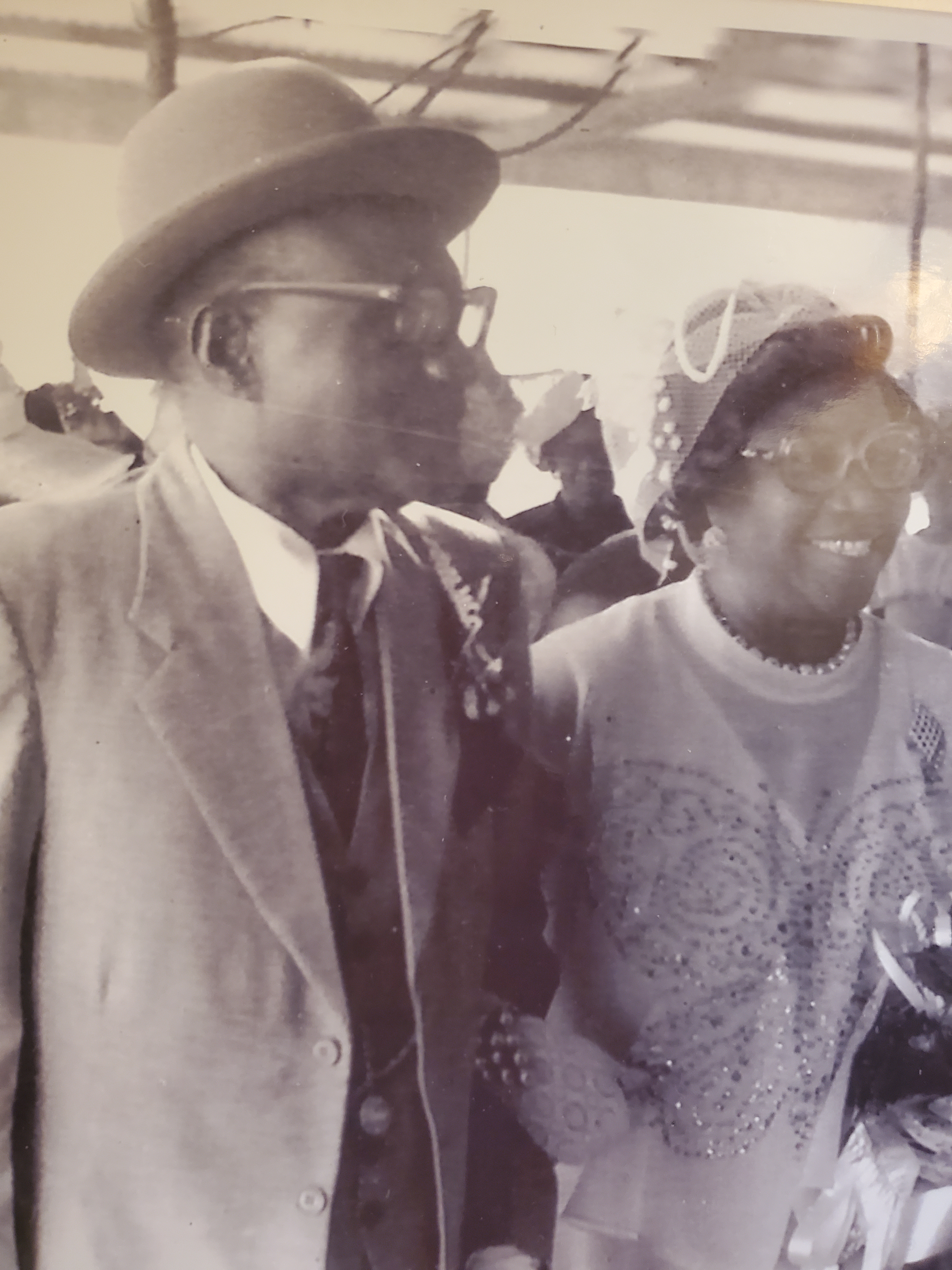
Kobina Amua-Sekyi with wife Comfort Amua-Sekyi (nee Ogunro)

Kobina Amua-Sekyi was a Ghanaian politician and was a member of the first parliament of the second Republic of Ghana. He represented the Ekumfi constituency under the membership of the Progress Party (PP).

== Early life and education ==
Kobina was born on 6 May 1902. He attended Methodist School Saltpond. Where he obtained his Standard Seven, Civil Service Examination and later worked as a Merchant and a Traditional ruler before going into Parliament.

== Personal life ==
He was a Christian. He is the father of Supreme Court Justice Kweku Etrew Amua-Sekyi. His daughter Mavis Amua-Sekyi was married to Ghanaian artist and musician Saka Acquaye.

== Politics ==
He began his political career in 1969 when he became the parliamentary candidate for the Progress Party (PP) to represent his constituency in the Central Region of Ghana prior to the commencement of the 1969 Ghanaian parliamentary election.

He was sworn into the First Parliament of the Second Republic of Ghana on 1 October 1969, after being pronounced winner at the 1969 Ghanaian election held on 26 August 1969.
