= Joseph Bukari Alhassan =

Ghanaian politician

Hon. Joseph Bukari Alhassan

Member of parliament for the Gonja Central constituency
- In office 1 October 1969 – 13 January 1972
- Preceded by: New Constituency
- Succeeded by: Seidu Zakaria

Personal details
- Party: Progress Party
- Occupation: Politician

Joseph Bukari Alhassan is a Ghanaian politician who served as a member of the first parliament of the second republic of Ghana for Gonja Central constituency in the Northern Region of Ghana.

== Politics ==
Joseph Bukari Alhassan was elected during the 1969 Ghanaian parliamentary election on the ticket of the Progress Party (PP) as member of the first parliament of the second republic of Ghana. He was succeeded by Seidu Zakaria of the People's National Party (PNP) in the first parliament of the third republic of Ghana in 1979 Ghanaian general election.
