= Christopher Kwaku Nayo =

Politician in Ghana

Member of the Ghana Parliament for Buem
- In office 1969–1972
- Preceded by: Military government
- Succeeded by: Parliament dissolved

Personal details
- Born: 26 September 1926
- Died: 2003
- Citizenship: Ghana
- Education: University of Ghana; Presbyterian College of Education, Akropong
- Occupation: Teacher

Christopher Kwaku Nayo (26 September 1926 – 2003) was a Ghanaian politician and member of the first parliament of the second republic of Ghana representing Buem Constituency under the membership of the National Alliance of Liberals (NAL).

== Education and early life ==
He was born 26 September 1926 in Volta Region of Ghana. He attended Presbyterian Teachers' Training College where he obtained Teachers' Training Certificate. He also obtained his Bachelor of Arts degree in Basic Education from The University of Ghana, Legon and he also attended University of London.

== Politics ==
He began his political career in 1969 when he became the parliamentary candidate for the National Alliance of Liberals (NAL) to represent Buem constituency prior to the commencement of the 1969 Ghanaian parliamentary election. He assumed office as a member of the first parliament of the second republic of Ghana on 1 October 1969 after being pronounced winner at the 1969 Ghanaian parliamentary election and was later suspended following the overthrow of the Busia government on 13 January 1972.

== Personal life ==
He was a Christian. He was a Teacher.

== See also ==
- Busia government
- List of MPs elected in the 1969 Ghanaian parliamentary election
