= Benard Kwaku Mensah =

Ghanaian politician

Member of the Ghana Parliament for Krachi
- In office 1969–1972
- Preceded by: Military government
- Succeeded by: Parliament dissolved

Personal details
- Born: 1924
- Citizenship: Ghana
- Education: St. Peters School, Kumasi
- Occupation: Teacher

Benard Kwaku Mensah (born 1924) was a Ghanaian politician and member of the first parliament of the second republic of Ghana representing Krachi Constituency under the membership of the Progress Party (PP).

== Education and early life ==
Mensah was born in Volta Region of Ghana in 1924. He attended St. Peters School, Kumasi where he obtained Standard Seven Certificate.

== Politics ==
Mensah began his political career in 1969 when he became the parliamentary candidate for the Progress Party (PP) to represent Krachi constituency prior to the commencement of the 1969 Ghanaian parliamentary election. He assumed office as a member of the first parliament of the second republic of Ghana on 1 October 1969 after being pronounced winner at the 1969 Ghanaian parliamentary election and was later suspended following the overthrow of the Busia government on 13 January 1972.

== Personal life ==
Mensah was a Christian, and worked as a teacher.

== See also ==
- Busia government
- List of MPs elected in the 1969 Ghanaian parliamentary election
