= James Adam Mahama =

Ghanaian politician (born 1932)

Hon. James Adam Mahama

Member of parliament for Gonja West constituency
- In office 1 October 1969 – 13 January 1972
- Succeeded by: Yakubu Saaka

Personal details
- Party: Progress Party
- Education: Salaga Primary School and Tamale Middle Boarding School
- Occupation: politician
- Profession: Teacher

James Adam Mahama (born May 1932) is a Ghanaian politician and teacher. He served as a member of the first parliament of the Second Republic of Ghana for Gonja West constituency in the Northern Region.

== Early life and education ==
Mahama attended Salaga Primary School and Tamale Middle Boarding School, where he obtained a Teachers' Training Certificate.

== Politics ==
During the 1969 Ghanaian parliamentary election, Mahama was elected as a member of the first parliament of the Second Republic on the ticket of the Progress Party. He was succeeded by Yakubu Saaka of the People's National Party in the 1979 Ghanaian general election.

== Career ==
Mahama is a cinematographer and a teacher by profession.
