= Duke Joseph Banson =

Ghanaian politician (born 1912)

Joseph Duke Banson

Member of the Ghana Parliament for Ejumako Breman-Enyan
- In office 1969–1972
- Preceded by: Military government
- Succeeded by: Parliament dissolved

Personal details
- Born: 21 September 1912
- Citizenship: Ghana
- Education: Institute of London School of Commerce, and Association of Advanced Management in commerce and Industry Certificate
- Occupation: Manager

Joseph Duke Banson (born 21 September 1912, date of death unknown) was a Ghanaian politician and was a member of the first parliament of the second Republic of Ghana. He represented Ejumako Breman-Enyan constituency under the membership of the Progress Party (PP).

== Early life and education ==
Banson was born on 24 September 1912. He attended Institute of London School of Commerce, and Association of Advanced Management in commerce and Industry Certificate where he obtained his Certificate in Commerce. He worked as a Managing Director before going into Parliament.

== Personal life ==
Banson was a Christian. He worked as a managing director.

== Politics ==
Banson began his political career in 1969 when he became the parliamentary candidate for the Progress Party (PP) to represent his constituency in the Central Region of Ghana prior to the commencement of the 1969 Ghanaian parliamentary election.

Banson was sworn into the First Parliament of the Second Republic of Ghana on 1 October 1969, after being pronounced winner at the 1969 Ghanaian election held on 26 August 1969 and was later suspended following the overthrow of the Busia government on 13 January 1972.
