= Daniel Kwasi Avoke =

Ghanaian politician (born 1933)

Member of the Ghana Parliament for East Dayi
- In office 1969–1972
- Preceded by: Military government
- Succeeded by: Parliament dissolved

Personal details
- Born: 1 December 1933
- Citizenship: Ghana
- Education: University of Ghana; Kwame Nkrumah University of Science and Technology; (KNUST)
- Occupation: Lecturer

Daniel Kwasi Avoke (born 1 December 1933) is a Ghanaian politician who was a member of the first parliament of the second republic of Ghana representing East Dayi Constituency under the membership of the National Alliance of Liberals (NAL).

== Education and early life ==
Avoke was born 1 December 1933 in Volta Region of Ghana. He attended Kwame Nkrumah University of Science and Technology (KNUST), Ghana. He also obtained his Bachelor of Arts degree in history from The University of Ghana, Legon.

== Politics ==
Avoke began his political career in 1969 when he became the parliamentary candidate for the National Alliance of Liberals (NAL) to represent East Dayi constituency prior to the commencement of the 1969 Ghanaian parliamentary election. He assumed office as a member of the first parliament of the second republic of Ghana on 1 October 1969 after being pronounced winner at the 1969 Ghanaian parliamentary election and was later suspended following the overthrow of the Busia government on 13 January 1972.

== Personal life ==
Avoke is a Christian, and worked as a lecturer.

== See also ==
- Busia government
- List of MPs elected in the 1969 Ghanaian parliamentary election
