= George Oteng =

Ghanaian politician from 1969 to 1972

Member of the Ghana Parliament for Asiakwa-Kwaben
- In office 1969–1972
- President: Edward Akufo-Addo

Personal details
- Born: 17 August 1916 (age 110) Asiakwa-Kwaben, Eastern Region, Gold Coast
- Party: Progress Party
- Children: Gloria Oteng
- Education: Achimota School, Co-operative College
- Occupation: Politician
- Profession: Co-operative Administration Secretary

George Oteng is a Ghanaian politician and was a member of the first parliament of the second Republic of Ghana. He represented the Asiakwa-Kwaben constituency under the membership of the Progress Party.

== Early life and education ==
Oteng was born on 17 August 1916 in the Eastern region of Ghana. He attended Achimota School formerly Prince of Wales College and School, Achimota, currently known as Achimota College, with the nicknamed "Motown". He then moved to London to advance his education at the Co-operative College, Stanford Hall, Loughborough where he obtained his Co-operative Diploma. He worked as a Co-operative Administration Secretary before going into parliament. In 1968, Oteng was the then secretary of Ghana Co-operative Marketing Association Limited and was part of the delegation led by Mr J. Obuobi who was the registrar of Ghana Co-operative Marketing Association Limited to represent Ghana at the Afro-Asian Rural Reconstruction Conference held in North Korea in 1971.

== Politics ==
Oteng began his political career in 1969 when he became the parliamentary candidate for the Progress Party (PP) to represent Asiakwa-Kwaben constituency prior to the commencement of the 1969 Ghanaian parliamentary election. He assumed office as a member of the first parliament of the second republic of Ghana on 1 October 1969 after being pronounced winner at the 1969 Ghanaian parliamentary election. His tenure ended on 13 January 1972.

== Personal life ==
Oteng is a Presbyterian.
