= Richard Tetteh Seglah =

Ghanaian politician (1932–2014)

Hon. Richard Tetteh Seglah

Member of parliament for Anlo constituency
- In office 1 October 1969 – 13 January 1972

Personal details
- Born: 30 July 1932
- Died: 2014 (aged 81–82) London, England
- Party: National Alliance of Liberals
- Education: University of Ghana
- Occupation: Politician
- Profession: Barrister and solicitor

Richard Tetteh Seglah (30 July 1932 – 2014) was a Ghanaian politician who was a member of the first parliament of the second republic of Ghana representing Anlo constituency in the Volta Region of Ghana under the membership of the National Alliance Liberals.

== Early life and education ==
Seglah was born on 30 July 1932. He attended Zion College, Wesley College and University of Ghana. where he obtained a Teachers' Training Certificate, Bachelor of Arts and Bachelor of Laws respectively in Law and later worked as a barrister and solicitor before going into Parliament.

== Career and politics ==
Seglah begun his career as a barrister and solicitor. His political career begun in 1969 when he became the parliamentary candidate to represent his constituency Anlo in the Volta Region of Ghana prior to the commencement of the 1969 Ghanaian parliamentary election.

He was sworn into the First Parliament of the Second Republic of Ghana on 1 October 1969, after being pronounced winner at the 1969 Ghanaian election held on 26 August 1969. and his tenure of office ended on 13 January 1972.

== Personal life and death ==
Seglah was Presbyterian. He died in London, England in 2014.
