= Ayamba Atia =

Ghanaian politician

Member of the Ghana Parliament for Zebilla
- In office 1969–1972
- Preceded by: Military government
- Succeeded by: Parliament dissolved

Personal details
- Citizenship: Ghana
- Education: Government Teacher Training College, Pusiga. Government Teacher Training College, Tamale
- Occupation: Farmer

Ayamba Atia is a Ghanaian politician and member of the first parliament of the second republic of Ghana representing Zebilla Constituency under the membership of the National Alliance of Liberals (NAL).

== Education and early life ==
He was born 1940 in Upper Region of Ghana. He attended Government Teacher Training College, Pusiga where he obtained Teachers' Training Certificate. He also attended Government Teacher Training College, Tamale where he obtained Teachers' Training Certificate.

== Politics ==
He began his political career in 1969 when he became the parliamentary candidate for the National Alliance of Liberals (NAL) to represent Zebilla constituency prior to the commencement of the 1969 Ghanaian parliamentary election. He assumed office as a member of the first parliament of the second republic of Ghana on 1 October 1969 after being pronounced winner at the 1969 Ghanaian parliamentary election and was later suspended following the overthrow of the Busia government on 13 January 1972.

== Personal life ==
He is a Farmer.

== See also ==
- Busia government
- List of MPs elected in the 1969 Ghanaian parliamentary election
