= Ebenezer Theophilus Odartei Ayeh =

Ghanaian politician

Member of the Ghana Parliament for Nsawam-Aburi
- In office 1969–1972
- President: Edward Akufo-Addo

Personal details
- Born: 18 December 1920 Nsawam-Aburi, Brong-Ahafo Region, Gold Coast
- Education: University of Ghana

Ebenezer Theophilus Odartei Ayeh is a Ghanaian politician and was a member of the first parliament of the second Republic of Ghana. He represented Nsawam-Aburi constituency under the membership of the Progress Party.

== Early life and education ==
Ebenezer was born on 18 December 1920 in the Eastern region of Ghana. He attended Achimota School formerly Prince of Wales College and School, Achimota, currently known as Achimota College, with the nickname "Motown". He then moved to Accra to advance his education at the University of Ghana, Legon where he obtained his bachelor's degree in law. He worked as a Barrister and Solicitor before going into parliament.

== Politics ==
Ebenezer began his political career in 1969 when he became the parliamentary candidate for the Progress Party (PP) to represent Nsawam-Aburi constituency prior to the commencement of the 1969 Ghanaian parliamentary election. He assumed office as a member of the first parliament of the second Republic of Ghana on 1 October 1969 after being pronounced winner at the 1969 Ghanaian parliamentary election. His tenure ended on 13 January 1972.

== Personal life ==
He is a Christian.
