= Bliss Ackuaku =

Ghanaian politician

Member of the Ghana Parliament for Dzodze
- In office 1969–1972
- Preceded by: Military government
- Succeeded by: Parliament dissolved

Personal details
- Born: 2 April 1918
- Citizenship: Ghana
- Education: University of London; Achimota College
- Occupation: Company Director and Accountant

Bliss Ackuaku (born 18 April 1918) is a Ghanaian politician and member of the first parliament of the second republic of Ghana representing Dzodze Constituency under the membership of the National Alliance of Liberals (NAL).

== Education and early life ==
Ackuaku was born on 18 April 1918 in Volta Region of Ghana. He attended Achimota College. He also obtained his Bachelor of Laws degree from The University of London and he also attended King's College.

== Politics ==
Ackuaku began his political career in 1969 when he became the parliamentary candidate for the National Alliance of Liberals (NAL) to represent Dzodze constituency prior to the commencement of the 1969 Ghanaian parliamentary election. He assumed office as a member of the first parliament of the second republic of Ghana on 1 October 1969 after being pronounced winner at the 1969 Ghanaian parliamentary election and was later suspended following the overthrow of the Busia government on 13 January 1972.

== Personal life ==
Ackuaku is a Christian. He is a Company Director and Accountant.

== See also ==
- Busia government
- List of MPs elected in the 1969 Ghanaian parliamentary election
