= James Ben Kaba =

Ghanaian politician

Member of the Ghana Parliament for Bolgatanga
- In office 1969–1972
- President: Kofi Abrefa Busia

Personal details
- Born: 25 July 1942 (age 84) Bolgatanga, Upper East Region, Gold Coast
- Education: University of Ghana

James Ben Kaba was a Ghanaian politician and member of the first parliament of the second republic of Ghana representing Bolgatanga constituency under the membership of the Progress Party (PP).

== Early life and education ==
Kaba was born on 25 July 1942 in the Upper East region of Ghana. He attended Mfantsipim College formerly Mfantsipim School. He then moved to Accra to advance his education at University of Ghana where he obtained his Bachelor of Laws with specialization in Law. He worked as a Lawyer before going into parliament.

== Politics ==
Kaba began his political career in 1969 when he became the parliamentary candidate for the Progress Party (PP) to represent the Bolgatanga constituency prior to the commencement of the 1969 Ghanaian parliamentary election. He assumed office as a member of the first parliament of the second republic of Ghana on 1 October 1969 after being a pronounced winner at the 1969 Ghanaian parliamentary election. His tenure ended on 13 January 1972.

== Personal life ==
Kaba is a Catholic Christian.
