= Emmanuel Kwadwo Adu =

Ghanaian politician

Member of the Ghana Parliament for Abetifi
- In office 1969–1972
- Preceded by: Military government
- Succeeded by: Parliament dissolved

Personal details
- Born: Abetifi, Eastern Region
- Citizenship: Ghana
- Education: Norwood Technical College, London, University of Ghana
- Occupation: Businessman, Politician

Emmanuel Kwadwo Adu is a Ghanaian politician who served as member of parliament for Abetifi from 1969 to 1972. He later became an ambassador for Ghana.

== Early life and education ==
Emmanuel is a native of Abetifi, a constituency in the Eastern Region of Ghana. He was born in 1945 and attended Norwood Technical College, London.

== Politics ==
Emmanuel was a member of parliament representing Abetifi, a constituency in the Eastern region of Ghana in the parliament of the Second Republic of Ghana, as part of the Progress Party (PP). He was elected into office in the 1969 Ghanaian parliamentary election. The term started on 1 October 1969 and ended on 13 January 1972 when parliament was dissolved. Emmanuel polled 6,671 votes while his opponent Alfred Kye (Independent) polled 1,930 votes.

== Career ==
He was among eight ambassadors appointed by president John Agyekum Kufuor on 15 September 2001 in Accra, as the Ghanaian ambassador to Denmark. He was appointed to the post in 2001 by the PNP Government and helped bring businesses to Ghana including Telenor and Norsk Hydro-, both from Norway. From 14 March 2006 to 13 June 2014 he was ambassador to Porto Novo (Benin) and was West African representative of Scancem International, and CEO of Judah (Alabado) Ltd.

He is a sports enthusiast, and was vice president of the Ghana Football Association 1992–1994, and president of Kumasi Asante Kotoko Football Club from 1994 to 1996.

== See also ==
- Busia government
- List of MPs elected in the 1969 Ghanaian parliamentary election
