= James Nagra Momori =

Ghanaian politician

Hon. James Nagra Momori

Member of Parliament for Wa East constituency
- In office 1 October 1969 – 13 January 1972

Personal details
- Born: 1919
- Party: Progress Party
- Education: Tamale Middle Boarding School
- Occupation: Politician
- Profession: Farmer

James Nagra Momori was a Ghanaian politician and member of the first parliament of the second republic of Ghana representing Wa East constituency in the Upper Region of Ghana under the membership of the Progress Party (PP).

== Early life and education ==
James was born in 1919. He attended Tamale Middle Boarding School where he obtained a General Certificate Education G.C.E. (External). He later worked as a farmer before going into Parliament.

== Politics ==
He began his political career in 1969 when he became the parliamentary candidate to represent his constituency Wa East in the Upper Region of Ghana prior to the commencement of the 1969 Ghanaian parliamentary election.

He was sworn into the First Parliament of the Second Republic of Ghana on 1 October 1969, after being pronounced winner at the 1969 Ghanaian election held on 26 August 1969. His tenure of office ended on 13 January 1972.

== Personal life ==
He was Muslim (Islam) in faith.
