= Edwin Kyige Mumuni Dimbie =

Ghanaian politician

Hon. Edwin Kyige Mumuni Dimbie

Member of Parliament for Tumu constituency
- In office 1 October 1969 – 13 January 1972

Personal details
- Born: 1918
- Died: 2014 (aged 95–96)
- Party: Progress Party
- Occupation: Teacher and a Traditional
- Profession: Teacher

Edwin Kyige Mumuni Dimbie (1918-2014) was a Ghanaian Politician and member of the first parliament of the second republic of Ghana representing Tumu constituency in the Upper East Region of Ghana under the membership of the Progress Party (PP).

== Early life and education ==
Edwin was born in 1918. He obtained a Teachers' Training Certificate.

== Politics ==
Dimbie worked as a Teacher and a Traditional ruler before going into Parliament. He once served as the chairman of the Tumu District council. Dimbie was appointed by Nkrumah to serve as the Chairman of Cocoa Marketing Board.

He began his political career in 1969 as a parliamentary candidate for the constituency of Tumu in the Upper East Region of Ghana prior to the commencement of the 1969 Ghanaian parliamentary election. He was sworn into the First Parliament of the Second Republic of Ghana on 1 October 1969, after being pronounced winner at the 1969 Ghanaian election held on 26 August 1969. and his tenure of office ended on 13 January 1972.

== Personal life ==
Dimbie is a Christian.

== Death ==
He died in 2014.
