= Edward Kofi Nkansah =

Ghanaian politician (born 1933)

Member of the Ghana Parliament for Atebubu
- In office 1969–1972
- Prime Minister: Kofi Abrefa Busia
- Preceded by: William Ntoso
- Succeeded by: ?

Personal details
- Born: 1933 Atebubu, Brong-Ahafo Region, Gold Coast

Edward Kofi Nkansah (born 1933) is a Ghanaian politician and was a member of the first parliament of the second Republic of Ghana. He represented the Atebubu constituency under the membership of the progress party (PP).

== Early life and education ==
Nkansah was born on 1933. He attended Nurses' Training College and Local Government Training School, Tamale. He worked as a Registered Nurse and Sales Supervisor before going to serve at the Parliament of Ghana.

== Personal life ==
Nkansah is a Christian.

== Politics ==
Nkansah began his political career in 1969 when he became the parliamentary candidate for the Progress Party (PP) to represent his constituency in the Brong Ahafo Region of Ghana prior to the commencement of the 1969 Ghanaian parliamentary election.

He was sworn into the First Parliament of the Second Republic of Ghana on 1 October 1969, after being pronounced winner at the 1969 Ghanaian election held on 26 August 1969. and his tenure ended on 13 January 1972.
