= Attah =

Attah is a surname. Notable people with the surname include:

- Abraham Attah (born 2002), Ghanaian actor
- Aliyu Attah, Nigerian policeman and former Inspector General of Police
- Ayesha Harruna Attah (born 1983), Ghanaian-born fiction writer
- Benjamin Ayesu-Attah (born 1993), Canadian sprinter
- Daniel Attah (born 1978), Nigerian professional boxer
- Ernest Attah, Military Governor of Cross River State, Nigeria
- Jordan Attah Kadiri (born 2000), Nigerian professional footballer
- Michael Kwame Attah, Ghanaian politician
- Mike Attah, Military Administrator of Anambra State in Nigeria
- Richard Attah (born 1995), Ghanaian professional footballer
- Samuel Attah-Mensah, Ghanaian media personality, businessman and lecturer
- Victor Attah (born 1938), Governor of Akwa Ibom State in Nigeria
