= Joseph Evarist Seyire =

Ghanaian politician

Member of the Ghana Parliament for Navrongo
- In office 1969–1972
- President: Kofi Abrefa Busia

Personal details
- Born: 17 October 1916 (age 109) Navrongo, Upper East Region, Gold Coast
- Education: St. Joseph's College of Education

Joseph Evarist Seyire was a Ghanaian politician and member of the first parliament of the second republic of Ghana representing Navrongo constituency under the membership of the Progress Party (PP).

== Early life and education ==
Seyire was born on 25 July 1942 in the Upper East region of Ghana. He attended Catholic Teacher Training College, Navrongo now St. Joseph's College of Education where he obtained his Teachers' Training Certificate. He was a businessman before going into parliament.

== Politics ==
Seyire began his political career in 1969 when he became the parliamentary candidate for the Progress Party (PP) to represent the Bolgatanga constituency prior to the commencement of the 1969 Ghanaian parliamentary election. He assumed office as a member of the first parliament of the second republic of Ghana on 1 October 1969 after being a pronounced winner at the 1969 Ghanaian parliamentary election. His tenure ended on 13 January 1972.

== Personal life ==
Seyire is a Christian.
