= Nana Toa Akwatia II =

Ghanaian politician (born 1924)

Member of the Ghana Parliament for Densuagya
- In office 1 October 1969 – 13 January 1972

Personal details
- Born: 3 May 1924 (age 102) Densuagya, Gold Coast, United Kingdom
- Education: University of Ghana

Nana Toa Akwatia II (born 3 May 1924) was a Ghanaian politician who was a member of the first parliament of the second Republic of Ghana. He represented the Densuagya constituency under the membership of the Progress Party (PP).

== Early life and education ==
Akwatia was born on 3 May 1924 in the Eastern region of Ghana. He attended Ghanata Secondary School now Ghanata Senior High School, Accra, Ghana and University of Ghana, Legon formerly The University College of the Gold Coast. He was a Traditional ruler before going into parliament.

== Politics ==
Akwatia began his political career in 1969 when he became the parliamentary candidate for the Progress Party (PP) to represent Densuagya constituency prior to the commencement of the 1969 Ghanaian parliamentary election. He assumed office as a member of the first parliament of the second republic of Ghana on 1 October 1969 after being pronounced winner at the 1969 Ghanaian parliamentary election. His tenure ended on 13 January 1972.

== Personal life ==
Akwatia was a Methodist.
