= Kingsley Abeyie =

Ghanaian politician

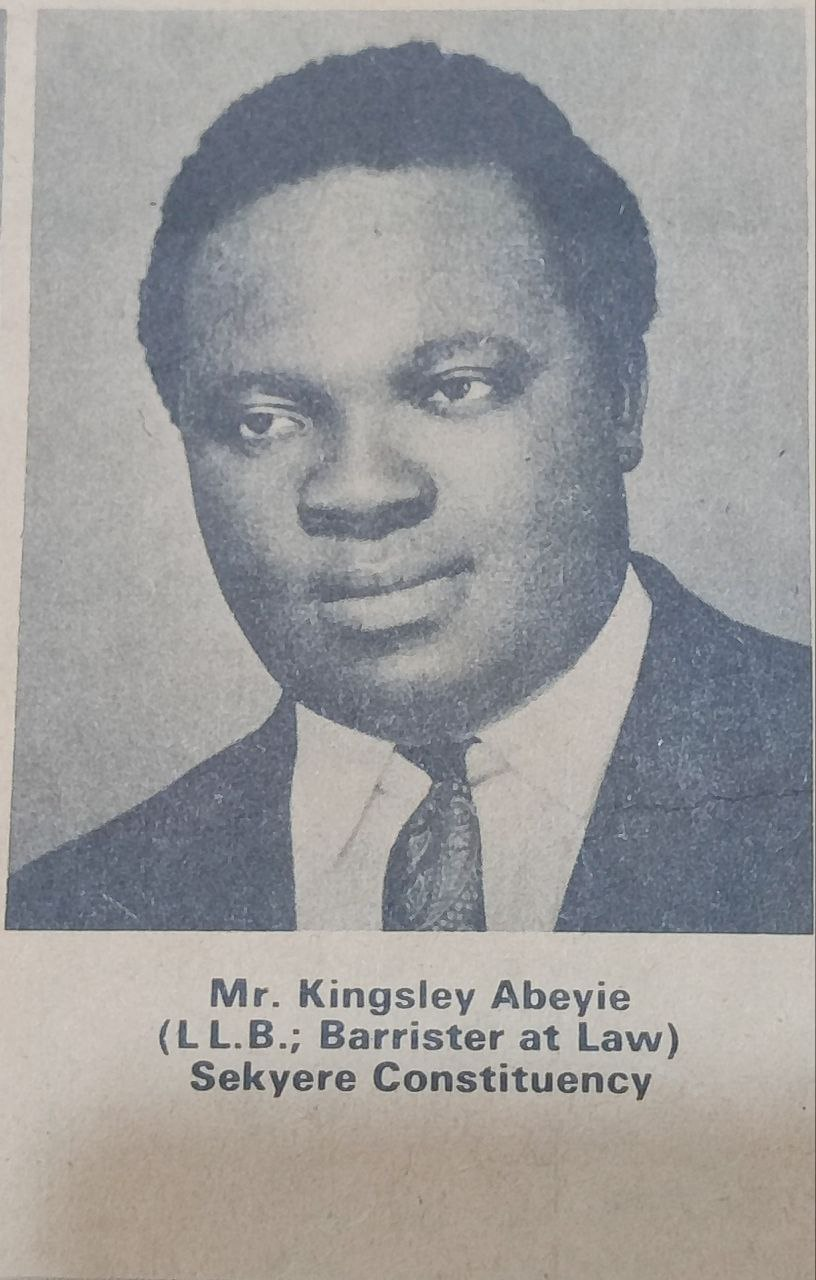
- Succeeded by: Reo Addai Basoah

Member of Parliament for Sekyere
- In office 1 October 1969 – 13 January 1972
- Preceded by: Krobo Edusei
- Succeeded by: Basoa Reo Addai

Personal details
- Born: Gold Coast (now Ghana)
- Party: Progress Party
- Occupation: Politician

Kingsley Abeyie was a Ghanaian politician and a former member of the 1st Parliament of the 2nd republic of Ghana. He was a member of parliament for the Sekyere Constituency in Ashanti Region.

== Career and politics ==
Abeyie was elected member of parliament for the Sekyere Constituency on the ticket of the Progress Party on 29 August 1969. During the 1969 parliamentary election, Abeyie polled 6369 votes against Paul Kwame Boateng of the National Alliance of Liberals who polled 885 votes. Abeyie was subsequently sworn into office as a member of the first parliament of the second republic on 1 October 1969. Abayie served as a member of parliament for the Sekyere Constituency from 1969 to 1972.
