= Anane Antwi-Kusi =

Ghanaian politician (born 1926)

Member of the Ghana Parliament for Tano
- In office 1969–1972

Personal details
- Born: 17 May 1926 Gold Coast
- Children: Patrick Antwi- Kusi
- Education: Wesley College of Education, Kumasi

Anane Antwi-Kusi (born 17 May 1926) was a Ghanaian politician and member of the first parliament of the second republic of Ghana representing Tano constituency under the membership of the Progress Party.

== Early life and education ==
Antwi-Kusi was born on 17 May 1926 at Duayaw Nkwanta in the Ahafo Region of Ghana. He attended St. Augustine's College for his secondary education, and Wesley College, Kumasi (now Wesley College of Education) where he obtained his Teachers' Training Certificate. He worked as a teacher before going into parliament.

== Politics ==
Antwi-Kusi began as a member of the Asante Youth Association. He was one of the earliest members of the association who suggested the formation of a new political party to Baffour Osei Akoto, and later became one of the founding members of the National Liberation Movement (NLM) party that was consequently formed. In 1969, he became the parliamentary candidate for the Progress Party (PP) to represent the Tano constituency prior to the commencement of the 1969 Ghanaian parliamentary election. He assumed office as a member of the first parliament of the second republic of Ghana on 1 October 1969 after being pronounced winner at the 1969 Ghanaian parliamentary election. While in parliament, Antwi-Kusi doubled as the deputy Minister for Lands and Mineral Resources. His tenure of office as a member of parliament and deputy Minister ended on 13 January 1972 when the Busia government was overthrown.

== Personal life ==
Antwi-Kusi was a Christian.
