= Theodore Kodjo Agadzi =

Ghanaian politician 1919–2005

Member of the Ghana Parliament for West Dayi
- In office 1969–1972
- Preceded by: Military government
- Succeeded by: Parliament dissolved

Personal details
- Born: 8 December 1919
- Died: 2005 (aged 85–86)
- Citizenship: Ghana
- Education: University of Edinburgh; Presbyterian College of Education, Akropong
- Occupation: Barrister and Solicitor

Theodore Kodjo Agadzi (8 December 1919 – 2005) was a Ghanaian politician and member of the first parliament of the second republic of Ghana representing West Dayi Constituency under the membership of the National Alliance of Liberals (NAL).

== Education and early life ==
He was born 8 December 1919 in Volta Region of Ghana. He attended Akropong Training College where he obtained Teachers' Training Certificate. He also obtained his Bachelor of Arts degree from The University of Edinburgh, United Kingdom and he also attended Middle Temple School.

== Politics ==
He began his political career in 1969 when he became the parliamentary candidate for the National Alliance of Liberals (NAL) to represent West Dayi constituency prior to the commencement of the 1969 Ghanaian parliamentary election. He assumed office as a member of the first parliament of the second republic of Ghana on 1 October 1969 after being pronounced winner at the 1969 Ghanaian parliamentary election and was later suspended following the overthrow of the Busia government on 13 January 1972.

== Personal life ==
He was a Presbyterian. He was a Barrister and Solicitor.

Agadzi died in 2005.

== See also ==
- Busia government
- List of MPs elected in the 1969 Ghanaian parliamentary election
