= Kwaku Sekyi-Appiah =

Ghanaian politician (born 1910)

Member of the Ghana Parliament for Asikuma-Brakwa
- In office 1969–1972
- Preceded by: Military government
- Succeeded by: Parliament dissolved

Personal details
- Born: 13 January 1910
- Died: 2001
- Citizenship: Ghana
- Education: Wesleyan School
- Occupation: Farmer and Businessman

Kwaku Sekyi-Appiah (born 13 January 1910, and died in 2001) was a Ghanaian politician who was a member of the first parliament of the second Republic of Ghana. He represented Asikuma-Brakwa constituency under the membership of the progress party (PP).

== Early life and education ==
Sekyi-Appiah was born on 13 January 1910. He attended Wesleyan School. He worked as a Farmer and Businessman before going into Parliament.

== Personal life ==
Sekyi-Appiah was a Christian.

== Politics ==
Sekyi-Appiah began his political career in 1969 when he became the parliamentary candidate for the Progress Party (PP) to represent his constituency in the Central Region of Ghana prior to the commencement of the 1969 Ghanaian parliamentary election.

Sekyi-Appiah was sworn into the First Parliament of the Second Republic of Ghana on 1 October 1969, after being pronounced winner at the 1969 Ghanaian election held on 26 August 1969 and was later suspended following the overthrow of the Busia government on 13 January 1972.

Sekyi-Appiah was the Chairman of the Odoben Town Investigation Committee in 1969.
