= Ernest Seth Yaney =

Ghanaian politician

Hon. Ernest Seth Yaney

Member of Parliament for Chereponi Saboba constituency
- In office 1 October 1969 – 13 January 1972
- Succeeded by: Samuel U. Dalafu

Personal details
- Party: Progress Party
- Occupation: Politician

Ernest Seth Yaney is a Ghanaian politician who served as member of the first parliament of the second republic for Chereponi Saboba constituency in the Northern Region of Ghana.

== Politics ==
Ernest Seth Yaney was elected during the 1969 Ghanaian parliamentary election on the ticket of the Progress Party (PP) as member of the first parliament of the second republic of Ghana. He was succeeded by Samuel U. Dalafu of the Popular Front Party (PFP) in the 1979 Ghanaian general election.
