= Stephen Kwadwo Osei-Nyame =

Ghanaian politician

Hon. Stephen Kwadwo Osei-Nyame

Member of Parliament for Akan constituency
- In office 1 October 1969 – 13 January 1972

Personal details
- Born: 24 May 1937 (age 89)
- Party: National Alliance of Liberals
- Education: Achimota School and University of Ghana
- Occupation: Politician
- Profession: Lawyer

Stephen Kwadwo Osei-Nyame is a Ghanaian politician and member of the first parliament of the second republic of Ghana representing Akan constituency in the Volta Region of Ghana under the membership of the National Alliance Liberals (NAL)

== Early life and education ==
Osei-Nyame was born on 24 May 1937. He attended Achimota School and the University of Ghana where he obtained Bachelor of Arts and bachelor of laws degree.

== Career and politics ==
Osei-Nyame worked as a lawyer before going into Parliament. He began his political career in 1969 when he became the parliamentary candidate to represent Akan constituency in the Volta Region of Ghana prior to the commencement of the 1969 Ghanaian parliamentary election.

He was sworn into the First Parliament of the Second Republic of Ghana on 1 October 1969, after being pronounced winner at the 1969 Ghanaian election held on 26 August 1969. and his tenure of office ended on 13 January 1972.

== Personal life ==
He is a Christian.
