= Isaac Lawrence Kumaning Mensah =

Ghanaian politician (born 1932)

Member of the Ghana Parliament for Bibiani
- In office 1969–1972
- Preceded by: Constituency merged
- Succeeded by: A. O. F. Tawiah

Personal details
- Born: 30 October 1932
- Citizenship: Ghana
- Education: University of London; Newham College of Further Education
- Occupation: Journalist

Isaac Lawrence Kumaning Mensah (born 30 October 1932) is a Ghanaian politician who was a member of the first parliament of the second republic of Ghana representing Bibiani constituency under the membership of the Progress Party.

== Early life and education ==
Mensah was born on 10 October 1932. He attended Westham College of Further Education (now Newham College of Further Education), and the University of London.He holds a Diploma in Public Administration, and a Diploma in Journalism. He later worked as a Journalist before going into Parliament.

== Personal life ==
Mensah is Anglican in faith.

== Politics ==
Mensah began his political career in 1969 when he became the parliamentary candidate for the Progress Party to represent the Bibiani constituency prior to the commencement of the 1969 Ghanaian parliamentary election.

He was sworn into the First Parliament of the Second Republic of Ghana on 1 October 1969, after being pronounced winner at the 1969 Ghanaian election held on 26 August 1969. His tenure of office as a member of parliament ended on 13 January 1972.
