= Benjamin Benson Ofori =

Ghanaian politician (born 1927)

Member of the Ghana Parliament for Afram
- In office 1969–1972
- President: Edward Akufo-Addo

Personal details
- Born: 18 October 1927 Afram, Eastern Region, Gold Coast
- Education: University of Ghana

Benjamin Benson Ofori (born 18 October 1927) is a Ghanaian politician who was a member of the first parliament of the second Republic of Ghana. He represented the Afram constituency under the membership of the Progress Party.

== Early life and education ==
Benjamin was born on 18 October 1927 in the Eastern region of Ghana. He attended Presbyterian College Of Education, Akropong formerly Akropong Presbyterian Training College where he obtained his Teachers' Training Certificate. He then moved to Accra to advance his education at the University of Ghana, Legon where he obtained his Bachelor of Arts degree with a specialization in Geography. He worked as a teacher before going into parliament.

== Politics ==
Benjamin began his political career in 1969 when he became the parliamentary candidate for the Progress Party (PP) to represent Afram constituency prior to the commencement of the 1969 Ghanaian parliamentary election. He assumed office as a member of the first parliament of the second republic of Ghana on 1 October 1969 after being pronounced winner at the 1969 Ghanaian parliamentary election. His tenure ended on 13 January 1972.

== Personal life ==
Benjamin was a Presbyterian.
