= Nkansah =

Nkansah is a Ghanaian surname. Notable people with the surname include:

- Alfred Badu Nkansah (born 1936), Ghanaian politician and teacher
- Edward Kofi Nkansah (born 1933), Ghanaian politician
- Elijah Nkansah (born 1994), American football player
- Emmanuel Kwesi Nkansah (born 1941), Ghanaian footballer
- Esther Nkansah (1948–2019), Ghanaian lawyer and politician
- Eugene Osafo-Nkansah (born 1983), Ghanaian journalist
- Kwadwo Nkansah (born 1987), Ghanaian artist, musician, actor and comedian
- Marian Asantewah Nkansah, Ghanaian scientist
- Mavis Nkansah Boadu (born 1989), Ghanaian politician
- Rosamond Asiamah Nkansah (1930–2021), Ghanaian police officer
- Steffen Nkansah (born 1996), German footballer
