= Alexander Apeatu Aboagye da Costa =

Ghanaian politician (born 1933)

Member of the Ghana Parliament for Asamankese
- In office 1969–1972
- Preceded by: Military government
- Succeeded by: Parliament dissolved

Personal details
- Born: 1933
- Citizenship: Ghana
- Education: University of Hull; University of Manchester
- Occupation: Lawyer

Alexander Apeatu Aboagye da Costa (born 1933) was a Ghanaian lawyer and politician. He was the deputy minister (ministerial secretary) for Youth and Rural Development, and deputy minister (ministerial secretary) for Labour and Co-operative during the second republic

== Early life and education ==
Alexander was born in 1933 at Asamankese in the Eastern Region of Ghana.

He had his early education at Asamankese Methodist school, Saltpond Methodist school and Kumasi Methodist school. He entered Mfantsipim School in 1948 and completed in 1951. He proceeded to the United Kingdom, where he studied law at the University of Hull, Hull from 1955 obtaining his bachelor of laws degree (LL.B.) in 1958. He had further studies in law at the University of Manchester, where he was awarded his master of laws (LL.M.) degree in 1960. He was called to the bar at the Middle Temple in 1961.

== Career and politics ==
Prior to politics he was a legal practitioner. He worked as a district magistrate in Accra, Cape Coast and Agona Swedru.

In 1969 he was elected member of parliament to represent the Asamankese constituency on the ticket of the Progress Party. That same year he was appointed deputy minister for Youth and Rural Development. He served together with Carl Daniel Reindorf as deputy minister for the ministry; he was responsible for rural development while Carl was responsible for the youth department of the ministry. In 1971 he was moved to the ministry of Labour and Co-operatives to serve as its deputy minister. He served in this capacity until 1972 when the Busia government was overthrown.

== Personal life ==
Da Costa was married to Nanette, and together they had three children. His hobbies included motoring and gardening.

== See also ==
- List of MPs elected in the 1969 Ghanaian parliamentary election
- Busia government
