= Yisifu Yinusa =

Ghanaian politician

Hon. Yisifu Yinusa

Member of Parliament for Mion-Nanton constituency
- In office 1 October 1969 – 13 January 1972
- Succeeded by: Oliver Sigli Mahamudu

Personal details
- Born: 1941 (age 84–85)
- Party: National Alliance of Liberals
- Education: Yendi Middle School and Local Government Training School
- Occupation: Politician
- Profession: Farmer

Yisifu Yinusa is a Ghanaian politician and member of the first Parliament of the Second Republic of Ghana representing Mion-Nanton constituency in the Northern Region of Ghana under the membership of the National Alliance Liberals (NAL).

== Early life and education ==
Yisifu was born in 1941 and lived in Yendi, a town in the Northern Region of Ghana. He attended Yendi Middle School and Local Government Training School, where he obtained a Middle School Certificate and General Certificate of Education (G.C.E) Ordinary level respectively in sales promotion and office management and later worked as a farmer before going into Parliament.

== Politics ==
He began his political career in 1969 when he became the parliamentary candidate to represent his constituency (Mion Nanton) in the Northern Region of Ghana before the 1969 Ghanaian parliamentary election.

He was sworn into the First Parliament of the Second Republic of Ghana on 1 October 1969, after being pronounced the winner at the 1969 Ghanaian election held on 26 August 1969. His tenure of office ended on 13 January 1972. He was succeeded by Oliver Sigli Mahamudu of the Social Democratic Front elected during the 1979 Ghanaian general election.
