= Joseph Kofi Amankwah =

Ghanaian politician

Member of the Ghana Parliament for Wenchi West
- In office 1969–1972
- Preceded by: New
- Succeeded by: Joseph K. Amankwah

Personal details
- Born: 1934 (age 91–92) Gold Coast
- Occupation: Social Worker

Joseph Kofi Amankwah (born 1934) is a Ghanaian politician and member of the first parliament of the second republic of Ghana representing the Wenchi West constituency under the membership of the Progress Party.

== Early life and education ==
Amankwah was born in 1934. He attended School of Social Welfare, Accra where he obtained his G.C.E Advance level Certificate in Social Work and Probation Services. He worked as a social worker before going into parliament.

== Politics ==
Amankwah was nominated candidate for the Progress Party (PP) to represent Wenchi West constituency prior to the commencement of the 1969 Ghanaian parliamentary election. He assumed office as a member of the first parliament of the second republic of Ghana on 1 October 1969 after being pronounced winner at the 1969 Ghanaian parliamentary election. His tenure of office as a member of parliament ended on 13 January 1972.

== Personal life ==
Amankwah is a Christian.
