= Abura-Asebu (Ghana parliament constituency) =

Ghana parliament constituency

Coordinates: 5°15′0″N 1°12′0″W

- constituency for the Parliament of Ghana
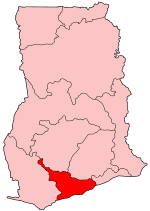
- District: Abura/Asebu/Kwamankese District
- Region: Central Region of Ghana

Current constituency
- Party: National Democratic Congress
- MP: Anthony Christian Dadzie

Abura-Asebu is one of the constituencies represented in the Parliament of Ghana. It elects one Member of Parliament (MP) by the first past the post system of election. Abura-Asebu is located in the Abura/Asebu/Kwamankese district of the Central Region of Ghana.

== Boundaries ==
The seat is located entirely within the Abura/Asebu/Kwamankese district of the Central Region of Ghana.

== Members of Parliament ==
Election	Member	Party
1992	Vincent K Turkson	National Convention Party
1996	Ato Quarshie	National Democratic Congress
2000	Harry Halifax-Hayford	National Democratic Congress
2004	Andrew Kingsford Mensah	New Patriotic Party
2008	Anthony Christian Dadzie	National Democratic Congress

== Elections ==
2008 Ghanaian parliamentary election: Abura-Asebu Source:Electoral Commission of Ghana
Party	Candidate	Votes	%	±%
National Democratic Congress	Anthony Christian Dadzie	19,775	56.0	13.2
New Patriotic Party	Maxwell Knoxwell Baidoo	13,221	37.5	−15.9
Convention People's Party	Francis Eduakoh	2,050	5.8	2.0
Democratic Freedom Party	Kwame Edu Ofori	241	0.7	—
Majority		6,554	18.5	7.9
Turnout		36,216	68.8	−13.0

2004 Ghanaian parliamentary election: Abura-Asebu Source:Electoral Commission of Ghana
Party	Candidate	Votes	%	±%
New Patriotic Party	Andrew Kingsford Mensah	19,196	53.4	12.2
National Democratic Congress	Augustine Solomon Ekyefi	15,377	42.8	−2.1
Convention People's Party	Victor Nana Kobina Gyan	1,350	3.8	−4.6
Majority		15,554	10.6	6.9
Turnout		36,153	81.8	—

2000 Ghanaian parliamentary election: Abura-Asebu Source:Adam Carr's Election Archives
Party	Candidate	Votes	%	±%
National Democratic Congress	Harry Halifax-Hayford	13,661	44.9	−15.4
New Patriotic Party	Andrew Kingsford Mensah	12,541	41.2	2.2
Convention People's Party	Raymond Nonnatus Osei	2,570	8.4	—
National Reform Party	Joshua Alfred Amuah	1,093	3.6	—
People's National Convention	Richard Korbla Ametorwo	321	1.0	—
United Ghana Movement	Peter Yeboah	263	0.9	—
Majority		1,120	3.7	−17.6
Turnout		—	—	—

1996 Ghanaian parliamentary election: Abura-Asebu Source:Electoral Commission of Ghana
Party	Candidate	Votes	%	±%
National Democratic Congress	J. E. Afful	20,262	60.3	—
New Patriotic Party	Andrew Kingsford Mensah	13,088	39.0	—
People's Convention Party	Emmanuel F. Appiah-Kubi	235	0.7	—
Majority		7,174	21.3	—
Turnout		33,585	73.1	47.5

1992 Ghanaian parliamentary election: Abura-Asebu Source:Electoral Commission of Ghana
Party	Candidate	Votes	%	±%
National Convention Party	Vincent K. Turkson	—	—	—
Majority		—	—	—
Turnout		13,639	25.6	—

== See also ==
- List of Ghana Parliament constituencies
- Abura/Asebu/Kwamankese District
