= Gbewaa College of Education =

Teacher training college in Upper East region, Ghana

- Established: 1953
- Affiliations: Government of Ghana
- Location: Pusiga-Bawku, Pusiga District (Bawku Municipal District), UP0085, Ghana; 11.06708°N 0.11491°W
- Language: English
- Region Zone: Upper East Region; Northern Zone
- Source: An Atlas of The Forty Colleges of Education in Ghana.

Gbewaa College of Education is a teacher education college in Pusiga-Bawku (Pusiga District / Bawku Municipal District, Upper East Region, Ghana). Located in Northern Zone, the school was set up in 1953 and affiliated to the University of Ghana. It is one of the 46 public colleges of education in Ghana.

The college participated in the DFID-funded T-TEL programme. For the 2016–2017 academic year, the school admitted 560 students into Diploma in Education course.

== History ==
Government Training College Pusiga which is now Gbewaa College of Education was established in 1953. It was built on a land that only became part of Ghana after the 1956 plebiscite. Until then, that part of Ghana was called Trans-Volta Togoland.

In September 1953, the College admitted 14 male students, to start the Certificate ‘B’ course. They were handled by 7 male tutors including the Principal. It remained a male Institution until 1976, when it became a mixed college.

The College has produced good sportsmen and women. Gbewaa College of Education won a prize from World Education/USAID for embarking on a successful Anti HIV/Aids Campaign in 2006.

List of principals since the establishment of the college include:
Name	Years served
E H. Nicholson (Founder)	Sept. 1953 - Dec. 1956
Mr. Kaleem	Dec. 1956 - Apr. 1957
E. H. Nicholson	Apr. 1957 - Nov. 1958
H. B. Bending	May 1958 - Nov. 1960
I. K. Adjei	Jan. 1961 - Nov. 1965
J. H. Banniah	Nov. 1965 - Nov. 1970
M. J. Anaman	Nov. 1970 - Nov. 1979
C. V. Teview	Nov. 1979 - Nov. 1983
Jacob I. Y. Asigri	Apr. 1983 - Jun. 1987
A. A. Abem	Jun. 1987 - Oct. 1988
Kwaku Acqua Jnr.	Oct. 1988 - Jan. 1992
J. B. Larry	Jan. 1992 - Nov. 1995
Luke Abugri	Nov. 1995

== Programmes ==
The programmes of the College since its establishment include:

- Certificate ‘B’ Post Middle 1954 - 1964
- Certificate ‘A’ Post Middle 1964 - 1991
- Cert ‘A’ Three Year Post Secondary 1992 - 2004
- Diploma in Basic Education 2004 -
- Distance Education Programme in Basic Education for Untrained Teachers 2005 - 2009 for the award of:

i. Diploma in Basic Education

ii. Certificate ‘A’ four - year

== Notable alumni ==
The College has produced academic giants for the nation. Some of them are:

- Prof. Nabilla, member of Council of State
- Dr. Kwabena Adjei, N.D.C. National Chairman
- Dr. Abdulai, Principal Tamale Polytechnic
- Dr. Golfred Tangu, Minister of State in charge of Roads
- Dr. Dominic Donile, NCCE, Accra
- Prof. Saaka
- Hon. Awudu Yirimenya, Dep. Minister of Local Government
- Mr. B.L. Baba, LOC, Accra
- Sharlotte Azorago, 2004 National Best Teacher.
- Rev. Eddie Eyison, National Treasurer Musicians Union of Ghana. Musiga
