= Aburi-Nsawam (Ghana parliament constituency) =

Ghana parliament constituency

- constituency for the Parliament of Ghana
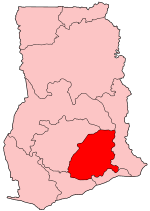
- District: Akuapim North District
- Region: Eastern Region of Ghana

Current constituency
- Party: New Patriotic Party
- MP: Osei Bonsu Amoah

Osei Bonsu Amoah is the member of parliament for the constituency. He was elected on the ticket of the New Patriotic Party (NPP), and won a majority of 12,297 votes to become the MP. He succeeded Magnus Opare-Asamoah who had represented the constituency in the 4th Republic parliament on the ticket of the New Patriotic Party (NPP).

== See also ==
- List of Ghana Parliament constituencies
