= National Alliance of Liberals =

- Leader: Komla Gbedemah
- Deputy Leader: Eric Madjitey
- Founded: 1969
- Dissolved: 13 January 1972
- Headquarters: Accra
- Ideology: Liberalism
- 2nd Republic Parliament: 29 seats

The National Alliance of Liberals (NAL) was a political party in Ghana during the Second Republic (1969–1972). The party was formed after the ban on party politics was lifted in May 1969 and was dissolved along with all other political parties in Ghana following the coup d'état that replaced the Busia government with the National Redemption Council led by Colonel Acheampong.

== Leadership ==
Komla Agbeli Gbedemah was the founder and leader of the party. Gbedemah however failed to win a seat during the 1969 Ghanaian parliamentary election so Eric Madjitey became the leader within parliament.

== Parliamentary elections ==
In elections held on 29 August 1969, the NAL won 29 out of 140 seats in the National Assembly.

Election	Number of NAL votes	Share of votes	Seats	+/–	Position	Outcome
1969	463,401	30.81%	29 / 140	▲29	▲2nd	Opposition
