= Kofi Abrefa Busia =

Prime Minister of Ghana from 1969 to 1972

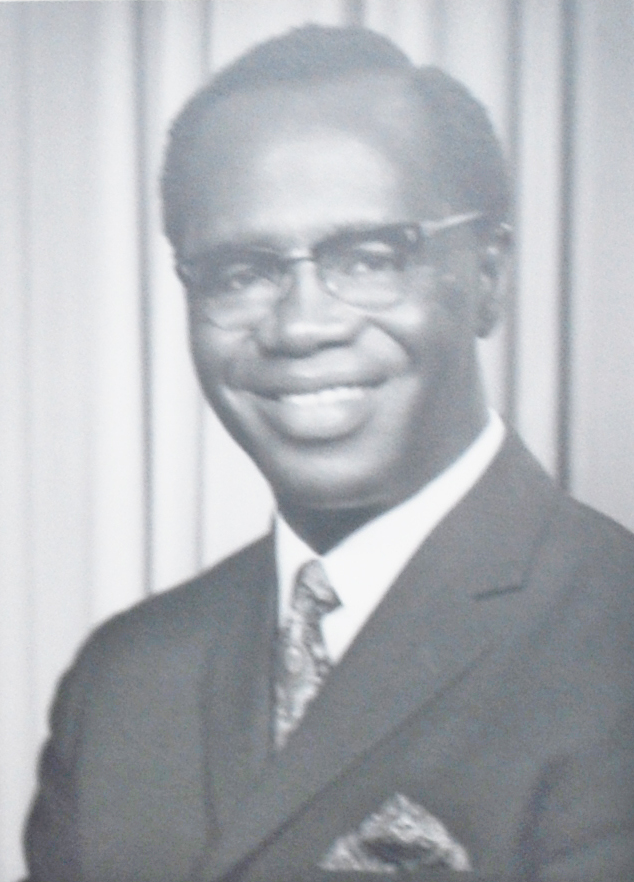

2nd Prime Minister of Ghana
- In office 1 October 1969 – 13 January 1972
- President: Akwasi Afrifa; Raphael Nii Amaa Ollennu; Edward Akufo-Addo
- Preceded by: Office re-established; Kwame Nkrumah (1957)
- Succeeded by: Office abolished

Political leader and De facto chief executive
- In office 7 August 1970 – 13 January 1972
- President: Raphael Nii Amaa Ollennu; Edward Akufo-Addo
- Prime Minister: Himself
- Preceded by: Akwasi Afrifa (as Chairman of the Presidential Commission)
- Succeeded by: Ignatius Kutu Acheampong (as Chairman National Redemption Council)

Personal details
- Born: 11 July 1913 Wenchi, Gold Coast
- Died: 28 August 1978 (aged 65) Oxford, England
- Party: Progress Party
- Spouse(s): Helena Poku; Naa Morkor Busia (1924-2010)
- Children: 8, including Abena and Akosua
- Education: Methodist School, Wenchi; Mfantsipim School, Cape Coast; Wesley College, Kumasi; Achimota College
- Alma mater: University of London; University College, Oxford; Nuffield College, Oxford
- Profession: Academic
- Elected following military rule and overthrown by military coup

Kofi Abrefa Busia (11 July 1913 – 28 August 1978) was a Ghanaian political leader and academic who was Prime Minister of Ghana from 1969 to 1972. As a leader and prime minister, he helped to restore civilian government to the country following military rule. He was overthrown in a military coup in 1972.

== Early life and education ==
Busia was born in Wenchi, a town in the Brong Ahafo Region (now called Bono Region). Wenchi is now in the Bono region

He was educated at Methodist School, Wenchi, Mfantsipim School, Cape Coast, then at Wesley College, Kumasi, from 1931 to 1932. He taught at Wesley College and left to study at Achimota College in 1935 and taught there. He gained his first degree with Honours in Medieval and Modern History from the University of London, through correspondence during this period. He then went on to study at University College, Oxford. He returned to the Gold Coast in 1942. He took a BA (Hons) in Philosophy, Politics, and Economics (1941, MA 1946) and a DPhil in Social Anthropology in 1947 at Nuffield College, Oxford, with a thesis entitled "The position of the chief in the modern political system of Ashanti: a study of the influence of contemporary social changes on Ashanti political institutions". He was a Fulbright scholar in 1954.

== Political career ==
Busia served as a district commissioner from 1942 to 1949, and was appointed first lecturer in African Studies. He became the first African to occupy a chair at the University College of the Gold Coast (now the University of Ghana). In 1951 he was elected by the Ashanti Confederacy to the Legislative Council. In 1952, he was Leader of Ghana Congress Party, which later merged with the other opposition parties to form the United Party (UP).

As leader of the opposition against Kwame Nkrumah, he fled the country on the grounds that his life was under threat. In 1959, Busia became a professor of Sociology and Culture of Africa at the University of Leiden near the Hague, Netherlands. From 1962 until 1969, he was a Fellow of St Antony's College, Oxford.

He returned to Ghana in March 1966, after Nkrumah's government was overthrown by the military, to serve on the National Liberation Council (NLC) of General Joseph Ankrah, the military head of state; and was appointed as the Chairman of the National Advisory Committee of the NLC. In 1967/68, Busia served as the Chairman of the Centre for Civic Education. He used this opportunity to promote himself as the next leader. He also was a Member of the Constitutional Review Committee. When the NLC lifted the ban on politics, Busia, together with Lawyer Sylvester Kofi Williams and friends in the defunct UP formed the Progress Party (PP).

In 1969, the PP won the parliamentary elections with 105 of the 140 seats. This paved the way for him to become the next prime minister. Due to memories of Nkrumah's authoritarian rule, the country opted for a parliamentary system with the president effectively reduced to a figurehead with the real power vested in the Prime Minister. Thus, as prime minister, Busia was Ghana's political leader and de facto chief executive, with Edward Akufo-Addo as figurehead president.

Busia continued with NLC's anti-Nkrumaist stance and adopted a liberalised economic system. There was a mass deportation of half a million Nigerian citizens from Ghana, and a 44 percent devaluation of the cedi in 1971, which met with a lot of resistance from the public.

While he was in Britain for a medical check-up, the army under Colonel Ignatius Kutu Acheampong overthrew his government on 13 January 1972. Busia remained in exile in England and returned to Oxford University, where he died from a heart attack in August 1978.

Busia's name is associated with Ghana's political right, along with J. B. Danquah and S. D. Dombo. The New Patriotic Party has claimed the Danquah-Busia-Dombo mantle in the Fourth Republic.

== Bibliography ==
- The Position of the Chief in the Modern Political System of Ashanti. London, 1951 (orig. dissertation, Oxford)
- The Sociology and Culture of Africa. Leiden, 1960
- The Challenge of Africa. New York, 1962
- Purposeful Education for Africa. The Hague, 1964
- Urban Churches in Britain. London, 1966
- Africa in Search of Democracy. London, 1967

Political offices
Preceded by Kwame Nkrumah as Prime Minister	Prime Minister of Ghana; 1969–1972	Succeeded by None; Position abolished
Parliament of Ghana
New title	Leader of the Opposition; 1952 – ?	Succeeded by ?
Parliament suspended by military	Member of Parliament for Wenchi East; 1969–1972^{1}	Parliament suspended after military coup
Party political offices
New title	Leader of the Ghana Congress Party; 1952–1957	Succeeded by ?
New title	Leader of the United Party; 1957 – ?	Succeeded by ?
New title	Leader of the Progress Party; 1969–1972	Parties banned after coup
Notes and references
1. Ghana@50
