= Edward Akufo-Addo =

President of Ghana from 1970 to 1972

Edward Akufo-Addo JSC
- Edward Akufo-Addo

4th President of Ghana
- In office 31 August 1970 – 13 January 1972
- Prime Minister: Kofi Abrefa Busia
- Preceded by: Nii Amaa Ollennu (acting)
- Succeeded by: Ignatius Kutu Acheampong (as Head of State)

3rd Chief Justice of Ghana
- In office 1966–1970
- Preceded by: J. Sarkodee-Addo
- Succeeded by: Edmund Alexander Lanquaye Bannerman

Justice of the Supreme Court of Ghana
- In office 1962–1964
- President: Kwame Nkrumah

Personal details
- Born: 26 June 1906 Dodowa, Gold Coast
- Died: 17 July 1979 (aged 73) Accra, Ghana
- Party: Independent; United Gold Coast Convention
- Spouse: Adeline Y. Akufo-Addo (née Nana Yeboakua Ofori-Atta) (d. 2004)
- Children: 4, including Nana Akufo-Addo
- Education: Presbyterian Training College, Akropong; Achimota College; St Peter's College, Oxford; Middle Temple
- Profession: Judge; Lawyer
- Religion: Presbyterian
- Ceremonial President with executive powers vested in Prime Minister

Edward Akufo-Addo JSC (26 June 1906 – 17 July 1979) was a Ghanaian politician and lawyer. He was a member of the "Big Six" leaders of the United Gold Coast Convention (UGCC) and one of the founding fathers of Ghana who engaged in the fight for Ghana's independence. He became the Chief Justice (1966–70), and later ceremonial President (1970–72), of the Republic of Ghana. He is the father of the former (executive) President of Ghana, Nana Addo Akufo-Addo.

== Early life and education ==
Akufo-Addo was born on 26 June 1906 at Dodowa in the Greater Accra Region to William Martin Addo-Danquah and Theodora Amuafi. Both of his parents were from the southern Ghanaian town of Akropong. He had his primary education at Presbyterian Primary and Middle Schools at Akropong. He continued to Presbyterian Training College, Akropong and Abetifi Theological Training College. In 1929, he entered Achimota College, where he won a scholarship to St Peter's College, Oxford. He studied mathematics, Politics and Philosophy and he went on to graduate with honours in philosophy and politics in 1933.

== Pre-political career ==
Akufo-Addo was called to the Middle Temple Bar, London, UK, in 1940 and returned to what was then the Gold Coast to start a private legal practice a year later in Accra.

== Early political career ==
In 1947, he became a founding member of the United Gold Coast Convention (UGCC) and was one of the "Big Six" (the others being Ebenezer Ako-Adjei, Joseph Boakye Danquah, Kwame Nkrumah, Emmanuel Obetsebi-Lamptey and William Ofori Atta) detained after disturbances in Accra in 1948. From 1949 to 1950, he was a member of the Gold Coast Legislative Council and the Coussey Constitutional Commission.

== Post-independence career ==
After independence (1962–64), Akufo-Addo was a Supreme Court Judge, one of three judges who sat on the treason trial involving Tawia Adamafio, Ako Adjei and three others after the Kulungugu bomb attack on President Kwame Nkrumah and for doing so was dismissed with fellow judges for finding some of the accused not guilty.

From 1966 to 1970, Akufo-Addo was appointed Chief Justice by the National Liberation Council (NLC) regime, as well as Chairman of the Constitutional Commission (which drafted the 1969 Second Republican Constitution). He was also head of the NLC Political Commission during this same time period.

From 31 August 1970 until his deposition by coup d'état on 13 January 1972, Akufo-Addo was President of Ghana in the Second Republic. His role was largely ceremonial, with real power vested in the prime minister, Dr Kofi Abrefa Busia. On 17 July 1979, Akufo-Addo died of natural causes.

== Personal life ==
Adeline Yeboakwa Akufo-Addo was the wife of Edward Akufo-Addo and they had four children.

== Awards and honors ==
- Honorary Doctorate from the University of Oxford in 1971.

== See also ==
- The Big Six
- List of judges of the Supreme Court of Ghana
- Chief Justice of Ghana
- Heads of state of Ghana

Legal offices
| Preceded by J. Sarkodee-Addo | Chief Justice of Ghana; 1966–1970 | Succeeded by Edmund A.L. Bannerman |
Political offices
| Preceded by Nii Amaa Ollennu | President of Ghana; 1970–1972 | Succeeded by Gen. I. K. Acheampong |
