= 1969 Ghanaian parliamentary election =

- 29 August 1969

All 140 seats in the National Assembly 71 seats needed for a majority
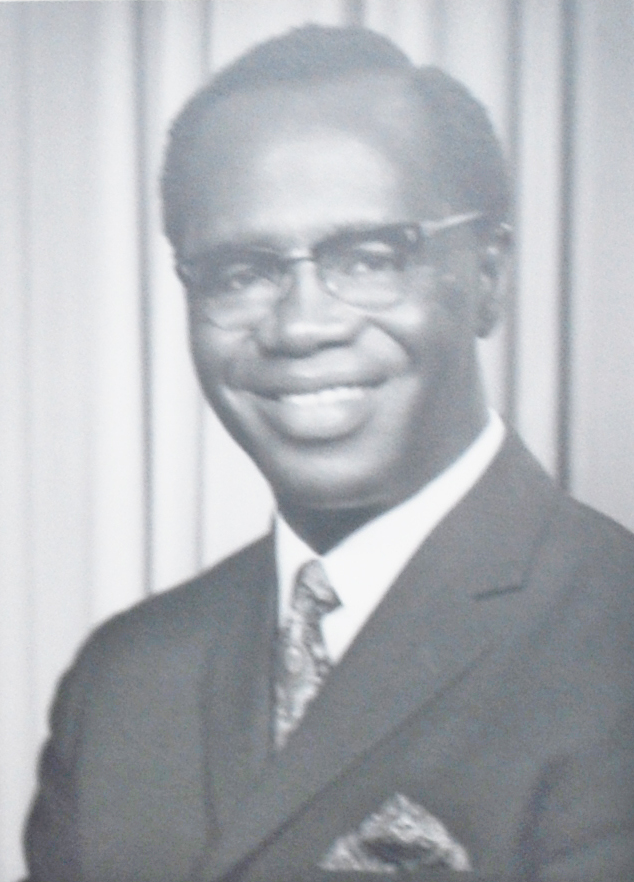

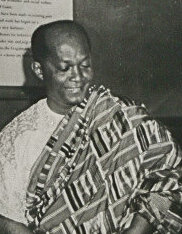
	First party	Second party
Leader	Kofi Abrefa Busia	Komla Agbeli Gbedemah
Party	Progress Party	NAL
Seats won	105	29
Popular vote	877,310	463,401
Percentage	58.33%	30.81%

Parliamentary elections were held in Ghana on 29 August 1969, the first since the 1966 coup by the National Liberation Council which toppled the Nkrumah government.

Voters elected the new 140-seat Parliament. Kofi Abrefa Busia, the leader of the Progress Party (which won 105 of the 140 seats) became Prime Minister. There were no presidential elections, as the system adopted was a parliamentary republic. Instead, a ceremonial president, Edward Akufo-Addo, was elected by an electoral college.

== Results ==
Party	Votes	%	Seats
Progress Party	877,310	58.33	105
National Alliance of Liberals	463,401	30.81	29
United Nationalist Party	57,652	3.83	2
People's Action Party	51,125	3.40	2
All People's Republican Party	27,328	1.82	1
Independents	27,216	1.81	1
Total	1,504,032	100.00	140
Registered voters/turnout	2,361,462	–	
Source: IPU

=== By region ===
Party	Ashanti	Brong Ahafo	Central	Eastern	Greater Accra	Northern	Upper	Volta	Western	Total Seats
Progress Party	22	13	15	18	3	9	13	2	10	105
National Alliance of Liberals	0	0	0	4	3	5	3	14	0	29
United Nationalist Party	0	0	0	0	2	0	0	0	0	2
People's Action Party	0	0	0	0	0	0	0	0	2	2
All People's Republican Party	0	0	0	0	0	0	0	0	1	1
Independents	0	0	0	0	1	0	0	0	0	1
National Total	22	13	15	22	9	14	16	16	13	140
Source: UNRISD

== See also ==
- List of MPs elected in the 1969 Ghanaian parliamentary election
- Busia government
