= Progress Party (Ghana) =

- Leader: Kofi Abrefa Busia
- President: Edward Akufo-Addo
- Chairman: Sylvester Kofi Williams
- Founded: 1969
- Dissolved: 13 January 1972
- Succeeded by: Popular Front Party
- Headquarters: Accra
- Ideology: Liberalism
- 2nd Republic: 105

The Progress Party (PP) was the ruling party in Ghana during the Second Republic (1969–1972). In the 29 August 1969 elections, the PP won 105 of the National Assembly's 140 seats.

== History ==
=== Founding and leadership ===
The party was co-founded in 1969 by Kofi Abrefa Busia, who was born as a Bono prince in the traditional kingdom of Wenchi, and by Lawyer Sylvester Kofi Williams, who was born as an Ahanta prince, and a descendant of the Ahanta King Badu Bonsu II. Kofi Abrefa Busia led the Party, and became the 2nd Prime Minister on 3 September 1969. Sylvester Kofi Williams, served as the ruling Party's Ambassador Extraordinary and Plenipotentiary, in Ghana's 2nd republic, quasi civilian government. The PP declared support for apartheid South Africa's white minority government.

=== Overthrow and ban ===
On 13 January 1972, the Progress Party government led by Busia was overthrown through a bloodless military coup led by Colonel Acheampong. The party together with all other political parties were banned.

== Fate of the founders ==
=== Exile and death of Kofi Busia ===
After the 1972 military junta banned the Progress Party in Ghana, both Busia and Williams lost their citizenship in Ghana and remained in exile in England. Busia returned to Oxford University, where he died from a heart attack in August 1978.

=== Post-exile career of Sylvester Kofi Williams ===
Sylvester Kofi Williams remained in exile in England for only a year before he was sent on mission by the Commonwealth Secretariat to serve as the Chief Parliamentary Draftsman of the Republic of Zambia, from 1973 - 1984. During his mission in Zambia, Williams participated in the 1979 Commonwealth Heads of Government Meeting in Lusaka, that laid the foundation for the dismantling of the Ian Smith regime in Southern Rhodesia, which resulted in the signing of the Lancaster House Agreement at Lancaster House in the United Kingdom. In recognition of his contribution to the 1979 CHOGM conference and the coming of Independence to the new Southern African nation of Zimbabwe, he was contracted by the United Nations Development Programme to co-write the post Independence Constitution of Zimbabwe and served as the Senior Legal Advisor to the Zimbabwean Government led by President Canaan Banana and Robert Mugabe from 1984 until 1991. After his contract with the UNDP came to an end on 31 December 1991, Sylvester Kofi Williams was tragically assassinated by multiple gun shots in Lusaka, when he traveled from Harare to Zambia to enact part of his final separation duties with the UNDP on 5 September 1992.

== Policies and ideology ==
The PP's rule was characterised by rising inflation, a mass depreciation of the Ghana cedi, the mass deportation of Africans from other African countries living in Ghana and an endorsement of the apartheid government of South Africa.

== See also ==
- United Party (Ghana)

| Preceded by National Liberation Council | Governments of Ghana (Second Republic); Busia government 1969–1972 | Succeeded by National Redemption Council |
