= Osei Kyei-Mensah-Bonsu =

Ghanaian politician (born 1957)

Hon. Osei Kyei Mensah Bonsu
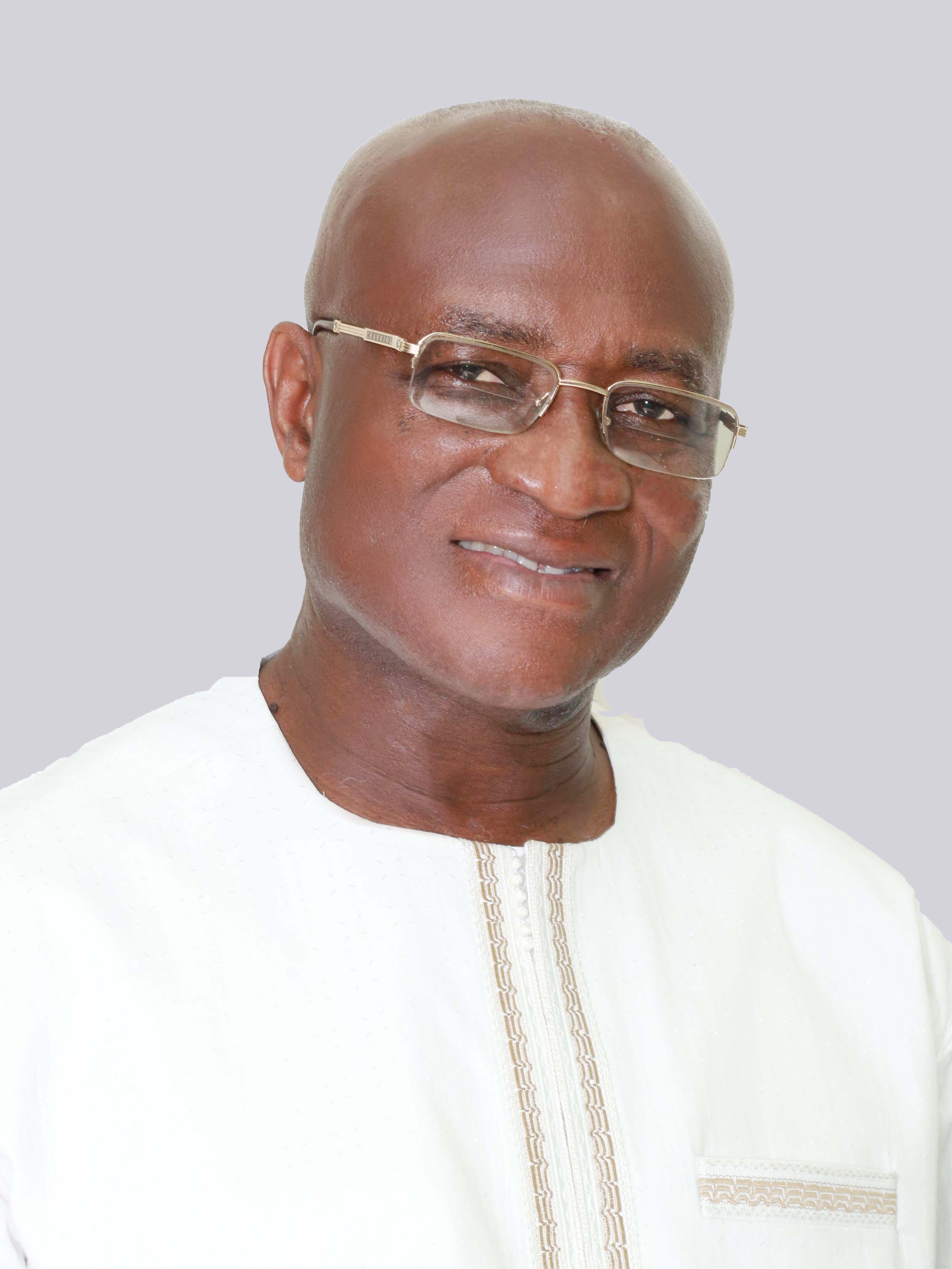

Member of Parliament for Suame Constituency
- In office 7 January 1997 – 6 January 2025
- Succeeded by: John Darko

Minister for Parliamentary Affairs
- In office 2017–2024
- President: Nana Akufo-Addo

Personal details
- Born: 3 February 1957 (age 69)
- Party: New Patriotic Party
- Education: Kwame Nkrumah University of Science and Technology
- Profession: Urban Planner, Politician
- Committees: Business Committee, Committee of Selection, Special Budget Committee, Standing Orders Committee, Works and Housing Committee

Osei Kyei Mensah Bonsu (previously known as Lawrence Addae; born on February 3, 1957) is a Ghanaian urban planner and politician. He was the majority leader in the Ghanaian Parliament until he stepped down on 21 February 2024 and is the Minister for Parliamentary Affairs in Ghana. He is the longest serving lawmaker in Ghana.

== Early life and education ==
Osei Kyei-Mensah Bonsu was born on Sunday, February 3, 1957. He hails from Bremang-Afrancho, a town in Kumasi, Ashanti Region. In 1982, he graduated from the Kwame Nkrumah University of Science and Technology with a Bachelor of Science degree in Urban Planning. He is a Development Planner/Architect/Quantity Surveyor.

== Political career ==
Osei Kyei Mensah is a member of the New Patriotic Party. He first became a member of the Parliament in January 1997, representing the people of Old Tafo, in the Suame Constituency of the Ashanti Region. He has kept his seat since then, representing his constituency in the 2nd, 3rd, 4th, 5th, 6th, 7th and 8th Parliaments of the 4th Republic of Ghana. He was the chairperson for the Special Budget, House, and Business Committees. He was also a member of the Finance, Mines and Energy Standing Orders and Selection Committees. He criticized the Speaker of the Ghanaian Parliament, Alban Bagbin, for suspending parliamentary proceedings to attend the 2023 National Development Conference hosted by the Church of Pentecost.

In August 2023, he provided a prediction that 70% of the NPP voters who will vote in the flagbearer super delegate congress will be in favor of the Vice President Bawumia After the election was over, Bawumia took the lead with 68% which was nearly 70% as predicted. The Suame member of parliament, Osei Kyei-Mensah-Bonsu, in February 2024 formally announced his retirement from his position as majority leader.

== Elections ==
=== 1996 Parliamentary Elections ===
Osei was first elected to Parliament during the 1996 Ghanaian General Elections on the Ticket of the New Patriotic Party representing the Suame Constituency in the Ashanti Region of Ghana. He polled 47,455 votes out of the 64,394 valid votes cast representing 57.40% against Paul Yeboah an NDC member who polled 10,828 votes, Azong Alhassan a PNC member who polled 3,219 votes and Habiba Atta a CPP member who polled 2,892 votes.

=== 2004 Parliamentary Elections ===
Osei was elected as the member of parliament for the Suame constituency of the Ashanti Region of Ghana in the 2004 Ghanaian general elections. He won on the ticket of the New Patriotic Party. His constituency was a part of the 36 parliamentary seats out of 39 seats won by the New Patriotic Party in that election for the Ashanti Region. The New Patriotic Party won a majority total of 128 parliamentary seats out of 230 seats. He was elected with 48,500 votes out of 59,039 total valid votes cast. This was equivalent to 82.1% of total valid votes cast. He was elected over Agonno Sampson Young of the People's National Convention, Paul Richard Kofi Yeboah of the National Democratic Congress and Frederick Antwi of the Convention People's Party. These obtained 934, 8,448 and 1,157 votes respectively of total valid votes cast. These were equivalent to 1.6%, 14.3% and 2% respectively of total valid votes cast.

=== 2008 Parliamentary Elections ===
In 2008, he won the general elections on the ticket of the New Patriotic Party for the same constituency. His constituency was part of the 34 parliamentary seats out of 39 seats won by the New Patriotic Party in that election for the Ashanti Region. The New Patriotic Party won a minority total of 109 parliamentary seats out of 230 seats. He was elected with 45,235 votes out of 57,765 total valid votes cast. This was equivalent to 78.31% of total valid votes cast. He was elected over David Osei Manu of the National Democratic Congress, Ameyaw Aboagye Peter of Democratic People's Party and Frederick Antwi-Nsiah of the Convention People's Party. These obtained 9,742, 2,409 and 379 votes respectively of the total valid votes cast. These were equivalent to 37.59%, 5.43% and 1.28% respectively of the total votes cast.

=== 2012 Parliamentary Elections ===
In 2012, he won the general elections on the ticket of the New Patriotic Party for the same constituency. He was elected with 60,829 votes out of 76,852 total valid votes cast. This was equivalent to 79.15% of total valid votes cast. He was elected over Alidu Baba Dambasea of the National Democratic Congress, Solomon Nkrumah Appia Kubi of the Progressive People's Party, Adam Mohammed of the People's National Convention, Frederick Antwi-Nsiah of the Convention People's Party, Mavis Afriyie of the Democratic People's Party, Abena Nyarko of the National Democratic Party, Osei-Bempah Hayford and Paul Richard Kofi Yeboah both independent candidates. These obtained 10,589, 434, 376, 220, 71, 194, 3,752 and 387 votes respectively of the total valid votes cast. These were equivalent to 13.78%, 0.56%, 0.49%, 0.29%, 0.09%, 0.25%, 4.88% and 0.50% respectively of the total votes cast. Whilst his party was in opposition he served as the minority leader of the Ghanaian parliament from 2013 to 2017.

=== 2020 Parliamentary Elections ===
He again contested the 2020 Ghanaian general election as the parliamentary candidate for the New Patriotic Party. Hon. Osei Kyei Mensah Bonsu contested with four other candidates, which include Dodoovi Francis of the National Democratic Congress, Sulemana Mohammed of the Convention People's Party, Mohammed Mubarak of the All People Congress and the Independent candidate. At the end of the polls, the Incumbent Member of Parliament for Suame, Hon. Osei Kyei Mensah Bonsu, won the seat again for the New Patriotic Party NPP with 67,095 votes representing 76.1%, the National Democratic Congress NDC candidate Dodoovi Francis gathered 9,312 votes representing 10.6% of total valid votes cast. While the Convention People's Party Sulemana Mohammed manage with 299 votes which means he gathered 0.3% of the total valid votes cast. All People Congress also had 213 votes making 0.2% of the total vote cast. Finally the Independent candidate George Prempeh also came second with 11,217 votes making 12.7%of the total vote cast.

== Commonwealth Parliamentary Association (CPA) Elections ==
Osei Kyei-Mensah-Bonsu was elected by the Executive Committee of the Commonwealth Parliamentary Association (CPA) as its new acting Vice-Chairperson. Osei Kyei-Mensah-Bonsu assumed the position after winning an election in which he competed against Garry Brownlee from New Zealand

== Suggested naming rights ==
Prior to the completion of the Parliament's Job 600 building, Mensah Bonsu proposed the renaming of the main Job 600 building. He suggested the building be named after the first speaker of Ghana's fourth parliament, Justice D. F. Annan, to honor the contribution he made towards the development of parliamentary affairs and democracy in Ghana. He also proposed that one of the two new blocks built behind the main Job 600 be named after Peter Ala Adjetey, who succeeded Justice Annan. Opposition to these naming issues was led by members of the Convention People's Party, who believed renaming Job 600 would erase the contributions of Kwame Nkrumah from Ghanaian history.

== Personal life. ==
Osei is married to Mrs. Irene Kyei-Mensah Bonsu and has eight children. He is a Christian and fellowships with the Assemblies of God Church.
