= Job 600 =

Government building in Accra, Ghana

Coordinates: 5°33′29″N 0°11′24″W

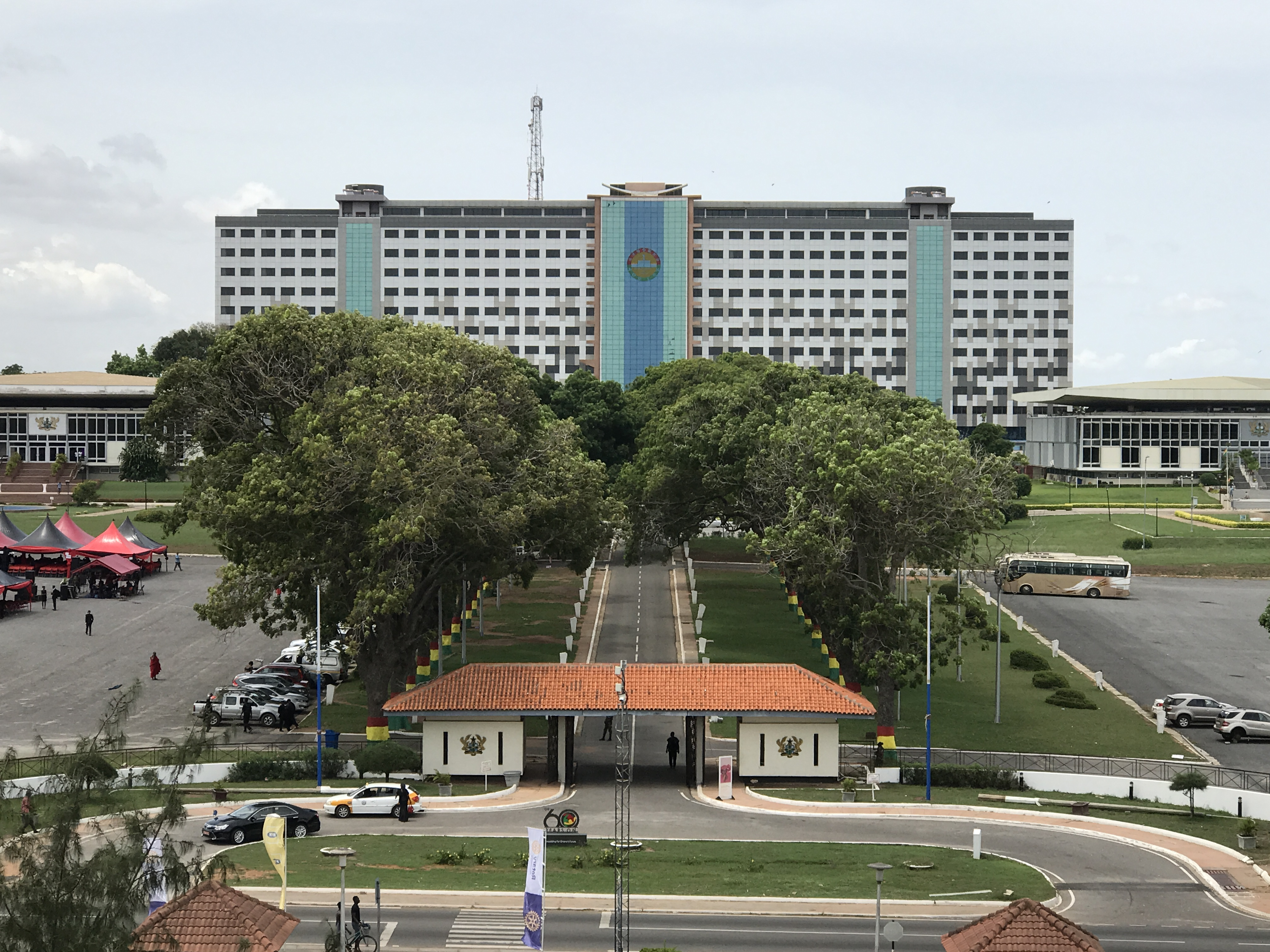
Entrance to Ghana's Parliament House with Job 600 in the background

Job 600 is a Government building in Accra, Ghana. The post-independence structure, which is just behind the Parliament House, was commissioned by Dr. Kwame Nkrumah, the first President of Ghana, in 1965. The building underwent massive renovation to serve as an office complex for Members of Ghana's Parliament and was completed in 2016.

== History ==
Job 600 was constructed to serve as the venue for the 1965 meeting of the Organization of African Unity. It is estimated to have cost more than £4 million. Dr. Nkrumah believed that the building would showcase Ghana as a country with the potential and ability to host international events, and a demonstration of Africa's growing technical capabilities.

== Renovation ==
In 2007 the John Kufuor administration secured a loan facility of a 25 million US dollars from the Social Security and National Insurance Trust for the renovation of the structure. The government stated that upon completion the new Job 600 would serve as an office complex to house the Members of the Ghanaian parliament.

== Financial cost ==
The cost of the project was initially estimated at 62.8 million dollars. In 2011, the estimate for renovating the building was adjusted upwards by 39 million dollars. The increased cost was due to inflation.

== End structure ==
In addition to the original 1965 structure, the new Job 600 will have two new blocks built behind it. One of the new blocks will serve as an auditorium while the other will house a gym, restaurants, a fire station and banks. The complex will consist of 252 offices for members of parliament and offices for research assistants and secretaries. The entire structure will be completed in August 2012.

== Suggested naming rights ==
Prior to the completion of the job 600 project, Osei Kyei Mensah Bonsu, the minority leader in parliament, proposed the renaming of the main Job 600 building. He suggested the building be named after the first speaker of Ghana's fourth parliament, Justice D. F. Annan, to honour the contribution he made towards the development of parliamentary affairs and democracy in Ghana. He also proposed that one of the two new blocks that were built behind the main Job 600 be named after Peter Ala Adjetey, who succeeded Justice Annan. Opposition to these naming issues was led by members of the Convention People's Party, who believed renaming Job 600 would erase the contributions of Dr. Kwame Nkrumah from Ghanaian history.

== Pre-completion disaster ==
On Friday, 11 May 2012, months prior to completion, fire broke out on the fifth floor of the building. Witnesses reported that the fire started in the early hours of the morning. It took several minutes before firemen from the Ghana National Fire Service were able to bring it under control.

== Inauguration ==
The building was officially inaugurated by John Dramani Mahama on 6 November 2015

=== Job 600 Annex ===
On Tuesday 3 November 2020 President Nana Akufo-Addo commissioned a 6-storey annex for the purpose of housing the extra activities of parliament. It is one of the Physical Infrastructure Enhancement Projects of Parliament. There is a 150-seat hall with a media room and archives in the basement. There are 54 offices, 11 offices for supporting staff, 26 offices for Parliamentary Support Staff and 36 offices for research assistants.

== Amenities ==
The building upon its completion had the following amenities:

- 300-seater auditorium
- Gymnasium
- Commercial bank
- Clinic
- Church
- Mosque
- Restaurant,
- MPs’ dining room
- ICT centre
