= Amerley Awua-Asamoa =

Ghanaian politician and diplomat

Ambassador of Ghana to the Kingdom of Denmark
- In office July 2017 – 6 January 2021
- President: Nana Akuffo-Addo
- Succeeded by: Sylvia Naa Adaawa Annoh

Personal details
- Born: Amerley Ollennu; 1956 (age 69–70) Ghana
- Party: New Patriotic Party
- Spouse: Michael Awua Asamoah
- Relations: Nii Amaa Ollennu (father); Kofi Abrefa Busia (uncle); Ashitey Trebi-Ollennu (cousin)
- Children: 3
- Education: Kwame Nkrumah University of Science and Technology (BA); Institute of Social Studies (MA); Ghana Institute of Management and Public Administration (EMBA)

Amerley Awua-Asamoa (née Ollennu; born 1956) is a Ghanaian diplomat, corporate and non-profit executive. A member of the New Patriotic Party of Ghana, she served as Ghana's Ambassador to the Kingdom of Denmark from 2017 to 2021. As ambassador, she had concurrent diplomatic accreditation to Finland, Iceland and Sweden.

== Early life and education ==
Amerley Ollennu was born in 1956. She is the daughter of Nii Amaa Ollennu, a jurist, judge and interim president and Speaker of the Parliament of Ghana during the Second Republic. Her mother was Nana Afua Frema Busia, the Queenmother of Wenchi Traditional Area. Her uncle was Kofi Abrefa Busia, an academic and politician who was the Prime Minister of Ghana from 1969 to 1972. Her primary education was at the Mmofraturo Girls' Boarding School, Kumasi. She then attended Kumasi Academy and Apam Secondary School. She received her bachelor's degree in Law and Sociology from the Kwame Nkrumah University of Science and Technology. She earned an MA in Development Studies with a concentration in Women and Development from Institute of Social Studies in The Hague, Netherlands. She also holds an EMBA from the Ghana Institute of Management and Public Administration and a Diploma in the Principles of Management from The College of Professional Management in Jersey, UK. She holds professional memberships from the Network for Women's Rights (NETRIGHT) Ghana, the Ghana Institute of Management and the Institute of Human Resource Management Practitioners (IHRMP).

== Career ==
In her early career, she worked in human resource management at the Electricity Company of Ghana (ECG) where she became the first woman to be appointed general manager in the history of the firm. She was the National President of Power Queens (Ladies Association of ECG) on consecutive occasions. She was the Head of the Women's Desk at the World Federation of UN Associations (WFUNA) Africa Office in Ghana. She is the Co-founder Executive Director of the local NGO, Association of African Women in Development (AAWID). She was the Vice President of Society for Women and AIDS in Africa (SWAA) Ghana. She has also worked as a primary care field educator in underserved communities in Ghana and in events management.

=== Ambassadorial appointment ===
In July 2017, President Nana Akuffo-Addo named Awua-Asamoa as Ghana's ambassador to Denmark. She was among a cohort of twenty two other Ghanaians named to head various diplomatic Ghanaian missions around the world. Her ambassadorial term ended in January 2021.

== Personal life ==
A Christian, she married Michael Awua Asamoah. They have three children.
