= Akatsi South (Ghana parliament constituency) =

Constituency in Ghana

- constituency for the Parliament of Ghana
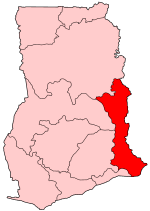
- District: Akatsi District
- Region: Volta Region of Ghana

Current constituency
- Party: National Democratic Congress
- MP: Bernard Ahiafor

Akatsi South (formerly part of Avenor-Ave) is one of the constituencies represented in the Parliament of Ghana. It elects one Member of Parliament (MP) by the first past the post system of election. Akatsi South is located in the Akatsi district of the Volta Region of Ghana.

== Boundaries ==
The seat is located entirely within the Akatsi Municipality of the Volta Region of Ghana. The constituency shares a boundary with Akatsi North District at the North, at North-East with Ketu-North Municipality, at the East with Keta Municipal Assembly, to the South with the Anlo District and to the West with South Tongu Municipal Assembly, at the North-West id the Agotime-Ziope District.

== Members of Parliament ==
First elected	Member	Party
Avenor constituency
1956	Nelson Kwami Maglo	Convention People's Party
1969	Frederick Percival Segbefia	National Alliance of Liberals
1979	Joseph B. Yegbe	United National Convention
Avenor-Ave constituency
1992	Edward Adjaho	National Democratic Congress
Akatsi South constituency
2012	Edward Adjaho	National Democratic Congress
2012 (By-election)	Bernard Ahiafor	National Democratic Congress

== Elections ==
2024 Ghanaian general election: Akatsi South
Party	Candidate	Votes	%	±%
NDC	Bernard Ahiafor	30,268	88.69	+4.98
NPP	Egos Mawuli Ocloo	3,399	9.96	−4.73
Liberal Party of Ghana	Dzameshie Donald Brown	461	1.35	—
Majority		26,869	78.73	+9.71
Turnout		34,521		
Registered electors				

2020 Ghanaian general election:Akatsi South
Party	Candidate	Votes	%	±%
NDC	Bernard Ahiafor	31,624	83.71	
NPP	Leo-Nelson Azidogah	5,550	14.69	
CPP	Maxwell Kwame Nana Atsa	360	0.95	
NDP	Sanusi Murana	245	0.65	
All People's Congress	Donald Brown Dzameshie	0	0.00	
Majority		26,070	69.02	
Turnout				
Registered electors		49,287		

2016 Ghanaian general election: Akatsi South
Party	Candidate	Votes	%	±%
National Democratic Congress	Bernard Ahiafor	16,916	56.34	
Independent	Evans Gadeto Djikunu	11,976	39.89	—
New Patriotic Party	Leo Nelson Adzidogah	850	2.83	
Progressive People's Party	Ametame Japhet	233	0.78	—
Convention People's Party	Andreas Kwabla Avorgbedor	50	0.17	
Majority		4,940	16.45	
Turnout		30,025		—

There was a by-election in February 2012 as Edward Adjaho had been elected Speaker of the Parliament of Ghana at the beginning of the fourth parliament of the Fourth Republic.

2012 By-election: Akatsi South
Party	Candidate	Votes	%	±%
National Democratic Congress	Bernard Ahiafor	12,079		
Independent	Evans Gadeto	8,312		
Progressive People's Party	Anthony Tsikata	369		
Majority		3,767	18.2	
Turnout				—

2012 Ghanaian general election: Akatsi South
Party	Candidate	Votes	%	±%
National Democratic Congress	Edward Korbly Doe Adjaho	21,588	65.08	−3.02
Independent	Evans Gadeto Djikunu	9,945	29.98	N/A
New Patriotic Party	Leo-Nelson Adzidogah	1,388	4.18	−1.52
Progressive People's Party	Ametame Japhet	251	0.76	N/A
Majority		11,643	35.1	
Turnout		33,172		—

The Electoral Commission of Ghana made changes to the constituencies following the national census in 2010. The total number of constituencies increased by 45 from 230 to 275. The Avenor-Ane became the Akatsi South constituency with Akatsi North carved out of it.

2008 Ghanaian general election: Avenor-Ave
Party	Candidate	Votes	%	±%
National Democratic Congress	Edward Korbly Doe Adjaho	23,419	68.1	−13.8
Independent	Seth Dominic Aglago	6,552	19.1	—
New Patriotic Party	Abledu Anthony Kofi	1,955	5.7	−7.5
Democratic Freedom Party	Klutse D. Tony	1,776	5.2	—
Convention People's Party	Vincent Norgbedzi Kudzo	619	1.8	−2.3
Democratic People's Party	Agbovi Wisdom	70	0.2	—
Majority		16,867	49.0	−19.7
Turnout				—

2004 Ghanaian general election: Avenor-Ave
Party	Candidate	Votes	%	±%
National Democratic Congress	Edward Korbly Doe Adjaho	31,795	81.9	3.6
New Patriotic Party	Nicholas Coffie Negble	5,118	13.2	12.0
Convention People's Party	Vincent Norgbedzi	1,585	4.1	2.1
People's National Convention	Ms Mumuni Ayisha	174	0.4	—
Every Ghanaian Living Everywhere	Ms Vida Abla Kotoku	152	0.4	—
Majority		7,814	68.7	8.9
Turnout		39,437	88.8	—

2000 Ghanaian parliamentary election: Avenor
Party	Candidate	Votes	%	±%
National Democratic Congress	Edward Korbly Doe Adjaho	23,981	78.3	−3.7
United Ghana Movement	Abledu A. Kofi	5,665	18.5	—
Convention People's Party	Vincent Norgbedzi	616	2.0	—
New Patriotic Party	Nicholas Coffie Megble	364	1.2	+0.1
Majority		18,316	59.8	−6.5

1996 Ghanaian parliamentary election: Avenor-Ave
Party	Candidate	Votes	%	±%
National Democratic Congress	Edward Korbly Doe Adjaho	32,916	82.0	—
Independent	Paul Kofi Agbalekpor	6,313	15.7	—
People's National Convention	Emmanuel Bedzo Kwasi	465	1.2	—
New Patriotic Party	Kwami Agbenyegah Awadzie	450	1.1	—
Majority		26,603	66.3	—
Turnout		40,144	83.8	+25.7

1992 Ghanaian parliamentary election: Avenor-Ave
Party	Candidate	Votes	%	±%
National Democratic Congress	Edward Korbly Doe Adjaho			—
Majority				—
Turnout		25,156	58.1	—

== See also ==
- List of Ghana Parliament constituencies
