= Bernard Ahiafor =

Ghanaian politician (born 1973)

Hon. Bernard Ahiafor
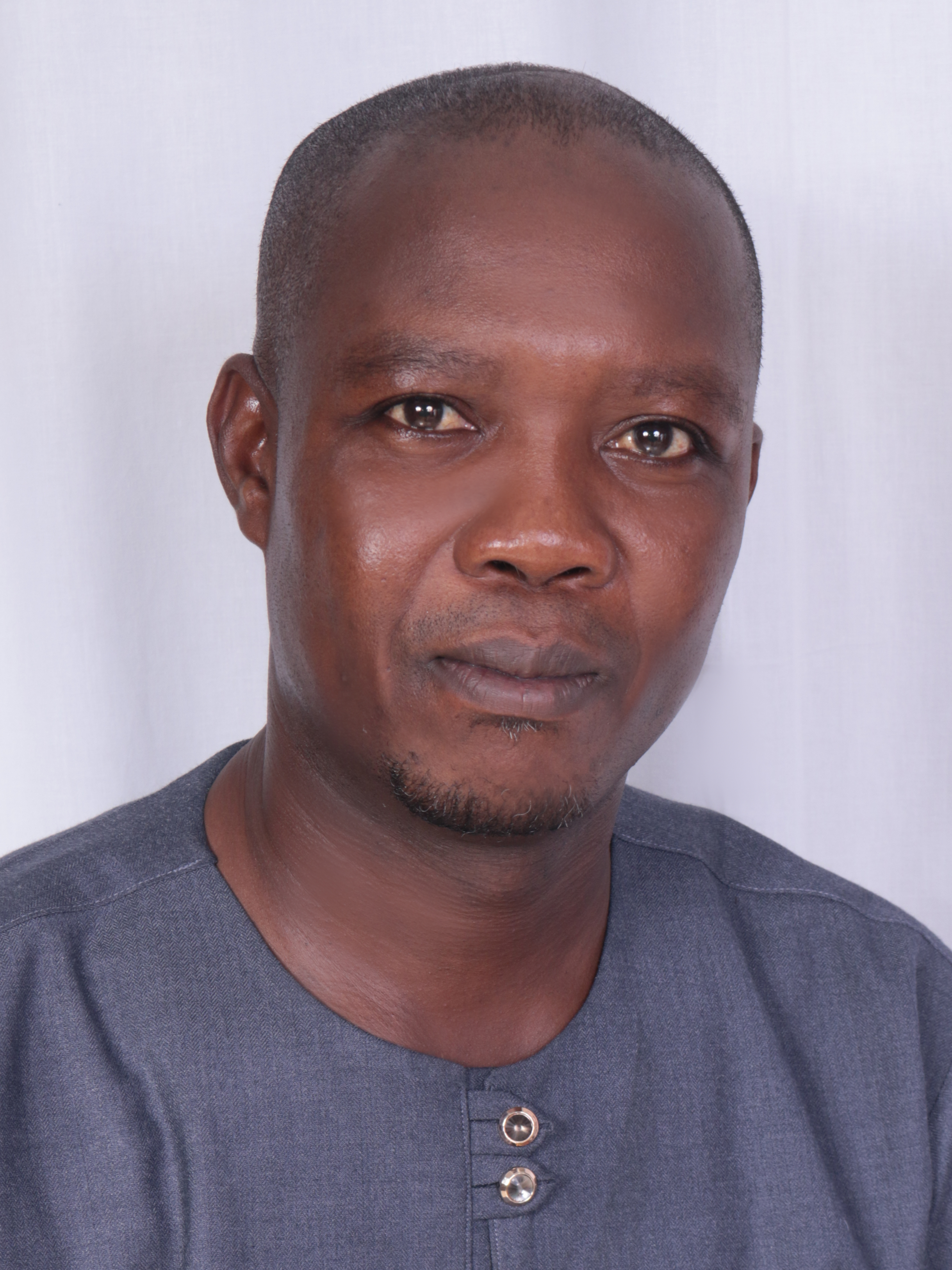

Member of the Ghana Parliament for Akatsi South
- Incumbent
- Assumed office February 2013
- Preceded by: Edward Doe Adjaho
- Majority: 26,070

Personal details
- Born: 6 February 1973 (age 53)
- Party: National Democratic Congress
- Education: Abor Senior High School; Keta Senior High Technical School; University of Ghana
- Occupation: Member of Parliament
- Profession: Lawyer

Bernard Ahiafor (born 6 February 1973) is a Ghanaian politician and a Member of Parliament representing the Akatsi South constituency in the Volta Region on the ticket of the National Democratic Congress (NDC).

== Personal life and education ==
Bernard Ahiafor hails from Atidzive. He obtained O-Levels at Abor Senior High School, and his bachelor's degree from the University of Ghana. He is a Christian. He obtained PROF. LAW COURSE from GHANA SCH. OF LAW, Diploma in Applied Insurance from Ghana Insurance College, ADVANCE LEVEL from KETA SEC. SCHOOL, MIDDLE SCH from AKATSI R.C. MIDDLE SCH, ATIDZIVE L/A MID. SCH, ATIDZIVE R.C. PRIM. SCH.

== Politics ==
Ahiafor is a member of the National Democratic Congress, representing Akatsi South in the Volta Region in the Sixth, Seventh and Eighth Parliament of the Fourth Republic of Ghana.

=== 2012 election ===
Ahiafor first contested the Akatsi South constituency parliamentary seat on the ticket of the National Democratic Congress during this constituency 2012 by-election, when the member parliament for the constituency Hon. Edward Doe Adjaho became the Speaker of Parliament for Sixth Parliament of the Fourth Republic of Ghana. He was elected with 12, 079 votes of the total votes.

==== 2016 election ====
Hon. Bernard Ahiafor was re- elected as a Member of Parliament for Akatsi South constituency on the ticket of National Democratic Congress during the 2016 Ghanaian general election and won with 16,916 votes representing 56.34% of the total votes. He was elected over Evans Gadeto Djikunu (IND), Leo-Nelson Adzidoga of the New Patriotic Party, Ametame Japhet of the Progressive People's Party and Andreas Kwabla Avorgbedor of the Convention People's Party. They obtained 11,976 votes, 850 votes, 233 votes and 50 votes respectively, equivalent to 39.89%, 2.83%, 0.78% and 0.17% of the total votes respectively.

===== 2020 election =====
Hon. Bernard Ahiafor again contested the Akatsi South (Ghana parliament constituency) parliamentary seat on the ticket of National Democratic Congress during the 2020 Ghanaian general election and won with 31,624 votes representing 83.71% of the total votes. He won the parliamentary seat over Leo-Nelson Adzigdogah of the New Patriotic Party who pulled 5,550 votes, which is equivalent to 14.69%, parliamentary candidate for the Convention People's Party Atsa Maxwell Kwame Nana had 360 votes representing 0.95% and the parliamentary candidate for the NDP Sanusi Murana had 245 votes representing 0.65% of the total votes.

===== 2024 election =====
Ahiafor again contested for Akatsi South (Ghana parliament constituency) parliamentary seat on the ticket of the National Democratic Congress (Ghana) during the 2024 Ghanaian general election. He won with 30,268 representing 88.69% of the total votes while the New Patriotic Party's candidate Egos Mawuli Ocloo polled 3,399 representing 9.96% of total votes cast. Dzameshi Donald Brown of the Progressive Alliance for Ghana polled 461, representing 1.65% of votes cast.

===== 1st Deputy Speaker =====
Ahiafor was nominated by the majority caucus of Ghana's ninth parliament as the 1st deputy speaker of parliament.

Akatsi Youth Agitations

Growing dissatisfaction among the youth of the Akatsi constituency has brought the leadership and parliamentary performance of Hon. Bernard Ahiafor under increasing scrutiny. Critics of his tenure have expressed profound disappointment over what they perceive as an abysmal record of parliamentary representation, particularly regarding the apparent lack of significant developmental projects and socioeconomic interventions within the constituency.

As an elected Member of Parliament, Hon. Ahiafor is expected not only to fulfil his legislative and oversight responsibilities but also to leverage his political influence, institutional networks, and strategic position to advocate for infrastructural development, employment opportunities, and improved public services for his constituents. However, sections of the youth contend that these expectations have remained largely unfulfilled, raising legitimate questions about political accountability, effective representation, and the equitable distribution of developmental opportunities.

Furthermore, allegations concerning the potential misuse of political influence for personal enrichment have intensified public dissatisfaction. Of particular concern are unverified claims that financial inducements may be employed to influence National Democratic Congress (NDC) constituency executives ahead of the next parliamentary primaries. Although these allegations require credible evidence and independent verification, their circulation has contributed to growing concerns about internal party democracy, political integrity, and the transparency of candidate selection processes.

The emerging agitation among the youth therefore reflects broader concerns about the relationship between political leadership, public accountability, and constituency development. It underscores the importance of ensuring that parliamentary representation translates into measurable socioeconomic progress rather than merely the consolidation of individual political influence.

Ultimately, the people of Akatsi deserve leadership characterised by transparency, accountability, political integrity, and a demonstrable commitment to sustainable development. Addressing these concerns will require constructive engagement with constituents, a transparent assessment of developmental achievements, and renewed efforts to restore public confidence in political representation.

Parliament of Ghana
Preceded by Edward Adjaho	Member of Parliament for 2013–present	Incumbent
