= John Darko =

Ghanaian politician and lawyer

Hon. John Darko MP

Member of the Ghana Parliament for Suame
- Incumbent
- Assumed office 7 January 2025
- Preceded by: Osei Kyei-Mensah-Bonsu
- President: John Dramani Mahama
- Vice President: Jane Naana Opoku-Agyemang

Personal details
- Born: 4 June 1979 (age 47) Bremang, Ashanti Region, Ghana
- Party: New Patriotic Party
- Education: University of Ghana (BA, LLB); Ghana School of Law (BL); University of Houston (LLM)
- Occupation: Politician
- Profession: Lawyer

John Darko (born June 4, 1979) is a Ghanaian lawyer and politician, serving as the Member of Parliament for the Suame constituency in the Ashanti Region. He represents the New Patriotic Party (NPP) in the Ninth Parliament of the Fourth Republic of Ghana

== Early life and education ==
John Darko hails from Bremang, a suburb of Kumasi in the Ashanti Region of Ghana. He holds BA (HON) political science & Theatre Arts in 2003 from the University of Ghana. He also holds a LLB from the University of Ghana in 2007. He further went to the Ghana School of Law and completed in 2009. He also has an LLM from the University of Houston in 2010.

== Career ==
Darko began his legal career as an Associate at Gyandoh Asmah & Co., and later became a partner at Darko, Keli‑Delataa & Co. He joined the faculty at the Ghana Institute of Management and Public Administration (GIMPA) in 2014, teaching courses such as constitutional, environmental, and natural resource law.

=== Politics ===
John Darko was appointed Legal Counsel to the NPP Minority Caucus in Parliament in March 2025. He contested and won the New Patriotic Party (NPP) primaries for the Suame constituency in July 2024, securing 68% of the votes.

In the December 2024 general elections, he was elected as Member of Parliament for Suame with approximately 74.6% of the valid votes cast, succeeding the long-serving MP and former Majority Leader, Osei Kyei-Mensah-Bonsu. In Parliament, he serves on the Youth, Sports and Culture Committee, and the Judiciary Committee

== Personal life ==
Darko is a Christian.
