= Edward Adjaho =

Ghanaian politician and barrister

The Right Honourable Edward Doe Adjaho MP
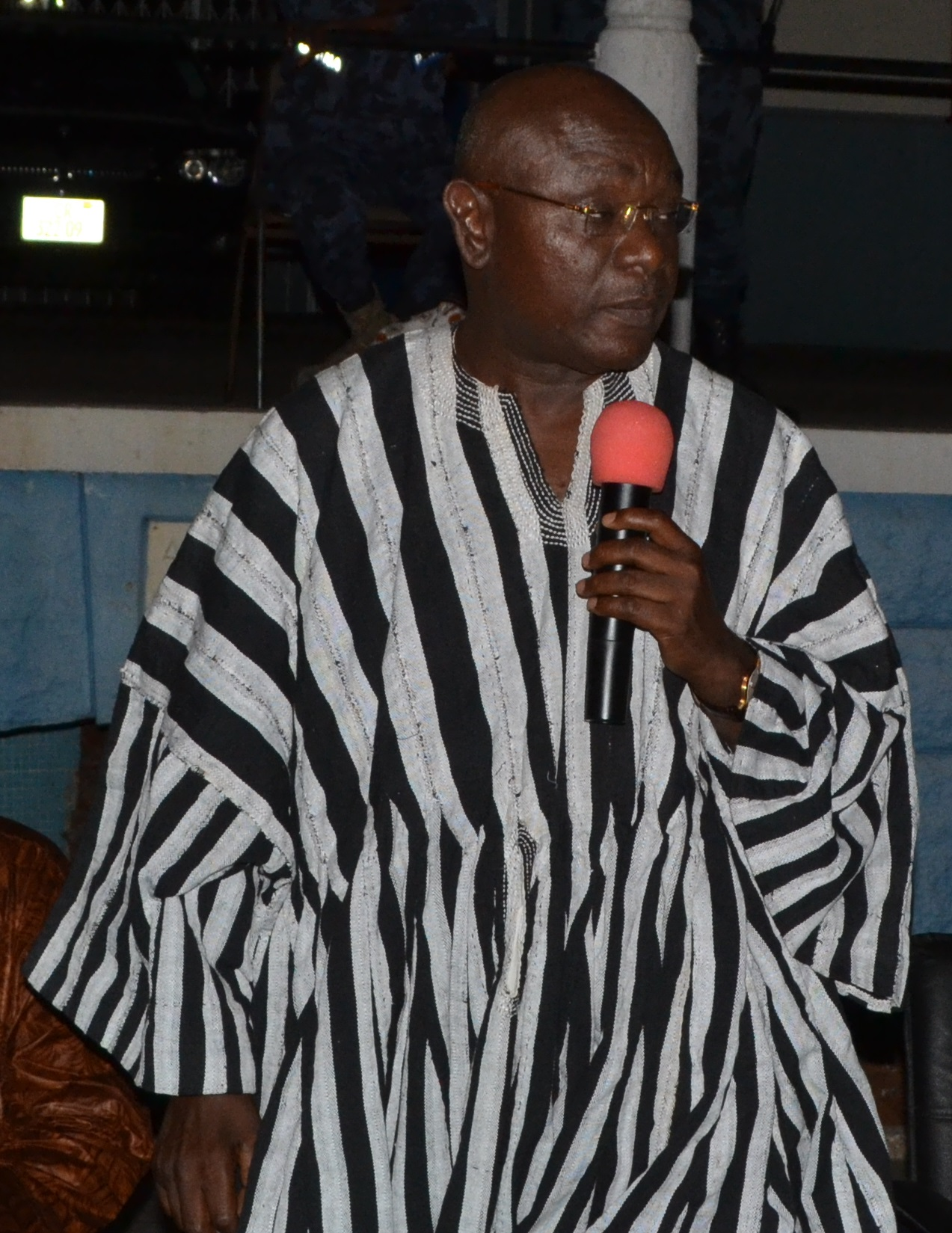

Speaker of the Parliament of Ghana (5th Speaker of Fourth Republic)
- In office 7 January 2013 – 6 January 2017
- President: John Dramani Mahama
- Vice President: Kwesi Amissah-Arthur
- Preceded by: Joyce Adeline Bamford-Addo
- Succeeded by: Mike Oquaye

Member of Parliament for Avenor-Ave
- In office January 1993 – January 2013
- Preceded by: Parliament formed
- Succeeded by: Bernard Ahiafor

First Deputy Speaker
- In office January 2009 – January 2013
- Preceded by: Fred W. A. Blay
- Succeeded by: Ebo Barton-Odro

Deputy Minority Leader
- In office 2005–2009
- Preceded by: I. K. Adjei-Mensah
- Succeeded by: Ambrose Dery

Minority Chief Whip
- In office 2001–2005
- Preceded by: S. K. Boafo
- Succeeded by: John Tia

Majority Chief Whip
- In office 1998–2001
- Preceded by: None
- Succeeded by: Yaw Barimah

Personal details
- Born: Edward Korbly Doe Adjaho; 3 January 1957 (age 69) Ghana
- Party: National Democratic Congress
- Children: 3
- Education: Accra Academy
- Alma mater: University of Ghana
- Occupation: Politician
- Profession: Lawyer

Edward Korbly Doe Adjaho, MP (born 3 January 1957) is a Ghanaian politician and lawyer who was Speaker of the Parliament of Ghana from 2013 to 2017. He is the fifth Speaker elected in the Fourth Republic of Ghana and the first Speaker to have been elected from amongst members of Ghana's parliament in the Fourth Republic. Following his elevation to the position of Speaker, he resigned his position as Member of Parliament for the Avenor-Ave constituency in the Parliament of Ghana.

He was one of the few politicians who retained their seats in parliament throughout the Fourth Republic of Ghana serving for 20 years from 1993 to 2013. He was also a member of the Pan-African Parliament.

== Early life and education ==
Edward Korbly Doe Adjaho was born on 3 January 1957. He studied at the Accra Academy for his secondary school education and continued his education at the University of Ghana, where he obtained the Bachelor of Law degree, LL.B. in 1984. He enrolled at the Ghana School of Law, where he trained to become a barrister-at-law and was called to the bar in 1986. He worked at the Attorney-General's department before turning to politics.

== Career ==
Adjaho is a lawyer by profession. He worked at the Attorney-General's Department. He was also a Member of Parliament from January 1993 to January 2013.

== Politics ==
=== Member of Parliament ===
Adjaho stood on the ticket of the National Democratic Congress in the 1992 parliamentary election and retained his seat in all four subsequent elections. He was a member of parliament of the 1st, 2nd, 3rd, 4th and 5th parliament of the Republic of Ghana. He was the First Deputy Speaker of Parliament from 2009 to 2013.

=== Speaker of Parliament ===
He was elected to the position of Speaker of Parliament in the morning of 7 January 2013, succeeding Joyce Adeline Bamford-Addo.He is the first speaker to have been elected from among members of Ghana's parliament. He thus became the fifth Speaker of the Fourth Republic of Ghana. By virtue of Article 97 of the 1992 Constitution, Adjaho vacated his seat upon assumption of the office of Speaker of Parliament. He was sworn in by Chief Justice Georgina Theodora Woode at the first sitting of the new Parliament. He was the Speaker of Parliament until his tenure ended on 6 January 2017 after the 6th Parliament was dissolved.

== Elections ==
Adjaho was elected into the first parliament of the fourth republic of Ghana on 7 January 1993 after he was pronounced winner at the 1992 Ghanaian parliamentary election held on 29 December 1992.

He was elected as the member of parliament for the Avenor constituency in the 2000 Ghanaian general elections. He won the elections. His constituency was a part of the 17 parliamentary seats out of 19 seats won by the National Democratic Congress in that election for the Volta Region.

The National Democratic Congress won a minority total of 92 parliamentary seats out of 200 seats in the 3rd parliament of the 4th republic of Ghana. He was elected with 23,981 votes out of 31,431 total valid votes cast. This was equivalent to 78.3% of the total valid votes cast.

He was elected over Abledu A. Kofi of the United Ghana Movement, Vincent K. Norgbedzi of the Convention People's Party and Nicholas C. Megbele of the New Patriotic Party. These obtained 5,665, 616 and 364 votes respectively out of the total valid votes cast. These were equivalent to 18.5%, 2% and 1.2% respectively of total valid votes cast.

== Personal life ==
Adjaho is a Christian. He is married and has five children.

== See also ==
- National Democratic Congress
- Avenor-Ave constituency

== Sources ==
- GhanaDistricts.com

Parliament of Ghana
New title	Member of Parliament for Avenor-Ave; 1993 – 7 January 2013	Succeeded by Bernard Ahiafor
Preceded by Freddie Blay	First Deputy Speaker, Parliament of Ghana; 2009 - 2013	Succeeded by Ebo Barton Oduro
Preceded by Joyce Adeline Bamford-Addo	Speaker of Ghanaian Parliament; 2013 - 2017	Succeeded by Mike Oquaye
