= Suame (Ghana parliament constituency) =

Constituency in the Ashanti Region of Ghana

- constituency for the Parliament of Ghana
- District: Kumasi Metropolitan District
- Region: Ashanti Region of Ghana

Current constituency
- Created: 2004
- Party: New Patriotic Party
- MP: John Darko

Suame (//) is one of the constituencies represented in the Parliament of Ghana. It elects one Member of Parliament (MP) by the first past the post system of election. John Darko is the member of parliament for the constituency. Suame was formerly located in the Kumasi Metropolitan district but now it is a municipal assembly of the Ashanti Region of Ghana.

This seat was created prior to the Ghanaian parliamentary election in 2004 when the Old Tafo-Suame constituency was split into the Old Tafo and Suame constituencies respectively.

== Boundaries ==
The seat is located within the Kumasi Metropolitan Assembly and shares boundaries with Old Tafo (to the north), Afigya Kwabre South (to the east) and Kumasi Metropolis (to the west and south).

== History ==
The constituency was first created in 2004 by the Electoral Commission of Ghana along with 29 other new ones, increasing the number of constituencies from 200 to 230.

== Members of Parliament ==
| Election | Member | Party |
|---|---|---|
| 2004 | Constituency created | |
| 2004 | Osei Kyei Mensah Bonsu | New Patriotic Party |

== Elections ==
2004 Ghanaian parliamentary election:Suame Source:Ghana Home Page
| Party | Candidate | Votes | % | ±% |
|---|---|---|---|---|
| New Patriotic Party | Osei Kyei Mensah Bonsu | 48,500 | 82.1 | N/A |
| National Democratic Congress | Paul Richard Yeboah | 8,448 | 14.3 | N/A |
| Convention People's Party | Frederick Antwi | 1,157 | 2.0 | N/A |
| People's National Convention | Young Sampson Agonno | 934 | 1.6 | N/A |
| Majority | | 40,052 | 67.8 | N/A |

== See also ==
- List of Ghana Parliament constituencies
