= Andrew Asiamah Amoako =

Ghanaian politician

Hon. Andrew Asiamah Amoako
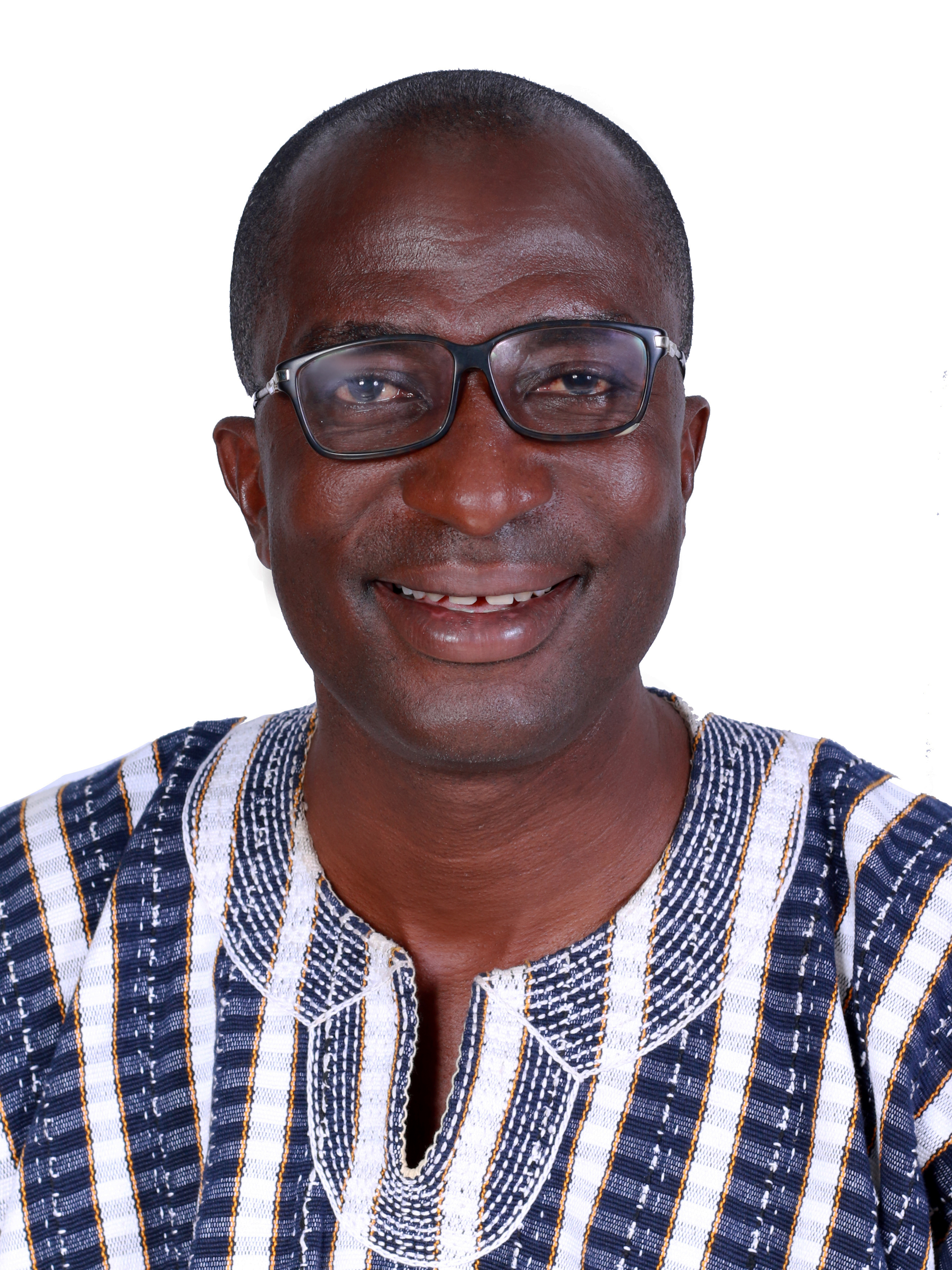

Second Deputy Speaker of Parliament, Member of Parliament for Fomena Constituency
- Incumbent
- Assumed office 7 January 2021
- Preceded by: Alban Bagbin
- Majority: 3,394

Personal details
- Born: Andrew Asiamah Amoako; 24 February 1966 (age 60) Wioso Adansi, Ghana
- Party: Independent (2021-present); New Patriotic Party (until 2021)
- Spouse: Grace Owusu Ansah
- Education: Kwame Nkrumah University of Science and Technology; Ghana School of Law
- Occupation: Politician
- Profession: Land Officer, Valuer, Lawyer
- Committees: Members Holding Offices of Profit Committee (Chairperson); Standing Orders Committee; Subsidiary Legislation Committee; Education Committee; Mines and Energy Committee

Andrew Asiamah Amoako (24 February 1966) is a Ghanaian lawyer, politician and member of the Eighth Parliament of the Fourth Republic of Ghana, elected to office in December 2020 as an independent candidate. He currently represents the Fomena Constituency in the Ashanti Region. He is also the Second Deputy Speaker of the 8th Parliament of the Republic of Ghana.

== Early life and education ==
Amoako was born on 24 February 1966 at Wioso-Adansi in the Ashanti Region. He holds an MSc in Environmental Resources Management, Master of Arts in Conflict Resolution and an LLB (Law) from the Kwame Nkrumah University of Science and Technology and a professional law licence (BL) from the Ghana School of Law. He obtained Masters of Art from Kofi Annan Int. Peace Centre, BACHELOR OF SCIENCE from UST, Diploma i Surveying Practice from Ghana Institution of Surveyors.

== Career ==
Before entering politics, he was a legal practitioner at the Minka Premo and Co. (Akosombo Chambers). He was the Estates Officer, Land Officer and Valuer at the Kumasi Metropolitan Assembly.

== Politics ==
After deciding not to contest in the party's primaries prior to the 2020 general elections due to the unfair treatment he received from his own party, he decided to run as an independent candidate. He had been a member of the New Patriotic Party (NPP), which, citing Article 3(9) of its constitution, revoked his membership and notified the Speaker of Parliament, who duly declared his seat vacant on 13 October 2020 under the provisions of Article 97 (1)g of the Constitution. Amoako objected on the grounds that being expelled from the party did not mean he was no longer a member of parliament, and that only the Parliament of Ghana could revoke his position as an elected MP. Legal practitioner Kwaku Asare agreed with Amoako, arguing that such a decision is a legal matter which falls under the jurisdiction of the High Court, as specified by Article 99(1) of the Constitution.

Amoako first won the Fomena parliamentary seat during the December 2016 elections with 14,823 representing 72.7% under the ticket of the New Patriotic Party.

However, in the December 2020 elections, after breaking away from the party to run as independent candidate, he polled 12,805 votes, defeating his main opponent, his former party's Philip Ofori-Asante, who secured 10,798 votes. Amoako became the only independent candidate to win in the 2020 parliamentary elections. His position as an independent member of parliament became even more significant after the elections given that neither of the two main political parties (NPP and National Democratic Congress) could secure an outright majority. In a post-election interview, Amoako indicated that he had no ill-feelings towards the NPP over the termination of his party membership. The General Secretary of the NPP, John Boadu, has suggested that Amoako could reapply for his NPP membership subject to specific party regulations and conditions. On 7 January 2021, Asiamah was elected as the Second Deputy Speaker of Parliament. He is the only independent member of parliament to have been elected to that position in the history of Ghana.

=== Committees ===
Amoako is the chairperson of the Members Holding Offices of Profit Committee, a member of the Standing Orders Committee, a member of the Subsidiary Legislation Committee, a member of the Education Committee and a member of the Mines and Energy Committee.

== Personal life ==
Amoako is a Christian.
