= Joyce Bamford-Addo =

Ghanaian judge and legislator

The Right Honourable Joyce Adeline Bamford-Addo JSC, CV
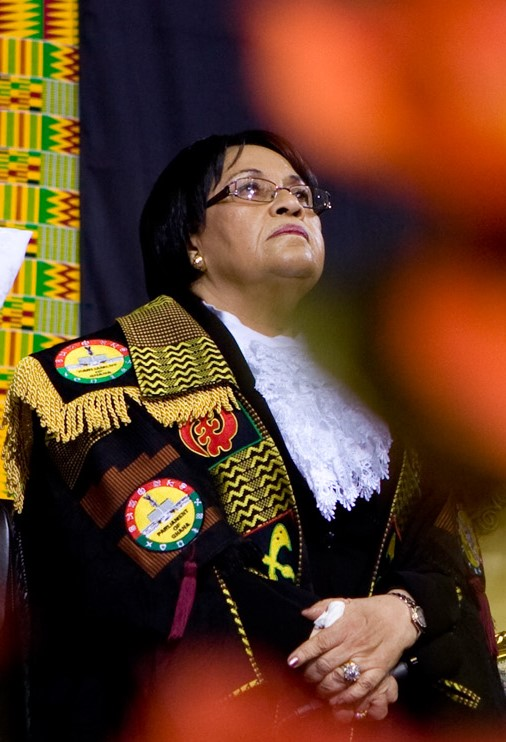
- Bamford-Addo in parliament

Speaker of the Parliament of Ghana 4th Speaker of the Fourth Republic
- In office 7 January 2009 – 6 January 2013
- President: John Evans Atta-Mills (2009-12); John Dramani Mahama (2012)
- Vice President: John Dramani Mahama (2009-12); Kwesi Amissah-Arthur (2012)
- Preceded by: Ebenezer Sekyi-Hughes
- Succeeded by: Edward Adjaho

Justice of the Supreme Court of Ghana
- In office 19 November 1991 – October 2004
- Appointed by: Jerry Rawlings
- President: Jerry Rawlings (1991-2001); John Kufuor (2001-2009)

Personal details
- Born: Joyce Adeline Bamford; 26 March 1937 (age 89) Accra, Gold Coast
- Education: Holy Child School; Inner Temple
- Profession: Judge; Barrister
- Known for: First woman Justice of the Supreme Court of Ghana; First woman Speaker of the Parliament of Ghana

Joyce Adeline Bamford-Addo, JSC, CV (born 26 March 1937) is a Ghanaian barrister and judge who served as the first female Speaker of the Parliament of Ghana from 2009 to 2013. She was the first woman to be elected to that position in the West African sub-region. Bamford-Addo also was the first female Justice of the Supreme Court of Ghana. She served in that role from 1991 until 2004, when she retired.

== Early life and education ==
Born in 1937 in Accra to an English father and a Ghanaian mother from Aburi. Joyce Bamford-Addo attended the Government Girls' School, Accra, St. Mary's Boarding School and Our Lady of Apostles (OLA) Boarding School, along with her sister Cynthia, in Cape Coast for her basic education. She subsequently attended Holy Child School, also in Cape Coast, for her secondary education. She proceeded to the United Kingdom for legal training. She joined the Inner Temple to train under the apprenticeship system known as Inns of Court and was called to the English Bar in 1961.

== Judicial service ==
Bamford-Addo returned to Ghana after working in the United Kingdom for a year. She was called to the Ghana Bar in 1962. She started working as an Assistant State Attorney in 1963 and promoted to State Attorney, then subsequently promoted to become a Senior State Attorney before becoming a Principal State Attorney. She became Chief State Attorney in 1973. She was appointed Director of Public Prosecutions in 1976, a position she held for 10 years.

=== Justice of the Supreme Court of Ghana ===
She was appointed by Jerry Rawlings as a Supreme Court Judge in 1991, becoming the first female Justice of the Supreme Court of Ghana. After working in the public service for several years, she retired voluntarily from the Supreme Court in October 2004. It was allegedly reported that she retired over being bypassed by her junior, Justice George Kingsley Acquah, in the appointment of Chief Justice.

== Politics ==
In 1991, during the late Provisional National Defence Council (PNDC) era, Bamford-Addo became the Second Deputy Speaker of Ghana's Consultative Assembly, set up to draft what became the 1992 constitution.

=== Speaker of Parliament ===
Following the 2008 presidential and parliamentary elections, she was elected unopposed as the Speaker of the Fourth Parliament of the Fourth Republic of Ghana, taking over from Ebenezer Sekyi-Hughes, serving as the first female to take up that position, and second female to head an arm of government after Georgina Theodora Wood was appointed Chief Justice of the Supreme Court of Ghana. The election also made her the highest ranked female in Ghana's political history surpassing Georgina Theodora Woods. She became known across Africa and across the globe joining other female speakers like Betty Boothroyd in the United Kingdom and Nancy Pelosi of the United States of America as first female speakers of their respective countries.

== Professional association ==
Bamford-Addo is a member of the Ghana Bar Association, Catholic Lawyers Guild, International Federation of Women Lawyers (FIDA) and the Commonwealth Lawyers Association. Whilst working in the public service as a Supreme Court Judge, she also served as a member of the Legal Aid Board and the Judicial Council (General Legal Council).

She served as the representative from Ghana at several UN Commission on the Status of women international conferences.

== Awards and recognition ==
Bamford-Addo was awarded the best woman of the year by the American Biographical Institute in 2000 due to her zeal and unfettered efforts towards women issues and women empowerment. She is considered as a female pacesetter in law and legislation in Ghana and an inspiration and role model generally to Ghanaian women.

She was honored by Ghana Association of Women Entrepreneurs (GAWE) at their Global Women Entrepreneur Trade Fair and Investment Forum in Accra dinner and awards night in 2011 along with other Ghana's first women top office holders Justice Georgina Theodora Wood, first woman Chief Justice, Anna Bossman, first woman Acting Commissioner for the Commission on Human Rights and Administrative Justice (CHRAJ) and Elizabeth Mills-Robertson, first woman Acting Inspector General of Police (IGP).

In October 2011, she was honored by President John Evans Atta Mills with the Companion of the Order of the Volta, highest in the Order of Volta awards, in recognition of her outstanding service to Ghana.

== Personal life ==
Bamford-Addo is a devout Christian and worships as a Roman Catholic.

== See also ==
- Speaker of the Parliament of Ghana
- List of judges of the Supreme Court of Ghana
- Supreme Court of Ghana

Political offices
Preceded by Ebenezer Sekyi-Hughes	Speaker of Ghanaian Parliament; 2009–13	Succeeded by Edward Adjaho
