= Augustus Molade Akiwumi =

Lawyer and former Speaker of the Parliament of Ghana

The Right Honourable Augustus Molade Akiwumi JSC

2nd Speaker of the Parliament of Ghana
- In office February 1958 – June 1960
- Preceded by: Sir Emannuel C. Quist
- Succeeded by: Joseph Richard Asiedu

Justice of the Supreme Court of Ghana
- In office July 1960 – April 1961

Personal details
- Born: 7 April 1891 Lagos, Nigeria
- Died: 1985 (aged 93–94) Accra, Ghana
- Party: Convention People's Party
- Spouses: Grace Aryee; Helen Kabuki Ocansey
- Children: 8, Akiwusi; Akiola; Akilano; Akilebu; Akilowu; Omotayo; Helen; Akilaja(Ninii)
- Education: Queen's College, Taunton; Fitzwilliam College, Cambridge; Lincoln's Inn
- Occupation: Barrister; Banker; Judge

Augustus Molade Akiwumi JSC (7 April 1891 – 1985) was a barrister and judge who became the second Speaker of the Parliament of Ghana from 1958 and 1960 and an inaugural Justice of the Supreme Court of Ghana between 1960 and 1961.

== Early life ==
Augustus Akiwumi was born in Lagos, Nigeria to a large Yoruba family of twelve children. He became a naturalised Ghanaian, after he relocated to the Gold Coast as a child with his father, S. O. Akiwumi. S. O. Akiwumi was the vice president of the Red Cross League. In 1910, Augustus Akiwumi was sent to live with guardians, a Smith family of Crosby, Cumbria in England. He attended Queen's College, Taunton, Somerset. Seven of his other siblings also attended boarding school in England. He proceeded to Fitzwilliam College, Cambridge, where he studied law. He also trained as a banker at the Midland Bank, Ludgate Hill, London, prior to his return to Ghana.

== Career ==
He was called to the bar at the Honourable Society of Lincoln's Inn in 1921. In 1964, while he was a High Court Judge in Ghana, he was appointed Legal Secretary in the East African Common Service Organisation. He was elected Speaker of the Parliament in February 1958 in the Dominion of Ghana. He became a judge in Ghana and was later appointed a Supreme Court Judge from July 1960 until his retirement from the bench in April 1961.

== Family ==
Akiwumi married Grace Aryee and, subsequently, Helen Kabuki Ocansey, both Ghanaians.

== See also ==
- List of judges of the Supreme Court of Ghana
- Supreme Court of Ghana

Political offices
Preceded by Sir Emmanuel Charles Quist	Speaker of the Parliament of Ghana; 1958 – 1960	Succeeded by Joseph Richard Asiedu
Notes and references
1. http://www.parliament.gh/leadershipdetails.php?id=0003
