= Ebenezer Sekyi-Hughes =

Former Speaker of the Parliament of Ghana

The Right Honourable Ebenezer Begyina Sekyi Hughes

Speaker of the Parliament of Ghana (3rd Speaker of the Fourth Republic)
- In office 7 January 2005 – 7 January 2009
- Preceded by: Peter Ala Adjetey
- Succeeded by: Joyce Bamford-Addo

Personal details
- Born: 4 September 1939 (age 86) Cape Coast, Ghana
- Children: 6
- Occupation: Solicitor / Barrister

Ebenezer Begyina Sekyi Hughes (born 4 September 1939) was the Speaker of the Parliament of Ghana between 2005 and 2009.

== Early life ==
Ebenezer Sekyi-Hughes was born on 4 September 1939 at Cape Coast, the capital of the Central Region of Ghana. From 1945 to 1953, he had his basic education at Cape Coast Government Boys School (now the Philip Quaque Boys School), founded c. 1766 by Philip Quaque, the first African to be ordained an Anglican vicar. His secondary education was at Adisadel College between 1954 and 1960. In 1961 he gained admission to the University of Ghana, Legon, where he obtained a Bachelor of Arts degree in 1964. He then attended the Ghana School of Law, graduating with an LLB in 1966.

== Career ==
Ebenezer Sekyi-Hughes was admitted to the Ghana Bar as a barrister and solicitor of the Supreme Court of Ghana in 1966. He was in private legal practice in Accra and Takoradi in the Western Region from October 1966. He was appointed notary public by the Chief Justice of Ghana in 1974. He rose to the level of Senior Advocate in 1990. Sekyi-Hughes was the President of the Western Region Branch of the Ghana Bar Association from 1977 to 1981. He was also a member of the Judicial Council of Ghana during the same period. Sekyi-Hughes was elected by the chiefs and people of the Western Region to the Council of State of Ghana in 2001. Although he lost elections as the first National Vice-Chairman in the late 1990s, he remained loyal to the party until he was re-elected to the National Council of Elders and subsequently appointed as the Speaker of Parliament during the NPP Administration.

== Family ==
Sekyi-Hughes is married with six children.

Political offices
| Preceded by Peter Ala Adjetey | Speaker of the Parliament of Ghana; 2005 – 2009 | Succeeded by Joyce Bamford-Addo |
