= Ashitey Trebi-Ollennu =

Ghanaian engineer

Ashitey Trebi-Ollennu CEng, FIET, FRAeS, SMIEE, PMP, FGA
- Born: Accra, Ghana
- Education: Ghana Secondary Technical School; Queen Mary University of London (BEng); Cranfield University (PhD)
- Known for: Mars rover InSight Mars mission
- Scientific career
- Fields: Avionics; Control engineering; Robotics
- Institutions: NASA Jet Propulsion Laboratory at Caltech
- Thesis: Robust Non-linear Control Designs Using Adaptive Fuzzy Systems

Ashitey Trebi-Ollennu, CEng, FIET, FRAeS, SMIEE, PMP, FGA is a Ghanaian robotics engineer at the National Aeronautics and Space Administration (NASA) and the chief engineer and technical group leader for the mobility and manipulation group at the Jet Propulsion Laboratory He has been associated with various NASA Mars missions, notably the Mars Rover and InSight projects.

== Early life and education ==
Ashitey Trebi-Ollennu was born in Accra, Ghana, to Ga parents. Ollennu's father, Trebi Ollennu was an economist at the Ministry of Finance in Accra. As a child, Ashitey lived close to an airport and would always see airplanes fly by. This fascinated him and fostered his interest in space exploration, aircraft and aerial robots, particularly autopilots. He read a lot on the "Glass Cockpit" system for both military and civil airplanes. He attended Garrison Primary School in Burma Camp and completed his secondary education at the Ghana Secondary Technical School. He travelled to the United Kingdom where he received his bachelor's degree in engineering (BEng) in Avionics at the Queen Mary University of London in 1991, with a thesis on "Review of 4-D guidance techniques and the simulation of 4-D aircraft guidance". Between 1993 and 1996, he pursued his PhD in Control Systems Engineering at the School of Engineering and Applied Science, Royal Military College of Science, Cranfield University in the UK where he wrote his dissertation titled "Robust Non-linear Control Designs Using Adaptive Fuzzy Systems." He also holds a project management certification from the California Institute of Technology (Caltech), earned in 2007.

== Career ==
He joined the NASA Jet Propulsion Laboratory in 1999 and rose through the ranks to become the leader of the team that designed the Mars Rover robot that landed on the red planet. Over the years, his responsibilities have involved flight projects, flight projects review boards, mission formulation, technology tasks, technical writing and proposals. He also served as a reviewer for NASA Science Mission Directorate technology proposals and NASA Office of Education proposals. Other engagements at NASA are 2003 – Mars Exploration Rover, 2007 – Phoenix Mars Lander and Mars Science Laboratory which is scheduled for launch in 2011 and will be NASA's third generation of rover to explore Mars.

Among his roles at the In Sight Mars Mission were Product Delivery Manager and Chief for the Instrument Deployment System, a technical group lead in the Robotic Manipulation & Sampling group at NASA Jet Propulsion Laboratory, California Institute of Technology, where he has been since 1999. His technical research interests include on planetary rovers and its operations, system of systems, manipulation, multiple mobile robots (planetary outpost), mechatronics, reconfigurable robots, audjustable autonomy and man-machine interaction. Closely linked to these are various areas in robotics systems and engineering: Space Robotics Systems, Flight Systems Integration & Test, Planetary Rover Operations, System of Systems Design, Distributed Mobile Robotics, System Architectures, Dynamic Modeling, Control Systems design for Aerospace and Mechatronics Systems and Contract Technical Management. He has more than 95 publications to his credit.

He was a Research Scholar at the Institute for Complex Engineered Systems at the Carnegie Mellon University in Pittsburgh where he was instrumental in the design and implementation of a system of All Terrain Vehicles (ATVs) for distributed tactical surveillance for the Defense Advanced Research Projects Agency (DARPA).

In an interview with the BBC, Ashitey Trebi-Ollennu noted that he had started a project in his home country of Ghana to make Science Technology Engineering and Mathematics (STEM) more likable and fun. He worked on the Phoenix (spacecraft) that found water on Mars. The InSight mission successfully landed on the red planet on Monday 26 November 2018. As per the New York Times, the spacecraft was expected to study the Mars' underworld, listening for marsquakes and seeking clues about the dusty world's formation.

In 2011 Ashitey founded the Ghana Robotics Academy Foundation (GRAF), a nonprofit volunteer organization dedicated to motivating and inspiring young Ghanaians in science, technology and engineering. His foundation won the Google RISE Award 2013.

Commenting on his job, he noted, "The brilliant thing about my job is that, it is not a circumscribed routine, there are different challenges everyday. Believe me, it is a lot of fun. NASA is also a great organization that cares about its people and their personal development, need I say more?”

== Honours and awards ==
Trebi-Ollennu is a Fellow of the Institution of Engineering and Technology, U. K., and a Fellow of the Royal Aeronautical Society, U.K. as well as a Senior Member of the Institute of Electrical and Electronics Engineers. He is also a Fellow of the Ghana Academy of Arts and Sciences. He has received multiple awards. His individual prizes include:

- Royal Aeronautical Society (RAeS) Silver Award Medal (2020) "for his contribution to the successful development and delivery of the Instrument Deployment System on the InSight Mars Mission. It enabled the first robotic deployment by NASA of a seismometer on another planet"
- NASA Exceptional Engineering Achievement Medal (2008) "For exceptional technical contributions to the Mars Exploration Rovers, providing comprehensive engineering support pre- and post-launch, including resolutions of rover anomalies"
- Sir Monty Finniston Achievement Medal (2007) "For outstanding technical contribution to any field of engineering from the Institution of Engineering and Technology (IET), Europe's largest professional society for engineers;" "For outstanding technical contribution to the NASA's Mars Exploration Rovers mission”
- Outstanding Engineer Award (2007), from IEEE Region 6 (12 states of the Western United States, "For exceptional technical leadership and ingenuity in diagnosing the Mars Exploration Rover Opportunity robotic arm anomaly culminating in a successful resolution of the anomaly leading to the continuing successful exploration of the surface of Mars in the extended mission;" "For exceptional service to the IEEE as a Guest Editor in organizing and publishing a special issue of IEEE Robotics & Automation Magazine on Mars Exploration Rovers, June 2006"
- JPL Mariner Award (2006) from MER "For outstanding leadership in the analysis and resolution of the IDD unstow anomaly on Opportunity Rover"

Ollennu's team awards include:

- NASA Group Achievement Award-Mars Exploration Rover Avionics Team, 25 May 25, 2004
- NASA Group Achievement Award-Mars Exploration Rover Flight System, Management and Engineering Team, 25 May 2004
- NASA Group Achievement Award-Mars Exploration Rover Project Operations Team, 25 May 2004

== Personal life ==
Trebi-Ollennu's uncle was the barrister and judge, Nii Amaa Ollennu (1906–1986), elected the Speaker of the Parliament of Ghana during the Second Republic as well as serving as the Chairman of the Presidential Commission and acting President of Ghana from 7 August 1970 to 31 August 1970. His personal interests include various sports: lawn tennis, table tennis, association football, chess, American football, athletics and test cricket. His siblings are Flora Amerley, Roselind Amorkor, Ashitei and Emily Amaakai.
