= Jacob Hackenburg Griffiths-Randolph =

Politician and Former Speaker of the Parliament of Ghana

The Right Honourable Jacob Hackenburg Griffiths-Randolph

Speaker of the Parliament of Ghana (Third Republic)
- In office 24 September 1979 – 31 December 1981
- Preceded by: Nii Amaa Ollennu; Second Republic
- Succeeded by: Daniel Francis Annan; Fourth Republic

Personal details
- Born: 6 September 1914 Accra, Gold Coast
- Died: 25 July 1986 (aged 71) Accra, Ghana
- Spouse: Frances Philippina Mann
- Children: 7, including Rebecca
- Education: Adisadel College; Inner Temple
- Occupation: Judge

Jacob Hackenburg Griffiths-Randolph (6 September 1914 – 25 July 1986) was a judge and also the Speaker of the Parliament of Ghana during the Third Republic. He was also the first Ghanaian to become Commissioner of Income Tax.

== Early life and education ==
He was born in Accra, Gold Coast on 6 September 1914. A descendant of the Euro-African Ga people, he attended the all-boys' Anglican boarding school, the Adisadel College, then joined John Holt trading company, rising to the position of Regional Manager and representing the company in Kumasi. Later, Griffiths-Randolph resigned and travelled to London in order to further his education. He successfully completed his legal education at Inner Temple In 1952, after which he returned to Ghana.

== Career ==
In 1959, during the First Republic of Ghana, President Kwame Nkrumah appointed him as Commissioner of Income Tax, the first African to hold that position. He went into exile in Togo in 1962, after criticising President Nkrumah in a church sermon, and being alerted of his imminent arrest, which led to his leaving the church and heading directly to the Togo border. While in Togo as a guest of the Togolese President Olympio, a coup occurred there and he escaped to Nigeria, from where he headed to England, and into exile for the next few years till President Nkrumah was overthrown in February 1966. He was appointed a Superior Court judge by the new government and served in Bolgatanga, Cape Coast, Tamale and finally Accra, where he was till he retired from the Bench in 1979.

With the handover of power by the military in September 1979, the 3rd Republic was born, and he was unanimously selected to be Speaker of Parliament. He served as Speaker of the Parliament of Ghana from 24 September 1979 until 31 December 1981, during the presidency of Dr.Hilla Limann, whose government was overthrown by Flight Lieutenant J. J. Rawlings.

== Family ==
Justice Griffiths-Randolph and his wife, Frances Philippina (née Mann), had seven children. Their daughter Rebecca, is married to Nana Addo Dankwa Akufo-Addo.

== Later life ==
Justice Griffiths-Randolph died on 25 July 1986, aged 72.

== Notes ==
Political offices
Preceded by Nii Amaa Ollennu; Second Republic	Speaker of the Parliament of Ghana; 1965 – 1966^{1}	Succeeded by Daniel Francis Annan; Fourth Republic
Notes and references
1.
