= Joseph Richard Asiedu =

Lawyer and Former Speaker of the Parliament of Ghana

The Right Honourable Joseph Richard Asiedu

3rd Speaker of the Parliament of Ghana
- In office July 1960 Deputy Speaker 1957. Speaker 1961 – June 1965
- Preceded by: Augustus Molade Akiwumi
- Succeeded by: Kofi Asante Ofori-Atta
- Constituency: MP Akuapem North 1956

Personal details
- Born: 3 January 1903 Larteh Akuapem
- Died: 14 November 1977 (aged 74) Korle Bu Teaching Hospital, Accra
- Party: CPP NO Party Posts, Member of Legislative Council
- Occupation: Regional Manager U.A.C.Ltd. Timber Contractor
- Helped with the establishment of Tetteh Quarshie Hospital at Akuapem Mampong to the memory of Tetteh Quarshie the man who first introduced Cocoa to Ghana

Justice Joseph Richard Asiedu (died before 1994) was a judge and also a Speaker of the Parliament of Ghana. He was appointed Speaker of Parliament in July 1960 in the First Republic of Ghana. He was the speaker until June 1965.

Political offices
Preceded by Augustus Molade Akiwumi	Speaker of the Parliament of Ghana; 1960 – 1965^{1}	Succeeded by Kofi Asante Ofori-Atta
Notes and references
1.
