= Parliament House of Ghana =

Seat of the Speaker of Parliament of Ghana

Parliament House
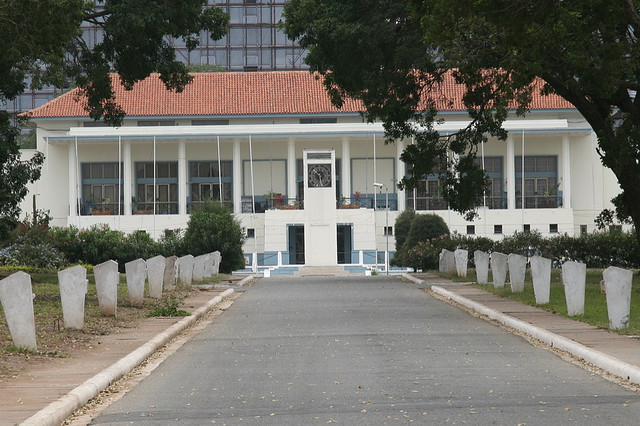
- The front of the building
- Interactive map of the Parliament House area

General information
- Architectural style: Eclectic
- Location: Accra, Ghana, East Ridge
- Coordinates: 05°33′24″N 00°11′24″W
- Current tenants: Parliament of Ghana
- Construction started: 1965
- Completed: 1965; 61 years ago
- Renovated: 2012–2013
- Cost: GH¢ 94.2 million

Design and construction
- Architect: Kwame Nkrumah

The Parliament House of Ghana is the official seat of the Speaker of Parliament of the country and also serves as Parliament of Ghana. It also has offices which serve temporal offices of certain members of parliament.

== History ==
The building was designed and built in 1965 by Kwame Nkrumah, the first president of Ghana.

== Calls for expansion ==
In 2011 Alfred Kwame Agbeshie, Member of Parliament for Ashaiman called for the building of a new parliament house to accommodate the increasing number of parliamentarians in the country. His assertion was based on the fact that members of parliament sat at distances away from the Speaker, making it difficult for some members to be recognized and allowed to contribute to debates.

== See also ==
- Job 600
