= Ebo Barton-Odro =

Ghanaian politician and lawyer

Ebo Barton-Odro is a Ghanaian politician and a former First Deputy Speaker of the Parliament of Ghana. He was the member of parliament for Cape Coast North constituency from 2008 to 2016.

== Early years and education ==
Barton-Odro was born in Saltpond, Central Region. He attended the Mfantsipim School and the Ghana School of Law and also obtained a bachelor's degree in law from the University of Ghana.

== Career ==
Barton-Odro is a lawyer. He served as the Head of Chambers of Barton and Partners. In 2009, he became a member of the Parliament of Ghana.

== Politics ==
Barton-Odro is a member of the National Democratic Congress (NDC) . He was the NDC member of parliament representative for the then Cape Coast Constituency. In 2008, under the ticket of the National Democratic Congress, he contested in the 2012 Ghanaian General Elections and won. In 2012, he contested again in the 2012 Ghanaian General Elections and won. He defeated the other contestants including Henrietta Abane and Sarah Mary Bucknor by obtaining 21,189 votes which represents 51.53% of the total votes cast.

== Personal life ==
Barton-Odro is a Christian. He is married with four children.
