= Nii Amaa Ollennu =

Ghanaian jurist and politician (1906–1986)

The Right Honourable Nii Amaa Ollennu JSC FGA
- Ollennu c. 1940s–50s

President of Ghana
- Acting; 7 August 1970 – 31 August 1970
- Prime Minister: Dr. K.A. Busia
- Preceded by: A.A. Afrifa
- Succeeded by: Edward Akufo-Addo

Speaker of the Parliament of Ghana Second Republic
- In office 1 October 1969 – 12 January 1972
- Preceded by: Kofi Asante Ofori-Atta (First Republic)
- Succeeded by: Jacob Hackenburg Griffiths-Randolph; Third Republic

Justice of the Supreme Court of Ghana
- In office 1 September 1962 – 1966
- Appointed by: Kwame Nkrumah
- President: Kwame Nkrumah

Personal details
- Born: 21 May 1906 Accra, Gold Coast
- Died: 22 December 1986 (aged 80)
- Party: Independent
- Spouse(s): Emily Jiagge; Charlotte Amy Sawyerr; Nana Afua Frema (Queen-mother of Wenchi)
- Relations: List: Kofi Abrefa Busia (brother-in-law); Nathan Quao (cousin); Amon Nikoi (nephew); Nicholas T. Clerk (nephew); George C. Clerk (nephew); Ashitey Trebi-Ollennu (nephew)
- Children: Amerley Ollennu (daughter)
- Education: Accra High School; Presbyterian Training College, Akropong; Middle Temple
- Profession: Lawyer; Jurist; Judge

Raphael Nii Amaa Ollennu JSC FGA (21 May 1906 – 22 December 1986) was a Ghanaian jurist and judge who served as a Justice of the Supreme Court of Ghana from 1962 to 1966. He briefly served as acting President of Ghana during the Second Republic in August 1970 and as the Speaker of the Parliament of Ghana from 1969 to 1972.

== Early life and education ==
Ollennu was born in Labadi, Accra, Gold Coast, in 1906 and belonged to the Ga people. His parents were Wilfred Kuma Ollennu and Salomey Anerkai Mandin Abbey. Ollennu attended the middle boarding school, the Salem School at Osu. He had his secondary education at Accra High School. Part of his earlier education was at the Presbyterian Training College at Akropong in the Eastern Region of Ghana, where he studied pedagogy and theology. He went to England to study jurisprudence at the Middle Temple, London, and was called to the Bar in 1940 after having taken 18 months to complete a three-year course passing with distinction – earning recognition from the Queen's Council.

== Legal career ==
The first person in his family to qualify as a lawyer, he was registered as Raphael Nii Amaa Ollennu in the Gold Coast (now Ghana) register in 1940. He later became a puisne judge in 1955, rising through the ranks of the Ghanaian judiciary to become a High Court judge and on 1 September 1962, elevated to a Justice of the Supreme Court of Ghana. He also published books on various legal topics and was an authority on traditional African land-tenure system. He was also an Honorary Professor of Law at the University of Ghana. He was also actively involved with the General Council of the World Alliance of Reformed Churches. He served as the President of the Ghana Academy of Arts and Sciences from 1969 to 1972.

== Politics ==
Nii Amaa Ollennu was one of the Accra representatives in the Gold Coast Legislative Assembly during the early 1950s. In 1950, he founded the National Democratic Party, becoming its leader. At the 1951 Gold Coast legislative election, the party failed to win any seats, and the following year, he led it into the Ghana Congress Party. Ollennu was thus in opposition alongside Busia and Danquah to Nkrumah's Convention People's Party.

=== Interim President of Ghana ===
During the second republic, Ollennu was the Speaker of the Parliament of Ghana from October 1969 to January 1972. He also became the acting president of Ghana on 7 August 1970. He was officially the chairman of the Presidential Commission. He took over from the previous military leader, Lt. Gen. Afrifa and handed over on 31 August 1970 to Edward Akufo-Addo, who was elected on 31 August 1970 by an electoral college. He polled 123 votes to 35 by Edward Asafu Adjaye. This was a ceremonial presidency as executive power was held by the prime minister, Kofi Abrefa Busia. During the Second Republic of Ghana, Ollennu served as Speaker of the Parliament of Ghana.

== Personal life ==
Nii Amaa Ollennu married four times. His first wife was Emily Jiagge of Keta in the Volta Region whose grandfather was Togbui Tamakloe, Chief of Uti. He had two children with her: Amerley Ollennu and Boni-Ashitey Ollennu, a barrister in London. He then married Charlotte Amy Sawyerr (née Mettle), the daughter of the Rev. John Josiah Mettle and Mrs. Marian Anohuma Mettle (née Harvey). They had two children together: Noni-Ashitey (Fio) and Ashitei. Mettle had five other children from another marriage. She died in 2016, aged 103 years. One of his wives was Nana Afua Frema Busia, the Queenmother of Wenchi and a sister to Dr. Kofi Abrefa Busia, Prime Minister of Ghana. A daughter of Justice Nii Amaa Ollennu and Nana Afua Frema Busia, Amerley Ollennu Awua-Asamoa, served as Ghana's Ambassador to Denmark from 2017 to 2021. Ollennu was a member of the District Grand Lodge of Ghana and a founding member of the Legon Lodge.

=== Family ===
Nii Amaa Ollennu was the cousin of the Quao siblings, including Nathan Quao (1915–2005), a diplomat, educationist and public servant who became a presidential advisor to many Heads of State of Ghana. The progeny of the Quaos included Amon Nikoi (1930–2002), an economist and diplomat, the Governor of the Bank of Ghana from 1973 to 1977 and Finance minister from 1979 to 1981 in addition to the brothers, Nicholas T. Clerk (1930–2012), a former Rector of the GIMPA and George C. Clerk (1931–2019), the botanist. Ashitey Trebi-Ollennu, a NASA robotics engineer, is Ollennu's nephew.

== Death ==
Nii Amaa Ollennu died in December 1986.

== See also ==
- Speaker of the Parliament of Ghana
- List of judges of the Supreme Court of Ghana
- Supreme Court of Ghana

== Bibliography ==
- Ollennu, Nii Amaa (1962). Principles of Customary Land Law in Ghana. Law in Africa Volume 2. London: Sweet and Maxwell. OCLC 877770.
- Humphrey, J.; Fiseer, N. A.; Ollennu, Nii Amaa (1966). The Law of Testate and Intestate Succession in Ghana. Law in Africa Volume 16. London: Sweet and Maxwell. B0000CN89R.
- Ollennu, Nii Amaa; Gordon R. Woodman (1985). Ollennu's Principles of Customary Land Law in Ghana (2nd ed.). Birmingham: CAL Press. ISBN 978-0-9510530-0-3.

Political offices
Preceded by Kofi Asante Ofori-Atta (1965 – 66)	Speaker of the Parliament of Ghana; Second Republic; 1969 – 71^{1}	Succeeded by Jacob Hackenburg Griffiths-Randolph (1979 – 81)
Preceded by Akwasi Afrifa; Military Head of state	President of Ghana (Chair of Presidential Commission); 1970	Succeeded by Edward Akufo-Addo
Notes and references
1. Source from Ghana Government
