= Speaker of the Parliament of Ghana =

Presiding officer of the Parliament of Ghana

The Speaker of the Parliament of Ghana is the presiding officer of the Parliament of Ghana. The current speaker, Alban Kingsford Sumana Bagbin, was sworn-in for a second term as Speaker of the Ninth Parliament of Ghana after his reelection on 7 January 2025; having served his first term from 7 January 2021 to January 6, 2025.

== History ==
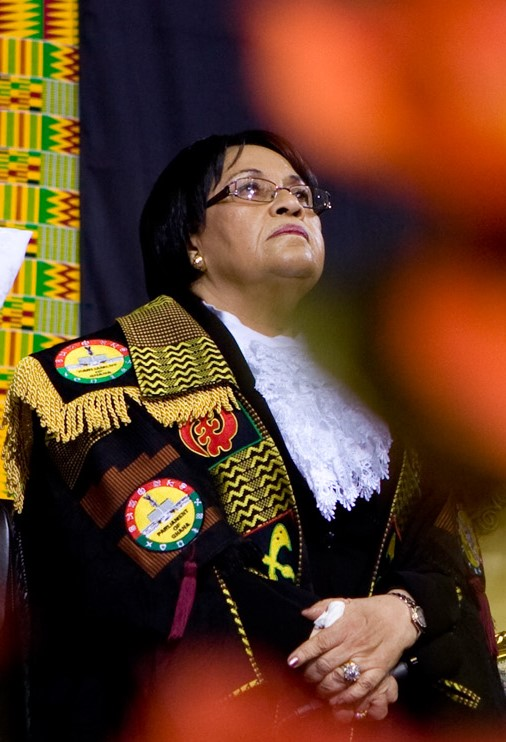
Joyce Bamford-Addo, First female Speaker of Parliament of Ghana

The office of the Speaker was first created in the then Gold Coast, under the Gold Coast(Constitution) Order in Council, 1950. Subsequent constitutions have provided for the election of the Speaker of the Parliament of Ghana.

The first speaker of the Parliament of Ghana was Sir Emmanuel Charles Quist who was Speaker of the National Assembly in 1951. He stayed at post till December 1957, a few months after Ghana gained independence.

Prior to Ghana's independence, the Governor of Ghana presided over the legislative council. This changed in 1949 when Emmanuel Quist became its first African president. The Legislative Council elected Quist as its first speaker in 1951.

Under the fourth republic, the longest serving speaker of parliament is Daniel Francis Annan who served from 7 January 1993 to 6 January 2001. In January 2009, Joyce Adeline Bamford-Addo became the first female speaker of the Ghanaian parliament. Alban Bagbin became only the second speaker to serve two terms in the fourth republic when he was elected on 7 January 2025 for a second term. Daniel Annan was the only other Speaker who got to serve for two terms.

== Appointment and Tenure of Office ==
Article 95 of the 1992 Ghana constitution provides that, the election of a speaker shall be from among the members of parliament or from persons who are qualified to be members of parliament. Where the speaker is elected from among the members of parliament, Article 97 of the constitution specifies that the Speaker vacates his or her seat in Parliament, triggering a by-election. The only person to have been in this position so far is Edward Adjaho who was the elected member for the then Akatsi South constituency.

== Deputy Speaker ==
There are two Deputy Speakers who are elected from among the members of parliament by the members. Both deputy speakers cannot be from the same political party. Currently, the Deputy Speakers are the MP for Bekwai, Joseph Osei-Owusu, of the New Patriotic Party and MP for Fomena, Andrew Asiamah Amoako, an Independent MP.

== Role ==
Article 101 of the Ghana Constitution stipulates that the Speaker presides at all sittings of parliament. Where the speaker is not able to do so, one of the two deputies presides. No parliamentary business can take place without the speaker in the chair.

The Office of the Speaker is the third highest office in Ghana after the president and vice president. Hence, the speaker may act on behalf of the president if neither the president nor the vice president is able to do so. The 1992 constitution stipulates that there should be an election within three months of the speaker assuming the presidency due to the death or removal of the president and vice president. The Speaker does not have a vote in parliament. This means that when the votes are tied, the motion is lost. The Speaker is also the chairman of the parliamentary Service Board. Additionally, the Speaker appoints four other members to this board. The sixth member of the board is the Clerk of Parliament.

== List of speakers ==
=== Legislative Council of the Gold Coast ===
President	Time frame	Period
Sir Emmanuel Charles Quist	1949 - 1951	Gold Coast
=== National Assembly of the Gold Coast ===
Speaker	Time frame	Period
Sir Emmanuel Charles Quist	1951 - 1957	Gold Coast
=== Parliament of Ghana ===
Speaker	Time frame	Period
Sir Emmanuel Charles Quist	March 1957 - December 1957	National Assembly
Augustus Molade Akiwumi	February 1958 - June 1960	National Assembly
Joseph Richard Asiedu	July 1960 - June 1965	1st Republic
Kofi Asante Ofori-Atta	June 1965 - February 1966	1st Republic
Nii Amaa Ollennu	October 1969 - January 1972	2nd Republic
Jacob Hackenbug Griffiths-Randolph	September 1979 - December 1981	3rd Republic
Daniel Francis Annan	January 1993 - January 2001	4th Republic (1st and 2nd parliaments)
Peter Ala Adjetey	January 2001 - January 2005	4th Republic (3rd parliament)
Ebenezer Sekyi Hughes	January 2005 - January 2009	4th Republic (4th parliament)
Joyce Adeline Bamford-Addo	January 2009 - January 2013	4th Republic (5th parliament); First female Speaker
Edward Doe Adjaho	January 2013 - January 2017	4th Republic (6th parliament)
Aaron Mike Oquaye	January 2017 - January 2021	4th Republic (7th parliament)
Alban Kingsford Sumana Bagbin	January 2021 - Incumbent	4th Republic (8th & 9th parliaments)

=== Demographics ===
Speaker	Ethnicity	Religious affiliation
Emmanuel Charles Quist	Euro-African/ Ga	Presbyterian
Augustus Molade Akiwumi	Yoruba	Anglican (later Christian Scientist)
Joseph Richard Asiedu	Akuapem (Akan)	Presbyterian
Kofi Asante Ofori-Atta	Akyem (Akan)	Presbyterian
Nii Amaa Ollennu	Ga	Presbyterian
Jacob Hackenburg Griffiths-Randolph	Ga	Anglican
Daniel Francis Annan	Ga	Methodist
Peter Ala Adjetey	Ga	Anglican
Ebenezer Sekyi Hughes	Fante (Akan)	Anglican
Joyce Adeline Bamford-Addo	English/Ga	Roman Catholic
Edward Adjaho	Avenor Ewe	Christian
Aaron Mike Oquaye	Ga	Baptist
Alban Kingsford Sumana Bagbin	Dagaaba	Roman Catholic

== See also ==
- Parliament of Ghana

Order of precedence
Preceded by Vice President of Ghana	Speaker of the Parliament of Ghana	Succeeded by Chief Justice of Ghana
