= Abor Senior High School =

Mixed second cycle institution in Abor, Volta Region, Ghana

Abor Senior High School, often referred to as ABORSCO, is a Ghanaian second-cycle institution in the town of Abor in the Keta Municipal District of the Volta Region in southeast Ghana. It is a public mixed school.The school was founded on 1st October 1965.

== History ==
The school was founded on 1 October 1965 as a community private school with 15 students through the leadership of the Chief, people, and members of the Abor Youth Association (AYA). The government took over the school in the year 1982, with 54 students and 10 teachers.

== School code ==
0070503

== School motto ==
Arise and Shine

== Vision ==
The School's vision is "Excelllent Students for the World"

== Mission ==
To provide inclusive and relevant education for all Ghanaians at entry level, equipping them with the knowledge, skills, and competencies needed to realize their potential, contribute to poverty reduction, and drive sustainable socio-economic growth and national development.

== School accommodation ==
Day/Boarding

== Gender ==
Mixed

== School category ==
Category C

== See also ==
- Education in Ghana
- List of senior high schools in Ghana
