= Sylvia Annoh =

Ghanaian diplomat

- Education: Ghana Institute of Management and Public Administration (GIMPA)

Sylvia Annoh is a Ghanaian diplomat and public servant. She was appointed Ghana's ambassador to Denmark in March 2021. Prior to her appointment, she was the spokesperson for the Electoral Commission of Ghana from 1993 to 2015.

== Education ==
Annoh had her Mater's degree in Leadership and Governance, and her Post Graduate Diploma in Public Administration from the Ghana Institute of Management and Public Administration (GIMPA). She holds a bachelor's degree from the Ghana Institute of Journalism (GIJ). As part of her educational endeavors she has pursued various courses in the field of Gender, and Election Management.

== Career ==
Annoh served as the spokesperson for the Electoral Commission of Ghana from 1993 to 2015. She later became the head of public affairs for the commission, and served in that capacity until 2021 when she was appointed Ghana's ambassador to Denmark in March that year.

In 1992, she served as the Public Relations Officer for the Consultative Assembly that was tasked to draft the 1992 Constitution. Over the years, she has trained several media personnel on accurate election and media reportage. She serves as a commission member of the National Commission for Civic Education (NCCE).

== Personal life ==
Annoh is married with three children. She is a Christian and a member of the Royal House International Church. In her leisure time, she likes to read, write, cook, sing and dance.
