= Peter Ala Adjetey =

Politician, lawyer and former Speaker of the Parliament of Ghana

The Right Honourable Peter Ala Adjetey

Speaker of the Parliament of Ghana
- In office 7 January 2001 – 6 January 2005
- Preceded by: Daniel Francis Annan
- Succeeded by: E. B. Sekyi-Hughes

Chairman of the New Patriotic Party
- In office 1995–1998
- Preceded by: B. J. Da Rocha
- Succeeded by: Samuel Odoi-Sykes

Chairman of the Greater Accra Branch of New Patriotic Party
- In office 1992–1995
- Preceded by: New position created
- Succeeded by: Samuel Odoi-Sykes

Parliamentary Leader of the United National Convention
- In office 1979–1981
- Preceded by: New position created
- Succeeded by: Position abolished

Member of Parliament for Kpeshie
- In office 1979–1981
- Preceded by: George Adjei Osekre (in Second Republic)

Personal details
- Born: 11 August 1931 Accra, Ghana
- Died: 15 July 2008 (aged 76) Accra, Ghana
- Party: New Patriotic Party (1992 -2008)
- Other political affiliations: United Nationalists Party (1969-1971); Justice Party (1970 -1972); United National Convention (1979-1981)
- Education: Accra Academy
- Alma mater: University of Ghana; University of Nottingham; Middle Temple
- Occupation: Barrister

Peter Ala Adjetey (11 August 1931 – 15 July 2008) was a Ghanaian politician and lawyer. He served as Speaker of the 3rd Parliament of Ghana's Fourth Republic from 2001 to 2005. A member of the New Patriotic Party, he was the party's National Chairman from 1995 to 1998. Adjetey previously served as Member of Parliament for Kpeshie from 1979 to 1981 in the Third Republic and as president of the Ghana Bar Association from 1985 to 1989.

== Early life ==
Peter Ala Adjetey was born on 11 August 1931 at La, a suburb of Accra.

Adjetey had his basic education at St. Paul's School at La and at Accra Bishop Boys' School. At Accra Academy, where he had his high school education, he was the editor of the school's journal and a prefect in the boarding house before his completion in 1951. Adjetey obtained the University of London's intermediate bachelor's degree after studies at the University College of the Gold Coast in 1954. Adjetey proceeded to the United Kingdom, where he graduated with a bachelor's degree in law from University of Nottingham in 1958. Adjetey was called to the Bar at Middle Temple in London in 1959. He returned to Ghana in the same year where he was also called to the bar.

== Career ==
From 1959 to 1962, Adjetey worked as a Law Officer with the Attorney General's department. He was a part-time lecturer at the Institute of Adult Education, University of Ghana between 1960 and 1962. He was also a part-time lecturer at the Ghana School of Law between 1964 and 1968. Adjetey served as secretary of the Ghana Bar Association from 1969 to 1971.

He also served on numerous boards at various times including membership of the Judicial Council of Ghana from 1984 to 1989. He was the President of the Ghana Bar Association between 1985 and 1989. He was appointed the President of the African Bar Association in 2000.

Adjetey was chairman of the board of governors of Accra Academy from 1988 to 1998 after previously being chairman of the school's Parent-Teacher Association (P. T. A.) from 1986 to 1988.

== Politics ==
Adjetey was the Member of Parliament for Kpeshie in the Third Republic of Ghana. He was also the leader of the United National Convention Parliamentary group during the same period. In 1995, he became Chairman of the New Patriotic Party (NPP), a position he held until 1998.

== Awards ==
Adjetey was awarded the national honour of the Order of the Volta in 2008. In that same year, he received an honorary doctorate from the University of Ghana.

== Death ==
Adjetey died on 15 July 2008 after a short illness.

Parliament of Ghana
| Preceded by Parties banned | Member of Parliament for Kpeshie; 1979–81 | Succeeded by Parties banned |
Political offices
| Preceded by Daniel Francis Annan | Speaker of the Parliament of Ghana; 2001–05 | Succeeded by Ebenezer Sekyi-Hughes |
