= Daniel Francis Annan =

Ghanaian politician and judge (1928–2006)

The Right Honourable Daniel Francis Annan

Speaker of the Parliament of Ghana (1st Speaker of the Fourth Republic)
- In office January 7, 1993 – January 6, 2001
- Preceded by: Jacob Hackenbug Griffiths-Randolph (Third Republic)
- Succeeded by: Peter Ala Adjetey

Personal details
- Born: November 7, 1928 Accra, Ghana
- Died: 16 July 2006 (aged 77) Accra, Ghana
- Party: National Democratic Congress
- Education: Accra Academy
- Occupation: Judge

Justice Daniel Francis Kweipe Annan (November 7, 1928 – July 16, 2006) was a Ghanaian politician and judge. He served as Speaker of the 1st & 2nd parliaments of Ghana's Fourth Republic from 1993 to 2001. He was a member of the Provisional National Defence Council which governed Ghana prior the Fourth Republic from 1985 to 1992, and was Chairman of the National Commission for Democracy within this period. Prior to joining the executive arm of government in 1985, he had been a judge of the Ghanaian Court of Appeal.

== Early life ==
Daniel Annan was born in Accra on 7 November 1928. His father, Victor Benjamin Annan was a merchant and treasurer of the Accra branch of the United Gold Coast Convention and his mother was named Mary Nyaniba Annan. Annan's maternal great-grandfather was the King of Gã State (known locally as Gã Maŋtsɛ) Tackie Tawia I of Accra, who reigned from 1862 to 1902.

Annan started his education at the primary section of King's College, Lagos, receiving his kindergarten education. He had his secondary education at Accra Academy from 1939 to 1945. Thereafter, he studied at the intermediate department at Achimota College from 1946 to 1948. Annan proceeded to the United Kingdom to study law at the University of Hull. He obtained the LL.B (Hons) degree in 1956 while there. He was called to the bar at the Middle Temple, UK, in 1958.

== Career ==
Justice Annan worked at the Attorney General's department in Accra, Ghana from 1958 to 1964. He rose from Assistant State Attorney, through State Attorney and finally worked as Senior State Attorney during that period. He joined the bench in 1964 as a Circuit Court Judge for two years. He was promoted High Court Judge in 1966 and then Appeal Court Judge in 1971. He served as the Stool Lands Boundaries Settlement Commissioner and also as a Member of the Legal Class Appointment Board from 1974 to 1976. Other positions held by Daniel Annan include Chairman of the Press Freedom and Complaints Committee of the Ghana Press Commission in 1980 and Chairman of the Ghana Police Council in 1984 as well as chairman, National Economic Commission in 1984.

== Politics and Speaker of Parliament ==
Daniel Annan was appointed a member of the ruling Provisional National Defence Council (PNDC) in 1984. He effectively became the deputy to Jerry Rawlings, the Head of state of Ghana and acted quite often when Rawlings was out of the country. The government also made him Chairman of the National Commission for Democracy in 1984 which was to oversee preparations to return Ghana back to democracy. On the inauguration of the fourth republic, Justice Annan was elected Speaker of Parliament in January 1993, a position he held during the second parliament of the fourth republic as well till 2001. During this period, he got to act as President of Ghana when both the President and Vice President were out of the country.

== Sports ==
Justice Annan loved sports. He was Chairman of the Ghana Boxing Promotion Syndicate from 1973 to 1976 and Chairman of the Ghana Boxing Authority from 1980 to 1982. He was also President of the Ghana National Olympic Committee (1983–1985).

== Honours ==
- Star of Ghana - one of the prestigious state awards.

== Death ==
Daniel Annan died on July 16, 2006, in Accra after a period of illness.

== Literature ==
- Dadzie, Nana Ato; Ahwoi, Kwamena (2010). Justice Daniel Francis Annan:In the Service of Democracy. Sub-Saharan Publishing. ISBN 978-9988647933.

Political offices
Preceded by Jacob Hackenbug Griffiths-Randolph (Third Republic)	Speaker of the Parliament of Ghana; 1993 – 2001	Succeeded by Peter Ala Adjetey
