= Parliament of Ghana =

Unicameral legislature of Ghana

Coordinates: 05°33′24″N 00°11′24″W

- 9th Parliament of the 4th Republic
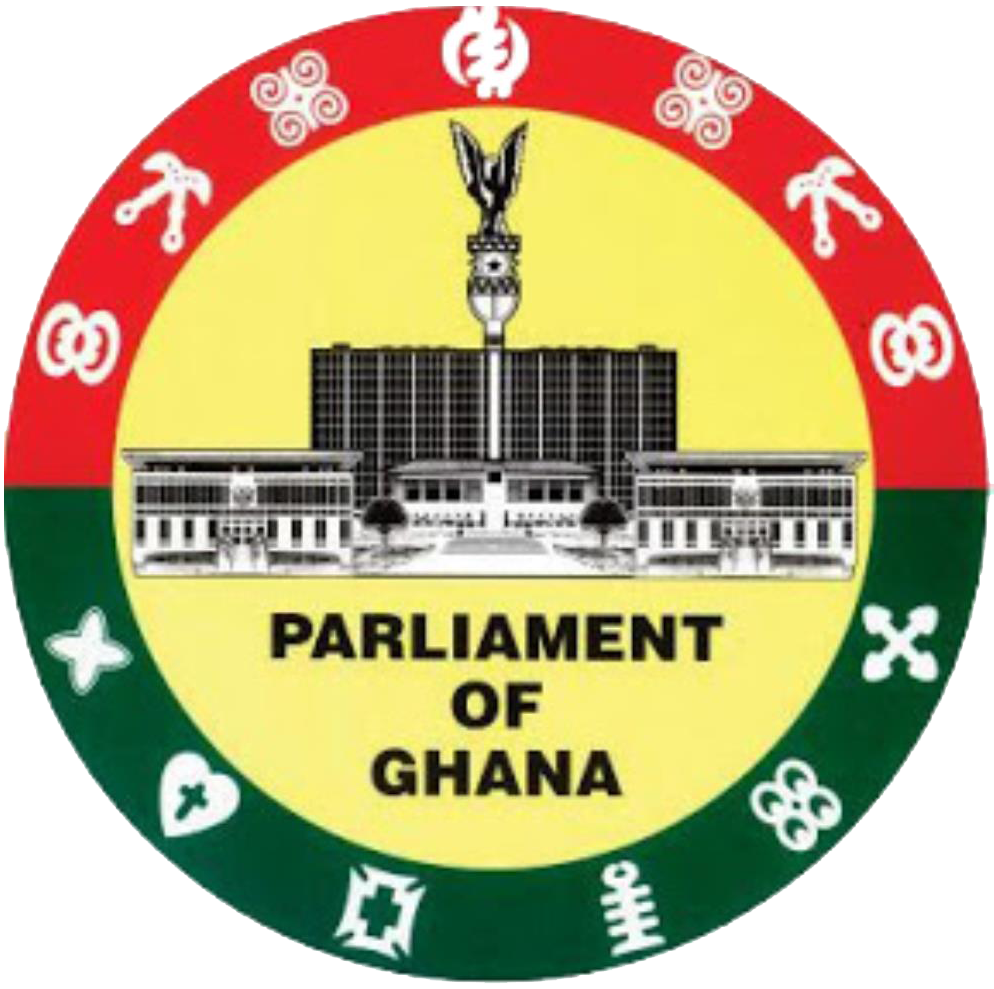

Type
- Type: Unicameral

Leadership
- Speaker: Getrude Takoono (NDC)
- First Deputy Speaker: Bernard Ahiafor (NDC)
- Second Deputy Speaker: Andrew Asiamah Amoako (NPP)
- Majority Leader: Mahama Ayariga (NDC)
- Minority Leader: Alexander Afenyo-Markin (NPP)

Structure
- Seats: 276
- Political groups: Majority (185): NDC (185); Minority (91): NPP (87); Independent (4)

Elections
- Voting system: First-past-the-post
- First election: 9 June 1965
- Last election: 7 December 2024
- Next election: 7 December 2028

Meeting place
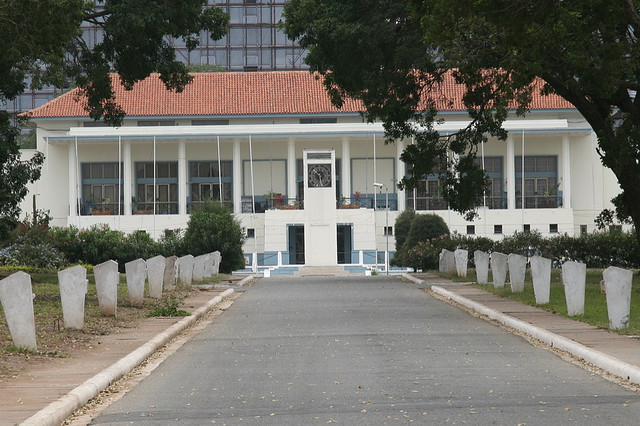
- Parliament House; Accra, Greater Accra; Republic of Ghana

Website
- www.parliament.gh

The Parliament of Ghana is the unicameral legislature of Ghana. It consists of 276 members, who are elected for four-year terms in single-seat constituencies using a first-past-the-post voting system.

== History ==
Legislative representation in Ghana dates back to 1850, when the country was a British colony known as Gold Coast. The body called the Legislative Council, was purely advisory as the governor exercised all legislative and executive powers. Reforms were introduced in 1916 and 1925, although the governor's power remained extensive. In 1946, a new constitution was introduced that allowed for an unofficial member of the Legislative Council to become its president while the governor ceased to be the ex officio president of the body. This system continued until 1951 when the Legislature elected its first speaker, Sir Emmanuel Charles Quist.

1951 was also the first year that elections based on universal suffrage was held. The Convention People's Party (CPP), formed in 1949 and led by Kwame Nkrumah, won the election that was held. Another party called the United Gold Coast Convention (UGCC) led by J.B. Danquah performed poorly and was disbanded soon after. Nkrumah, who had been jailed in early 1950 for subversion, was released and appointed Leader of Government Business, becoming the country's first prime minister in the following year.

Legislative assembly elections held in 1954 resulted in another CPP victory, with the party winning 71 out of a total of 104 seats. It also won 71 out of 104 seats in the 1956 legislative assembly election. The Gold Coast was renamed to Ghana and granted independence on Wednesday, 6 March 1957, while retaining the British monarch as head of state. The Legislative Assembly was renamed the National Assembly.

After the approval of a new Republican constitution, Ghana officially became a republic on 1 July 1960 with Kwame Nkrumah as its president. The plebiscite was taken as a fresh mandate from the people and the terms of National Assembly members were extended for another five years. A one-party state was introduced following a referendum in 1964. As a result, only CPP candidates stood in the National Assembly election held in 1965. Nkrumah was overthrown in 1966 by the military, which banned political parties and dissolved the National Assembly.

The country returned to civilian rule in 1969. Elections held on 29 August the same year resulted in victory for the Progress Party (PP) of Kofi Abrefa Busia, which won 105 of the National Assembly's 140 seats. He took office as Prime Minister on 3 September 1969. His government was toppled in a 1972 military coup.

During the Third Republic, which lasted from 1979 to 1981, the dominant party in the National Assembly was the People's National Party (PNP), led by Hilla Limann, which won 71 out of 104 seats in elections held on 18 June 1979. After the military intervened in 1981, all elected institutions were dissolved and political party activity was prohibited.

Parliament of the Fourth Republic

After 11 years of military rule, a new constitution was approved in a 1992 referendum. Presidential elections were held in November and were won by Jerry Rawlings, leader of the 1981 coup and subsequent military ruler. The opposition contested the results and boycotted the December parliamentary elections. As a result, Rawlings' National Democratic Congress (NDC) won 189 out of 200 seats in Parliament.

All parties participated in the 1996 parliamentary elections. The NDC won 133 out of a total of 200 seats, while the main opposition New Patriotic Party (NPP) won 60. Two smaller political party groups won the remaining seats.

The 2000 elections were significant in the sense that, President Rawlings was constitutionally barred from seeking another term. In the presidential poll, John Kufuor of the NPP defeated the NDC candidate John Atta Mills in a run-off election. In the 200-seat Parliament, the NPP won 100, followed by the NDC's 92. Smaller political party groups and independent candidates won the remaining seats.

Kufuor was re-elected in 2004 and the New Patriotic Party (NPP) won 128 out of 230 seats in the concurrent parliamentary election. The main opposition National Democratic Congress (NDC) won 94, while two other parties - The People's National Convention (PNC) and Convention People's Party (CPP) - won 4 and 3 seats respectively. Independent candidates captured the remaining seat.

The simple majority (or first past the post) voting system is used in Ghana's parliamentary elections. Since 2012, the country is divided into 275 single-member constituencies. Members serve four-year terms.

=== Leadership structure ===
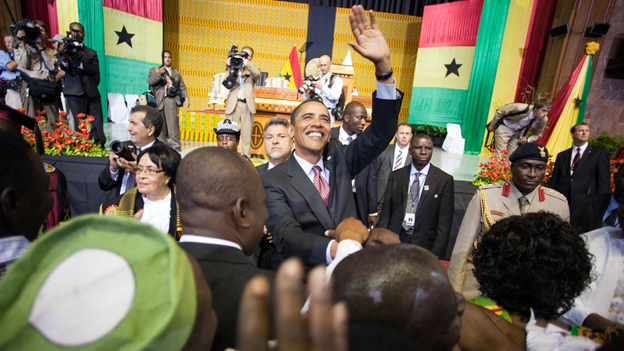
U.S. President Barack Obama shakes hands after delivering a speech to the Ghanaian Parliament at the Parliament House in July 2009.

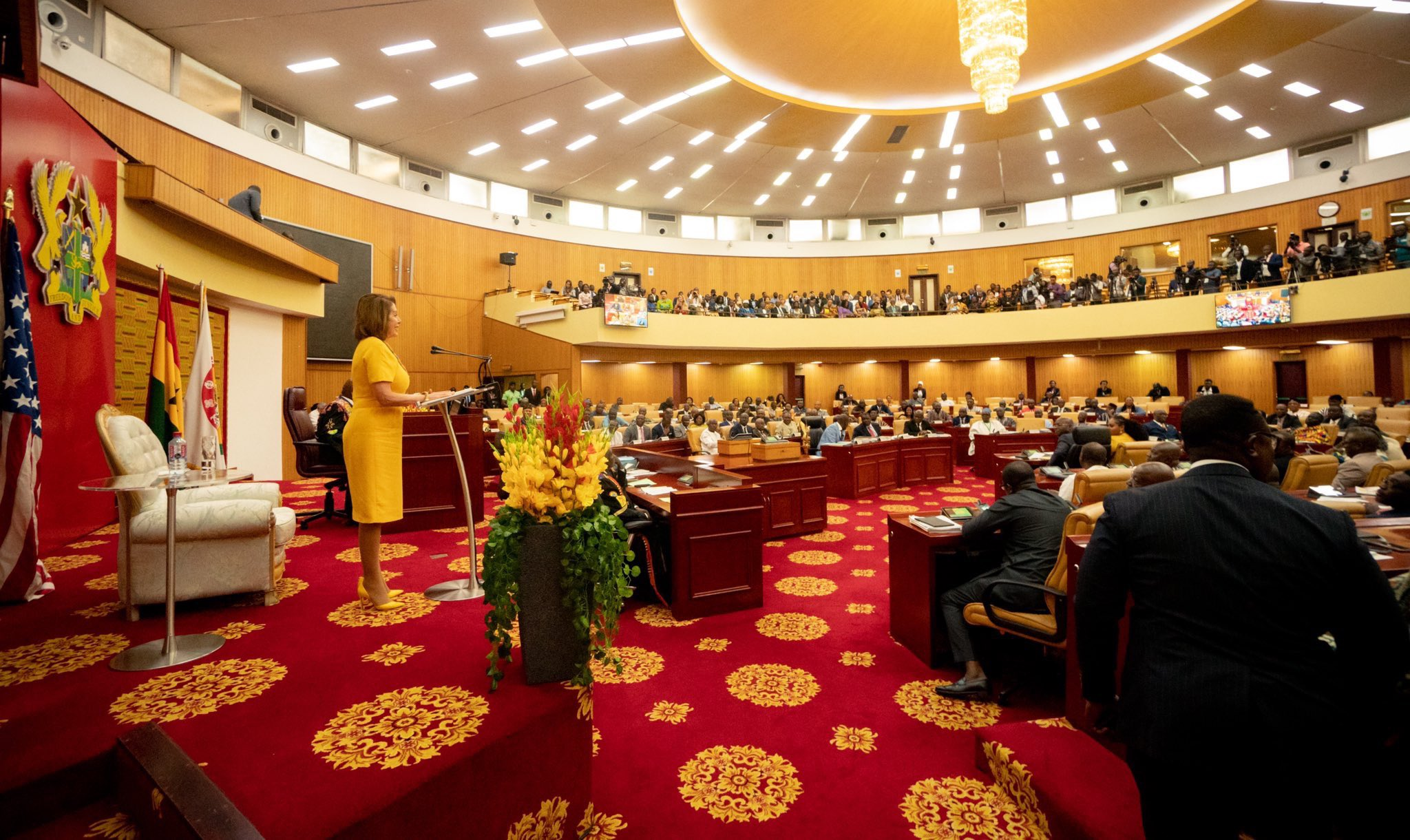
US Speaker Nancy Pelosi delivering a speech to the Ghanaian Parliament at the Parliament House in July 2019

- Speaker - The speaker presides over the Parliament and enforces observance of all rules that govern its conduct. After a general election, the majority party in Parliament in consultation with other parties nominates a speaker. The speaker cannot be a member of Parliament, though they must possess the qualifications to stand for elections as a member of Parliament. A person, on appointment as speaker, must resign and declare the seat occupied in Parliament as vacant. The speaker is assisted by two deputy speakers (first and second deputy speakers), who are elected at the commencement of every Parliament. They must come from different political parties. The current speaker is Alban Kingsford Sumani Bagbin.
- First deputy speaker - The first deputy speaker presides over the sittings of Parliament whenever the speaker is absent. The current first deputy speaker is Hon. Bernard Ahiafor of the National Democratic Congress (NDC).
- Second deputy speaker - The second deputy speaker presides over the sittings of Parliament in the absence of the speaker and the first deputy speaker. The current second deputy speaker is Andrew Amoako Asiamah an independent candidate.
- Majority leader - The majority leader is elected from the party with a majority of parliamentary seats. A deputy majority leader and a majority chief whip assist him, constituting the majority leadership of Parliament. The current majority leader is Mahama Ayariga of the NDC.
- Deputy majority leader- A deputy majority leader and a chief whip assist him, constituting the majority leadership of Parliament. The current deputy majority leader is Kweku George Ricketts Hagan of the NDC.
- Minority leader - The minority leader is elected from the second largest party in Parliament. A deputy minority leader and a chief whip assist him, constituting the minority leadership of Parliament. The current minority leader is Alexander Afenyo-Markin of the NPP.
- Deputy minority leader - A deputy minority leader and a chief whip assist him, constituting the minority leadership of Parliament. The current deputy minority leader is Patricia Appiagyei of the NPP.

=== 2020 elections ===
The distribution of seats among the parties following the 2020 general election is as follows.

=== Composition of Parliament after the 2018 Ghanaian new regions referendum ===
Region	NPP	NDC	Ind.	Total
Ahafo	4	2	-	6
Ashanti	42	4	1	47
Bono	6	6	-	12
Bono East	3	8	-	11
Central	10	13	-	23
Eastern	25	8	-	33
Greater Accra	14	20	-	34
Northern	9	9	-	18
North East	4	2	-	6
Oti	-	8	-	8
Savannah	3	4	-	7
Upper East	1	14	-	15
Upper West	3	8	-	11
Volta	1	17	-	18
Western	9	8	-	17
Western North	3	6	-	9
Total	137	137	1	275

== Committees of Parliament ==
As at November 2020, the Parliament had fourteen standing committees and sixteen select committees. There was also one ad hoc committee.

Standing committees:

Appointments • Business • Committee of Selection • Finance • Gender and Children
Government Assurance • House • Judiciary • Members Holding Offices of Profit • Privileges
Public Accounts • Special Budget • Standing Orders • Subsidiary Legislation

Select committees:

Communications • Constitutional, Legal and Parliamentary Affairs • Defence and Interior • Education • Employment, Social Welfare and State Enterprises
Environment, Science and Technology • Food, Agriculture and Cocoa Affairs • Foreign Affairs • Health • Lands and Forestry • Local Government and Rural Development
Mines and Energy • Roads and Transport • Standing Orders • Trade, Industry and Tourism • Works and Housing • Youth, Sports and Culture

Ad-hoc committee:
Poverty Reduction Strategy committee

== Past speakers of the National Assembly/Parliament ==
=== Gold Coast (1951–1957) ===
Speaker of the Legislative Assembly and National Assembly in 1957

Name	Took office	Left office	Notes
Emmanuel Charles Quist	March 1951	December 1957	

=== Independent state within the Commonwealth (1957–1960) / First Republic (1960–1966) ===
Ghanaian parliamentary election map, 2008

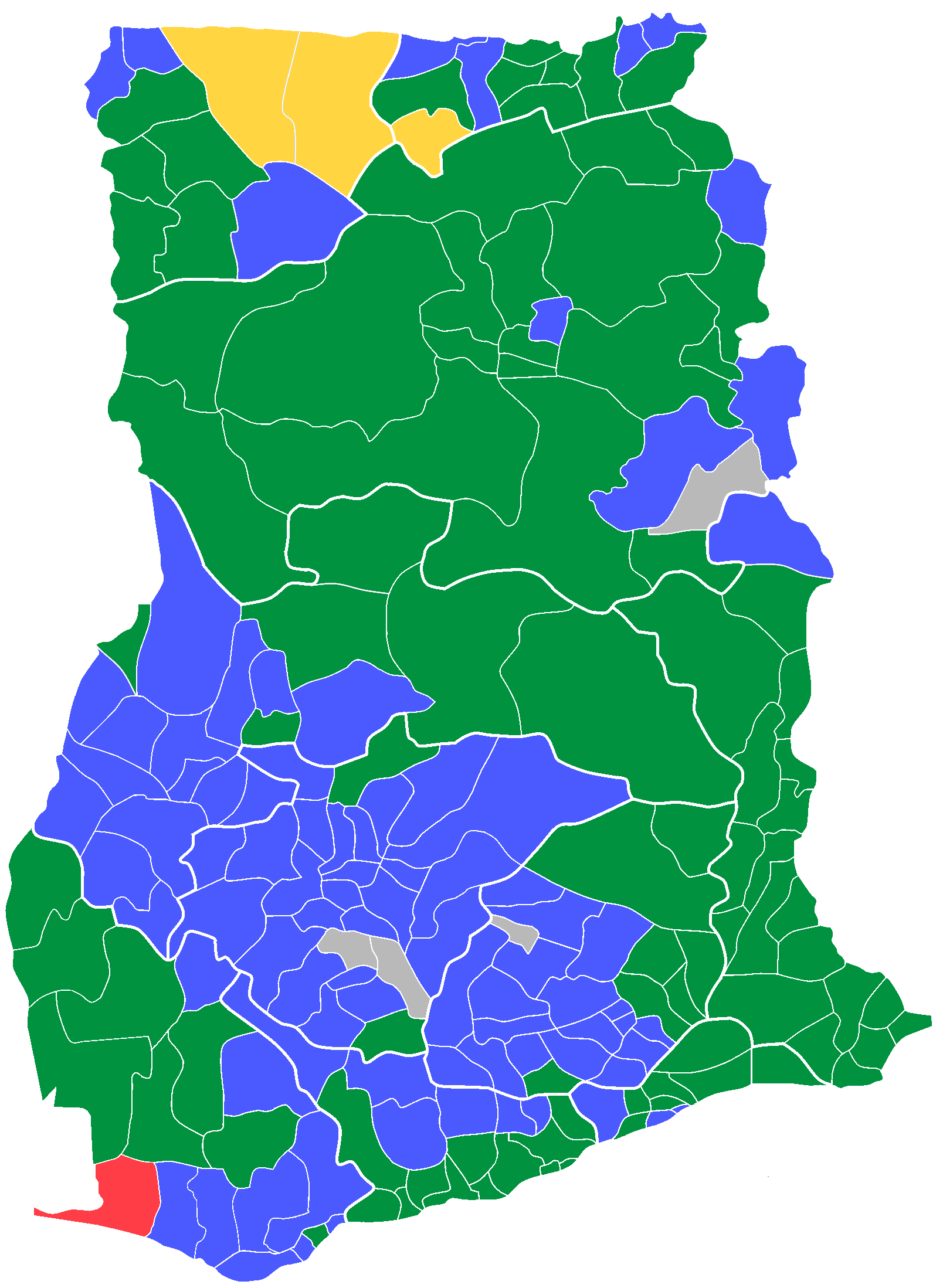
Map of Ghana's parliamentary constituencies as per MP's party affiliation as at 2008. NB: Where constituencies are too small to be shown (i.e. Accra and Tamale Metropolitan Areas) the majority party elected in the district is shown.

Green: National Democratic Congress (NDC) Blue: New Patriotic Party (NPP) Yellow: People's National Convention (PNC) Red: Convention People's Party (CPP)

Grey: Independent

Speakers of the National Assembly

Name	Took office	Left office	Notes
Augustus Molade Akiwumi	February 1958	June 1960	
Joseph Richard Asiedu	July 1960	June 1965	
Kofi Asante Ofori-Atta	10 June 1965	24 February 1966	

=== Second Republic (1969–1972) ===
Speaker of the National Assembly

Name	Took office	Left office	Notes
Nii Amaa Ollennu	October 1969	13 January 1972	

=== Third Republic (1979–1981) ===
Speaker of the National Assembly

Name	Took office	Left office	Notes
Jacob Hackenbug Griffiths-Randolph	24 September 1979	31 December 1981	

=== Fourth Republic (1992–present) ===
Speakers of Parliament

Name	Took office	Left office	Notes
Daniel Francis Annan	7 January 1993	6 January 2001	
Peter Ala Adjetey	7 January 2001	6 January 2005	
Ebenezer Sekyi Hughes	7 January 2005	6 January 2009	
Joyce Adeline Bamford-Addo	7 January 2009	6 January 2013	
Edward Adjaho	7 January 2013	6 January 2017	
Aaron Mike Oquaye	7 January 2017	6 January 2021	
Alban Sumani Bagbin	7 January 2021	Incumbent	

== Members of parliament ==
- For a list of current members, see List of MPs elected in the 2020 Ghanaian general election.

The composition of the Parliament has changed over the years. There were 140 members in both the Second and the Third Republic parliaments.

- 2nd Republic parliament: 1969–1972
- 3rd Republic parliament: 1979–1981

In the current Fourth Republic, the number of MPs first increased to 200 and subsequently to 275. There have been 8 parliaments so far in the Fourth Republic. The list of its members is below.

- 1st parliament: 1993–1997
- 2nd parliament: 1997–2001
- 3rd parliament: 2001–2005
- 4th parliament: 2005–2009
- 5th parliament: 2009–2013
- 6th parliament: 2013–2017
- 7th parliament: 2017–2021
- 8th parliament: 2021–2025
- 9th parliament 2025–present

== See also ==
- Speaker of the Parliament of Ghana
- Ghana
- History of Ghana
- Legislative Branch
- List of national legislatures
- List of Ghana Parliament constituencies
