= Imoru Ayarna =

Ghanaian businessman and politician (died 2015)

Imoro Ayarna

Founder and leader People's Action Party
- In office 1969–1972

Personal details
- Born: c. 1917
- Died: 11 July 2015 (aged 98)
- Party: People's Action Party
- Occupation: Entrepreneur

Imoru Ayarna (c. 1917 – 11 July 2015) was a Ghanaian businessman and politician. He was the founder and leader of the erstwhile People's Action Party in Ghana.

== 1969 parliamentary election ==
Ayarna formed the PAP after the ban on party politics was lifted in 1969. He teamed up with Dr. W.K. Lutterodt, People's Popular Party (PPP), the Republican Party of Mr. Quaidoo and Dr. John Bilson's All People's Congress. He contested the Ghanaian parliamentary election on 29 August 1969 for a seat in the Parliament of Ghana during the second republic. His party won 2 seats out of 140, although he lost his seat, winning a total of 693 votes and beating only the All People's Republican Party candidate, Asigiri Israel Dawudu who had 323 votes. The seat was taken by the Progress Party led by Kofi Abrefa Busia.

== Subversion trial ==
In late 1973, during the military rule of the National Redemption Council led by then Colonel I. K. Acheampong, he was tried along with others for plotting to overthrow the government by influencing then Colonel Robert Kotei, who was the Commander of the First Infantry Brigade at the time. His co-conspirators allegedly included Kojo Botsio, a former minister in the Nkrumah government, John Tettegah, a former general secretary of the All-African Trade Union Federation, Albert Kwaku Owusu Boateng, a journalist and Major Alexander Alanganona Awuviri, a Ghana Air Force officer. They all pleaded not guilty but were sentenced to death by firing squad after the trial though their sentences got commuted to life imprisonment later by the Head of state of Ghana, Colonel Acheampong.

== 1979 presidential election ==
In 1979, he contested the Ghanaian presidential election as an Independent candidate, winning 0.27% of the total votes cast.

== See also ==
- 1969 Ghanaian parliamentary election
- 1979 Ghanaian presidential election
- People's Action Party (Ghana)
