= Francis Asuah Amalemah =

Ghanaian politician

Member of the Ghana Parliament for Nzema West
- In office 1969–1972
- Preceded by: John Benibengor-Blay
- Succeeded by: Constituency abolished

Personal details
- Citizenship: Ghana
- Education: University of Cape Coast
- Occupation: Teacher and Farmer

Francis Asuah Amalemah is a Ghanaian politician and member of the first parliament of the second republic of Ghana representing Nzema West constituency under the membership of the People's Action Party (PAP).

== Early life and education ==
Francis was born on 1934. He attended University of Cape Coast (UCC), University of Dakar, and L'Institute de Touraine. Where he obtained Teachers' Training Certificate, and his Bachelor of Arts in Education in French respectively. He later worked as a Teacher and Farmer before going into Parliament.

== Career and Politics ==
Amalemah is a farmer and a teacher by profession. He began his political career in 1969 when he became the parliamentary candidate for the People's Action Party (PAP) to represent the Nzima West constituency prior to the commencement of the 1969 Ghanaian parliamentary election.

He was sworn into office as a member of the First Parliament of the Second Republic of Ghana on 1 October 1969, after being pronounced winner at the 1969 Ghanaian election held on 26 August 1969. His tenure of office as a member of parliament ended on 13 January 1972.
