= Patrick Kwame Kusi Quaidoo =

Ghanaian politician (1924–2002)

Member of the Ghana Parliament for Amenfi-Aowin
- In office 1957–1961
- Succeeded by: James Kwame Twum

Member of the Ghana Parliament for Amenfi
- In office 1969–1972

Minister for Trade and Labour
- In office 1957–1958
- President: Dr. Kwame Nkrumah

Minister for Communication
- In office 1958–1958
- President: Dr. Kwame Nkrumah

Minister for Commerce and Industry
- In office 1958–1959

Minister for Social Welfare
- In office 1960–1961
- President: Dr. Kwame Nkrumah

Personal details
- Born: 15 March 1924 Opon Valley, Gold Coast
- Died: 1 January 2002 (aged 77) Accra, Ghana
- Citizenship: Ghanaian
- Education: St. Augustine's College, University of Bristol

Patrick Kwame Kusi Quaidoo (1924–2002) was a Ghanaian politician and businessman. He served in various ministerial portfolios in the first republic and also served as a member of parliament in the first and second republic. He was the founder of the Republican Party and a founding member and leader of the All People's Republican Party.

== Early life and education ==
He was born on 15 March 1924 at Opon Valley in the Western Region of Ghana.

His early education begun in 1933 at Dunkwa Catholic School completing in 1940. He entered St. Augustine's College where he had his secondary education from 1941 to 1944. He continued at Achimota College intermediate department from 1946 to 1948. He proceeded to the United Kingdom for his Bachelor of Arts degree at the University of Bristol.

== Career ==
After his studies at St. Augustine's College, he took up a year teaching appointment in the school prior to his studies at Achimota College. He later returned to teach at St. Augustine's College on two occasions; from 1948 to 1949 and from 1953 to 1954. In 1967 a year after the Nkrumah overthrow, he was appointed Chairman of Black Star Line.

== Politics ==
His political career officially begun in 1954 when he was elected a member of parliament in the pre independent Ghana, he was a backbencher in parliament. He was elected once more in 1957 as a member of parliament representing the Amenfi-Aowin constituency. In 1956 he was appointed ministerial secretary (deputy minister) to the ministry of trade and labour. A year later he was promoted to minister of trade and labour. He served in that capacity for a year. In 1958 he was appointed minister of communications, that same year he was moved to the ministry of Commerce and Industry as its minister. In 1960 he was appointed minister for Social Welfare. During his tenure as the minister for Social Welfare he questioned the press for "immortalising" Nkrumah. He was dismissed on 22 May 1961 and incarcerated under the Preventive Detention Act.

Prior to the inception of the second republic in 1969, he together with Dr. John Bilson founded the Third Force Party. Quaidoo broke out of the party due to misunderstandings and internal leadership struggles, he founded the Republican Party a few weeks later. The party merged with Dr. V. C. De Graft Johnson's All People's Party to form the All People's Republican Party. During the 1969 Ghanaian parliamentary election he was the only member of the party to secure a seat in parliament. He represented the Amenfi constituency in parliament and was elected onto the opposition front bench from 1969 until 1972 when the Busia government was overthrown. In 1970, various opposition parties merged to form the Justice Party and he was made deputy chairman of the party.

== Honours ==
He was decorated as a Knight Companion of the Lion of Judah by the late Emperor Haile Selassie of Ethiopia. He was also given the honorary Key to the City of Tokyo.

== Personal life ==
He was married to Victoria Quaidoo (née Wood). Together they had four daughters and two sons. His hobbies included; playing the piano and the violin, and also playing table tennis. He is a Christian.

== Death ==
He died on 1 January 2002 in Accra after a short illness.

== See also ==
- Minister for Trade and Industry (Ghana)
- 1969 Ghanaian parliamentary election
