= Timothy Amihere Mensah =

Ghanaian politician

Member of the Ghana Parliament for Nzema East
- In office 1969–1972
- Preceded by: New
- Succeeded by: Isaac Chinebuah

Personal details
- Born: June 1916
- Citizenship: Ghana
- Education: University of Exeter; Trinity Hall, Cambridge
- Occupation: Lawyer

Timothy Amihere Mensah is a Ghanaian politician and member of the first parliament of the second republic of Ghana representing Nzema East Constituency under the membership of the People's Action Party (PAP).

== Education and early life ==
He was born in June 1916 in Western Region of Ghana. He obtained his Bachelor and Masters degree of Laws from University of Exeter, United Kingdom and he also attended Trinity Hall.

== Politics ==
Mensah was a Member of the First Parliament of the Second Republic of Ghana representing the Nzema East Constituency in the Western Region of Ghana on the ticket of the People's Action Party (PAP). He was elected in 1969 Ghanaian parliamentary election of the parliamentary term of the 1st Parliament of the 2nd Republic of Ghana. The Parliament started on 1 October 1969 and was suspended following the overthrow of the Busia government on 13 January 1972.

== Personal life ==
He was a Christian. He worked as a barrister.

== See also ==
- Busia government
- List of MPs elected in the 1969 Ghanaian parliamentary election
