= Anokye =

Anokye is a surname. Notable people with the surname include:

- Gabriel Justice Yaw Anokye (born 1960), Ghanaian bishop
- Ivan Anokye Mensah (born 2004), Ghanaian football defender
- Joseph Anokye, Ghanaian football politician
- Kwasi Anokye Gyimah, Ghanaian judge

== See also ==
- Komfo Anokye Teaching Hospital in Kumasi, Ghana
