= People's Action Party (Ghana, 1969–1970) =

Political party in Ghana

- Leader: Imoru Ayarna
- Founder: Imoru Ayarna
- Founded: 1969
- Dissolved: 1970
- Merged into: Justice Party with National Alliance of Liberals and United Nationalist Party
- National affiliation: Ghana
- Parliament (1969-1970): 2 / 140

The People's Action Party (PAP) was a political party in Ghana during the Second Republic (1969-1972). In elections held on 29 August 1969, the PAP won 2 out of 140 seats in the National Assembly. The party's leader and founder was Imoru Ayarna.

== Election results ==
The party was one of five to contest the 1969 Ghanaian parliamentary election. The party won two seats in the Western Region of Ghana. These were the Nzema West constituency which was won by Francis Asuah Amalemah and the Nzema East seat won by Timothy Amihere Mensah Imoru Ayarna himself also contested the elections but did not win a seat.

=== Parliamentary elections ===
Election	Number of PAP votes	Share of votes	Seats	+/-	Position	Outcome
1969	51,125	3.40%	2	▲	▲4th	Opposition

== Merger ==
In October 1970, the PAP together with the National Alliance of Liberals (NAL) and the United Nationalist Party (UNP) merged to form the Justice Party to provide a unified opposition in parliament.
