= Trade and pilgrimage routes of Ghana =

The trade and pilgrimage routes of Ghana are located in the Bono, Bono East, Ahafo, Savannah, North East, Northern, and Upper East Regions of northern Ghana. The routes were used by Bono people, Mandé warriors, Islamic traders and missionaries.

== Site description ==
The sites along the trade routes are typified by the Sudanic and Djenne style mosques that were influenced by the Islamic traders who frequented the routes in search of gold and slaves. Along the way they converted much of the population of the region to Islam which led to the construction of the mosques. The mosques themselves are constructed of local timber and mud-brick (cow dung and soil), and require constant maintenance thus necessitating broad conservation efforts.

== History ==
The trade routes were established as early as the 1st century AD following the introduction of the camel, but were most active from the Middle Ages onward.

== World Heritage Status ==
This site was added to the UNESCO World Heritage Tentative List on January 17, 2000, in the Cultural category.
