= All People's Republican Party =

Political party in Ghana

The All People's Republican Party (APRP) was a political party in Ghana during the Second Republic (1969–1972). In elections held on 29 August 1969, the APRP won 1 out of 140 seats in the National Assembly. On 20 October 1970, the APRP, the National Alliance of Liberals, and the United Nationalist Party merged into a single organization, the Justice Party.

== Parliamentary elections ==
Election	Votes	%	Seats	+/–	Position	Government
1969	27,328	1.82%	1 / 140	New	5th	Opposition
Source: African Elections Database

The sole member of the party to enter parliament was P. K. K. Quaidoo who became the MP for the Amenfi constituency.
