= Kwasi Anokye Gyimah =

Ghanaian judge

Kwasi Anokye Gyimah is a Ghanaian judge and legal academic. He is a Justice of the Court of Appeal Ghana, having being appointed in October 2025. He previously served as a Justice of the High Court of Ghana, where he was associated with the Land Court in Accra and later served in Kumasi. He has handled civil, property, commercial, and criminal proceedings during his judicial career.

Gyimah became particularly known publicly in 2023 when he was assigned to take over the trial of the former Chief Executive Officer of the Ghana Cocoa Board (COCOBOD), Stephen Kwabena Opuni, and ruled the that the trial should begin again. The decision was later overturned on appeal. He was subsequently transferred from Accra to Kumasi.

== Early life and education ==
Gyimah studied law at the University of Ghana, Legon and subsequently attended the Ghana School of Law. A professional legal directory records his Bachelor of Laws degree from the University of Ghana in 2000, his Barrister-at-Law qualification from the Ghana School of Law in 2002, and a Master of Laws from the University of Ghana in 2003.

He later pursued postgraduate study at the University of Nottingham in the United Kingdom, where he obtained an LLM in International Criminal Justice and Armed Conflict in 2005.

== Legal career ==
Before becoming a judge, Gyimah practiced law in Ghana. A professional legal directory lists him as an associate at Sam Okudzeto and Associates in Accra and identifies civil litigation, property law, family law and commercial law among the areas in which he practiced. He later joined the Ghanaian judiciary and became a Justice of the High Court.

The Judicial Service of Ghana's 2015–2016 Annual Report listed Gyimah as a Justice of the High Court assigned to the Land Court in Accra. The following Judiciary Service annual report for 2017–2018 again listed him as a High Court Judge, also at the Land Court in Accra. The Judicial Service continues to list him among Ghana's High Court in its online judicial directory.

== High Court career ==
As a High Court judge, Gyimah served in the Land Court in Accra. The Land Court deals primarily with disputes involving land ownership, interests in land, property rights and related matters under Ghanaian law. His Judicial work was not limited to land matters. Public reports also identifies him in proceedings involving civil and criminal matters.

In 2023, he was assigned to preside over the ongoing criminal case involving the former COCOBOD chief executive Stephen Opuni, businessman Seidu Agongo and Agricult Ghana Limited.

=== Stephen Opuni trial ===
Gyimah's most widely reported High Court proceeding was his involvement in the long-running criminal trial of Stephen Opuni and others. The case Began in 2018 and involved allegations relating to the purchase and distribution of Lithovit liquid fertilizer during Opuni's time as the Chief Executive Officer of COCOBOD. The accused persons faced charges including financial loss to the state. they denied the allegations.

The trial was initially presided over by Justice Clemence Honyenuga, a Supreme Court Justice who was sitting with additional responsibility as a High Court Judge. After Honyenuga retired in March 2023, the case was reassigned to Gyimah. After taking over the case, Gyimah ruled in April 2023 that the trial should begin afresh rather than continue from the point at which the previous judge has stopped. His reasoning included concerns about fairness and circumstances surrounding the previous proceedings.

The Attorney-General challenged the ruling at the Court of Appeal. The Court of Appeal subsequently overturned Gyimah's decision and directed that the proceedings should not start from the beginning.
