= 1992 Ghanaian constitutional referendum =

- 28 April 1992

Results
Choice	Votes	%
Yes	3,408,119	92.59%
No	272,855	7.41%

A referendum on a new constitution was held in Ghana on 28 April 1992. The new constitution provided for the reintroduction of multi-party politics and the division of powers between the president and parliament.

In order to be approved, a minimum of 70% of votes had to be in favour of the new constitution, while voter turnout had to be at least 35%. Both criteria were met, with 93% of voters approving the new constitution.

== Background ==
In December 1981 Jerry Rawlings had come to power in a military coup. The Provisional National Defence Council was established to rule the country. In 1984, the PNDC created a National Commission on Democracy to study ways to establish participatory democracy in Ghana. The commission issued a "Blue Book" in July 1987 outlining modalities for district-level elections, which were held in late 1988 and early 1989, for newly created district assemblies. One-third of the assembly members are appointed by the government.

Under international and domestic pressure for a return to democracy, the PNDC allowed the establishment of a 258-member Consultative Assembly made up of members representing geographic districts as well as established civic or business organizations. The assembly was charged to draw up a draft constitution to establish a fourth republic, using PNDC proposals. The PNDC accepted the final product without revision, and it was put to a vote.

== Results ==
Choice	Votes	%
For	3,408,119	92.59
Against	272,855	7.41
Total	3,680,974	100.00
Registered voters/turnout	8,255,690	–
Source: African Elections Database

== Aftermath ==
On 18 May 1992, the ban on party politics was lifted in preparation for multi-party elections. The PNDC and its supporters formed a new party, the National Democratic Congress (NDC), to contest the elections. Presidential elections were held on November 3 and parliamentary elections on December 29 of that year. Members of the opposition boycotted the parliamentary elections, however, which resulted in a 200-seat parliament with only 17 opposition party members and two independents.

The new constitution entered into force on 7 January 1993, to found the Fourth Republic. On that day, Rawlings was inaugurated as president and members of parliament swore their oaths of office. In 1996, the opposition fully contested the presidential and parliamentary elections, which were described as peaceful, free, and transparent by domestic and international observers. Rawlings was re-elected with 57% of the popular vote.
