= Justice Party (Ghana) =

Political party in Ghana

The Justice Party (JP) was a political party in Ghana formed to oppose the government of Kofi Busia during the Second Republic (1969–1972).

The Justice Party grew out of a merger between the National Alliance of Liberals, the People's Action Party, the United Nationalist Party and the All People's Republican Party in 1970. Its leader, E. R. T. Madjitey, supported the 1972 military coup by Ignatius Kutu Acheampong which ended the Second Republic.
