= Horace Kofi-Sackey =

Ghanaian lawyer and politician

Horace Walter Kofi Sackey

Member of the Ghana Parliament for Bantama Constituency
- In office 1969–1972
- Preceded by: Sulemanu Kwame Tandoh
- Succeeded by: Kwabena Adai Mensah

Ministerial Secretary for Works
- In office 1969–1972
- President: Edward Akufo-Addo
- Prime Minister: Kofi Abrefa Busia
- Minister: Samuel Wilberforce Awuku-Darko

Personal details
- Born: Horace Walter Kofi-Sackey; 2 August 1932 Gold Coast
- Education: Accra Academy; Achimota College
- Alma mater: London School of Economics

Horace Walter Kofi-Sackey was a Ghanaian lawyer and a politician who served as member of parliament in the Second Republic representing Bantama Constituency in the Ashanti Region of Ghana. He also held office as Ministerial Secretary (deputy minister) for Works in the Busia government.

== Early life and education ==
Kofi-Sackey was born on 2 September 1932. He was educated at the Accra Academy from 1947 to 1950. He proceeded to Achimota College from 1950 to 1952 for his sixth form education. He continued at the London School of Economics, a constituent college of the University of London from 1954 to 1957.

== Career and politics ==
Kofi-Sackey was called to the bar at Lincoln's Inn on 24 June 1958 and the Ghana bar on 24 July 1958. He entered private legal practice that same year. He practised in Kumasi. He was a member of the Ashanti Bar Association (the Ashanti Regional branch of the Ghana Bar Association) and also became president of the association.

In 1969, he was elected as a member of parliament for Bantama a constituency in the Ashanti Region of Ghana on the ticket of the Progress Party. He contested with Bonsu Osei-Tutu of the National Alliance of Liberals and Samuel Kwabena Danso of the United Nationalist Party. That same year he was appointed deputy minister for Works. He served in that position until 1972 when the Busia government was overthrown.

He and other top officials of the then erstwhile Progress Party were arrested without trial and detained for fifteen months. A ban was formally placed on all political parties and political activities on 16 January 1972, three days after the coup d'état. A committee was set up to investigate the assets of top officials of the party of which he was included on 9 February 1972. The adverse findings levelled against him and other party members by the committee were revoked by a review tribunal in 1979. He and some members of the party namely; Haruna Esseku, Bukari Adama and Alhaji Bukari consequently filed petitions against the adverse findings of the committee which was in turn dismissed by the tribunal.

== Personal life ==
Kofi-Sackey married Valerie Lindoe in 1957. She was head of the Castle Information Bureau during the Provisional National Defence Council era. Valerie Sackey was a teacher at Opoku Ware School; and also an officer with the Department of Game and Wildlife. They had three children; Michael, Joseph and Anne.

== See also ==
- List of MPs elected in the 1969 Ghanaian parliamentary election
- Busia government
