= Maxima, Kumasi =

Maxima
- Town
- Country: Ghana
- Time zone: UTC+0 (Casablanca)

Maxima is a town in Ghana. It is 10 kilometres from the centre Kumasi. It is a dormitory town. It serves mainly as a residential areas for workers in various companies in Kumasi. The town also has several students hostels for KNUST. In July 2011, certain parts of the town were flooded along with several other town in Kumasi.

== Boundaries ==
The town is bordered on the north by KNUST campus, to the West by Bomso, to the east by Ayigya and to the South by Asokore Mampong.
