= Anthony Hugh Selormey =

Ghanaian soldier and politician

Member of the National Redemption Council
- In office 13 January 1972 – October 1975
- President: Colonel I. K. Acheampong

Commissioner for Health
- In office 1 May 1973 – 1975
- President: Colonel I. K. Acheampong
- Preceded by: Colonel J. C. Adjeitey
- Succeeded by: Brigadier Odartey-Wellington

Commissioner for Transport and Communications
- In office 1972–1973
- President: Colonel I. K. Acheampong
- Preceded by: Jatoe Kaleo
- Succeeded by: Major Kwame Asante

Commissioner for Information
- In office January 1972 – May 1972
- President: Colonel I. K. Acheampong
- Succeeded by: Colonel Acheampong

Personal details
- Born: 2 March 1937 (age 89)
- Citizenship: Ghanaian
- Profession: Soldier

Military service
- Allegiance: Ghana Armed Forces
- Branch/service: Ghana Army
- Rank: Colonel
- Unit: Armoured Reconnaissance Regiment
- Commands: Second in Command

Anthony Hugh Selormey is a Ghanaian soldier and politician. He was one of the members of the National Redemption Council (NRC) which overthrew the Progress Party government of Kofi Abrefa Busia on 13 January 1972. He also served briefly in the Supreme Military Council government which followed the NRC.

== Early life and education ==
Selormey was born at Dzelukope, a town near Keta in the Volta Region. His secondary education was at the Bishop Herman College at Kpandu in the Volta Region where he graduated in 1958.

== Military career ==
In 1961, he entered the Ghana Military Academy at Teshie, near Accra and was commissioned into the Ghana Army in April 1962. He attended the Royal Armoured Corps Centre at Bovington Camp in the United Kingdom. He is reported to be the first Ghanaian soldier to undergo tank warfare training at the Armour School, Fort Knox, United States in 1967. He also did other military courses at the United States Intelligence School.

He later became an instructor at the Ghana Military Academy at Teshie for three years. He rose to the rank of Major and served as the Second in Command of the Armoured Reconnaissance Regiment prior to the coup d'état in January 1972.

== Politics ==
Selormey is believed to be one of the core planners of the 13 January coup. Together with him were Major K. B. Agbo and Major Kwame Baah. He became the Commissioner for Information following the coup. Later that year, he was appointed Commissioner for Transport and Communications. In May 1975, he was appointed the Commissioner for Health. He continued briefly in this capacity until the National Redemption Council was replaced by the Supreme Military Council in October 1975. He was promoted to the rank of colonel at the same time.

== See also ==
- National Redemption Council.
- Supreme Military Council, Ghana

Political offices
Preceded by ?	Minister for Information; 1972–1972	Succeeded by Colonel Acheampong
Preceded by Jatoe Kaleo	Minister for Transport; 1972–1973	Succeeded by Major Kwame Asante
Preceded by Colonel J. C. Adjeitey	Minister for Health; 1973–1975	Succeeded by Brigadier Odartey-Wellington
