= Jasikan =

- District capital
- Location of Jasikan
- Coordinates: 07°24′39″N 00°28′01″E
- Country: Ghana
- Region: Oti Region
- District: Jasikan District
- Elevation: 220 m (720 ft)
- Time zone: GMT
  - Summer (DST): GMT

Jasikan is a small town and is the capital of Jasikan district, a district in the Oti Region of Ghana. It is home to Bueman Secondary School and Jasikan College of Education. It is the local business hub for Buem enclave and the seat of government for the district. The main languages in the area are Leleme (a Guan Language), and cocoa is the cash crop.

== Geography ==
=== Location ===
Jasikan lies 260 kilometres (160 mi) north-east of Accra, the capital of Ghana.

== See also ==
- Jasikan District
- Buem (Ghana parliament constituency)

== External links and sources ==
- Ghanaian Cities Towns and Villages www.ghanaquest.com
- Jasikan District on GhanaDistricts.com
- Google maps
