= Solomon Osei-Akoto =

Ghanaian politician (1930–2015)

Hon. Solomon Osei-Akoto

MP for Birim-Abirem
- In office 1969–1972

Ministerial Secretary for Transport and Communication
- In office 1969 – 13 January 1972
- Prime Minister: Kofi Abrefa Busia
- Minister: Haruna Esseku; Jatoe Kaleo

Personal details
- Born: 3 June 1930 Akoasi, Eastern Region Gold Coast (now Ghana)
- Died: July 2015 (aged 85)
- Party: Progress Party
- Education: Kentucky State College; University of Pennsylvania
- Occupation: Politician
- Profession: Teacher, Business personnel

Solomon Osei-Akoto (3 June 1930 – July 2015) was a Ghanaian politician. He was member of parliament for Birim-Abirem from 1969 to 1972 and also served as ministerial secretary (deputy minister) for transport and communication under the Busia regime.

== Early life and education ==
Osei-Akoto was born on 3 June 1930 at Akoasi in the Eastern Region of Ghana.

Osei-Akoto had his early education at Nsawam primary and middle school from 1938 to 1947. He received his teachers' certificate A in 1951 from the Akropong Presbyterian Training College. He continued at Sadler Baptist Secondary School from 1957 to 1961 for his G. C. E. Ordinary and Advanced level certificates. He left for the United States of America in 1961 to study business administration at the Kentucky State College, Frankfort, Kentucky and received his bachelor's degree in 1964. He had further studies in business administration at the Wharton School of the University of Pennsylvania in Philadelphia where he was awarded his master of business administration degree in Industrial Management.

== Career ==
His teaching career begun 1952 after obtaining his teachers' certificate. He taught at Pekyi-Ashanti Presby middle school until 1956 when he obtained admission to study at the Sadler Baptist Secondary School. In 1967, he gained employment at the State Pharmaceutical Corporation in Accra as its personnel manager. A year later he was elected as the first president of the Association of Business Graduates. He also worked as an Administrative Officer with the Institute of Aquatic Biology, Council for Scientific and Industrial Research.

== Politics ==
Osei-Akoto was elected as a member of parliament representing the Birim-Abirem constituency on 29 August 1969. That same year he was appointed ministerial secretary(deputy minister) for transport and communications. He served in that capacity together with Joseph Yaw Manu until 1972 when the Busia government was overthrown.

== Personal life and death ==
Osei-Akoto married Janet Osei-Akoto in January 1952. Together they had six children. His hobbies included football, hockey, swimming and debates. He was a Christian. Solomon Osei-Akoto died in July 2015, at the age of 85.

== See also ==
- List of MPs elected in the 1969 Ghanaian parliamentary election
- Busia government
