= Stephen Krakue =

Ghanaian politician (1930–2004)

Member of parliament for Wassa West Constituency
- In office 1969–1972
- President: Edward Akufo-Addo
- Prime Minister: Kofi Abrefa Busia

Personal details
- Born: Stephen Krakue; August 1930 Gold Coast
- Died: 17 May 2004 (aged 73)
- Education: Brooklyn Technical College, College of Advanced Technology

Stephen Krakue (August 1930 – 17 May 2004) was a senior quantity surveyor and politician. He was in the second republic as the deputy minister for Trade, Industries and Tourism.

He was an associate member of the Institute of Quantity Surveyors (A. I. Q. S) and an associate member of the Institute of Architects and Surveyors (A. I. A. S).

== Early life and education ==
Krakue was born at Mpohor in the Western Region in August 1930.

He studied at the Anglican Mission School in Sekondi and proceeded to the United Kingdom to study at Brooklyn Technical College and the College of Advanced Technology which were both in Birmingham. He continued at the Brixton School of Building in London graduating in 1958.

== Career and politics ==
He worked as a store keeper in Tarkwa and at the department of Customs and Excise of the Customs Excise and Preventive Service (CEPS) in Takoradi. Prior to entering politics in 1969 he was the senior quantity surveyor for the Ghana Housing Corporation.

His political career begun when he joined the Wassa Youth Association (WYA). He served as the general secretary of the association and vice-chairman of the Fiase/Mpohor Local Council from 1955 to 1958.

In 1969 when the second republic was ushered in, he contested for the Wassa West seat on the ticket of the Progress Party and won. That same year, he was appointed deputy minister for Trade, Industries and Tourism. He served in this position together with Akenten Appiah-Menka in the first two years. He served in this capacity until 1972 when the Busia government was overthrown. After the coup, he and other members of the party detained without charge or trial for fifteen months by the then military government. Following the coup, a ban was placed on all political activities and due to his imprisonment, he was not eligible to participate in political activities however in 1979, prior to the lifting of the ban on political activities, he and other members of the Progress Party were cleared by a review tribunal to make him eligible to participate in political activities.

In 1992 when the Justice Annan committee revealed that the nation was ready for multiparty politics B. J. Da Rocha and other members of the defunct progress party frequently met at the house of Krakue with the intention to revive the Busia-Danquah-Dombo tradition of the Progress Party. It is believed that these meetings resulted in the founding of the National Patriotic Party in 1992. He is also known to have introduced Peter Mac Manu a former chairman of the National Patriotic Party to politics. He helped him partner with Mr. Agyenim-Boateng a former secretary of the party to win back Busia-Danquah-Dombo loyalists in the Western Region. He also invited him for the party's meetings at his residence prior to the 1992 elections.

== Personal life ==
He married Miss Sarah de Heer in 1965 in London. Together, they had seven children. His hobbies included; lawn tennis and reading.

== Death ==
He died on 17 May 2004 in London. He was laid in state on Friday, 30 July 2004 and buried the next day at Ayiem; his hometown. A thanksgiving service was held on 1 August at the Mpohor Methodist Church.

== See also ==
- List of MPs elected in the 1969 Ghanaian parliamentary election
- Busia government
