= Ameyaw =

Ameyaw is a surname or given name of Akan origin. Notable people with the surname or given name include:

== Given name ==
- Akumfi Ameyaw Munufie, Ghanaian politician and lawyer
- Ameyaw Debrah, Ghanaian celebrity blogger

== Surname ==
- Michael Ameyaw (born 2000), Polish footballer
