= Sakafia Islamic Senior High School =

Public school in Ayigya, Ashanti Region, Ghana

Coordinates: 6.6958°N 1.5720°W

- Ayigya, Ashanti Region; Ghana

Information
- Type: secondary/high school
- Religious affiliation: Islam
- Established: 2003 (23 years ago)
- School district: Asokore Mampong Municipal District
- Grades: Forms [1-3]
- Nickname: SAKISCO

Sakafia Islamic Senior High School (also known as Sakafiya Islamic SHS or SAKISCO) is a mixed second-cycle institution located in Ayigya in the Asokore Mampong Municipal District in the Ashanti Region of Ghana. In January 2025, the school's aquaponics initiative won the Zayed Sustainability Prize Global High Schools Award.

== History ==
The school was established in 2003. As at 2025, Mohamed Shahid is the Principal and Headmaster of the school.

In 2024, the school lost the 2023/24 Ashanti Region Inter-School and College Soccer (Boys) Competition to Kumasi Anglican Senior High School.

== Awards and recognition ==
In 2019, the Ministry of Education distributed bunk beds, mattresses and chairs to the Sakafia School and other second cycle institutions in Ghana.

In March 2022, the school benefited from the Zongo Development Fund. In October 2022, the school participated in the National Science and Maths Quiz.

In 2024, the school participated again in the National Science and Maths Quiz.

In 2025, the school's aquaponics project which was designed to check food insecurity was awarded the 2025 Zayed Sustainability Prize in the Global High Schools – Sub-Saharan Africa category. Prior to the school receiving the award, the school competed with St Kizito High School from Namugongo, Uganda; and Mpesa Foundation Academy from Kenya.
