= Jasikan College of Education =

Teachers training college in Ghana

- Collège d'éducation Jasikan
- Motto: Sapere Aude
- Motto in English: Dare to be Wise
- Established: 21 January 1952
- Affiliations: Government of Ghana
- Location: Jasikan-Buem, Jasikan District, VJ0005, Ghana; 7.4125°N 0.4631°E
- Language: Lelemi, French and English
- Region Zone: Oti Region; Volta Zone
- Short name: JASICO
- Colors: maroon
- Source: An Atlas of The Forty Colleges of Education in Ghana.

Jasikan College of Education is a teacher education college in Jasikan-Buem (Jasikan District, Oti Region, Ghana). The college is located in Volta Zone zone. It is one of the about 40 public colleges of education in Ghana. The college participated in the DFID-funded T-TEL programme.

== History ==
Jasikan College of Education was first established at Peki Blengo as a Body Cooperate college (BODYCO) on 21st January, 1952 with the motto "Sapere Aude" which means "Dare to be Wise". Thirty male students were enrolled at its inception. The pioneer staff included Rev. Eugene Garu, a German American missionary, Ag. Principal, Messrs H.B.K. Ogbete and P.K. Kpeto.

The college moved to Jasikan in December 1952. Nana Osei Brantuo III released land for its development. The college started with a 2-year Teacher's Certificate ‘B’ Post Middle programme in 1952. The programme was upgraded to 4-year Teacher's Certificate ‘A’ Post Middle/2-year Post ‘B’. The 2-year Teacher's Certificate ‘A’ Post Secondary was introduced into the college in 1974. In 1975, it admitted the first batch of 3-year Post Secondary students. Between 1985 and 1991, the college run the Modular programme. The Diploma in Basic Education programme was introduced in October 2004 for regular students; in 2005 for untrained teachers and in 2006 for Certificate ‘A’ teachers on sandwich basis.

List of principals since the establishment of the college:
Name	Years served
Mr. F.D. Harker	1952 – 1962
Mr. G. Hosu-Porley	1962 – 1964
Mr. W.K. Agbenyega	1964 – 1976
Mr. A.A. Jaisey	1976 – 1982
Mr. T.K. Adams	1982 – 1990
Mr. C.K. Demuyakor	1990 – 1991
Rev. R.K. Abenney	1991 - 1996
Rev. Fr. J.K. Danso	1996 - 2002
Mr. G.F.K. Wotordzor	2002
