= Henry Ford Kamel =

Ghanaian banker and politician

Member of the Ghana Parliament for Buem
- In office January 2005 – December 2012
- Preceded by: Emil Kwadzo Brantuo
- Succeeded by: Daniel Kwesi Ashiamah
- Majority: 13,627 (52.8)

Volta Regional Minister
- In office 26 March 2012 – 25 December 2012
- President: John Atta Mills
- Preceded by: Joseph Amenowode

Deputy Minister for Lands and Forestry
- In office ? – March 2012
- President: John Atta Mills

Personal details
- Born: 21 December 1961 Ghana
- Died: 25 December 2012 (aged 51) Guaman, Ghana
- Party: National Democratic Congress
- Spouse: Helen Kamel
- Profession: Banker, politician
- Committees: Special Budget Committee; Works and Housing

Henry Ford Kofi Kamel (21 December 1961 – 25 December 2012) was a Ghanaian banker and politician. He was the Member of Parliament for the Buem constituency from January 2005 and also the Volta Region Minister from March 2012 until his death on 25 December 2012.

== Early life and education ==
Kamel hails from Guanam, a place in the Volta Region of Ghana. He was born on 21 December 1961. He attended Ho Technical University.

== Career ==
Kamel trained as a banker and economist by profession. He worked as the managing director of the North Volta Rural Bank Limited.

== Parliament ==
Kamel was a member of the National Democratic Congress. He won his last election on 7 December 2012 by a majority of 13,627. He first won the seat in the 2004 election replacing Emil Kwadzo Brantuo as the MP in the 4th Parliament of the 4th Republic with a majority of 10,488. He successfully defended his seat in the 2008 Ghanaian general election. He won 65.8% of the vote.

== Government ==
In March 2012, President John Atta Mills appointed Henry Kamel as the new Volta Regional Minister, replacing Joseph Amenowode. He stayed in this post until his death on Christmas Day in 2012. Prior to this appointment, he was the Deputy Minister for Lands and Forestry.

One of his notable achievements was bringing peace to the Gbi Traditional Area between the indigenes of Hohoe and the Zongo Community. The Paramount chief of the Gbi Traditional Area, Togbega Gabusu VI, paid tribute to those peace efforts.

== Death ==
Kamel was reported to have returned to his home town, Guaman in the Jasikan District of the Volta Region on 25 December 2012. While chatting with some family and friends the next day, he suddenly collapsed. He died before arrival at the Jasikan Government Hospital. He was 51.

== Personal life ==
He was married with three children. He was a Christian and a Catholic.

His daughter launched the Kamel for Hope foundation in his honor to reach out to deprived persons in Ghana. The foundation was founded on 1 May 2013.

== See also ==
- List of Mills government ministers
- List of Mahama government ministers
- National Democratic Congress
- Buem constituency

Parliament of Ghana
Preceded by Emil Kwadzo Brantuo	Member of Parliament for Buem; 2005 – 2012	Succeeded by Daniel Kwesi Ashiamah
Political offices
Preceded by Joseph Amenowode	Volta Regional Minister; 2012	Succeeded by Helen Ntoso
