= Alexander Abu Abedi =

Ghanaian politician (born 1930)

Hon. Dr. Alexander Abu Abedi

Member of the Ghana Parliament for Akropong
- In office 1969–1972
- President: Edward Akufo-Addo

Personal details
- Born: 7 January 1930 Akropong, Eastern Region, Gold Coast
- Education: Abetifi Presbyterian College of Education

Alexander Abu Abedi (born 7 January 1930) is a Ghanaian politician who was a member of the first parliament of the second Republic of Ghana. He represented the Akropong constituency under the membership of the Progress Party.

== Early life and education ==
Alexander Abu Abedi was born on 7 January 1930 in the Eastern region of Ghana. He attended Abetifi Presbyterian College of Education, Abetifi-Kwahu formerly Abetifi Presbyterian Boys' Boarding School where he obtained his Teachers' Training Certificate. He worked as an advertiser before going into parliament.

== Politics ==
Abedi began his political career in 1969 when he became the parliamentary candidate for the Progress Party (PP) to represent Akropong constituency prior to the commencement of the 1969 Ghanaian parliamentary election. He assumed office as a member of the first parliament of the second Republic of Ghana on 1 October 1969 after being pronounced winner at the 1969 Ghanaian parliamentary election and was later suspended following the overthrow of the Busia government on 13 January 1972.

== Personal life ==
Abedi is a Christian.
