= University of Skills Training and Entrepreneurial Development =

Public university in Kumasi, Ashanti, Ghana

- Type: Public
- Established: 2020; 6 years ago
- Vice-Chancellor: Prof. Frederick Kwaku Sarfo
- Location: Kumasi, Ghana; 6.6969°N 1.6813°W
- Campus: Urban

The University of Skills Training and Entrepreneurial Development (USTED), originally known as Akenten Appiah-Menka University of Skills Training and Entrepreneurial Development (AAMUSTED), is a public university located in Kumasi, Ashanti Region, Ghana. The university was established in 2020 to champion the course of higher technical, vocational and entrepreneurial education in the country.

== History ==
On August 27, 2020, the technical college in Kumasi and another in Asante- Mampong were combined to form this new university. The name honours Mr. Akenten Appiah-Menka a Ghanaian, Lawyer, Politician and Businessman. Prof. Frederick Kwaku Sarfo is the first and current Vice-Chancellor of the University. Per Act 1162 (2025), the name of the University has, since December 24, 2025, changed from Akenten Appiah-Menka University of Skills Training and Entrepreneurial Development (AAMUSTED) to University of Skills Training and Entrepreneurial Development, Kumasi (USTED).

== Campuses ==
=== Kumasi Campus ===
The Kumasi campus, which is located in Tanoso, is the main campus of the university. This campus alone houses 5 faculties with 12 Departments of the University.

=== Mampong Campus ===
The Asante-Mampong campus is located in Asante-Mampong, which is the capital of the Mampong Municipal Assembly. The campus houses 4 faculties and 11 departments.

== Academic ==
=== Faculties - Kumasi ===
- Faculty of Applied Science and Mathematics Education
- Faculty of Business Education
- Faculty of Technical Education
- Faculty of Engineering and Technology
- Faculty of Education and Communication Science
- Faculty of Vocational Education

=== Faculties - Mampong ===
- Faculty of Agriculture Science Education
- Faculty of Science Education
- Faculty of Environmental and Health Education
- Faculty of Education and General studies.
