= Kofi Adams =

Ghanaian politician

Hon. Kofi Adams
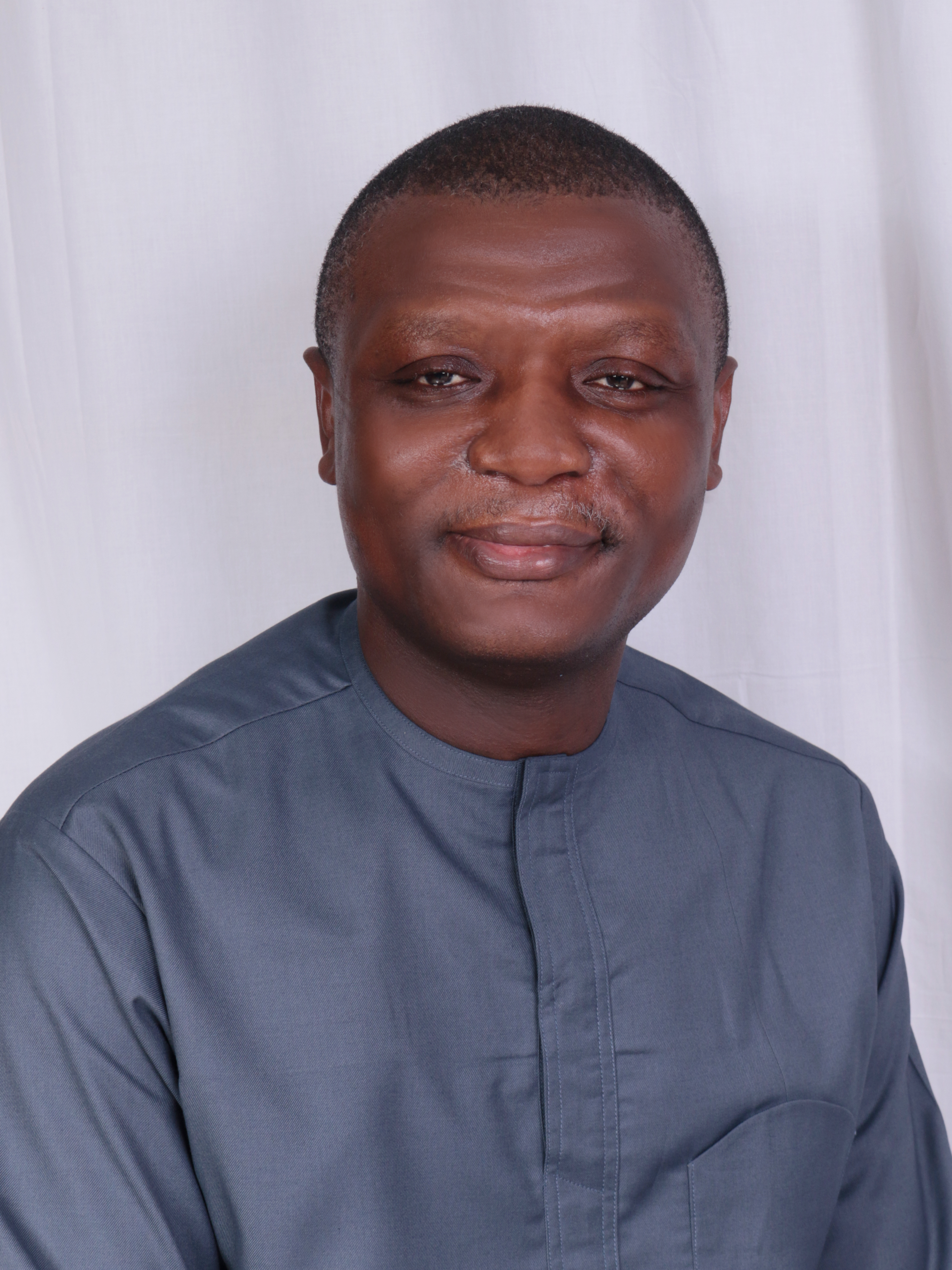

Member of Parliament for Buem Constituency
- Incumbent
- Assumed office 7 January 2021
- Preceded by: Daniel Kwesi Ashiamah

Personal details
- Party: National Democratic Congress

Kofi Iddie Adams (born 2 May 1975) is a Ghanaian politician who is a member of the National Democratic Congress. He was elected a member of Parliament for the Buem Constituency in the Oti region in 2020, and re-elected for the same constituency in 2024. He is a former National Organizer for the National Democratic Congress.

== Early life and education ==
Kofi Iddie Adams was born on 2 May 1975. He comes from Teteman, a town in the Jasikan District in the Oti Region of Ghana. He holds a Bachelor of Science degree in Zoology with emphasis on Epidemiology of Parasitic Diseases from the University of Ghana in 2001.

== Career ==
Adams served as a tutor at Adisadel College. He later served as the Spokesperson And Director Of Public Affairs for Flt Lt. Jerry John Rawlings (Rtd), a former President Of Ghana.

=== Minister for Sports and Recreation ===
In February 2026, while serving as Ghana’s Minister for Sports and Recreation, Kofi Adams pledged to donate two months of his ministerial salary to the Ghana Sports Fund, a newly established financial mechanism intended to support sports development, infrastructure, and athlete welfare nationwide. He made the pledge during a parliamentary session, emphasising that leadership commitment was necessary to encourage broader investment in the sector and bolster the Fund’s impact on Ghana’s sporting ecosystem and potential contribution to the economy. As part of his appeal, Adams also called on other lawmakers and government officials to contribute towards the Fund’s objectives.

== Politics ==
Adams has served as deputy General Secretary in the past for the National Democratic Congress. In December 2014, he was elected as National Organizer for the party in the National Executive elections. In the run off to the 2016 elections, he was selected as the campaign coordinator of the NDC's 15-member national campaign team, along with others such Joyce Bawah Mogtari, Felix Kwakye Ofosu, Daniel Ohene Agyekum, Dan Abodakpi, Samuel Ofosu-Ampofo all serving as members and Johnson Asiedu Nketia as chairman.

=== Parliamentary bids ===
Adams won the parliamentary bid to represent the National Democratic Congress for the Buem Constituency ahead of the 2020 elections. Adams secured 388 votes to unseat incumbent member of parliament Daniel Kosi Ashaimah who polled 280 votes. The others Ibrahim Adams Muniru and Daniel Adeapena polled 95 and nine votes respectively.

In December 2020, Adams won the Buem Constituency, by getting 18,528 votes representing 71.84% against his closest contender Lawrence Kwami Aziale of the New Patriotic Party who had 6,843 votes representing 26.5%.

In the December 2024 elections Adams stood again, and won the constituency with 17,510 votes (78.3%), versus the 4,852 votes (21.7%) of his New Patriotic Party opponent, Richard Kwadwo Adjei.

=== Member of parliament ===
During his first term as MP Adams served as a member on the Public Accounts Committee and the Defence and Interior Committee of Parliament.

Adams was formally sworn in as Ghana's Minister for Sports and Recreation on 7 February 2025.

== Personal life ==
Adams is a Christian.
