= Konadu =

Konadu is a surname. Notable people with the surname include:

- Alex Konadu (1948—2011), Ghanaian guitarist
- Asare Konadu (1932–1994), Ghanaian journalist, novelist and publisher
- Maa Afia Konadu (1950–2019), Ghanaian media personality
- Maxwell Konadu (born 1972), Ghanaian footballer and manager
- Nana Konadu (born 1964 as Nana Yaw Konadu Yeboah), Ghanaian boxer of the 1980s, '90s and 2000s
- Nana Konadu Agyeman (born 1948), the First Lady of Ghana
- Yaw Konadu (born 1926), Ghanaian politician
- Don-Angelo Konadu (born 2006), Dutch footballer
