= Kumasi Academy =

Location
- Asokore-Mampong; Ashanti Region; Kumasi, P. O. Box 3814; Ghana
- Coordinates: 6.7084°N 1.5710°W

Information
- Other name: KUMACA
- Former names: Sadler Baptist College (1956-1960)
- School type: Public high school
- Denomination: Baptist
- Established: 1957
- Authority: Ghana Education Service
- School code: 050105
- Gender: Mixed
- Age range: 14–19
- Language: English
- Houses: Prempeh, Sadler, Boakye Dankwa (Bodank), Yaa Achiaa, Akua Nyarko, Jubilee, Nana Boakye Ansah Debrah (NABOAD)
- Colors: Blue and gold
- Sports: Football, basketball, handball, volleyball, track and field
- Nickname: Akunini
- Website: http://kumasiacademy.com/

Kumasi Academy, also known as KUMACA, is a category B public, senior high school located in Asokore-Mampong, in the Ashanti Region of Ghana. Asokore-Mampong is the capital of the Asokore Mampong Municipal Assembly and about 8 kilometres (5.0 mi) from the central business district of Kumasi off the Kumasi Airport-Aboabo Road.

== History ==
The academy was founded in 1956 by the Ghana Baptist Convention as Sadler Baptist College. In 1960, the seminary was moved from Asokore-Mampong to Abuakwa, leaving the secondary school at its present location, Asokore-Mampong. Poe was later succeeded by Madam Nadine Lovan, another white missionary, as the head of the Sadler Baptist School. The school has since become one of the most popular schools in Ghana because of the Baptist missionaries' strict adherence to discipline.

Later, the then government wanted to have a say in the administration and running of the school. The Baptist Mission was not the type that would take kindly to that policy and was not prepared to acquiesce in this interference since it believed in the complete separation between religion and government. In these circumstances, the mission found it more expedient to leave the scene and handed over the school to the government on two conditions; that the name "Sadler Baptist" be changed and that the teaching of religion in the school should be in the hands of the Baptist Mission. The government accepted this offer, and "Sadler Baptist Secondary School" was eventually phased out.

On 9 July 2022, the ultramodern Akunini Science Laboratory was commissioned in the school to enhance STEM education. It is a legacy project that was fully funded by the alumni association known as Akunini Global.

== Curriculum and Halls of residence ==
Kumasi Academy is one of the top senior high schools in Ghana, noted for its excellent performances in both internal and external examinations. It is also noted for nurturing and producing academicians who occupy important positions in Ghana and abroad.

== Notable alumni ==
- Amerley Ollennu Awua-Asamoa – Ghana's former Ambassador to Denmark
- Kwame Bawuah-Edusei – physician, entrepreneur and former diplomat
- Dan Botwe MP – Okere Constituency
- Alan John Kyerematen –Former Minister of Trade & Industry
- Peter Mac Manu – former chairman of NPP
- Solomon Osei-Akoto – deputy minister in the Second Republic

== See also ==
- List of senior secondary schools in Ghana
