= T. D. Brodie-Mends =

Ghanaian politician (1929–2013)

Member of the Ghana Parliament for Cape Coast
- In office 1969–1972
- Preceded by: Kojo Abraham
- Succeeded by: Dr. Bassa Quansah

Minister of Information
- In office 1 October 1969 – 27 January 1971
- President: Kofi Abrefa Busia

Minister for Lands and Mineral Resources
- In office 27 January 1971 – 12 January 1972
- President: Kofi Abrefa Busia
- Preceded by: R. R. Amponsah

Personal details
- Born: 26 November 1929 Sekondi, Gold Coast
- Died: 19 January 2013 (aged 83) Accra, Ghana
- Education: Aggrey Memorial A.M.E. Zion Senior High School, Mfantsipim School, University of London

Theophilus Dougan Brodie-Mends (26 November 1929 – 19 January 2013) was a Ghanaian journalist, lawyer and politician. He was a member of the first Parliament of the second Republic. He also served as Minister of Information and Minister of Lands and Mineral Resources and also Minister of State during the Busia government.

== Early life and education ==
Brodie-Mends was born on 26 November 1929 at Sekondi in the Western Region, Ghana.

His early education began in 1934 at the Catholic Primary School in Sekondi. He enrolled at Aggrey Memorial College, Cape Coast in 1940 but left in 1941 and joined Mfantsipim School, Cape Coast in 1942 to continue his secondary education. He proceeded to England in 1952 to study politics at the Marx School, London, where he passed the General Certificate of Education (Advanced Level) in 1954. He went on to study law at the University of London later that year and joined the Middle Temple in 1957. He was called to the bar in 1960. While in Britain he was a Labour Party activist, the President of the Ghana Students' Union of Great Britain and Ireland, and vice-president of the West African Students' Union.

== Career ==
Brodie-Mends worked as journalist, as a sub-editor for the Star of West Africa from 1947 to 1952.

He served as a member of the board of the board of governors of Mfantsipim School and Mfantsiman Girls' Secondary School. He also served as a board member of the Ghana College of Sports (COS) in 1966 and the New Times Ltd. He was a member of the Central Regional Development Committee, member of the Constituent Assembly, and counsel for the University College, Cape Coast. He was chairman of the Management Committee of the Cape Coast Municipal Council.

== Politics ==
In 1969, Brodie-Mends was elected as a member of parliament for Cape Coast on the ticket of the Progress Party. He was appointed Minister of Information in 1969 and Minister of Lands and Mineral Resources in January 1971 until January 1972 when the Busia government was overthrown.

The overthrow of the Busia government led to his arrest; he was incarcerated for 13 months. He became a founding member of the Movement for Freedom and Justice, which opposed SMC and its UNIGOV concept, for which he was incarcerated for three months. When Ghana was ushered into civilian rule in 1979 he became a founding member of the Popular Front Party and ran in the 1979 elections, but lost to a representative of the Action Congress Party.

During the fourth republic, Brodie-Mends was a founding member of the New Patriotic Party.

== Chieftaincy ==
He was made a divisional chief in his hometown Elmina.

== Personal life ==
Brodie-Mends enjoyed reading and writing. He was a keen football enthusiast who supported the Cape Coast Venomous Vipers. He was an enthusiast of lawn tennis. He also enjoyed playing draughts with the fishermen in Idan Guam, a fishing village in the Central Region. He was a Christian.

== Death ==
Brodie-Mends died after a short illness on 19 January 2013 in Accra.

== See also ==
- Busia government
- Minister for Information (Ghana)
- MPs elected in the Ghanaian parliamentary election, 1969
