= Eric Kwame Heymann =

Ghanaian journalist and politician (1928–1987)

Member of the Ghana Parliament for Buem
- In office 1965–1966
- Preceded by: Francis Yao Asare
- Succeeded by: Christopher Kwaku Nyano

Personal details
- Born: Eric Kwame Heymann; 29 March 1928 Dzelukope near Keta, Volta Region, Gold Coast
- Died: 2 June 1987 (aged 59)
- Party: Convention People's Party
- Education: Accra Academy
- Occupation: Politician
- Profession: Journalist

Eric Kwame Heymann (29 March 1928 – 2 June 1987) was a Ghanaian journalist and politician. He was the first Editor-in-chief of the Accra Evening News. He also served as the Chairman of the Association of Ghana Journalists and Writers. From 1965 to 1966, he was the member of parliament for the Buem constituency.

== Early life and education ==
Heymann was born at Dzelukope near Keta on 29 March 1928 to Edmund Kofi Heymann of the Government Transport Department and Mrs. Dina Afiwa Heymann who hailed from Keta.

He completed his early education in 1943 and continued at the Accra Academy from 1944 to 1947. He began his sixth form education at the Washington Carver Institute in Accra but his education was interrupted due to the political disturbances in 1948. He became the Assistant Secretary of the Club of Ghana Patriots, and later in 1948 he had some training in the rudiments of journalism while he worked on the Gold Coast Express at Convention Hall in Accra.

== Career ==
Heymann begun making freelance contributions to the Accra Evening News from 3 September 1948, at the time he received no salary. In that same year, he worked with the Gold Coast Express as a staff reporter. There, he rose through the ranks to become a senior reporter and later sub-editor between the latter period of 1948 and 1949. During the aforementioned period, Heymann was the editor for a secret paper known as the Freedom Defence Society Link. He became editor of the Gold Coast Express in 1950 and engaged with the Daily Graphic that same year as sub-Editor, Rewrite Editor and acting Night Editor. After his training with the Daily Graphic, he was employed by Ausco Press Limited to submit what he called "professional information leading to the establishment of Newspapers".

In 1952 Heymann together with one Lawrence Fumadoh edited and published a newspaper that was registered at the Post Office called The People. He joined the "Accra Evening News" (which had then been changed to the Ghana Evening News and later the Evening News due to libel suits which were frequently lodged against the paper) in March 1952 and in July that year, he became the Editor of the newspaper. In 1957 Heymann joined a weekly newspaper called The African Masses where he did a publication with Mr. E. C. Quaye. During the latter period of 1957, Heymann was engaged with the Guinea Press. He worked as the Editor of their newspaper The Ghana Star and in March 1958 he rejoined the Evening News as an Editor. In 1963 Heymann became Chairman of the Association of Ghana Journalists and Writers. Heymann worked with the Guinea Press until 24 February 1966 when the Nkrumah government was overthrown. He also worked with other publishing houses namely; Star Publishing Company Limited, Ghana News Agency and Napado.

== Politics ==
Heymann was a member of the Convention People's Party (CPP) and believed in Nkrumah's socialism. He entered parliament in 1965 to represent the Buem constituency on the ticket of the CPP. He replaced Francis Yao Asare who had been sentenced that same year to twenty-one years imprisonment on charges of defrauding the government an amount of over £1 million. He remained in parliament until the overthrow of the Nkrumah government in 1966. Following the overthrow of Kwame Nkrumah, he was imprisoned by the National Liberation Council (NLC) for more than two years without trial. During the third republic he joined the People's National Party (PNP), an offspring of the CPP.

== Personal life and death ==
Heymann married Miss. Mercy Sewornu in 1951 but the marriage was dissolved in 1956. He later married Miss. Aureola Sawyerr in early 1957. He had eleven children between the two marriages. He died on 2 June 1987, at the age of 59.

== Book ==
Heymann, Eric (1977). One Road Ahead!: The Last Days of Nkrumah : the Men He Left Behind. Africa Bureau of Biographies & Historical Research.

== See also ==
- List of MPs elected in the 1965 Ghanaian parliamentary election
- Buem
