= Kwame Bawuah-Edusei =

Ghanaian diplomat (born 1955)

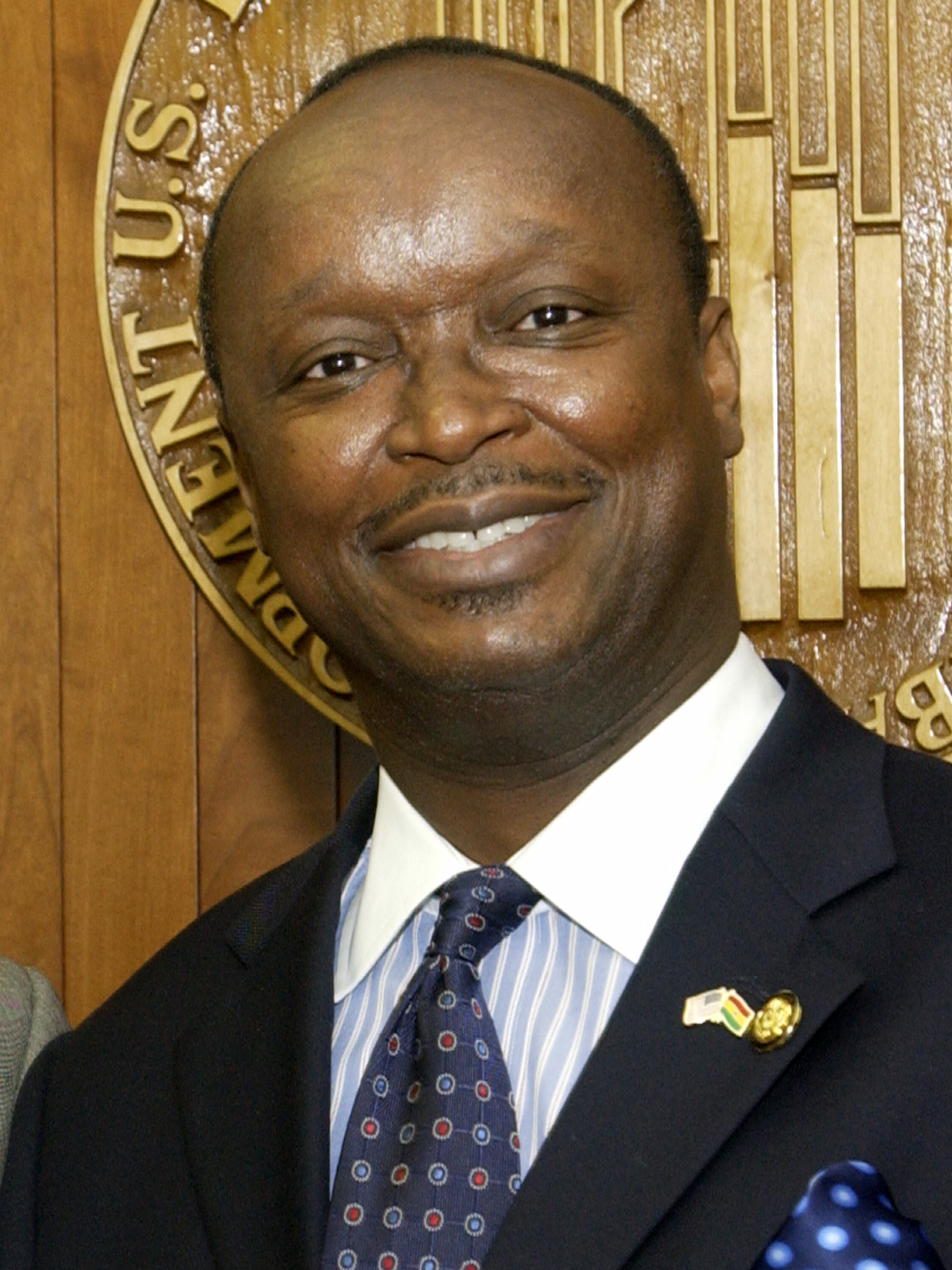
- Bawuah-Edusei in 2007

Ghana ambassador to Switzerland
- In office 2004–2006
- Appointed by: John Kufuor
- Preceded by: Fritz Kwabena Poku
- Succeeded by: Kwabena Baah-Duodu

Ghana Ambassador to the United States of America
- In office 5 September 2006 – 7 December 2009
- Appointed by: John Kufuor
- Preceded by: Fritz Kwabena Poku
- Succeeded by: Daniel Ohene Agyekum

Personal details
- Born: 10 June 1955 Ghana
- Education: Kumasi Academy
- Alma mater: Kwame Nkrumah University of Science and Technology; Howard University
- Occupation: diplomat; entrepreneur
- Profession: Physician

Kwame Bawuah-Edusei (born 10 June 1955) is a Ghanaian physician, entrepreneur and diplomat. He served as Ghana's ambassador to Switzerland from 2004 to 2006, and Ghana's Ambassador to the United States of America from 2006 to 2009.

== Early life and education ==
Bawuah-Edusei was born 10 June 1955. He had his secondary education at Kumasi Academy, and proceeded to the Kwame Nkrumah University of Science and Technology where he studied Human Biology. He later entered the Howard University Hospital where he had his medical residency in family medicine.

== Career ==
Bawuah-Edusei worked as a medical practitioner and an entrepreneur prior to his ambassadorial appointment. He was the head of Educe Medical Center, a hospital he founded in Alexandria, Virginia. He founded the Educe Capital LLC, a firm that focused on bio-medicine, real estate, and agro processing, and also founded the EO Group with his business partner George Yaw Owusu. In 2004, Bawuah-Edusei was appointed Ghana's ambassador to Switzerland. He served in this capacity until 2006 when he was appointed Ghana's Ambassador to the United States of America. He held this office until 2009.

== Personal life ==
Bawuah-Edusei is married to Evangeline Bawuah-Edusei.

== Book ==
Thrived Despite the Odds, 2019

== See also ==
- Embassy of Ghana in Washington, D.C.
