= Kwame Asante =

Ghanaian soldier and politician

Commissioner for Transport
- In office 1973–1974
- President: Colonel I. K. Acheampong
- Preceded by: Lt. Colonel Anthony Selormey
- Succeeded by: Colonel P. K. Agyekum

Commissioner for Labour, Social welfare and Cooperatives
- In office 1972–1973
- President: Colonel I. K. Acheampong
- Preceded by: William Godson Bruce-Konuah
- Succeeded by: Major Kwame Agbo

Personal details
- Died: 3 April 1990
- Citizenship: Ghanaian

Military service
- Allegiance: Ghana Armed Forces
- Branch/service: Ghana Army
- Rank: Major

Kwame Asante is a Ghanaian soldier and politician. He served in the National Redemption Council military government until his resignation in 1974.

Following the coup d'état on 13 January 1972, he was appointed the Commissioner for Labour, Social welfare and Cooperatives led by Colonel Acheampong. In 1973, he was transferred to the Ministry of Transport which he headed until April 1974 when he resigned from government.

Asante was one of several people whose assets were returned to them during the Kufuor government era. These assets had been seized during the purge by the Armed Forces Revolutionary Council military government led by Flight Lt. Jerry Rawlings when it ruled Ghana for four months in 1979.

Asante had three children with his wife Leticia. He had four additional children with three other women. He died intestate on 3 April 1990 following a road traffic collision.

== See also ==
- National Redemption Council

Political offices
Preceded by Lt. Col. Selormey	Commissioner for Transport; 1973 – 1974	Succeeded by Colonel P. K. Agyekum
Preceded by William Godson Bruce-Konuah	Commissioner for Labour, Social welfare and Cooperatives; 1972 – 1973	Succeeded by Major Kwame Agbo
