= Joseph Yaw Manu =

Ghanaian politician (1922–??)

Deputy Minister for Transport and Communications
- In office 1969–1972
- President: Edward Akufo-Addo
- Prime Minister: Kofi Abrefa Busia

Member of the Ghana Parliament for Mampong South
- In office 1 October 1969 – 13 January 1972
- Preceded by: Constituency merged
- Succeeded by: Kwadwo Mpiani

Personal details
- Born: 21 July 1922 (age 104) Nsuta, Ashanti Region Gold Coast (now Ghana)
- Party: Progress Party
- Education: Adisadel College, Cape Coast
- Occupation: Politician
- Profession: Civil Servant

Joseph Yaw Manu was a Ghanaian civil servant and politician of the First Parliament of the Second Republic representing the Mampong South Constituency in the Ashanti Region of Ghana. He was a deputy minister for transport during the second republic.

== Early life and education ==
Joseph was born on 21 August 1922 at Nsuta in the Ashanti Region of Ghana. He was a former pupil of Adisadel College, Cape Coast.

== Career and politics ==
Joseph joined the government civil service after his secondary education. He worked as a civil servant until 1955 when he resigned to work for the United Africa Company Limited as a store manager at Nandom in the Upper Region (now in the Upper West Region) of Ghana.

=== 1963 Treason Trial ===
In 1959 while at Nandom he was alleged have assisted Dr. Kofi Abrefa Busia (who was then a member of the opposition and later became Prime Minister of Ghana in the second republic) to leave Ghana to Bobogyiraso in Burkina Faso (Upper Volta) via the Ghana border in the Upper West Region. In January, 1960, he returned to Kumasi to renew his contract with the United Africa Company Limited to work in Kumasi as a store manager. As a member of the United Party he fled to Abidjan in the Ivory Coast to seek asylum on January 7, 1961. According to him, members of his party were being arrested and detained so he fled for his life knowing the assistance he had offered Dr. Busia (who was a leader of the party) in Nandom. He was arrested on 7 November 1962 while at the Accra airport while on his way from the Ivory Coast unroute to Lome, Togo. He was accused of being a part of a plot that was hatched in Lome to assassinate Dr. Kwame Nkrumah. Joseph Yaw Manu was accused of making frequent trips to Togo while in exile at the Ivory Coast to attend meetings that were organised by the United Party. The allegation was that these meetings were organised to plan the overthrow of the then Nkrumah government and the assassination of the then president Dr. Kwame Nkrumah and that these plans were eventually executed in the form of the Kulungugu attack in the then Upper Region of Ghana on 1 August 1962 when a hand grenade was thrown at the president by a person or people who were believed to have been working for Emmanuel Obetsebi-Lamptey who was believed to have been the main brain behind the attack. He was found guilty and sentenced to death on charges of conspiracy to commit treason and treason. He was imprisoned in 1963 and was released in 1966 when the Nkrumah government was overthrown.

=== Second Republic ===
In 1969 he was elected to represent the Mampong South constituency in the second republic parliament on the ticket of the Progress Party. That same year he was appointed deputy minister (ministerial secretary) for transport and communications. He served in that capacity together with Solomon Osei-Akoto until 1972 when the Busia government was overthrown.

=== Fourth Republic ===
In 1992, during the Fourth Republic, he was a founding member of the NPP.

== See also ==
- List of MPs elected in the 1969 Ghanaian parliamentary election
- Busia government
