= Ayigya =

- Town
- Country: Ghana
- Time zone: UTC+0 (Casablanca)

Ayigya is a town in Ghana. It is 10 kilometres from the centre Kumasi. It is a dormitory town. There is a market in the community which serves both its inhabitants as well as students from the Kwame Nkrumah University of Science and Technology.

== Boundaries ==
The town is bordered on the north by Maxima, to the West by Bomso, to the east by Asokore Mampong and to the South by Kentinkrono.

== Education ==
The Sakafia Islamic Senior High School is located in the town.
