= Joseph Godson Amamoo =

Ghanaian journalist and politician (born 1933)

Member of the Ghana Parliament for Swedru-Nyakrom-Nkum
- In office 1969–1972
- Preceded by: Military government
- Succeeded by: Parliament dissolved

Personal details
- Born: 29 August 1933 (age 93)
- Citizenship: Ghana
- Education: University of Ghana; Achimota School
- Occupation: Lawyer

Joseph Godson Amamoo (born 29 August 1931) is a Ghanaian former journalist, academic, foreign service worker, and politician. He once served as editor for the Ghanaian Times, a lecturer, Ghana's ambassador to Hungary and also as a deputy minister for Health, and later deputy minister of Lands and Minerals Resource in the Second Republic.

== Early life and education ==
Joseph was born on 29 August 1931 at Swedru. He had his early education at Bekwai and Agona Swedru Methodist Schools completing in 1944. He won a scholarship to study at Achimota School from 1945 to 1950. He enrolled at the University of Ghana in 1952 on scholarship as well, obtaining his bachelor's degree in 1956. He studied law at the Middle Temple, London he was called to the bar in 1965.

== Career ==
Prior to entering the University of Ghana he took up a one-year teaching appointment at Prempeh College, Kumasi. He was assistant editor of the Government's Weekly Review in 1956. That same year, he joined the teaching staff of Adisadel College, Cape Coast and taught there until 1957. In 1958 he published a book in London entitled: The New Ghana. Following the success of the publication he gave up his earlier plan of becoming a doctor to pursue a different career path; journalism. He subsequently became the London correspondent of the Ghanaian Times that same year until 1960. In 1961 he entered the Ghanaian foreign service as a public relations adviser to the Ghana High Commission in London. He was appointed Ghana's first ambassador to Hungary and the International Atomic Energy Agency in Vienna, Austria in 1962 serving as one of the youngest ambassadors in the world. In 1965 he became a freelance writer and lecturer. He was made editor of the Ghanaian Times in 1967.

== Politics ==
Joseph joined the Progress Party on 1 June 1969 after serving as editor of the Ghanaian Times for two years. When the second republic was ushered in, he was elected to represent the Swedru-Nyakrom-Nkum constituency in parliament on the ticket of the Progress Party. He contested the seat against William Yaw Eduful of the National Alliance of Liberals, Alhaji Seidu Ben Alhassan of the People's Action Party, John Alex-Hamah of the United Nationalist Party and Edward Kobina Ferguson of the All People's Republican Party. That same year he was appointed the deputy minister for Health. He served together with Adam Amandi in this post until 1971. In 1971, he was appointed deputy minister of Lands and Minerals Resources. He served in this position until 1972 when the Busia government was overthrown by the Supreme Military Council (then the National Redemption Council). He and other officials were arrested and detained after the coup d'état by the then military government. He was released in 1973.

== Later life ==
Prior to his retirement, Joseph worked for the borough of Hackney for eleven years as the Race Equality Officer. He also taught at the Kennedy-King College, Chicago for five years. His public life ended in 2009 after serving as chairman of the state-owned diamond mine in Ghana since 2001. He has been a member of the Royal Society of Arts, London since 1964. He is also a former executive member of the Royal African Society, London. He has been invited by numerous universities and many adult audiences in the United Kingdom to lecture and give talks on Africa.

== Publications ==
Joseph's interests are in the field of African affairs. He has contributed to many African and British journals, and also authored books concerning Ghanaian and African affairs. Some of his works include;

- The New Ghana: the birth of a nation (Pan Books Ltd, London, 1958);
- Constitutional Proposals for Post-Coup Africa (Black and Company, London, 1967);
- The Ghanaian Revolution (Jafint Company, 1988);
- The ambassador: a novel (JAFINT, 2001);
- The Queen's Men (Xlibris Corporation, 7 March 2001);
- The African princess: a novel (JAFINT, 2003);
- Ghana: 50 Year of Independence (Xlibris Corporation LLC, 2011);
- God's Hand at Work (Xlibris Corporation, 2013);
- My African Journey (Xlibris Corporation LLC, 2014);
- Africa: Rich But Poor (Xlibris, 30 December 2015);
- Racism: a Global Problem (AuthorHouse UK, 30 April 2016).

== Personal life ==
Amamoo was married to an Irish woman; the late Breid Mary Amamoo (née Langan) who was made queen in Joseph's hometown Swedru. Together they had two daughters, who are both barristers by profession, and also five grandchildren. Breid Amamoo died on 11 January 2017, at the age of 87.

His interests included reading, walking, classical music, art galleries, museums, boxing, marriage and inter racial harmony.

== See also ==
- List of MPs elected in the 1969 Ghanaian parliamentary election
- Busia government
