= Daniel Ohene Agyekum =

Ghanaian diplomat

Amb. Daniel Ohene Agyekum
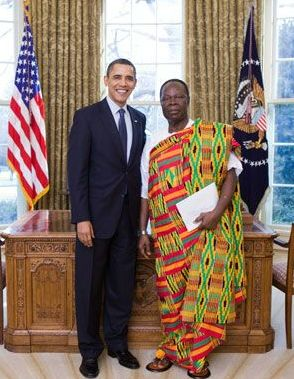
- Ohene Agyekum and Barack Obama at the White House on February 24, 2010.

Ghana Ambassador to the United States of America
- In office 7 December 2009 – 16 October 2014
- President: John Atta Mills
- Preceded by: Kwame Bawuah-Edusei
- Succeeded by: Joseph Henry Smith

Personal details
- Born: 10 March 1942 (age 84) Juaso, Gold Coast
- Party: National Democratic Congress
- Children: 5
- Education: Achimota School
- Occupation: Diplomat

Daniel Ohene Agyekum (born 10 March 1942) is a Ghanaian diplomat and politician who is member of the National Democratic Congress (NDC), who served as the former Ambassador to the United States of America during the John Evans Atta Mills government between 2009 and 2013. He has served as Regional Minister for Eastern, Ashanti and Greater Accra regions in the past. He also served as Minister of state in charge of Chieftaincy and State Protocol during the Jerry John Rawlings Government from 2000 to 2001.

Agyekum also held the Ashanti Regional Chairman position of the NDC from 2005 to 2008. He has been involved in the NDC's campaign activities since the parties inception in 1992 serving on several campaign teams especially in 2016, when he was appointed as a member of the National Campaign team and in 2018 when as appointed Campaign Manager for former President John Dramani Mahama's bid for and 2020 re-election respectively.

== Early life and education ==
Agyekum was born March 10, 1942, at Juaso in the Ashanti Region of Ghana (then Gold Coast), which was then a British colony. He started his primary basic education at Juaso. Ohene Agyekum then moved to Achimota School where he attained his G.C.E. Ordinary Level in 1960 and Advanced level in 1962 respectively. In 1965, Agyekum earned a Bachelor of Arts degree in history from the University of Ghana, Legon and joined the Ghana Foreign Service coincidentally that same year.

In 1966, he obtained a post-graduate diploma in Public Administration at the Ghana Institute of Management and Public Administration; as part of his diplomatic training, and he then furthered his education at Australian National University in Canberra, Australia where he earned an International Certificate in Diplomacy in 1970.

== Diplomatic career ==
Agyekum joined Ghana Foreign Service in 1965 right after completing his bachelor's degree, In 1966, shortly after the coup that deposed President Kwame Nkrumah, Ohene Agyekum was sent to his home region of Ashanti to serve as a District Administrative Officer, a position he held until 1969. He subsequently received his first diplomatic posting to Tel Aviv, Israel, after six years of joining the Foreign service. He served there from 1971 to 1974. Agyekum was moved to the Ghana Embassy in Copenhagen, Denmark where he also served from 1976 to 1981.

After serving in Cophenhagen he returned to Accra, Ghana in 1981 to serve as the deputy Director for the Middle East and Asia Divisions of the Ministry of Foreign Affairs till 1982 when he was reassigned to serve as Advisor on International Relations for Provisional National Defence Council (PNDC) within the period of Military rule under President Jerry John Rawlings.

=== Ambassador ===
==== Canada ====
He was appointed to serve as Ghana's High Commissioner (ambassador) to Canada in December 1986, a role that he served in for six years, until 1992. During his tenure in Ottawa as High Commissioner, Agyekum led Ghana's delegation in negotiations leading to the adoption of the Montreal Protocol on the substances that deplete the Ozone Layer, held in September 1987 in Canada.

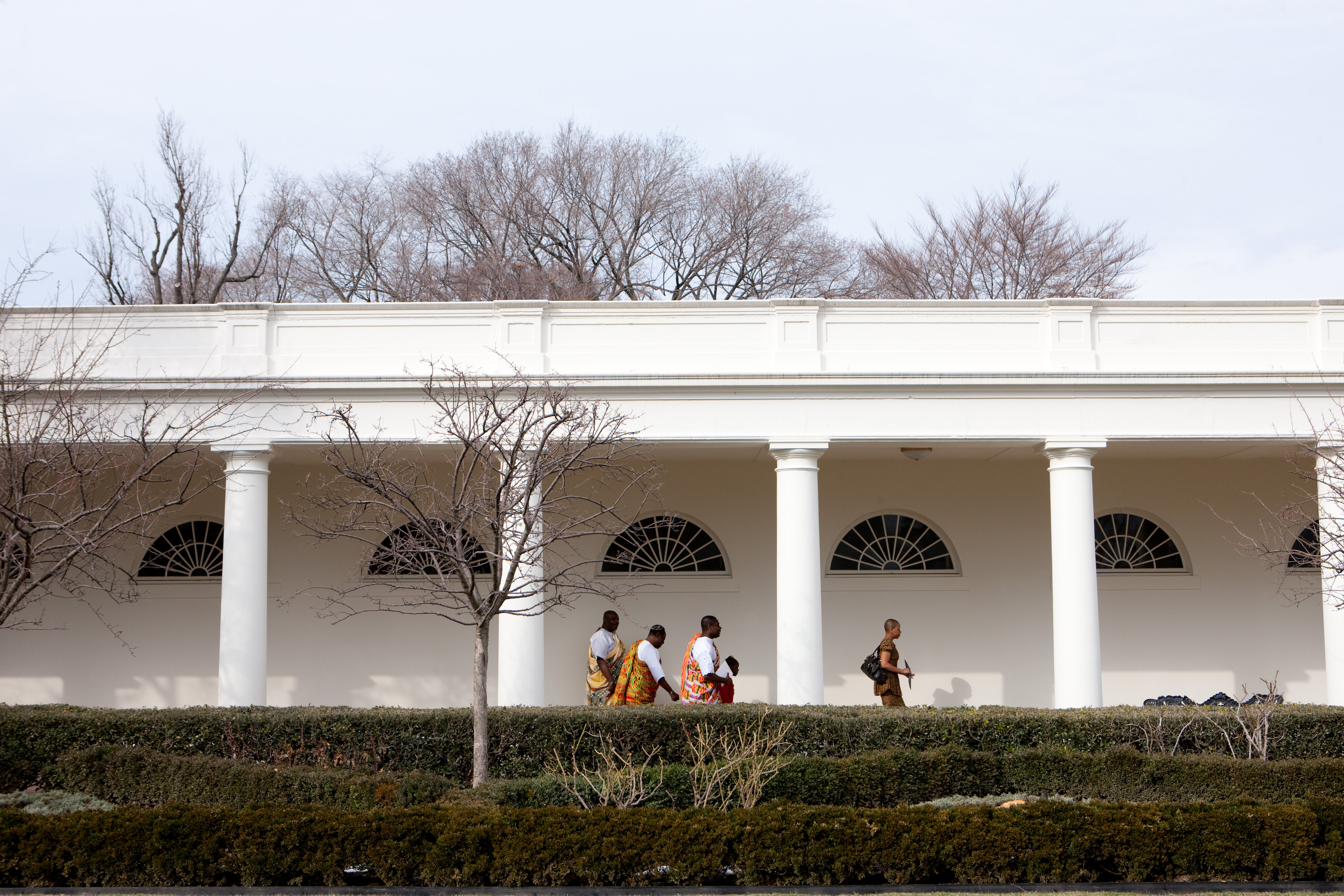
Ambassador Daniel Ohene Agyekum of Ghana, and his family, walk along the Colonnade of the White House, 2010

==== United States ====
Agyekum was appointed in October 2009 by President John Evans Atta Mills to serve as Ghana's Ambassador to the United States with co-accreditation in Mexico, the Virgin Islands, Belize, and Saint Kitts and Nevis. He presented his letter of credentials to President Barack Obama at the White House on 24 February 2010, two months after assuming office on 7 December 2009. He was joined by his family during the occasion. Out of the fact he had served as ambassador to Canada previously in 1982 to 1992, the Ghanaian community in the US warmly welcomed his appointment.

He was as a member of the delegation which included then Minister of Communications, Haruna Iddrisu, that represented Ghana at the 18th Plenipotentiary Conference of the International Telecommunication Union (ITU) in Guadalajara, Mexico in October 2010, that helped Ghana to maintain its seat on the 48-member council. He later presented his letter of credentials also to Mexican President Felipe Calderon at the Ceremonial Hall of the National Palace in Mexican City on 20 January 2011 even though he had already been working in that capacity since his appointment and arrival at the Embassy of Ghana in Washington, D.C.

== Political career ==
=== Minister of state ===
Whilst serving at the Ministry of Foreign Affairs Agyekum was moved to serve as advisor to the PNDC under Rawlings, after serving in that role he was subsequently appointed as Eastern Regional Secretary equivalent to Regional Minister from 1983 to 1986 in Rawlings administration.

Ohene Agyekum has been involved in Ghanaian politics since the 1990s, actively involved in the National Democratic Congress (NDC). He was appointed to serve as the Ashanti Regional Secretary from April 1992 to December 1992 within which period, President Jerry John Rawlings who had ruled since taking over power through a coup in 1981 had enacted a new constitution and had restored multi-party politics since Hilla Limann became president in 1979. Within that period Jerry Rawlings had been elected president after an election had been held in December 1992.

Agyekum served as a minister of state in the Jerry Rawlings NDC Government, from 1993 to 1998 he served as the Ashanti Regional Minister. After a cabinet reshuffle he was moved to serve as Greater Accra Regional Minister. He served in that role from November 1998 to January 2000, when he was appointed Minister of Chieftaincy Affairs and State Protocol. He served till January 2000 when his party lost power and handed over to the NPP Government.

=== NDC Regional Chairman ===
Agyekum vied for the position of Ashanti Regional Chairman for the NDC from 2005 He won and served till 2009. He is recognized as being the head of the NDC team that helped in restructuring the party within the region that ensured victory for John Evans Atta Mills in the Presidential Elections in 2008 after the party had lost in both 2000 and 2004 elections to the New Patriotic Party (NPP). He was succeeded as Regional Chairman by Yaw Owusu Obimpeh in December 2009 who was the Regional Youth Organizer during his tenure.

=== Campaign activities ===
In the run off to the 2016 elections, he was selected as a member of the NDC's 15-member national campaign team along with people like Joyce Bawah Mogtari, Felix Kwakye Ofosu, Kofi Adams, Dan Abodakpi, Samuel Ofosu-Ampofo and Johnson Asiedu Nketia as chairman. He was seen campaigning for his party on platforms in different villages and town making references to that a vote for his opponents would mean a vote to draw Ghana back and a reoccurrence of what happened to Kwame Nkrumah in the 1960s.

==== Campaign Manager ====
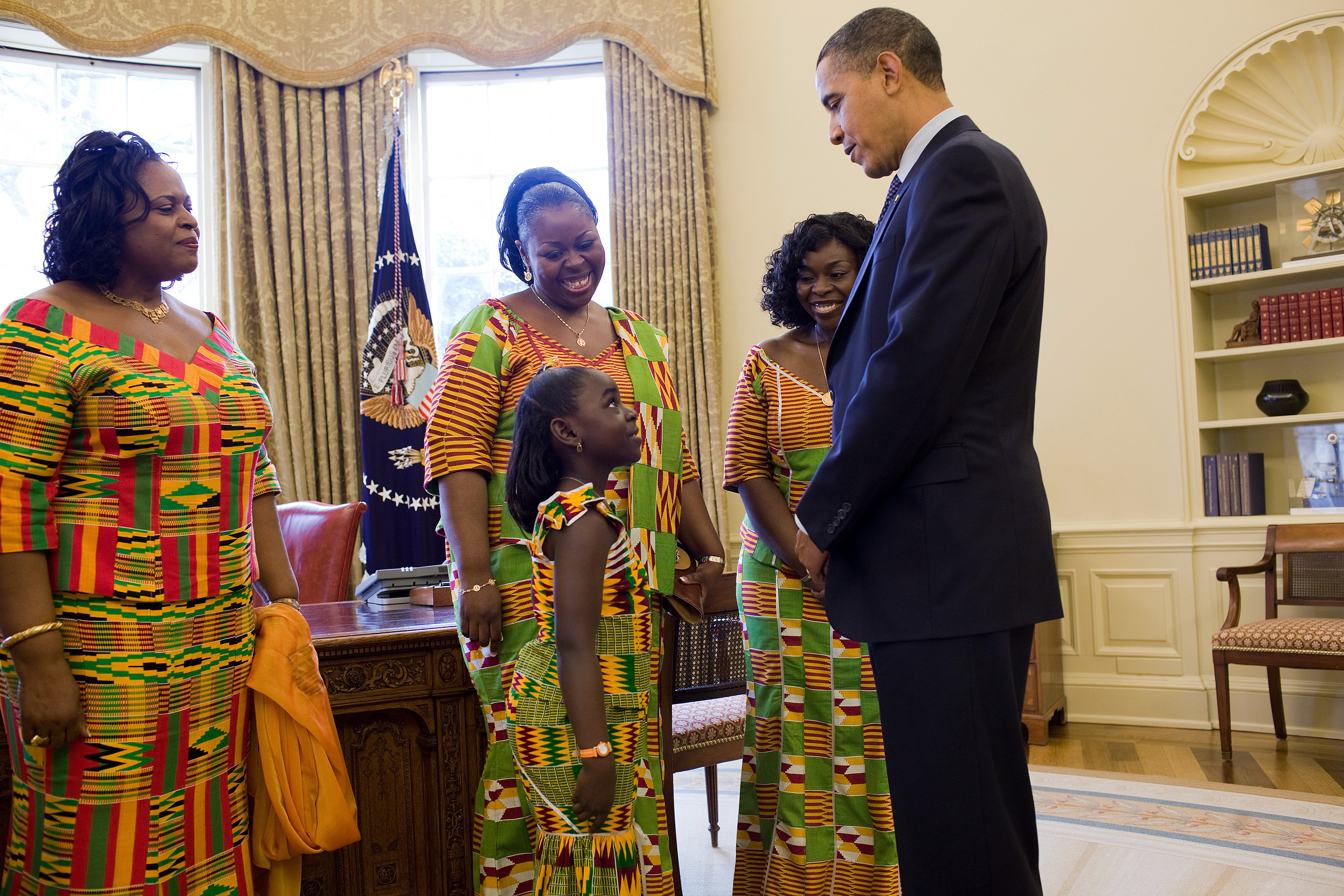
Barack Obama in talks with family members of Ambassador Daniel Ohene Agyekum of Ghana, 2010

In September 2018, ahead of the 2020 Elections, Agyekum was appointed as Campaign Manager to lead 12-member campaign coordinating team for John Dramani Mahama's comeback bid to lead the NDC into Election 2020. Other notable people who also served on the team were James Agyenim Boateng, Elsie Esenam Appau-Klu, Priscilla Arhin, Sherry Ayitey and Nii Vandepuye Djangmah.

== Personal life ==
Agyekum is married to Rose Ohene Agyekum and they have five children.

== See also ==
- Ashanti Regional Minister
- Rawlings government
