= Reginald Reynolds Amponsah =

Ghanaian politician (1919–2009)

Minister for Education
- In office 1971 – January 1972
- President: Edward Akufo-Addo
- Prime Minister: Kofi Abrefa Busia
- Preceded by: William Ofori Atta
- Succeeded by: Lieutenant-Colonel. Paul Nkegbe

Minister for Lands, Mineral Resources, Forestry and Wildlife
- In office 1969 – February 1971
- President: Edward Akufo-Addo
- Prime Minister: Kofi Abrefa Busia
- Preceded by: K. O. Thompson
- Succeeded by: T.D. Brodie Mends

Member of Parliament for Mampong North
- In office 1 October 1969 – 13 January 1972
- Preceded by: Constituency merged
- Succeeded by: Akwasi Afrifa

Personal details
- Born: 30 December 1919 Daaman, Ghana
- Died: 3 June 2009 (aged 89)
- Resting place: Adudwan, Ghana
- Party: Progress Party
- Other political affiliations: United Party; New Patriotic Party
- Education: Achimota School
- Alma mater: Staffordshire University; Royal College of Arts
- Profession: Potter, politician

Reginald Reynolds Amponsah (30 December 1919 – 3 June 2009) was a Ghanaian potter and politician of the first Parliament of the Second Republic representing the Mampong North constituency in the Ashanti region of Ghana. He was a Minister of State in the Busia government.

== Education ==
Amponsah completed his secondary education at the Achimota School in 1942. He was the school prefect for his year. Among his mates there were Victor Owusu, K. B. Asante, and Silas Dodu. He was awarded a scholarship to study pottery at Stoke on Trent in the United Kingdom.

== Politics ==
=== First republic ===
Amponsah was in opposition with the United Party in the first republic. Kwame Nkrumah's government, he was accused of plotting to overthrow the Convention People's Party government along with Victor Owusu, Apaloo, William Ofori Atta, Dzenkle Dzewu Joe Appiah and Major Awhaitey. During a BBC interview, he recalled his arrest in 1958:

A British police officer came to me and said “you are under arrest", "He pulled a gun and said “come at once or I will blow your head off."

Amponsah was jailed without trial under the Preventive Detention Act. He stayed there from 1958 until the coup d'état of 24 February 1966 which brought down the government of Kwame Nkrumah.

=== Second republic ===
Amponsah was appointed by Kofi Abrefa Busia as Minister for Lands, Mineral Resources, Forestry and Wildlife in his Progress Party government. He was later appointed Education minister and initiated the process for reforms in basic education in Ghana.

=== Fourth republic ===
During the fourth republic, he was the Chairman of the Council of Elders of the New Patriotic Party (NPP). He was influential in uniting various factions within the NPP leading up to the 2008 presidential and parliamentary elections.

== Other activities ==
Amponsah was chairman of the now-defunct Ghana Airways airline in the 1960s.

== Personal life ==
Amponsah was born at Daaman near Asante Mampong in the Sekyere West District of the Ashanti Region of Ghana. He was married with four children. He was buried on 3 September 2009 at Adudwan, also near Asante Mampong.

Political offices
Preceded by William Ofori Atta	Minister for Education; 1971–1972	Succeeded by ?
Preceded by ?	Minister for Lands, Mineral Resources, Forestry and Wildlife ?–1971	Succeeded by ?
Parliament of Ghana
Vacant Parliament suspended	Member of Parliament; 1969–1972	Vacant Parliament suspended
