= Daniel Kwesi Ashiamah =

Ghanaian politician (born 1968)

Member of the Ghana Parliament for Buem Constituency
- Incumbent
- Assumed office February 2013
- Preceded by: Henry Ford Kamel
- Succeeded by: Kofi Adams

Personal details
- Born: 3 December 1968 (age 57)
- Party: National Democratic Congress

Daniel Kwesi Ashiamah is a Ghanaian politician and member of the Seventh Parliament of the Fourth Republic of Ghana representing the Buem Constituency in the Volta Region on the ticket of the National Democratic Congress.

== Politics ==
Ashiamah is a member of the National Democratic Congress and was a member of parliament of the Seventh Parliament of the Fourth Republic of Ghana for Buem constituency in the Volta region.

=== 2016 election ===
Ashiamah contested the Buem constituency parliamentary seat on the ticket of the National Democratic Congress during the 2016 Ghanaian general election and won with 14,799 votes, representing 69.72% of the total votes cast. He won the election over Aziale Lawrence Kwami of the New Patriotic Party, Aziakpa Francis Kofi of the PPP, Nelson Asafo of the Convention People's Party and David Kofi Ahose (Independent). They obtained 5,896 votes, 233 votes, 193 votes and 106 votes respectively, equivalent to 27.78%, 1.10%, 0.91%, and 0.50% of the total votes respectively.
