= Samuel Wilberforce Awuku-Darko =

Ghanaian accountant and politician

Member of the Ghana Parliament for Suhum
- In office 1969–1972
- Preceded by: Kweku Amoa-Awuah
- Succeeded by: Ayisi E. A. Kwabena

Minister for Works
- In office 1969–1971
- President: Edward Akufo-Addo
- Prime Minister: Kofi Abrefa Busia

Minister for Works and Housing
- In office 1971–1972
- President: Edward Akufo-Addo
- Prime Minister: Kofi Abrefa Busia
- Preceded by: William Godson Bruce-Konuah

Personal details
- Born: Samuel Wilberforce Awuku-Darko; 23 May 1924 Afransu, Suhum, Gold Coast
- Spouse: Gladys Catherine Ama Anyankwabea
- Children: 8 (3 boys, 5 girls)
- Parent(s): Alice Akua Brepo and Ebenezer Kwaku Darko
- Education: Prince of Wales College

Samuel Wilberforce Awuku-Darko (born 23 May 1924) was a Ghanaian accountant and politician. He was a minister of state, serving in the capacity as Minister of Works in the Second Republic of Ghana. He also served as the President of the Institute of Chartered Accountants from 1967 to 1969. In 2018, they noted that he had died.

== Early life and education ==
He was born on 23 May 1924 at Afransu, near Mangoase in Suhum, a town in the Eastern Region of Ghana. He had his early education in 1929 at Presbyterian Junior School, Suhum. In 1935, he continued at the Presbyterian Boys' Middle Boarding School Akropong-Akuapim. He enrolled at Prince of Wales College, Achimota from 1939 to 1942. He later attended Trinity College, Suhum.

== Accountancy ==
He began his career as a second division at the income tax department in 1944. In 1950, he had professional training with Messrs Cassleton Elliott and company in Ghana, and in the United Kingdom as an articled clerk. He worked with the company from 1957 to 1958 and practised until 1969, when he entered politics. He served as the President of the Institute of Chartered Accountants from 1967 to 1969. He was also chairman of the Board of Governors of Suhum Secondary Technical School in 1966.

== Politics ==
In 1969, he was elected as the member of parliament representing the Suhum constituency. He served as a member of parliament for the constituency till 1972. He was also appointed Minister for Works in 1969. In 1971, the ministry for housing was merged with the ministry for works: he was thus the minister for works and housing from 1 February 1971 to 13 January 1972, when the Busia government was overthrown.

== See also ==
- Busia government
