= Akumfi Ameyaw Munufie =

Ghanaian politician and lawyer

Member of the Ghana Parliament for Techiman
- In office 1969–1972

Minister of Social Development
- In office 1969–1971
- President: Kofi Abrefa Busia

Minister of Youth, Rural Development and Social Welfare
- In office 1971–1972
- President: Kofi Abrefa Busia

Personal details
- Born: Akumfi Ameyaw Munufie; 2 December 1929 Techiman, Brong Ahafo Region, Gold Coast
- Died: 17 February 2006 (aged 76)
- Education: Holborn College

Akumfi Ameyaw Munufie was a lawyer, politician, and Ghanaian diplomat. He was the minister of social development and later minister of rural development and social welfare in the second republic, and he was Ghana's ambassador to Côte d'Ivoire in the fourth republic.

== Early life and education ==
Munufie was born on 2 December 1929 at Techiman in the Brong Ahafo Region. He began his education at Wenchi Methodist School and continued at Livingstone College in Akropong, Akwapim he later proceeded to Holborn College of Law, London.

== Career ==
His career begun as a teacher at the Techiman Methodist School he later entered into private law practice 1963 to 1969.

== Politics ==
In 1969 he was elected as a member of parliament representing Techiman. That same year he was appointed minister of Social Development. He served in this capacity until 1971. In 1971, he was appointed minister of Youth, Rural Development and Social Welfare. He remained in this position until January 1972 when the Busia government was overthrown by the SMC. In 1992 he joined the National Democratic Congress and became co-chairman of the party with Alhaji Issifu Ali. He was later appointed as Ghana's ambassador to Côte d'Ivoire. He was succeeded by Yaw Safo Boafo.

== Death ==
He died on 17 February 2006.

== See also ==
- Busia government
- MPs elected in the Ghanaian parliamentary election, 1969
