= Yaw Konadu =

Ghanaian politician (born 1926)

Member of the Ghana Parliament for Afigya-Kwabre
- In office June 1965 – February 1966
- Preceded by: New
- Succeeded by: Akenten Appiah-Menka

Personal details
- Born: Yaw Konadu; 25 August 1926 Buaman-Ashanti, Ashanti Region
- Party: Convention People's Party

Yaw Konadu (born 25 August 1926) was a Ghanaian politician. He was a member for parliament for the Afigya-Kwabre constituency from 1965 to 1966.

== Early life and education ==
Konadu was born on 25 August 1926 at Buaman-Ashanti in the Ashanti Region. He obtained his Standard 7 certificate in 1942 and continued at Commercial College from 1943 to 1945.

== Career and politics ==
Konadu begun as an Office and Store Assistant at U. A. C. from 1946 to 1948. In 1949 he joined SCOA as a storekeeper until 1953. From 1954 to 1957, he was a private businessman based in Kumasi. He joined the Ashanti Regional branch of AUC once more in 1957 as a Supervisor of wholesale trading. He worked in this capacity until 1963.

Kunadu became chairman of the Kumasi North Local Council from 1961 to 1963. He was elected member of parliament for the Afigya-Kwabre constituency from June 1965 until the Nkrumah government was overthrown in February 1966.

== Personal life ==
His hobbies included; political discussions and football.

== See also ==
- List of MPs elected in the 1965 Ghanaian parliamentary election
