= Buem =

Constituency in Ghana

- constituency for the Parliament of Ghana
- District: Jasikan District
- Region: Oti Region of Ghana

Current constituency
- Party: National Democratic Congress
- MP: Kofi Adams

The Buem constituency is one of the constituencies represented in the Parliament of Ghana. It elects one Member of Parliament (MP) by the first past the post system of election. It is located in the Jasikan district of the Oti Region of Ghana. The language spoken is a variation of the Guan language.

== Boundaries ==
The constituency is located within the Jasikan district of the Oti Region of Ghana. It is one of two constituencies in this district, the other being the Akan constituency. The constituency was originally located within the Volta Region of Ghana until new regions were created following the December 2018 referendum.

== Members of Parliament ==
First elected	Member	Party	Term
1956	Francis Yao Asare	Convention People's Party	1956 – 1965
1965	Eric Kwame Heymann	Convention People's Party	1965 – 1966
1969	Christopher Kwaku Nayo	National Alliance of Liberals	1969 – 1972
1979	Monica P. Atenkah	People's National Convention	1979 – 1981
1992	Emil Kwadzo Brantuo	National Democratic Congress	1992 – 2004
2004	Henry Ford Kamel	National Democratic Congress	2004 – 2012
2013	Daniel Kosi Ashiamah	National Democratic Congress	2013 – date

== Elections ==
NELSON ASAFO

2016 Ghanaian general election: Buem Source GhanaWeb
Party	Candidate	Votes	%	±%
National Democratic Congress	Daniel Kwesi Ashiamah	14,799	69.72	−14.96
New Patriotic Party	Aziale Lawrence Kwami	5,896	27.78	(+6.78)
Progressive People's Party	Aziakpa Francis Kofi	233	1.10	
Convention People's Party	Nelson Asafo	193	0.91	−5.55
Independent	David Kofi Ahose	106	0.50	—
Majority		8,903		
Turnout		21,227		

Due to the death of Henry Ford Kamel of the NDC, a by-election was scheduled for 26 February 2013. This was won by Daniel Kosi Ashiaman of the NDC with a majority of 8,640 (78%) votes.

2013 By-election: Buem Source:GhanaWeb
Party	Candidate	Votes	%	±%
National Democratic Congress	Daniel Kosi Ashiaman	9,366	84.68	+10.88
Convention People's Party	Nelson Asafo	726	6.46	+3.16
New Vision Party	Alhaji Muniru	251	2.27	—
People's National Convention	Adams Darko-Boateng	211	1.91	+0.01
Majority		8,640		
Turnout		11,247		—

2012 Ghanaian parliamentary election: Buem Source:Electoral Commission of Ghana Ghana Home Page
Party	Candidate	Votes	%	±%
National Democratic Congress	Henry Ford Kofi Kamel	19,031	73.8	8.0
New Patriotic Party	Francis Asuka-Boakye	5,404	21.0	−6.5
Convention People's Party	Nelson Asafo	850	3.3	2.4
People's National Convention	Darko-Boateng Adams	502	1.9	—
Majority		13,627	52.8	14.5
Turnout		26,252	70.7	—

2008 Ghanaian parliamentary election: Buem Source:Ghana Home Page
Party	Candidate	Votes	%	±%
National Democratic Congress	Henry Ford Kamel	1,2766	65.8	−4.2
New Patriotic Party	Bob-Charles Agbentor	5,340	27.5	5.5
Independent	Obeng Akyea Richard Asafoatse	755	3.9	—
Democratic Freedom Party	Patience Ama Yirenkyi	353	1.8	—
Convention People's Party	Kwabena Ahenkora Osei Boahene	179	0.9	—
Majority		12,426	38.3	−9.7
Turnout				—

2004 Ghanaian parliamentary election: Buem Source:National Electoral Commission, Ghana
Party	Candidate	Votes	%	±%
National Democratic Congress	Henry Ford Kamel	15,295	70.0	21.2
New Patriotic Party	Bob Charles Agbontor	4,807	22.0	15.0
Convention People's Party	Sosthenes Simon Sakyi	1,602	7.3	−0.3
People's National Convention	Mohammed Nurudeen	139	0.6	0.0
Majority		10,488	48.0	22.5
Turnout		21,743	84.8	—

2000 Ghanaian parliamentary election: Buem Source:Adam Carr's Election Archives
Party	Candidate	Votes	%	±%
National Democratic Congress	Emil Kwadzo Brantuo	9,610	48.8	−14.3
Independent	Adjei Richard Kwadwo	4,578	23.3	—
National Reform Party	Ernest A. Yeboah	2,356	12.0	—
Convention People's Party	Sosthenes S. Sakyi	1,500	7.6	—
New Patriotic Party	Sam Baidu Kelele	1,386	7.0	+2.2
United Ghana Movement	Nyame Manasseh Ebun	144	0.7	—
People's National Convention	Donkor S. Kwamena	110	0.6	+0.2
Majority		5,032	25.5	−6.4

1996 Ghanaian parliamentary election: Avenor-Ave Source:Electoral Commission of Ghana
Party	Candidate	Votes	%	±%
National Democratic Congress	Emil Kwadzo Brantuo	15,623	63.1	—
Democratic People's Party	Sosthenes Simon Sakyi	7,722	31.2	—
New Patriotic Party	Bani Nyarko Agyemang Charles	1,186	4.8	—
National Convention Party	Nayo Rockson	114	0.5	—
People's National Convention	Bobison Emmanuel Kwaku	99	0.4	—
Majority		7,901	31.9	—
Turnout		25,146	81.3	+10.3

1992 Ghanaian parliamentary election: Avenor-Ave Source:Electoral Commission of Ghana
Party	Candidate	Votes	%	±%
National Democratic Congress	Emil Kwadzo Brantuo			—
Majority				—
Turnout		19,650	71.0	—

== See also ==
- List of Ghana Parliament constituencies
