= Asokore Mampong =

Asokore Mampong Asokore Mampong
- Municipal
- Location within Ghana
- Coordinates: 6°42′N 1°36′W
- Country: Ghana
- Region: Ashanti Region
- District: Asokore Mampong Municipal District
- Elevation: 889 ft (271 m)
- Time zone: GMT
  - Summer (DST): GMT

Asokore Mampong is the capital of the Asokore Mampong Municipal Assembly, a district in the Ashanti Region of Ghana. Popularly known for Kumasi Academy a senior high school and the SSNIT affordable housing projects. The chief of Asokore Mampong is Nana Boakye-Ansah Debrah.

== Geography ==
=== Boundaries ===
The town is bordered on the north by Parkoso, and Mesuam, to the west by Sepe Tinpomu and Adanyasie, to the east by Nsenie-Kentinkronu and to the south by Ayigya.

=== Location ===
Asokore Mampong is 10 kilometres from the centre of Kumasi. Asokore Mampong is a dormitory town.

== Education ==
Asokore Mampong is known for Kumasi Academy, a second cycle institution located there.

Apart from being a residential area for workers in various companies in Kumasi, many hostels are available to serve the students from the Kwame Nkrumah University of Science and Technology (KNUST).

== Healthcare ==
The Garden City Hospital, Academy Clinic and Legacy Hospitals are located in Asokore Mampong.

== Notable places ==
The affordable housing projects has a huge site in the area for its buildings. There are two additional notable places. The Osei Tutu Nyamekesie and Okomfo Anokye sword are located in the town. The Asokore Mampong Palace is a huge and well designed edifice located in the centre of the town. The palace sits on a 4acre lot. it was designed and built by the chief of the town Nana Boakye-Ansah Debrah.
