= Sulemanu Kwame Tandoh =

Ghanaian diplomat and politician

Sulemanu Kwame Tandoh also known by the name Samuel Kwame Tandoh, was a Ghanaian diplomat and politician. He was a member of parliament for Bantama Consistency.

== Early life and education ==
Tandoh was born on 2 February 1924 at Nkwanta, in the Ashanti Region of Ghana (then Gold Coast). He attended Saint Peter's Catholic School, Kumasi, where he graduated in 1951.

== Career ==
Prior to entering parliament, he was the Vice President of the Kumasi Tenants of Kumasi and the Vice Chairman of the Convention People's Party for Kumasi North. In 1953, he was chairman of the Kwabre No.2 Local Council. Tandoh later became the Secretary of the Ashanti Regional Branch of the Convention People's Party. In 1962, Tandoh was appointed Ghana's ambassador to Albania. He worked in this capacity until 1965. He served as a member of parliament for the Bantama Constituency from 1965 until 24 February 1966 when the Nkrumah government was overthrown. Tandoh became a petty trader at Kaneshie after the overthrow.

== Personal life ==
Tandoh was a Christian and a member of the Catholic Church. He was president of the Catholic Youth Association. He loved to play tennis.
