= Bomso =

- Town
- Country: Ghana
- Time zone: UTC+0 (Casablanca)

Bomso is a town in Kumasi, in the Ashanti Region of Ghana. It is about 10 kilometres from the central business district Kumasi. It is a dormitory town.

Bomso is unofficially divided into three parts namely Old Bomso or Bomso Panin and Bomso Ketiwa and Susuanso.

Bomso is a usually quiet environment largely but because of the many hostel facilities serving students of the KNUST especially in and around the Old town, the place loses its serenity during school sessions. Criminals have also taken advantage of unsuspecting persons who are usually new to the place

Apart from being a residential area for workers in various companies in Kumasi, many hostels are available to serve the students from the Kwame Nkrumah University of Science and Technology. There are churches and school namely Church of Pentecost, Baptist Church, Bomso Government school, America Dream Educational Centre(AMDEC), Christian Preparatory School and others.

== Boundaries ==
The town is bordered on the north by Ayigya, to the West by [KNUST], to the east by Oforikrom and to the South by old Ahensan Estate(Sisankyi).

== Notable places ==
Bomso clinic is a private health facility in the community which offers various medical and specialist services to patients. Ultimate hostel also known as Evandy hostel is one of the most popular landmarks at Bomso.
