= William Godson Bruce-Konuah =

Ghanaian physician and politician

Member of the Ghana Parliament for Tema
- In office 1969–1972
- President: Edward Akufo-Addo
- Prime Minister: Kofi Busia
- Preceded by: Zuberu Baba Shardow
- Succeeded by: Seth Laryea Tetteh

Minister of Housing
- In office September 1969 – January 1971
- President: Edward Akufo-Addo
- Prime Minister: Kofi Abrefa Busia

Minister of Labour and Cooperatives
- In office January 1971 – January 1972
- President: Edward Akufo-Addo
- Prime Minister: Kofi Abrefa Busia
- Preceded by: Jatoe Kaleo
- Succeeded by: Major Kwame Asante

Personal details
- Born: 14 May 1932
- Died: 2 October 2002 (aged 70)
- Citizenship: Ghanaian
- Education: Accra Academy; Norwood College; University of Liverpool

William Godson Bruce-Konuah (14 May 1932 – 2 October 2002) was a Ghanaian physician, politician and a minister of state in the Second Republic.

== Early years and education ==
He was born on 14 May 1932. His father was Dr. Kofi George Konuah, CBE; an educationist. He had his early education at the Accra Government boys' school from 1936 to 1945 and proceeded to the Accra Academy where he had his secondary education from 1946 to 1951. In 1955 he enrolled at Norwood College, London where he was awarded his intermediate bachelor's degree in 1957 and also the University of Liverpool from 1958 to 1963 for his bachelor of medicine and bachelor of surgery (Mb Chb).

== Career ==
After his secondary education he taught at his alma mater; the Accra Academy from 1953 to 1955. After his tertiary education in Liverpool he returned to Ghana to work with the ministry of Health as a medical officer at Korle bu and later senior medical officer in charge of Tema Health Services and also in charge of Tema General Hospital until 1969 when he resigned to enter into politics. He later begun private medical practice. He represented Ghana (Ministry of health) at the World Health Organization Seminar on the control of Tuberculosis in 1969.

== Politics ==
In 1969 he was elected as the member of parliament for Tema Constituency. He was also appointed Minister of Housing in September 1969, he served in that capacity until January 1971 when he was appointed Minister of Labour and Cooperatives. He remained minister of this portfolio until January 1972 when the Busia government was overthrown by the General I. K. Acheampong's Supreme Military Council (Ghana).

== See also ==
- Busia government
- List of MPs elected in the 1969 Ghanaian parliamentary election
