= Asokore Mampong (municipal district) =

Municipal district in Ashanti Region, Ghana

Asokore Mampong Municipal District
- Municipal District
- Districts of Ashanti Region

- Location of Asokore Mampong Municipal District within Ashanti
- Coordinates: 6°42′N 1°36′W
- Country: Ghana
- Region: Ashanti
- Capital: Asokore Mampong

Area
  - Total: 24 km^{2} (9.3 sq mi)

Population (2021 Census)
  - Total: 191,402
  - Density: 8,000/km^{2} (21,000/sq mi)
- Time zone: UTC+0 (GMT)

Asokore Mampong Municipal District (AMMA) is one of the forty-three districts in Ashanti Region, Ghana. Originally it was a sub-metropolitan district council formerly known as Asawase within the Kumasi Metropolitan Assembly until 28 June 2012, when it was elevated to municipal district assembly status to become Asokore Mampong Municipal District. The municipality is located in the central part of Ashanti Region and has Asokore Mampong as its capital town.
