= Abetifi Presbyterian College of Education =

Teacher training college in Eastern region, Ghana

- Other name: Abetifi Presby College of Education
- Motto: Go forth and Shine
- Established: 1952
- Affiliations: University of Cape Coast
- Location: Abetifi-Kwahu, Kwahu East, EH0024, Ghana; 6.66639°N 0.73969°W
- Language: English
- Region Zone: Eastern; Eastern / Greater Accra
- Short name: Abetico
- Source: An Atlas of The Forty Colleges of Education in Ghana.

Abetifi Presbyterian College of Education is a teacher education college in Abetifi-Kwahu (Kwahu East, Eastern, Ghana). The college is located in Eastern / Greater Accra zone. It is one of about 40 public colleges of education in Ghana. The college participated in the DFID-funded T-TEL programme.

== History ==
The college was established with a higher intake of male students on 7 February 1952.

The pioneer intake was 30 male students. The Presbyterian Church was then in control of management with the late Rev. H. T. Dako serving as the appointed principal.

On 9 November 1953, the name of the college was changed to Techiman Training College – Abetifi, because it was initially planned to be sited at Techiman in the Brong Ahafo Region. Attempts were made to relocate the college, but in 1962, a final decision was made to retain the college at Abetifi. The college was therefore renamed Abetifi Training College.

In 1995, the name of the college was changed to Abetifi Presby Training College, but retained its Acronym ABETICO, and its motto “GO FORTH AND SHINE”.

The college was originally started as men's training college and its emplacement was in the Abetifi town in rented buildings. Two elders Opanin Addo Bruce and Yaw Tawiah (both deceased) gave out their buildings to house the college.

A new site was acquired for the college through Nana Adontenhene of Kwahu and indigenes of the Abetifi township. Later, a six-unit classroom was constructed for the college. From that commencement, the college has risen to its present position in terms of infrastructure.

The college initially offered the two-year Teacher's Cert ‘B’ course until 1963, when it was replaced with the Certificate ‘A’ – 4-year course.

The phasing out of some teacher-training colleges in the country during 1973/74 academic year necessitated the re-location of students from Anum and Wiawso Training Colleges to Abetifi Presbyterian College of Education (ABETICO)

During 1974/75 academic year, seventy men were admitted for the first time to the college's two-year post-secondary teacher-training course. Among this batch of students was Rev. Herbert Anim Oppong (former Clerk of General Assembly of the Presbyterian Church of Ghana).

Following a decision to turn the college into a Teachers' Resource Centre, no more students were admitted into the college during 1975 through to 1976 and 1976 through to 1977 academic years.

Abetifi College of Education later became a co-educational institution during the 1977/78 academic year when the first batch of female students was admitted into the college.

The college admitted blind students in the 1982/83 academic year. This was followed by the introduction of the 2-year modular teacher-training course in 1984/85. Both courses were phased out by the end of the 1990/91 academic year.

At the beginning of the 1987/88 academic year as part of the 1987 New Educational Reforms, the college admitted students to start the Teacher's certificate ‘A’ 3-year post-secondary training programme, with the first batch graduating in 1991.

The college offers the 3-year Diploma in Basic Education Course. The programme was started during the 2004/2005 academic year and the first batch of 225 students who completed their course in July 2007. Abetifi College of education is one of the oldest teacher training college of education celebrating it 55th Anniversary in 2007.

Since its inception in 1952, the college has turned out 5,662 trained-teachers of different categories for the educational enterprises of the country.

In 2016, Abetifi College of Education signed an affiliation MoU with the University of Cape Coast.

The college has been administered by the following principals:
Name	Years served
Rev. H.T. Dako	Feb. 1952 – Nov. 1965
Rev. S.K. Yobo	Nov. 1965 –Sept. 1973
Mr. D.A. Mamphey	Sept. 1973 – Sept. 1974
Mr. S.A. Birikorang	Sept. 1974 – Sept. 1982
Mr. Ofori Boahene	Sept. 1982 – Aug. 1987
Mr. E.K. Opoku	Aug. 1987 – Feb. 1995
Rev. E. Osafo Boateng	Feb. 1995 – Oct. 2002
Rev. F.N. Appertey	Oct. 2002 –
