= Busia government =

This is a listing of the ministers who served in Busia's Progress Party government during the Second Republic of Ghana. The Second Republic lasted from 1 October 1969 to 13 January 1972.

== List of ministers ==
Portfolio	Minister	Time frame	Notes
Prime Minister	Kofi Abrefa Busia	1 October 1969 – 13 January 1972	
Deputy Prime Minister	William Ofori Atta	?–?	
Deputy Prime Minister	J. Kwesi Lamptey	?–?	
Minister for Foreign Affairs	Victor Owusu	1969–1971	
Minister for Foreign Affairs	William Ofori Atta	1971 – 13 January 1972	
Minister for Interior	Simon Diedong Dombo	1969–1971	
Minister for Interior	Nicholas Yaw Boafo Adade	1971–1972	
Minister for Defence	J. Kwesi Lamptey	1969–1971	
Minister for Defence	Bukari Adama	27 Jan 1971 – 12 Jan 1972	
Attorney General and Minister for Justice	Victor Owusu	1971–1972	
Attorney General and Minister for Justice	Nicholas Yaw Boafo Adade	1969–1971	
Minister for Finance and Economic Planning	Joseph Henry Mensah	1969–1972	
Minister for Health	Simon Diedong Dombo	1971–1972	
Minister for Health	Gibson Dokyi Ampaw	1969–1971	
Minister for Local Government	Kwabena Kwakye Anti	1969–1971	
Minister for Education, Culture and Sport	William Ofori Atta	1969–1971	
Minister for Education, Culture and Sport	R. R. Amponsah	1971 – Jan 1972	
Minister for Agriculture	Kwame Safo-Adu	1969–1972	
Minister for Trade, Industry and Tourism	Richard Abusua-Yedom Quarshie	1969–1972	
Minister for Labour and Social Welfare	Jatoe Kaleo	1969–1971	
Minister for Labour and Social Welfare	William Godson Bruce-Konuah	1971–1972	
Minister for Transport and Communications	Haruna Esseku	1969–1971	
Minister for Transport and Communications	Jatoe Kaleo	1971–1972	
Minister for Works	Samuel Wilberforce Awuku-Darko	1969–1971	
Minister for Housing	William Godson Bruce-Konuah	1969–1971	
Minister for Housing	Samuel Wilberforce Awuku-Darko	1971–1972	
Minister for Social Development	Akumfi Ameyaw Munufie	1969–?	
Minister for Lands, Mineral Resources, Forestry and Wildlife	R. R. Amponsah	1969–1971	
Minister for Lands, Mineral Resources, Forestry and Wildlife	T.D. Brodie Mends	1971–1972	
Minister for Information	T.D. Brodie Mends	1 October 1969 – 27 January 1971	
Minister for Information		January 1971–January 1972	
Minister for Parliamentary Affairs	Bukari Adama	1969–1971	
Minister for Parliamentary Affairs	J. Kwesi Lamptey	1971–1972	
Minister of State (Protocol)	K.G. Osei Bonsu	1969–1972	

== Regional Chief Executives (Regional Ministers) ==
Portfolio	Minister	Time frame	Notes
Ashanti Regional Minister	H. R. Annan	1969–1972	
Brong Ahafo Region	A. A. Owusu	1969–1972	
Central Regional Minister	Jonah Abraham Annobil	1969–1972	
Eastern Regional Minister	A. K. Adu	1969–1971	
Eastern Regional Minister	G. L. A. Djabanor	1971–1972	
Greater Accra Regional Minister	A. S. O. Mensah	1969–1972	
Northern Regional Minister	J. A. Braimah	1969–1972	
Upper Region	Salifu Imoro	1969–1972	
Volta Regional Minister	Alfred Senaya Kpodonu	1969–1972	

== List of ministerial secretaries (Deputy Ministers) ==
Portfolio	Minister	Time frame	Notes
Minister for Interior	Kwaku Baah	1969–1972	
Minister for Defence	Mohammed Abdul-Saaka; Thomas Kwame Aboagye	1969–1972	
Minister for Foreign Affairs	John Agyekum Kufuor	1969–1972	
Minister for Works	Walter Horace Kofi-Sackey	1969–1972	
Minister for Housing	Ofresu Kwabena Poku	1969–1972	
Minister for Transport and Communications	Solomon Osei-Akoto, Joseph Yaw Manu	1969–1972	
Minister for Finance and Economic Planning	Jones Ofori Atta, Charles Omar Nyanor	1969–1972	
Minister for Youth and Rural development	Alexander Apeatu Aboagye da Costa, Carl Daniel Reindorf	1969–1972	
Attorney General	Akenten Appiah-Menka	1969–1972	
Office of the Prime Minister	Alexander Abu Abedi	1969–1972	
Minister for Information	Michael Kwasi Osei	1969–1972	
Minister for Labour and Co-operatives	Alfred Badu Nkansah	1969–1972	
Minister for National Service Corps	Samuel Kobina Casely Osei-Baidoo	1969–1972	
Minister for Agriculture	Shanni Mahama	1969–1972	
Minister for Trade, Industry and Tourism	Stephen Krakue	1969–1972	
Minister for Lands, Mineral Resources, Forestry and Wildlife	Anane Antwi-Kusi, Daniel Poku Agyekum	1969–1972	
Minister for Health	Joseph Godson Amamoo, Adam Amandi	1969–1972	
Minister for Education, Culture and Sports	Sabastien Kwaku Opon, Oheneba Kow Eduakoh Richardson	1969–1972	
Minister for Local Authority	Justice Akuamoa Boateng, John Kofi Fynn	1969–1972	

== See also ==
- Progress Party

== External sources ==
- The Statesman's Year-Book 1970-71; Editors: Paxton, J. (Ed.)

Preceded by National Liberation Council (1966–1969)	Government of Ghana; 1969–1972	Succeeded by National Redemption Council (1972–1975)
