= Jatoe Kaleo =

Ghanaian politician (1928–1998)

Member of the Ghana Parliament for Wala North
- In office 1969–1972

Minister of Labour, Social Welfare and Co-operatives
- In office 1969–1971
- President: Edward Akufo-Addo
- Prime Minister: Kofi Abrefa Busia
- Succeeded by: William Godson Bruce-Konuah

Minister for Transport and Communications
- In office 1971–1972
- President: Kofi Abrefa Busia
- Preceded by: Haruna Esseku
- Succeeded by: Lt. Col. Anthony Selormey

Personal details
- Born: July 1928 Kaleo, Gold Coast
- Died: 6 June 1998 (aged 69)
- Citizenship: Ghanaian

Jatoe Kaleo (1928–1998) was a Ghanaian traditional ruler, politician and founding member of the Northern Peoples Party.

== Early life and education ==
Jatoe Kaleo was born in July 1928 at Kaleo a Village in the Nadowli District of the Upper West Region of Ghana. He was educated at the Native Authority Primary Boarding School, at Wa in the Upper West Region of Ghana from 1935 to 1941. He continued his education in 1942 at Tamale Government Middle Boarding School where he completed in 1945.

== Career ==
In 1946 he was appointed Assistant Treasurer of the Wa Native Authority. He resigned from the Native Authority Administration in Wa, and proceeded to the Tamale Government Teacher Training College for the teachers certificate B course. He qualified in 1948 and went back to the Kaleo Day Primary as its substantive Head Teacher. He went back to the Tamale Government Teacher's Training College, and qualified in 1952, as a Certificate 'A' Teacher. He was appointed the Head Teacher of Naro Primary School in 1953 but in 1954 he resigned from the Teaching service and entered politics.

== Politics ==
He was elected member of Wala district council in 1953 and became chairman of the council in 1954. In 1956 he was elected member of the national assembly for Wala North. He served as a member of parliament until 1966 when parliament was dissolved due to a coup d'état. He served as a member of the electoral commission as well as a member of the Board of Directors of Graphic Corporation during the NLC era of Lt. Gen A. A. Afrifa. In 1969 he was elected member of parliament for Nadawli constituency and also appointed Minister of Labour Social Welfare and Co-operatives until 1971. He was Minister of transport and communication from 1971 to 1972. After General I. K. Acheampong's coup d'état on 13 January 1972 he went back to Kaleo village, where he was a chief, as well as an opinion leader. He was appointed chairman of the Ghana Prisons' Council in 1985.

== Death ==
He died on 6 June 1998 and was buried in his hometown; Kaleo.

== See also ==
- Minister for Communications (Ghana)
- Busia government
