= Akenten Appiah-Menka =

Ghanaian lawyer, politician and businessman

Member of the Ghana Parliament for Afiagya-Kwabre
- In office 1969–1972
- President: Edward Akufo-Addo
- Prime Minister: Kofi Abrefa Busia
- Preceded by: Yaw Konadu
- Succeeded by: Kwadwo Ofori-Kuragu

Personal details
- Born: 3 July 1933
- Died: 13 February 2018 (aged 83)
- Education: Abuakwa State College; Adisadel College
- Alma mater: University of Manchester
- Occupation: Politician; Entrepreneur
- Profession: Lawyer

Akenten Appiah-Menka was a Ghanaian lawyer, politician and businessman. He was the deputy minister for trade and industry and later deputy attorney general in the second republic.

== Early life and education ==
Appiah-Menka was born on 3 July 1933 at Aboabogya, a town in the Kwabre district near Kumasi in the Ashanti Region to Eno Akosua (his mother) and Opanin Amponsah Adiyia (his father) who died when he was a few months old in his mother's womb. He had his middle school education at Aboabogya Methodist School. He proceeded to Abuakwa State College, Kibi for his cambridge certificate and Adisadel College for his advanced level certificate. He stowed away from the Takoradi Port through a French cargo and landed in Marseille. He was sent to England on train in 1954. There, he enrolled at the Northwestern Polytechnic, London (now University of North London) that same year and obtained his GCE advanced level certificate in 1955. He continued at the University of Manchester in 1956 to study law and graduated in 1959. He was called to the bar at Lincoln's Inn.

== Career ==
He returned to Ghana in 1960 and entered private legal practice as a barrister and a solicitor working as an associate of the Yaanom Chambers which was then headed by Nicholas Yaw Boafo Adade. He worked as a legal practitioner until 1969 when he entered politics.

As a civil servant, he served in the Atta Mills administration when he was appointed a member of the Constitution Review Commission.

== Politics ==
In 1969 he was elected; member of parliament representing the Afigya-Kwabre constituency. He contested with Agyemang Alexander Frederick of the National Alliance of Liberals, Baffour Ankoma of the United Nationalist Party and Otuo Siriboe of the People's Action Party. That same year he was appointed deputy Minister for Trade. In 1971 after the reshuffle he was made deputy Attorney General. He served in this position until 1972 when the Busia government was overthrown. He was detained by the Supreme Military Council (then National Redemption Council) after the overthrow and was released in 1973.

In 1993 he was a founding member of the New Patriotic Party, he later became a member of the council of elders of the New Patriotic Party and also Chairman of the council of elders of the party's Ashanti Regional branch. During the Akufo-Addo administration he was appointed chairman of the party/government committee; a committee whose core mandate was to ensure that there was a coordinated and cordial working relation between the incumbent party (New Patriotic Party) and the government.

== Business ==
He acquired a 600-acre land in Akrofum near Obuasi and started a palm oil plantation which became the Ashanti Oil Mills. The company produced edible oil. The business grew to become the Appiah Menka Complex Ltd that manufactured Appino soap; a popular detergent soap of the 1980s and crocodile pale. The soap production begun in Kumasi through a joint venture with the National Investment Bank. He was Managing Director and later Chairman of the Appiah Menka Complex Ltd, the Ashanti Oil Mills, and the Appiah Menka plantations. He was in jail from 1983 to 1984 over a land dispute in the Nzema area of the Western Region.

Due to his industrial exploits he was once made President of the Association of Ghana Industries.

== Personal life ==
He married Mrs. Rosemond Appiah-Menka (née Gyamfi) in 1960. His hobbies included golf, football and cartoon reading.

== Death and tributes ==
He died on 13 February 2018. All NPP flags in the various regions and constituencies of the country were flown at half-mast for seven days following his death. His burial ceremony was held on 24 May 2018 in Kumasi. He was buried in his hometown Aboabogya.

Nana Akufo-Addo; president of the republic of Ghana paid a tribute to him saying:

"I have lost a valued senior counsellor. He was an invaluable and constant source of advice and prayers for me and was overjoyed when I won the presidential election in 2016."

The former president of Ghana; John Dramani Mahama also paid tribute to him saying:

"The death of Akenten Appiah Menka should charge Ghanaians with the responsibility to continue the pursuit of constitutionalism."

== See also ==
- List of MPs elected in the 1969 Ghanaian parliamentary election
- Busia government
