= Jasikan District =

Jasikan Municipal District
- District
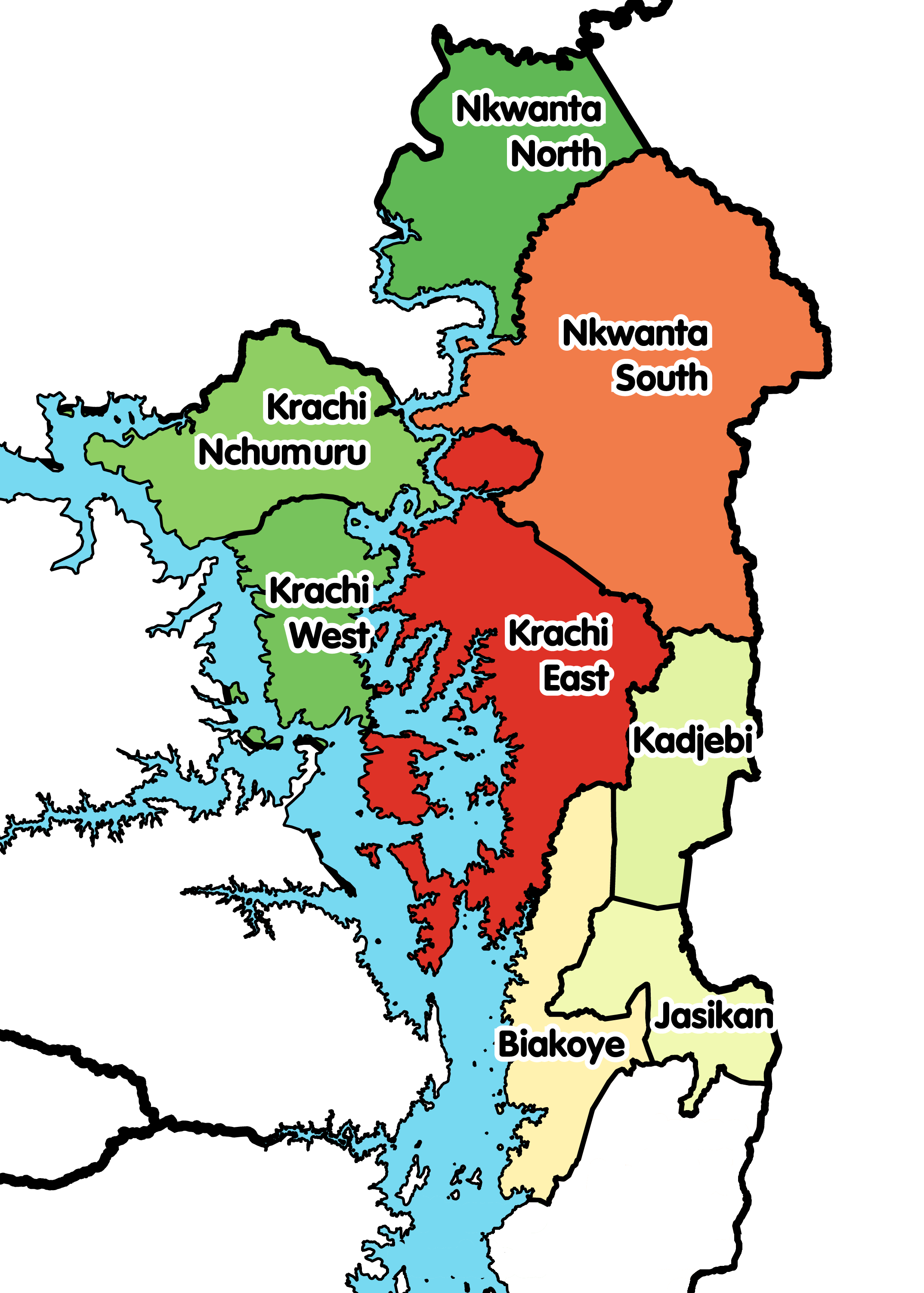
- Districts of Oti Region

- Location of Jasikan District within Oti
- Coordinates: 7°24′39.6″N 0°28′4.8″E
- Country: Ghana
- Region: Oti
- Capital: Jasikan

Government
  - Municipal Executive: Hon. Lawrence Kwami Aziale

Area
  - Total: 1,355 km^{2} (523 sq mi)

Population (2019)
  - Total: 72,607
- Time zone: UTC+0 (GMT)
- ISO 3166 code: GH-OT-JA

Jasikan Municipal District is one of the nine districts in Oti Region, Ghana. Originally created as an ordinary district assembly on 10 March 1989, which was created from the former Jasikan District Council, which it was established by Legislative Instrument (L.I.) 1464, until the western part of the district was split off to create Biakoye District on 29 February 2008, which was established by Legislative Instrument (L.I.) 1901; thus the remaining part has been retained as Jasikan District. It was elevated to municipal status on 11th May, 2021. The district assembly is located in the southern part of Oti Region and has Jasikan as its capital town.

== Boundaries ==
Jasikan District is bounded by:

- Lake Volta to the west
- Kpando Municipal District and Hohoe Municipal District to the south
- Krachi East District and Kadjebi District to the north

== Towns and villages ==
In addition to Jasikan, the capital and administrative centre, Jasikan District contains the following towns and villages in Buem in alphabetical order.

- Agbesi Madro
- Agomeyor
- Akpafu Todzi
- Akpafu Adorkor
- Akpafu Mempeasem
- Amenyo Yaw
- Akaa
- Akaa Quarters
- Akaa Tank
- Akaa Yaw
- Atakrom
- Atonkor
- Awoma
- Baglo Buem
- Bodada
- Baglo Odumasi
- Dzoku
- Dzolu
- Guama
- Idjeli
- Kayadah
- Kankyi Ekura
- Kudje
- Kute
- Kwanta
- Kwansim
- Lekanti
- New Ayoma
- New Baika
- Nsuta
- Nananko
- Okadjakrom
- Old Baika
- Old Ayoma
- Osei Krom
- Teteman

== Education ==
Jasikan College of Education is one of the College's in Oti Region.

== See also ==
- "Districts of Ghana". Statoids.
