= List of MLAs elected in the 1956 Gold Coast general election =

Colonial Era
1951 Assembly	(election)
1954 Assembly	(election)
1956 Assembly	(election)
First Republic
1957 Parliament	(election)
1965 Parliament	(election)
Second Republic
1969 Parliament	(election)
Third Republic
1979 Parliament	(election)
Fourth Republic
1st Parliament	(1992)
2nd Parliament	(1996)
3rd Parliament	(2000)
4th Parliament	(2004)
5th Parliament	(2008)
6th Parliament	(2012)
7th Parliament	(2016)
8th Parliament	(2020)
9th Parliament	(2024)

This is a list of people elected to the Legislative Assembly of the Gold Coast on 17 July 1956. The membership was maintained at 104.

== Composition ==
Affiliation	Members
Convention People's Party (CPP)	71
Northern People's Party (NPP)	15
National Liberation Movement (NLM)	12
Togoland Congress (TC)	2
Independents	2
Federation of Youth Organizations (FYO)	1
Muslim Association Party (MAP)	1
Total	104
Government Majority	38

== List of MPs elected in the general election ==
General elections were held on to elect a parliament prior to the Gold Coast being granted independence from colonial rule by the United Kingdom. The new assembly was opened on 31 July 1956. A few days later, on 3 August 1956, a motion was passed by the new assembly authorising the government to request the government of the United Kingdom to enact an act of parliament to provide for the establishment of the Gold Coast as an independent sovereign nation with the name Ghana. This parliament would continue after the country becomes independent as the first parliament in the Republic

=== Ashanti Protectorate - 20 seats ===
Constituency	Elected MP	Elected Party	Comment	Previous MP	Previous Party
Adansi Banka	John Young Ghann	CPP		John Young Ghann	CPP
Agona Kwabre	Victor Owusu	NLM	Victor Owusu was replaced by Martin Kyerematen in 1961 after he was detained for allegedly plotting a coup to overthrow the then Nkrumah government	J. E. Jantuah	
Ahafo	A. W. Osei	NLM		A. K. Senchirey	CPP
Amansie East	J. D. Wireko	NLM		A. R. Boakye	CPP
Amansie West	Robert Benjamin Otchere	NLM		K. A. Amankwa	CPP
Ashanti-Akim	Charles de Graft Dickson	CPP		Charles de Graft Dickson	CPP
Atebubu	William Ntoso	NLM		J. S. Yeboah	CPP
Atwima-Amansie	Joe Appiah	NLM	Arrested in 1961	Isaac Joseph Adomako-Mensah	CPP
Atwima Nwabiagya	Benjamin Freeman Kusi	NLM		J. Baidoo	CPP
Berekum	J. G. Awuah	CPP	Died in office in 1957 and replaced by Isaac William Benneh	J. G. Awuah	CPP
Kumasi North	Cobina Kessie	MAP	Appointed ambassador to Liberia 1958	Archie Casely-Hayford	CPP
Kumasi South	E. K. K. Taylor	CPP	By-election 1959	Edward Asafu-Adjaye	CPP
Obuasi	R. O. Amoako-Atta	CPP		R. O. Amoako-Atta	CPP
Offinso Kwabre	J. A. Owusu-Ansah	NLM		C. C. K. Addei	CPP
Sekyere East	Krobo Edusei	CPP		Krobo Edusei	CPP
Sekyere West	R. R. Amponsah	NLM	R. R. Amponsah was replaced by Solomon Antwi Kwaku Bonsu in 1959 when he was detained under the PDA act.	O. Bonsu	CPP
Sunyani East	Boahene Yeboah-Afari	CPP	Arrested in 1962, replaced by Kyere Awua Gyan.	Boahene Yeboah-Afari	CPP
Sunyani West	Stephen Willie Yeboah	CPP		Stephen Willie Yeboah	CPP
Wenchi East	C. S. Takyi	CPP	3,754 votes	C. S. Takyi	CPP
Wenchi West	Kofi Abrefa Busia	NLM		Kofi Abrefa Busia	GCP
=== Eastern Province - 23 seats ===
Constituency	Elected MP	Elected Party	Majority	Previous MP	Previous Party
Abetifi	Eugene Atta Agyepong	NPP	3,046	Eugene Atta Agyepong	NPP
Accra Central (Ashiedu Keteke)	Kwame Nkrumah	CPP	Dr. Kwame Nkrumah was replaced by Henry Sonnie Torgbor Provencal in a by-election on 30 August 1960.	Kwame Nkrumah	CPP
Accra East	Ebenezer Ako-Adjei	CPP		Ebenezer Ako-Adjei	CPP
Accra West	Robert Mensah Abbey	CPP		Thomas Hutton-Mills	CPP
Ada	Andrews Kwabla Puplampu	CPP		Charles Ofoe Cludeto Amattey	CPP
Akim Abuakwa Central	Aaron Ofori-Atta	CPP		Aaron Ofori-Atta	CPP
Akim Abuakwa East	Kwaku Amoa-Awuah	CPP		Kwaku Amoa-Awuah	CPP
Akim Abuakwa North	C. E. Nimo	CPP		C. E. Nimo	CPP
Akim Abuakwa South	Kwasi Sintim Aboagye	CPP		Kwasi Sintim Aboagye	CPP
Akim Abuakwa West	Michael Reynolds Darku-Sarkwa	CPP	Died 1964	S. A. Owusu-Afari	CPP
Akwapim North	J. R. Asiedu	CPP	Was appointed Speaker of parliament in 1960 and was replaced by Kwasi Asante Sakyi	J. R. Asiedu	CPP
Akwapim South	K. Asiam	CPP		K. Asiam	CPP
Dangbe-Shai	Edward Ago-Ackam	CPP		C. T. Nylander	CPP
Ga Rural	C. T. Nylander	CPP	By-election in 1963	Mabel Dove Danquah (First female MP)	CPP
Juaben-Edweso	Issac Boaten Asafu-Adjaye	NLM			
Kwahu North	Erasmus Isaac Preko	CPP		Erasmus Isaac Preko	Independent
Kwahu South	W. A. Wiafe	CPP		W. A. Wiafe	CPP
Manya Krobo	A. Mate Johnson	CPP		A. Mate Johnson	CPP
New Juaben	M. O. Kwatia	CPP		S. G. Nimako	CPP
North Birim	Albert Kwame Onwona Agyeman	CPP		A. E. Attafuah	CPP
Osudoku	Edmund Nee Ocansey	CPP		Alex Kwablah	Independent
South Birim	Archie Casely-Hayford	CPP		D. K. A. Kwarteng	CPP
Western Gomoa	Kojo Botsio	CPP		Kojo Botsio	CPP
=== Northern Territories - 26 seats ===
Constituency	Elected MP	Elected Party	Majority	Previous MP	Previous Party
Bawku	Baba Ayagiba	CPP		Amadu Amandi	Independent
Bolga	F. R. A. Adongo	NPP		R. B. Braimah	NPP
Bongo	W. A. Amoro	CPP		W. A. Amoro	CPP
Builsa	A. Afoko	CPP		A. Afoko	CPP
Dagomba East	J. H. Allassani	CPP		J. H. Allassani	CPP
Dagomba North	S. I. Iddrisu	CPP		S. I. Iddrisu	CPP
Dagomba South	Yakubu Tali (Tolon-Na)	NPP		Yakubu Tali (Tolon Naa)	NPP
Frafra East	Tubrow Kapeon Yentu	NPP		Tubrow Kapeon Yentu	NPP
Gonja East	J. A. Braimah	NPP		J. A. Braimah	Independent
Gonja West	Emmanuel Adama Mahama	CPP		Emmanuel Adama Mahama	CPP
Gulkpegu-Nanton	R. S. Iddrisu	CPP		A. Osumanu	NPP
Jirapa-Lambussie	Simon Diedong Dombo	NPP		Chief Simon Diedong Dombo (leader of NPP)	NPP
Kassena-Nankanni North	C.K. Tedam	NPP		C.K. Tedam	CPP
Kassena-Nankani South	Lawrence Rosario Abavana	CPP		Lawrence Rosario Abavana	CPP
Kusasi Central	J. Awuni	NPP		J. Awuni	NPP
Kusasi East	Idana Asigri	NPP		I. Asigri	NPP
Kusasi West	Ayeebo Asumda	CPP		Ayeebo Asumda	CPP
Lawra-Nandom	Abayifaa Karbo	NPP		Abayifaa Karbo	NPP
Nanum-Dagbon	Nantogma. Atta	CPP		Nantogma. Atta	CPP
Savelugu	Salifu Yakubu	NPP	Moved from NPP to join CPP in 1958.	S. Bukari	Independent
South Mamprusi East	Mumuni Bawumia	NPP		Mumuni Bawumia	NPP
South Mamprusi West	Mahama Tampurie	NPP		J. K. Yakubu	CPP
Talensi	D. D. Balagumyetime	CPP		A. T. Anaffu	Independent
Tumu	Mummuni E. K. Dimbie	NPP		Imoru Egala	
Wala North	Jatoe Kaleo	NPP		Jatoe Kaleo	NPP
Wala South	Bukari Kpegla Adama	NPP		Bukari Kpegla Adama	NPP
=== Transvolta Togoland - 14 seats ===
Constituency	Elected MP	Elected Party	Majority	Previous MP	Previous Party
Akan Krachi	Joseph Kodzo	CPP		Joseph Kodzo	CPP
Anlo East	Charles Henry Chapman	CPP		Charles Henry Chapman	CPP
Anlo North	Nelson Maglo	CPP		Nelson K. Maglo	CPP
Anlo South	Modesto K. Apaloo	FYO		Modesto K. Apaloo (Leader of AYO)	AYO
Buem	Francis Yao Asare	CPP		Francis Yao Asare	CPP
Central Tongu	F. K. D. Goka	CPP		F. K. D. Goka	CPP
Ho East	Rev. Francis Richard Ametowobla	Independent	Sought political asylum 1960 and was replaced	Rev. Francis Richard Ametowobla	Independent
Ho West	Kodzo Ayeke	TC		Kodzo Ayeke	TC
Keta	Komla Agbeli Gbedemah	CPP	Resigned in 1961, was replaced by Christian Kobla Dovlo.	Komla Agbeli Gbedemah	CPP
Kpandu North	S. G. Antor	TC		S. G. Antor (Leader of TC)	TC
Kpandu South	G. R. Ahia	CPP		G. R. Ahia	CPP
Mid-Volta	John R. Arjarquah	CPP		J. Arjarquah	CPP
South Tongu	Benjamin Alphonsus Konu	CPP		W. M. N. Djietror	CPP
Upper Tongu	Stephen Allen Dzirasa	CPP		Stephen Allen Dzirasa	CPP
=== Western Province - 22 seats ===
Constituency	Elected MP	Elected Party	Majority	Previous MP	Previous Party
Abura Asebu	J. E. Hagan	CPP		J. E. Hagan	
Agona	W. A. C. Essibrah	CPP		A. D. Appiah	Independent
Agona Swedru	E. K. Bensah	CPP		E. K. Bensah	CPP
Ahanta-Shama	Ashford Emmanuel Inkumsah	CPP		Ashford Emmanuel Inkumsah	CPP
Ajumako-Asikuma	Anthony Seibu Alec Abban	CPP		Anthony Seibu Alec Abban	CPP
Amenfi-Aowin	P. K. K. Quaidoo	CPP	P. K. K. Quaidoo was detained in 1962 and was replaced by James Kwame Twum.	P. K. K. Quaidoo	CPP
Assin	Daniel Buadi	CPP		Daniel Buadi	CPP
Awutu	Alfred Jonas Dowuona-Hammond	CPP		Alfred Jonas Dowuona-Hammond	CPP
Bibiani	James Kodjoe Essien	CPP		James Kodjoe Essien	CPP
Cape Coast	Nathaniel Azarco Welbeck	CPP		Nathaniel Azarco Welbeck	CPP
Denkyira	F.E. Techie-Menson	CPP		F.E. Techie-Menson	CPP
Eastern Gomoa	C. C. K. Baah	CPP		C. C. K. Baah	CPP
Eastern Nzima-Axim	W. Baidoe-Ansah	CPP		W. Baidoe-Ansah	CPP
Ekumfi-Enyan	S. K. Otoo	CPP	Replaced in 1958	S. K. Otoo	CPP
Elmina	K. O. Thompson	CPP		K. O. Thompson	CPP
Saltpond	Kofi Baako (Chief Whip)	CPP		Kofi Baako	CPP
Sefwi Wiawso	William Kwabena Aduhene	CPP		M. Y. Kumi	CPP
Sekondi-Takoradi	John Arthur	CPP		John Arthur	CPP
Wassaw Central	Samuel Emanful Arkah	CPP		Samuel Emanful Arkah	CPP
Wassaw South	Emmanuel Kwamena Dadson	CPP		K. Ocran	Independent
Western Nzima	J. B. Erzuah	CPP	Was appointed ambassador in 1957 and replaced by John Benibengor Blay.	J. B. Erzuah	CPP
Yilo Krobo	Emmanuel Humphrey Tettey Korboe	CPP		Emmanuel Humphrey Tettey Korboe	CPP

== Changes ==
- Kusasi Central constituency - In August 1957 Awuni joined the CPP and represented the constituency as a member of the CPP until 1965.
- Ekumfi-Enyan constituency - 1958 - S. K. Otoo was replaced by Kwaku Boateng in 1958 to represent the constituency in parliament.
- Ho East constituency - March 1960 - The Ho East constituency was declared vacant in March 1960 when Rev. Ametowobla sought political asylum in Togo. The seat was subsequently occupied by Emmanuel Yaw Attigah of the CPP. Attigah remained MP for the constituency from 1960 to 1965.
- Atwima Amansie - 1961 - Joe Appiah was arrested in 1961 and was replaced by Isaac Joseph Adomako-Mensah who had been the legislative member for the Atwima-Amansie electoral area from 1954 to 1956.
- Eastern Nzima-Axim John Alicoe Kinnah of the CPP was the MP for this constituency by 1961.
- Anlo South In February 1962, Daniel Apedoh, who was elected to replace Modesto Apaloo following his detention was himself among a number of opposition members of parliament arrested leaving only 6 opposition MPs in the 114 seat parliament.

== By-elections ==
- Berekum constituency - 25 April 1957 - A by-election was held due to the death of J. G. Awuah, the sitting CPP MP. The seat was won by Isaac William Benneh also of the CPP following Awuah's death.
- Kumasi North constituency - 1959 - Cobina Kessie was appointed Ghana's ambassador to Liberia in 1959 and Daniel Emmanuel Asafo-Agyei was elected on the ticket of the CPP to replace him as the member of parliament for the Kumasi North constituency.
- Kumasi South constituency - 1959 - Osei Owusu Afriyie of the CPP was elected MP in April 1959, replacing Edward Asafu-Adjaye.
- June 1960 - There were a total of 10 women elected unopposed in this by-election. Three women, Susanna Al-Hassan, Ayanori Bukari and Victoria Nyarko became Members of Parliament representing the Northern Region. Grace Ayensu and Christiana Wilmot won the Western Region seats. The rest were Sophia Doku and Mary Koranteng, Eastern Region, Regina Asamany, Volta Region, Comfort Asamoah, Ashanti Region, and Lucy Anin, Brong Ahafo Region.
- Accra Central - 1960 - Henry Sonnie Torgbor Provencal won the by-election held on 30 August 1960 to replace Dr. Kwame Nkrumah who had become head of state and no longer capable of representing his constituency, Accra Central in parliament.
- Ga Rural constituency - 1963 - Paul Tekio Tagoe won the by-election held on 12 February 1963 unopposed to become the MP for Ga Rural.
- Akim Abuakwa West constituency (Kade-Akwatia) - 1964 - Michael Reynolds Darku-Sarkwa died in 1964 and was replaced by Kwesi Amoako-Atta who stood for the seat unopposed on the ticket of the CPP.

== See also ==
- Parliament of Ghana
- 1956 Gold Coast legislative election
