= List of MPs elected in the 1965 Ghanaian parliamentary election =

Colonial Era
1951 Assembly	(election)
1954 Assembly	(election)
1956 Assembly	(election)
First Republic
1957 Parliament	(election)
1965 Parliament	(election)
Second Republic
1969 Parliament	(election)
Third Republic
1979 Parliament	(election)
Fourth Republic
1st Parliament	(1992)
2nd Parliament	(1996)
3rd Parliament	(2000)
4th Parliament	(2004)
5th Parliament	(2008)
6th Parliament	(2012)
7th Parliament	(2016)
8th Parliament	(2020)
9th Parliament	(2024)

This is a list of members of parliament appointed to represent the various constituencies of Ghana in 1965.

== Composition ==
In 1964 a constitutional amendment was passed by the CPP majority in parliament to make the country a One-party state. All members of the 1965 parliament therefore belonged to one political party; the Convention People's Party. Additional constituencies were created compared to the previous parliament and 10 females were appointed to parliament by the President. All were members of the Convention Peoples Party.

Affiliation	Members
Convention People's Party (PP)	198
Total	198

== List of MPs elected in the general election ==
The following table is a list of MPs elected in 1965, ordered by constituency.

=== Elected members ===
Constituency	Elected MP	Elected Party	Comment	Previous MP	Previous Party
Abetifi	Benjamin Kofi Asamoah	CPP			
Abirem	Kwamena Tuffuor Ampem	CPP			
Ablekuma	Sophia Doku (formerly Eastern Region MP)	CPP			
Abura	Joseph Essilfie Hagan	CPP		Joseph Essilfie Hagan (Abura Asebu)	CPP
Ada	Andrews Kwabla Puplampu	CPP		Andrews Kwabla Puplampu (Ada)	
Adansi	John Young Ghann	CPP		John Young Ghann (Adansi Banka)	CPP
Adeiso	Kwasi Sintim Aboagye	CPP		Kwasi Sintim Aboagye (Akim Abuakwa)	CPP
Adidome	Ferdinand Koblavi Dra Goka	CPP		Ferdinand Koblavi Dra Goka (Central Tongu)	CPP
Adaagya	Edward Kojo Duncan-Williams	CPP			
Adotobri	Samuel Antwi Kwaku Bonsu	CPP			
Afadzato	David Kwaku Ziga	CPP			
Afigya-Kwabre	Yaw Konadu	CPP			
Afram	Erasmus Isaac Preko	CPP		Erasmus Isaac Preko	CPP
Agona	Martin Kyerematen	CPP			
Agona Nsaba	Swinthin Maxwell Arko	CPP			
Ahafo Ano	John Kwasi Appiah	CPP			
Ahantah	A. E. Inkumsah	CPP		A. E. Inkumsah (Ahanta Shama)	CPP
Ajumako	Anthony Seibu Alec Abban	CPP		Anthony Seibu Alec Abban (Ajumako Asikuma)	CPP
Akan Bowiri	Theodore Obo Asare Jnr	CPP			
Akan Wawa	Kojo Obed Amoako-Prempeh	CPP			
Akim Manso	Kofi Agyare	CPP			
Akrokerri Dompoase	Kwasi Nsarkoh	CPP			
Akropong	Kingsley Asiam	CPP		Kingsley Asiam (Akwapim South)	CPP
Akuapem Mampong	Andrew Yao Kwasi Djin	CPP			
Akwamu	Michael Paul Ansah	CPP			
Akyim Tafo	Bartholomew Ebassuah Kwaw-Swanzy	CPP			
Akyimpim	Mark Kwami Hayford	CPP			
Amanano	Margaret Ocran	CPP			
Amansie	James Kojo Obeng	CPP			
Anlo	Cornelius Dartey Tay	CPP			
Aowin	Kwamina Egyir Asaam	CPP		P. K. K. Quaidoo (Amenfi-Aowin)	CPP
Asamankese	Margaret Selina Martei	CPP			
Asankragua	James Kwame Twum	CPP		James Kwame Twum	CPP
Asante Mampong	Comfort Asamoah	CPP		Comfort Asamoah (Ashanti Region)	CPP
Ashanti Akim	Serwaa Annin	CPP		Charles de Graft Dickson	CPP
Asebu	Edward Benjamin Kwesi Ampah Jnr	CPP		Joseph Essilfie Hagan (Abura Asebu)	CPP
Asesewa	Kofi Batsa	CPP			
Ashiedu Keteke	Emmanuel Kwamina Crentsil	CPP	Nkrumah became President	Kwame Nkrumah	CPP
Asikuma	Kodwo Sam Annan	CPP		Anthony Seibu Alec Abban (Ajumako Asikuma)	CPP
Asin-Apimanim	James Alfred Kwesi Dougan	CPP			
Asokwa	Osei Owusu Afriyie	CPP		Osei Owusu Afriyie	CPP
Assin-Atandaso	Daniel Buadi	CPP			
Asutifi	Edward Kwadwo Twumasi	CPP			
Atebubu	William Ntoso	CPP			
Ateiku	Kodwo Addison	CPP			
Avenor	Nelson Kwami Maglo	CPP		Nelson Kwami Maglo	CPP
Awutu-Senya	N. A. Welbeck	CPP		N. A. Welbeck (Awutu Senya)	CPP
Axim	Isaac Abraham Amihere	CPP			
Ayawaso	Kweku Akwei	CPP			
Bantama	Sulemanu Kwame Tandoh	CPP			
Battor	Stephen Allen Dzirasa	CPP		Stephen Allen Dzirasa	CPP
Bawku	Baba Ayagiba	CPP		Baba Ayagiba	CPP
Bechem	Lucy Anin	CPP		Lucy Anin (Brong-Ahafo Region)	CPP
Begoro	Kofi Asante Ofori-Atta	CPP		Kofi Asante Ofori-Atta (Akim Abuakwa Central)	CPP
Bekwai	Joseph Dawson Wireko	CPP			
Berekum	Isaac William Benneh	CPP		Isaac William Benneh	CPP
Biakoye	Sylvanus Desmond Magnus-George	CPP			
Bimbilla	Nantogma Atta	CPP			
Birimagya	Victoria Tagoe	CPP			
Bole	Emmanuel Adama Mahama	CPP		Emmanuel Adama Mahama (Gonja West)	CPP
Bolgatanga	Ferdinand Anthony Chanayireh	CPP			
Bongo	William Atia Amoro	CPP		William Atia Amoro	CPP
Bosomtwe	John Kwaku Bonsu	CPP			
Buem	Eric Kwame Heymann	CPP		Francis Yao Asare	CPP
Chereponi	Rowland Isifu Alhasan	CPP			
Chiana	Agnes Tahiru	CPP			
Dangbe	Edward Ago-Ackam	CPP		Edward Ago-Ackam (Dangbe-Shai)	CPP
Dayi	Martin Theodore Djan	CPP			
Denkyimanfu	Ekow Daniels	CPP			
Denkyira	Kobina Hagan	CPP		F. E. Tachie-Menson	CPP
Dompim	Joseph Ampah Kojo Essel	CPP			
Dormaa	Stephen Willie Yeboah	CPP		Stephen Willie Yeboah	CPP
Dormaa-Drobo	Nicholas Anane-Agyei	CPP			
Duayaw-Nkwanta	Joseph Kingsley Baffour-Senkyire	CPP			
Dutasor	Kofi Kra Kpatakpa	CPP			
Dzodze	Charles Ahiadzro Adzofia	CPP		Charles Ahiadzro Adzofia (Dzodze East)	CPP
Edina-Eguafo	Francis Edward Techie-Menson	CPP		Francis Edward Techie-Menson (Denkyria)	CPP
Effutu	Alfred Jonas Dowuona-Hammond	CPP		Alfred Jonas Dowuona-Hammond (Awutu)	CPP
Ekumfi	Kwaku Boateng	CPP		Kwaku Boateng (Ekumfi Enyan)	CPP
Enyan-Breman	Alex Quaison-Sackey	CPP		Kwaku Boateng (Ekumfi Enyan)	CPP
Funsi	Bukuli Bakubie	CPP			
Ga	Paul Teiko Tagoe	CPP		Paul Teiko Tagoe	CPP
Gamashie	Henry Sonnie Torgbor Provencal	CPP			
Garu	Jambaidu Awuni	CPP		Jambaidu Awuni (Kusasi Central)	CPP
Gbi	Frank Kwami Tsaku	CPP			
Goaso	Solomon Kwame Opoku	CPP			
Gomoa	Grace Ayensu	CPP		Grace Ayensu (Western Region)	CPP
Gomoa-Ajumako	Kojo Botsio	CPP		Kojo Botsio	CPP
Gomoa-Asin	Thomas Dominic Baffoe	CPP			
Guan	Paul Edward Affum Okwabi	CPP			
Gushiegu	Sulemana Ibun Iddrissu	CPP		Sulemana Ibun Iddrissu (Dagomba North)	CPP
Ho	Emmanuel Yaw Attigah	CPP		Emmanuel Yaw Attigah (Ho East)	CPP
Jaman	Saarrah Adu-Gyamfi	CPP			
Jirapa	Robert Gbari-Gariba	CPP			
Jomoro	John Benibengor-Blay	CPP		John Benibengor-Blay (Western Nzima)	CPP
Juabeng	Sarpong Kumankuma	CPP		Issac Boaten Asafu-Adjaye (Juaben-Edweso)	UP
Juabeso-Bia	Kwaw Ampah	CPP			
Juaso-Bankaman	Stephen Agyei Owusu-Ansah	CPP			
Kade	Kwesi Amoako-Atta	CPP		Kwesi Amoako-Atta {Akim Abuakwa West)	CPP
Keta	Christian Kobla Dovlo	CPP			
Kibi	Kwesi-Ghapson	CPP			
Kintampo	Victoria Nyame	CPP			
Klotey Tenashie	Ehi Wonyanolo Dowuona	CPP			
Koforidua	Michael Osae Kwatia	CPP			
Komenda Abriem	Kobina Orleans Thompson	CPP			
Konongo-Odumasi	Osei Kojo Fori	CPP			
Kpandai	Gilbert Takora Dramanu	CPP			
Kpando	Regina Asamany (Volta Region)	CPP			
Kpasempke	Mahama Nantogmah	CPP			
Kpeshie	Ebenezer George Tanti	CPP			
Krachi	Joseph Kodzo	CPP		Joseph Kodzo (Akan Krachi)	CPP
Kraboa-Coaltar	Theodore Kofi Danso	CPP			
Kukuom	Baffour Kwabena Senkyire	CPP			
Kusamongo	Samuel Seidu Sakara	CPP			
Kusanaba	Ayeebo Asumda	CPP		Ayeebo Asumda (Kusasi West)	CPP
Kwabeng	Samuel Osabutey Tetteh	CPP			
Kwabre	Joseph Mainoo	CPP			
Kwame Danso	Wilfred Yawo Nyami	CPP			
Kwanwoma	Isaac Joseph Adomako-Mensah	CPP		Isaac Joseph Adomako-Mensah (Atwima Amansie)	CPP
Lambussie	William Namebi	CPP			
Lawra	William Gangmir Wononuo	CPP		Abayifaa Karbo (Lawra Nandom)	UP
Manhyia	Daniel Emmanuel Asafo-Agyei	CPP		Daniel Emmanuel Asafo-Agyei; Kumasi North	CPP
Manso	Kofi Badu	CPP			
Mfantsiman	Kofi Baako	CPP		Kofi Baako (formerly Saltpond)	CPP
Mponua	Martin Appiah Danquah	CPP			
Mpraeso	Ofosu Henebeng	CPP			
Nabdam	Tubrow Kapeon Yentu	CPP		Tubrow Kapeon Yentu (Frafra East)	CPP
Nandom	Chemogoh Yabepeni Deri	CPP		Abayifaa Karbo (Lawra Nandom)	UP
Nanton	Susanna Al-Hassan	CPP		Susanna Al-Hassan (Northern Region)	CPP
Nalerigu	Mumuni Bawumia	CPP		Mumuni Bawumia (South Mamprusi East)	CPP
Navrongo	Lawrence Rosario Abavana	CPP		Lawrence Rosario Abavana (Kassena-Nankani South)	CPP
Nkawkaw	Daniel Ernest Mensah	CPP			
Nkoransa	George Obeng Boateng	CPP			
Nkroful	Isaac Kwadwo Chinebuah	CPP			
Nkwanta	Anthony Berkolai Quartey	CPP			
Nkwatia	Samuel Kofi Ntiamoah	CPP			
Nsuta-Kwamang	Atta Mensah	CPP			
Nsawam-Aburi	Lily Appiah	CPP			
Nwabiagya	Ernest Moses Opoku	CPP		Benjamin Freeman Kusi (Atwima Nwabiagya)	UP
Obuasi	Robert Okyere Amoako-Atta	CPP		Robert Okyere Amoako-Atta	CPP
Oda	Albert Kwame Onwona-Agyemang	CPP			
Odumase	Abraham Mate Johnson	CPP			
Offinso	Joseph Abrensu Owusu-Ansah	CPP			
Oguaa	Kojo Abraham	CPP		Nathaniel Azarco Welbeck	CPP
Okaikwei	Robert Mensah Abbey	CPP		Robert Mensah Abbey (Accra West)	CPP
Osudoku	Edmund Nee Ocansey	CPP			
Paga	Clement Kubindiwo Tedam	CPP		Clement Kubindiwo Tedam (Kassena-Nankanni North)	CPP
Prestea	Samuel Emanful Arkah	CPP		Samuel Emanful Arkah (Wassaw Central)	CPP
Pusiga	Cecelia Anayori Bukari-Yakubu	CPP			
Saboba	Joseph Henry Allassani	CPP		Joseph Henry Allassani (Dagomba East)	CPP
Salaga	Joseph Adam Braimah	CPP		Joseph Adam Braimah (Gonja East, Yeji and Prang)	
Sandema	Akantigsi Afoko	CPP		Akantigsi Afoko (Builsa)	CPP
Savelugu	Salifu Yakubu	CPP			
Sefwi-Bibiani	James Kodjoe Essien	CPP		James Kodjoe Essien (Bibiani)	CPP
Sekondi	John Arthur	CPP		John Arthur (Sekondi-Takoradi)	CPP
Sekyere	Krobo Edusei	CPP		Krobo Edusei (Sekyere East)	CPP
Sekesua	Emmanuel Narh Korley	CPP			
Shai	Emmanuel Adotei Maclean	CPP		Edward Ago-Ackam (Dangbe Shai)	CPP
Shama	Christiana Wilmot	CPP		Ashford Emmanuel Inkumsah (Ahanta-Shama)	CPP
Sogakofe	Benjamin Alphonsus Konu	CPP		Benjamin Alphonsus Konu (South Tongu)	CPP
Somanya	Emmanuel Humphrey Tettey Korboe	CPP		Emmanuel Humphrey Tettey Korboe (Yilo Krobo)	CPP
Some-Aflao	John K. Tettegah	CPP			
Subin	Mohammed Babaley Sulemana	CPP			
Swedru-Achease	Mary Winfred Koranteng	CPP		Mary Winfred Koranteng (Eastern Region)	CPP
Suhum	Kwaku Amoa-Awuah	CPP		Kwaku Amoa-Awuah (Abuakwa East)	CPP
Sunyani	Kyere Awua Gyan	CPP			
Swedru	Emmanuel Kobla Bensah	CPP		Emmanuel Kobla Bensah (Agona Swedru)	CPP
Takoradi	Kwesi Armah	CPP			
Tamale	Ebenezer Adam	CPP			
Tan-Banda	Paul Acheampong Cofie Atuahene	CPP			
Tarkwa-Aboso	Timothy Ansah	CPP			
Techiman	Christopher Samuel Takyi	CPP			
Tema	Zuberu Baba Shardow	CPP			
Tempane	Bukari Yakubu	CPP			
Teppa	Robert Nuaku Baffour-Awuah	CPP			
Tolon	Yakubu Tali (Tolon-Na)	CPP		Yakubu Tali (Tolon-Na) (Dangomba South)	CPP
Tongo	David Dogbilla Balagumyetime	CPP			
Tumu	Imoru Egala	CPP		Imoru Egala	CPP
Wala	Mumuni Adams	CPP			
Walewale	Mahama Tampurie	CPP			
Wassaw-Akropong	William Kwabena Aduhene	CPP		William Kwabena Aduhene (Sefwi Wiawso)	CPP
Wego	Paulina Senanu	CPP			
Wenchi	Charles Ebenezer Donkoh	CPP			
Wechiau	Seidu Hamidu	CPP			
Wheta	Kweku Hewlett	CPP			
Wiaso	Benjamin Annan Bentum	CPP			
Yeapra	James Emmanuel Kwaku Tawiah	CPP			
Yendi	Ramatu Baba	CPP			
Yiloyono	Andrews Tetteh Amakwata	CPP			
Yingor	Hans Kofi Boni	CPP			
Zabsugu	Alfred Torponee-Cobla	CPP			
Zebila	Awani Akuguri	CPP			
Bunkpurugu	De Liman Issahaku	CPP			
Asakoduase	Dua Winifred	CPP			
Nyakrom-Nkum	Essibrah William Amuah Cadman	CPP			
Ejisu	Jantuah Francis Adubobi	CPP			
Nadawli	Kaleo Jatoe	CPP			
Ejura-Sekyidumase	Jantuah, Kwame Sanaa-Poku	CPP			

== See also ==
- Parliament of Ghana
- 1964 Ghanaian constitutional referendum
- 1965 Ghanaian parliamentary election
