= Appiah =

Appiah is a surname. It is the fifth common surname in Ghana. Notable people with the surname include:

- Abena Appiah (born 1993), Ghanaian–American singer, model and beauty queen
- Dennis Appiah (born 1992), French footballer
- Dorcas Coker-Appiah (born 1946), Ghanaian lawyer and women's rights activist
- Ernest Appiah Nuamah (born 2003), Ghanaian footballer
- Keenan Appiah-Forson (born 2001), British footballer
- Jackie Aygemang (born 1983), Ghanaian actress, known as Jackie Appiah
- James Kwesi Appiah (born 1960), Ghanaian footballer and manager
- Joe Appiah (1918–1990), Ghanaian lawyer and politician
- John Kwasi Appiah, Ghanaian politician; member of parliament during the first republic
- Kwabena Appiah (born 1992), New Zealand footballer
- Kwame Anthony Appiah (born 1954), Ghanaian–British–American philosopher, son of Joe
- Kwesi Appiah (born 1990), English footballer
- Lily Appiah, Ghanaian politician; member of parliament during the first republic
- Ofosu Appiah (born 1989), Ghanaian footballer
- Peggy Appiah (1921–2006), British writer
- Peter Kodwo Appiah Turkson (born 1948), Ghanaian Catholic cardinal, and president of the Pontifical Council for Justice and Peace
- Stephen Appiah (born 1980), Ghanaian footballer
- Simon Appiah Asamoah (born 2002), Ghanaian footballer
