= Bonsu =

Bonsu is a surname. Notable people with the surname include:

- Mensa Bonsu (died 1896), Asantehene
- Nana Osei Bonsu II (born 1939), Regent of the Ashanti Kingdom
- Osei Bonsu (died 1824), Asantehene
- Osei Kyei Mensah Bonsu (born 1957), Ghanaian urban planner and politician
- Pops Mensah-Bonsu (born 1983), British basketball executive and former player
- Randy Edwini-Bonsu (born 1990), Ghanaian-born Canadian soccer player
- Solomon Antwi Kwaku Bonsu (born 1921), Ghanaian politician
- Jackson Osei Bonsu, better known as Sugar Jackson (born 1981), Belgian boxer
