= Ampem =

Ampem is a surname. Notable people with the surname include:

- Davidson Drobo-Ampem (born 1988), German professional footballer
- Nana Yaw Ampem Darko (or George Darko) (born 1951), Ghanaian musician
- Kwamena Tuffuor Ampem, Ghanaian politician
- Prince Obeng Ampem (born 1998), Ghanaian footballer
