= Gyamfi =

Gyamfi is a Ghanaian name that may refer to the following notable people:

Given name

- Gyamfi Kyeremeh (born 1995), Belgian football winger

Surname

- Bright Gyamfi (born 1996), Ghanaian football defender
- Charles Gyamfi (born 1929), Ghanaian footballer and manager
- Emmanuel Gyamfi (born 1994), Ghanaian football winger
- Emmanuel Gyamfi (born 2004), German football midfielder
- Emmanuel Akwasi Gyamfi, Ghanaian politician
- Frank Sarfo-Gyamfi (born 1994), Ghanaian football winger
- Isaac Gyamfi (born 2000), Ghanaian football midfielder
- Maxwell Gyamfi (born 2000), German football defender
- Mercy Adu-Gyamfi (born 1971), Ghanaian politician
- Poku Adu-Gyamfi, Ghanaian politician
- Saarrah Adu-Gyamfi, Ghanaian politician
- Sammy Gyamfi (born 1989), Ghanaian lawyer and politician
- Samuel Adu Gyamfi, Ghanaian politician and an educationalist
- Sarfo Gyamfi (born 1967), Ghanaian football player

== See also ==
- Adu Gyamfi Senior High School
