= Anthony Seibu Alec Abban =

Ghanaian politician

Member of the Ghana Parliament for Ajumako
- In office 1965–1966
- Preceded by: New
- Succeeded by: Constituency merged

Member of the Ghana Parliament for Ajumako-Asikuma
- In office 1954–1965
- Preceded by: Constituency split

Personal details
- Born: Anthony Seibu Alec Abban; 4 June 1928 Gold Coast
- Died: 2 October 1985 (aged 57)
- Party: Convention People's Party; People's National Party
- Education: Mfantsipim School; Wesley College, Kumasi
- Profession: Teacher

Anthony Seibu Alec Abban was a Ghanaian teacher and politician. He was member of parliament in the first republic. He first served as a member of parliament for Ajumako-Asikuma electoral district from 1954 to 1965. In 1965 the constituency was split and he served as the member of parliament representing the Ajumako electoral area. He was also deputy minister in various portfolios in the first republic. In the third republic, he was a member of the People's National Party, the party that won the 1979 general election. Abban was a trained teacher. Prior to politics, he taught in various schools in the then Gold Coast.

== Early life and education ==
Abban was born on 4 June 1928. He had his early education at the Ajumako Methodist School. He continued at Mfantsipim School where he passed his London Matriculation Examination in 1948. He went on to Wesley College, Kumasi where he obtained his Teacher's Certificate 'A'.

== Career and politics ==
Prior to politics Abban taught in schools at Winneba and Odoben all in the Central Region of Ghana. In 1954 Abban was elected as a member of the Legislative Assembly for Ajumako-Asikuma. While in parliament he served as deputy minister for various ministries, some of which include the Ministry of Industry, and the Ministry of Agriculture. In 1965 he became a member of parliament for Ajumako when his constituency was split. He served in this capacity until 1966 when the Nkrumah government was overthrow.

During the Third Republic, Abban joined the People's National Party and was one of the party's top bureaucrats.

== Death ==
Abban died on 2 October 1985, aged 57.

== See also ==
- List of MLAs elected in the 1954 Gold Coast legislative election
- List of MLAs elected in the 1956 Gold Coast legislative election
- List of MPs elected in the 1965 Ghanaian parliamentary election
