= Francis Edward Techie-Menson =

Ghanaian politician (born 1910)

Francis Edward Tachie-Menson

Minister for Housing
- In office 1 February 1965 – 24 February 1966
- President: Dr. Kwame Nkrumah
- Preceded by: Emmanuel Kobla Bensah (Minister for Works and Housing)
- Succeeded by: Issifu Ali (Commissioner for Works and Housing)

Member of Parliament for Edina-Eguafo
- In office 1965 – 24 February 1966
- Preceded by: New
- Succeeded by: Constituency merged

Member of Parliament for Denkyira
- In office 1954–1965
- Preceded by: Constituency merged
- Succeeded by: Kobina Hagan

Personal details
- Born: Francis Edward Tachie-Menson; 19 August 1910 Elmina, Central Region, Gold Coast
- Citizenship: Ghanaian
- Party: Convention People's Party
- Education: City and Guilds of London Institute; University of Wisconsin–Madison; Ghana Senior High Technical School, Takoradi

Francis Edward Tachie-Menson was a Ghanaian politician. He served as a Deputy Minister, Chairman of the Ghana Housing Corporation, a member of parliament, and a state minister in the first republic. He was the member of parliament for the Denkyira constituency from 1954 to 1965 and the member of parliament for the Edina-Eguafo constituency from 1965 to 1966. He also served as Ghana's Minister for Housing from 1965 to 1966.

== Early life and education ==
Tachie-Menson was born on 19 August 1910 at Elmina in the Central Region of Ghana (then Gold Coast). He obtained a certificate in Automobile Engineering (Mechanical Engineering) from the City and Guilds of London Institute. He later earned a certificate of Competency in Workers' Education (Trade Unionism) and Leadership from the University of Wisconsin–Madison. After teaching for a while, he entered the Government Technical School (now Ghana Senior High Technical School, Takoradi) in March, 1931 completing his course in April, 1934.

== Career ==
Tachie-Menson begun as a pupil teacher at the Roman Catholic School in Bekwai. After teaching for a year, he entered the Government Technical School to complete a 3-year course after which he joined the Department of Posts and Telegraphs in Accra as a linesman on 8 May 1934. On 24 January 1939, he was promoted to the rank of a 2nd grade sub inspector and in 1953 while working in that capacity, he was elected president of the Gold Coast Trades Union Congress (GCTUC). He remained in this position until his resignation on 30 June 1954.

== Politics ==
In June 1954, Tachie-Menson was elected to represent the Denkyira constituency on the ticket of the Convention People's Party (CPP). While serving in parliament, he was appointed Parliamentary Secretary (Deputy Minister) to the Ministry of Defence in 1958. He served in this capacity until he was relieved of his duties as a Deputy Minister on 1 April 1961. In February 1963, he became the Chairman of the Housing Corporation and on 1 February 1965 he was made Minister of Housing. That same year, he became the member of parliament for the Edina-Eguafo constituency. Tachie-Menson held these appointments until the overthrow of the Nkrumah government on 24 February 1966.

== Personal life ==
Tachie-Menson loved to listen to music and engage in sporting activities in his leisure time.

== See also ==
- List of MLAs elected in the 1954 Gold Coast legislative election
- List of MLAs elected in the 1956 Gold Coast legislative election
- List of MPs elected in the 1965 Ghanaian parliamentary election
