= Ocansey =

Ocansey is a surname. Notable people with the surname include:

- Edmund Nee Ocansey (1913–?), Ghanaian politician
- Eric Ocansey (born 1997), Ghanaian footballer
- Jacinta Ocansey, Nigerian-Ghanaian stand-up comedian, singer, and actress
