= Agyare =

Agyare is a given name and surname. Notable people with the name include:

- Agyare Koi Larbi (1949–2008), Ghanaian politician
- Alexander Agyare (born 1979), Ghanaian politician
- Benjamin Agyare (born 1994), Ghanaian footballer
- Dennis Agyare Antwi (born 1993), Ghanaian footballer
- Kofi Agyare, (1913 – after 1966), Ghanaian politician
- Regina Honu (née Agyare), Ghanaian social entrepreneur

== See also ==
- Elizabeth Ofosu-Adjare, sometimes transcribed Ofosu-Agyare
