= Amihere =

Amihere is a surname. Notable people with this name include:

- Serwaa Amihere, Ghanaian broadcast journalist and news presenter
- Kabral Blay Amihere, Ghanaian journalist and diplomat
- Isaac Abraham Amihere, Ghanaian politician.
- Jamie Amihere Moore, English professional footballer
- Laeticia Amihere, American basketball player
