= Afoko =

Afoko is a surname. Notable people with the surname include:

- Akantigsi Afoko (1923–?), Ghanaian teacher
- Paul Afoko (born 1954), Ghanaian politician
