= Kwaku Amoa-Awuah =

Ghanaian politician

Minister for Labour
- In office 1965–1966
- President: Kwame Nkrumah

Member of the Ghana Parliament for Suhum (Ghana parliament constituency)
- In office 1965–1966
- Preceded by: New
- Succeeded by: Samuel Wilberforce Awuku-Darko

Member of the Ghana Parliament for Akim Abuakwa East
- In office 1954–1965
- Preceded by: New
- Succeeded by: Constituency abolished

Personal details
- Born: Kwaku Amoa-Awuah; 14 July 1926 Larteh, Eastern Region, Gold Coast
- Died: 23 January 2015 (aged 88)
- Party: Convention People's Party

Kwaku Amoa-Awuah (14 July 1926 – 23 January 2015), also known by the name Kwaku Manu, was a Ghanaian politician in the first republic. He was the member of parliament for the Akim Abuakwa East constituency from 1954 to 1965. In 1965, he became the member of parliament representing the Suhum (Ghana parliament constituency) constituency and the Minister for Labour. Prior to his ministerial appointment, he served as deputy minister in various ministries. During the fourth republic he was made chairman of the council elders of the Convention People's Party, a post he held until December 2014.

== Early life and education ==
Amoa-Awuah was born on 14 July 1926 at Larteh-Akwapim in the Eastern Region of Ghana (then Gold Coast). His parents were then living in Suhum, and raised him there. His primary education began at the Methodist Primary School in Apedwa and continued at the Suhum Primary School. His schooling continued at the Effiduase New Juaben Middle School, and he received a Standard Seven Certificate. He had his secondary education at Trinity College, Suhum, from 1941 to 1946, and that year he obtained his Cambridge School Certificate. In 1951, he passed his London Matriculation examination through private studies. He later began legal studies at the local law school, but did not finish them.

== Career ==
Amoa-Awuah joined the staff of Trinity College after completing his secondary education there. In 1951, he was made headmaster of the school and remained in that position for about four years. In 1953, he was elected as a member of the Suhum Local Council; that same year, he formed a building firm, the Larsa Company, through partnerships with Lathi Asiedu and Godwin Manu. The firm obtained contracts from the Suhum Local Council and the Akim Abuakwa District Council.

== Politics ==
Amoa-Awuah was elected to represent the Akim Abuakwa East electoral area in the legislative assembly in June 1954. He remained a member of the assembly until the assembly was dissolved. He was re-elected in 1956 and maintained his position as a representative of the area in parliament until 1965. While in parliament, he served as deputy minister (parliamentary secretary) for various ministries, he was the deputy minister for finance from 1957 to 1960 and in November 1960 he was the parliamentary secretary at the Economic Secretariat (this Secretariat was later merged with the office of Heavy Industries). In June 1962 he was the deputy minister for Fisheries (under the Ministry of Agriculture) and in May 1964 he became the deputy minister for Health. In February 1965 he was appointed Minister for Labour, a non-cabinet ranked position, and served until February 1966 when the Nkrumah government was overthrown. Also in 1965, he was reelected to parliament, this time as the member for the Suhum constituency. During the fourth republic, he served as the chairman of the council of elders for the Convention People's Party, a post he held until December 2014, the month before his death.

== Death ==
Amoa-Awuah died on 23 January 2015; his burial was set for 6 February 2015.

== See also ==
- List of MLAs elected in the 1954 Gold Coast legislative election
- List of MLAs elected in the 1956 Gold Coast legislative election
- List of MPs elected in the 1965 Ghanaian parliamentary election
