= Margaret Selina Martei =

Ghanaian politician

Member of the Ghana Parliament for Asamankese
- In office 1965–1966
- Preceded by: New
- Succeeded by: Alexander Apeatu Aboagye da Costa

Personal details
- Born: Margaret Selina Martei Gold Coast
- Party: Convention People's Party

Margaret Selina Martei was a Ghanaian politician. She was a member of parliament for the Asamankese constituency from 1965 to 1966. She also served as the General Secretary of the National Council of Ghana Women, a council that was founded in 1960 to provide "a channel for joint consultation and joint action on a national level in social, cultural, economic and political affairs of Ghanaian womanhood." Prior to becoming the General Secretary of the National Council of Ghana Women, she worked as a protocol officer at the Social Welfare Department of Ghana.

== See also ==
- List of MPs elected in the 1965 Ghanaian parliamentary election
