= Nantogma Atta =

Ghanaian politician (born 1924)

Member of the Ghana Parliament for Bimbilla
- In office 1965–1966
- Preceded by: New
- Succeeded by: Constituency abolished

Member of the Ghana Parliament for Nanum-Dagbon
- In office 1954–1965
- Preceded by: New
- Succeeded by: Constituency abolished

Personal details
- Born: Nantogma Atta; 1924 Gold Coast
- Party: Convention People's Party

Nantogma Atta (born 1924) was a Ghanaian politician during the first republic. He was a member of parliament for the Nanum Dagbon constituency from 1954 to 1965. In 1965, he became the member of parliament for the Bimbilla constituency. While in parliament, he served as the deputy minister for defence.

== Early life and education ==
Atta was born in 1924. He was educated at Presbyterian Mission School in Kpando. He later took a commercial course in Agona Swedru obtaining his diploma in 1950.

== Career and politics ==
Atta worked for a while at the Animal Health Department prior to studying his commercial course in Agona Swedru. After obtaining his diploma he was employed by the Department of Rural Water Supply. He later resigned to serve as the state secretary for Nanumba and clerk of the Bimbilla Local Council, a position he held from 1950 until 1954 when he entered parliament.

In 1954 he entered parliament representing the Nanum Dagbon electoral area on the ticket of the Convention People's Party (CPP). He served in parliament until 1956 when parliament was dissolved. Prior to the resumption of parliament in 1956, he was nominated once more by the CPP to represent the Nanum Dagbon electoral area. During the 1956 parliamentary elections, he was re-elected to serve the Nanum Dagbon electoral area in parliament. He served in that capacity until 1965 when he became the member of parliament for the Bimbilla constituency. While in parliament he was appointed deputy minister for defence. He remained in parliament until 1966 when the Nkrumah government was overthrown.

== See also ==
- List of MLAs elected in the 1954 Gold Coast legislative election
- List of MLAs elected in the 1956 Gold Coast legislative election
- List of MPs elected in the 1965 Ghanaian parliamentary election
