= Kwasi Sintim Aboagye =

Ghanaian teacher and politician

Member of the Ghana Parliament for Adeiso
- In office 1965–1966
- Preceded by: New
- Succeeded by: Constituency abolished

Member of the Ghana Parliament for Akim Abuakwa South
- In office 1954–1965
- Succeeded by: Constituency abolished

Personal details
- Born: Kwasi Sintim Aboagye; 20 November 1919 Asamankese, Gold Coast
- Party: Convention People's Party
- Education: Presbyterian Training College
- Profession: Teacher

Kwasi Sintim Aboagye (20 November 1919 – unknown) was a Ghanaian politician. He served as member of parliament for the Akim Abuakwa South electoral district from 1954 to 1965. In 1965 he became the member of parliament for Adeiso until February 1966 when the Nkrumah government was overthrown. While in parliament he served as chairman of the bureau for Ghana languages.

== Early life and education ==
Aboagye was born on 20 November 1919 at Asamankese in the Eastern Region of Ghana (then Gold Coast). He was educated at the Asamankese Presbyterian Primary School from 1927 to 1932. He later moved to the Aburi Presbyterian Boarding School and completed his elementary education in 1937. He entered the Presbyterian Training College at Akropong where he trained as a teacher and obtained his teachers' Certificate 'A' in 1941. He stayed one more year at the college to study theology. He left the college in 1942.

== Career ==
After his studies in college, Aboagye worked as a teacher at Agogo Presbyterian Primary School in the Ashanti Region. In 1945 he was transferred to Akim Oda to work as a Head teacher. He worked at Akim Oda until 1947 when he was transferred to Agona Nsaba. In 1948 he gave up teaching and traded in hand-bags and travelling bags. He stayed in the business until 1951 when he became a contractor supplying boards and scantlings. He remained in this business until 1954 when he entered parliament.

== Politics ==
Aboagye was elected into the legislative assembly in 1954 to represent the Akim Abuakwa South electoral district. He served as a member of parliament for the area until 1965. In 1965 he became the member of parliament representing the Adeiso electoral area. He remained a member of parliament until February 1966 when the Nkrumah government was ousted.

== Personal life ==
Aboagye married Adwoa Nyamekye in 1946 and had three children with her. In 1955 he married Juliana Asare with whom he also has three children. He divorced Adwoa Nyamekye in 1959.

== See also ==
- List of MLAs elected in the 1954 Gold Coast legislative election
- List of MLAs elected in the 1956 Gold Coast legislative election
- List of MPs elected in the 1965 Ghanaian parliamentary election
