= Baba Ayagiba =

Ghanaian politician

Member of the Ghana Parliament for Bawku
- In office July 1956 – February 1966
- Preceded by: Adam Amandi
- Succeeded by: Constituency split

Personal details
- Born: Baba Ayagiba Gold Coast
- Party: Convention People's Party

Baba Ayagiba was a Ghanaian politician in the first republic. He served as a member of parliament for the Bawku constituency from 1956 to 1966 when the Nkrumah government was overthrown. He contested for the Bawku seat with Adam Amandi of the Northern People's Party who had represented the electoral area in the Legislative Assembly from 1954 to 1956.

Prior to entering parliament, Ayagiba was a public servant. He was a learner at the Agricultural Institute at Zuarungu. He qualified in 1950 and was appointed an Agricultural Assistant in the Ministry of Agriculture. He remained in this position until he entered parliament in July 1956.

== See also ==
- List of MLAs elected in the 1956 Gold Coast legislative election
- List of MPs elected in the 1965 Ghanaian parliamentary election
