= Isaac Adomako-Mensah =

Ghanaian politician (1908–1983)

Member of the Ghana Parliament for Kwanwoma
- In office 1965–1966
- Preceded by: New
- Succeeded by: Constituency abolished

Member of the Ghana Parliament for Atwima Amansie
- In office 1954–1956
- Succeeded by: Joe Appiah
- In office 1961–1965
- Preceded by: Joe Appiah
- Succeeded by: Kofi Gyenfi II

Personal details
- Born: Isaac Joseph Adomako-Mensah; 1908 Akrofuom, Assin, Ashanti Region, Gold Coast
- Died: 23 October 1983 (aged 74–75)
- Party: Convention People's Party
- Children: 13
- Education: Achimota Training College
- Profession: Teacher, politician

Isaac Joseph Adomako-Mensah (1908 - 1983) was a Ghanaian politician. He was a member of parliament for the Atwima Amansie constituency from 1954 to 1956 and from 1961 to 1965. In 1965 he became the member of parliament for the Kwanwoma constituency until 1966.

== Early life and education ==
Adomako-Mensah was born in 1908 at Akrofuom, Assin, Ashanti Region. He had his early education at St. Peter's School in Kumasi and left in 1925, after having passed the Standard Seven Examination. He continued at Achimota Training College completing his course there in 1929. He later studied and passed his London Matriculation Examination.

== Career and politics ==
Adomako-Mensah began working in 1930 as a second-class teacher. He taught from then until 1954 when he was appointed Education Secretary for the Kumasi Municipal Council. That same year he entered politics and stood for the Atwima Amansie seat on the ticket of the Convention People's Party. He won the seat in the 1954 parliamentary elections and remained member of parliament for the constituency from 15 June 1954 until 1956. He lost the 1956 parliamentary elections to Joe Appiah however when Appiah was arrested in 1961 under the Preventive Detention Act he took over his former post as the member of parliament for the Atwima Amansie constituency. In 1965, he became the member of parliament for the Kanwoma constituency. He remained in this position until the Nkrumah government was overthrown in 1966.

== Personal life ==
Adomako-Mensah and his wife Hannah had five children. He had eight more children by other women. He died on 23 October 1983.

== See also ==
- List of MLAs elected in the 1954 Gold Coast legislative election
- List of MLAs elected in the 1956 Gold Coast legislative election
- List of MPs elected in the 1965 Ghanaian parliamentary election
