= Kwamina Egyir Asaam =

Ghanaian politician

Member of the Ghana Parliament for Aowin
- In office 1965–1966
- Preceded by: New
- Succeeded by: David Kojo Duku

Personal details
- Born: Kwamina Egyir Asaam Gold Coast
- Party: Convention People's Party

Kwamina Egyir Asaam was a Ghanaian politician in the first republic. He was the member of parliament for the Aowin constituency from 1965 to 1966.

== Career ==
Prior to entering parliament, he was the Western Regional Secretary for Education for the Convention People's Party.

== See also ==
- List of MPs elected in the 1965 Ghanaian parliamentary election
