= David Kwaku Ziga =

Ghanaian politician

Member of the Ghana Parliament for Afadzato
- In office June 1965 – February 1966
- Preceded by: New
- Succeeded by: Constituency abolished

Personal details
- Born: David Kwaku Ziga. 20 April 1922 Have Etoe in the Afadzato South District, Volta Region
- Party: Convention People's Party
- Education: University of Staffordshire

David Kwaku Ziga (1922–?), was a Ghanaian politician and potter. He was a member for parliament for the Afadzato constituency from 1965 to 1966, he was also the managing proprietor of Ziga Pottery and Ceramic Works.

== Early life and education ==
Ziga was born on 20 April 1922 at Have Etoe in the Afadzato South District, Volta Region. He had his early education at Agate E. P. Primary School and the E. P. Middle School in Kpando. He later proceeded to Achimota College to study Arts and Craft from 1940 to 1944. In 1952 he won a government scholarship to study a two (2)- year pottery and ceramics programme at the North Staffordshire Technical College (now University of Staffordshire).

== Career and politics ==
Ziga was seconded to the Local Authority Middle School in Akwatia where he established a pottery and ceramic unit between 1946 and July 1948. From August 1948 to 1951 he taught at Achimota College. After his stint as a teacher at Achimota College he founded a pottery and ceramic industry at Ve Koloenu in 1951.

Ziga became the member of parliament for the Afadzato constituency from June 1965 until the Nkrumah government was overthrown in February 1966.

== Personal life ==
His hobbies included lawn tennis and social welfare. He is deceased, but details are not known.

== See also ==
- List of MPs elected in the 1965 Ghanaian parliamentary election
