= Cecelia Bukari-Yakubu =

Ghanaian politician

Member of the Ghana Parliament for Pusiga
- In office 1965–1966
- Preceded by: New
- Succeeded by: Constituency abolished

Member of the Ghana Parliament for Member for the Northern Region and Upper Region
- In office 1960–1965

Personal details
- Born: Cecelia Ayanori Bukari-Yakubu Gold Coast
- Party: Convention People's Party

Cecelia Ayanori Bukari-Yakubu was a Ghanaian politician. She was the second member of parliament representing the Northern Region and Upper Region from 1960 to 1965 and the member of parliament for Pusiga from 1965 to 1966.

Bukari-Yakubu was among the first women to enter the parliament of Ghana in 1960 under the representation of the people (women members) act. She was among the 10 women who were elected unopposed on 27 June 1960 on the ticket Convention People's Party.

== See also ==
- List of MPs elected in the 1965 Ghanaian parliamentary election
