= Kweku Akwei =

Ghanaian politician

Member of the Ghana Parliament for Ayawaso
- In office 1965–1966
- Preceded by: New
- Succeeded by: Sheik I. C. Quaye

Personal details
- Born: Isaac Lamptey Vanderpuje; 10 February 1919 Accra, Gold Coast
- Party: Convention People's Party

Kweku Akwei, also known as Isaac Lamptey Vanderpuije, (born 10 February 1919) was a Ghanaian politician. He was the member of parliament for the Ayawaso constituency from 1965 to 1966. While in parliament, he was the head of the Parliamentary Disciplinary Control Committee. Prior to entering parliament, he was the head of party education for the Convention People's Party.

== Early life and education ==
Akwei was born on 10 February 1919 in Accra. After elementary education, he studied and obtained a Fellowship Diploma of the Corporation of Certified Secretaries ( F.C.C.S.). He also studied and obtained an Intermediate qualification of the Chartered Institute of Secretaries (Inter. C.I.S.).

== Career ==
In 1937, Akwei was employed by G. W. Lamptey and Company in Accra as a typist. He worked there for a year and left to join Barclays Bank as a typist. He worked with Barclays Bank from 1938 to 1940. He was employed by Messrs. Texas Petroleum Company in Accra as a typist from 1940 to 1944. In August 1944, he moved to the Lands Department to work there as a Stenographer/Typist. He left the lands department in November 1954. In December 1954, he was engaged with the Weco Industrial Company as a Senior Accounts Clerk until March 1955. He joined the Industrial Development Corporation in April 1955 as an assistant secretary. He was later promoted to acting secretary prior to leaving the company in December 1957. In early 1958, Akwei was employed by the Agricultural Development Corporation as secretary. He worked there until he ventured politics in 1960.

== Politics ==
Akwei was appointed Secretary in charge of Education and the Anti-Corruption Bureau in July 1960. He worked in this capacity until 1966. In 1965 he became a member of parliament for the Ayawaso constituency. While in parliament, he was appointed chairman of the Parliamentary Disciplinary Control Committee. He served in these capacities until the overthrow of the Nkrumah government in February 1966.

== Personal life ==
Akwei married Mary Akwei on 7 January 1965. Prior to his marriage to Mary, Akwei had married and divorced three other women. He married Madam Zinabu Amidu in 1942 and was separated from her in 1948. He had four children with her. In 1948 Akwei married Madam Memuna Ahfa, together they had two children. They were divorced in 1959. He married Madam Cecilia Badoo in 1956 and they had two children together. They were divorced in 1964.

== See also ==
- List of MPs elected in the 1965 Ghanaian parliamentary election
