= Thomas Dominic Baffoe =

Ghanaian politician (1930–2005)

Member of the Ghana Parliament for Gomoa-Assin
- In office June 1965 – February 1966
- Preceded by: New
- Succeeded by: Constituency merged

Personal details
- Born: Thomas Dominic Baffoe; 1 November 1930 Mankesim, Central Region, Gold Coast
- Died: 14 December 2005 (aged 75)
- Party: Convention People's Party

Thomas Dominic Baffoe was a Ghanaian journalist and politician. He was the Editor-in-Chief of the Ghanaian Times from 1964 to 1965. He also served as the president of the Ghana Journalists Association in 1964. From 1965 to 1966, he was the member of parliament for the Gomoa-Assin constituency.

== Early life and education ==
Baffoe was born on 1 November 1930 at Mankesim in the Central Region of Ghana (then Gold Coast). He had his early education at the Tarkwa Catholic School from 1939 to 1941 and the Obuasi Methodist and Catholic School Leaving Certificate. Thereafter, Baffoe studied at home and took to journalism.

== Career and politics ==
Baffoe joined the Ashanti Times in Obuasi soon after leaving school in 1947 as a trainee in journalism. In 1949, he joined Jonathan Kwesi Lamptey's Gold Coast Leader in Sekondi. He moved to the Takoradi Press which was owned by Saki Scheck in 1950 and a year later left for Kumasi to become sub-editor of the Ashanti Sentinel. In 1951, towards the end of the year he was employed as a senior reporter by the Daily Graphic. In 1952 Baffoe returned to the Ashanti Times as a senior sub-editor. He remained in the firm until 1955 when he was appointed Editor of the India Newspaper.

Baffoe served as public officer from 1958 to 1960 and became the editor of the Ghanaian Worker of the Trades Union Congress. He was appointed Editor of the Ghanaian Times in April 1960 and was dismissed in 1961 for a period of two weeks. That same year, he was appointed member of the Central Committee of the Convention People's Party (CPP), being the youngest member of the committee at the time. In May 1964 he became the Editor-in-Chief of the Ghanaian Times until 1965. In that same year, he served as the president of the Ghana Journalists Association. In 1965 he reverted to the post of editor of the paper. He remained in this post as Editor-in-Chief until 24 February 1966 when the Nkrumah government was overthrown. In June 1965 he doubled as the member of parliament for the Gomoa-Asin constituency. He remained in parliament until the 1966 overthrow. In his later life, he once served as a member of the board of directors of the Ghanaian Times.

== Personal life ==
Baffoe married Miss Josephine Ashorkor Vejisu, now Mrs. Josephine Baffoe on 18 June 1960. Mrs. Josephine Baffoe had two other children prior to the marriage. He died on Wednesday 14 February 2005.

== See also ==
- List of MPs elected in the 1965 Ghanaian parliamentary election
