= Robert Mensah Abbey =

Ghanaian politician

Robert Abbey

Member of the Ghana Parliament for Okaikwei
- In office 1965–1966
- Preceded by: New
- Succeeded by: Carl Daniel Reindorf

Member of the Ghana Parliament for Accra West
- In office 1956–1965
- Succeeded by: Constituency abolished

Personal details
- Born: Robert Mensah Abbey Gold Coast
- Party: Convention People's
- Children: Joseph
- Profession: boxer

Robert Mensah Abbey (fl. 1956–1966) was a Ghanaian boxer and politician. Before politics, Abbey was a professional boxer and later clerk who worked in Accra. Abbey was nominated by the Convention People's Party to contest for the Accra West seat in the 1956 Gold Coast legislative election in place of Thomas Hutton-Mills who had been appointed deputy commissioner of the Gold Coast. He won the seat and served as a member of parliament for Accra West from 1956 to 1965. In 1965 he became the member of parliament representing the Okaikwei electoral district. Abbey was the father of J. L. S. Abbey the former Ghanaian public servant and ambassador.

== See also ==
- List of MLAs elected in the 1956 Gold Coast legislative election
- List of MPs elected in the 1965 Ghanaian parliamentary election
