= Mumuni Adams =

Ghanaian politician

Member of the Ghana Parliament for Wala
- In office 1965–1966
- Preceded by: New
- Succeeded by: Constituency abolished

Personal details
- Born: 1907 Wa, Upper Region, Gold Coast
- Party: Convention People's Party

Mumuni Adams was a Ghanaian politician. He was the member of parliament for the Wala constituency from 1965 to 1966.

== Biography ==
Adams was born in 1907 at Wa, the capital of the Upper West Region of Ghana. He was educated at the Wa Government School where he studied from 1917 to 1925.

After he studies at the Wa Government School, he became a political administration road overseer. In 1928, he became a court registrar and interpreter. He worked in this capacity until 1954 when he joined the department of Social Welfare and Community. A year later, he moved to the Agricultural Development Corporation. He worked at the corporation from 1955 until 1959 when he joined the Cocoa division of the Agricultural Department. In June 1965 he became the member of parliament for the Wala constituency. His hobby was reading.

== See also ==
- List of MPs elected in the 1965 Ghanaian parliamentary election
