= Erasmus Isaac Preko =

Ghanaian politician

Minister of Fuel and Power
- In office June 1965 – February 1966
- President: Dr. Kwame Nkrumah
- Preceded by: New
- Succeeded by: Ministry abolished

Member of Parliament for Afram
- In office June 1965 – February 1966
- Preceded by: New
- Succeeded by: Benjamin Benson Ofori

Member of Parliament for Kwahu North
- In office 1954 – June 1965
- Preceded by: New
- Succeeded by: Constituency abolished

Personal details
- Born: Erasmus Isaac Kwasi Preko; 20 May 1920 Gold Coast
- Citizenship: Ghanaian
- Education: Presbyterian Boys' Senior High School

Erasmus Isaac Kwesi Preko was a Ghanaian politician. He was a minister of state and a member of parliament during the first republic. He was the Minister of Fuel and Power from 1965 to 1966, the member of parliament for the Kwahu North constituency from 1954 to 1965, and later the member of parliament for the Afram constituency from 1965 to 1966.

== Early life and education ==
Preko was born on 20 May 1920 at Osiem, Akim Abuakwa in the Eastern Region of Ghana. His parents hailed from Abetifi in the Kwahu District but were then residents of Akim Abuakwa.

He began his early education at the Abetifi Presbyterian School in 1926 and completed with his Standard Seven Certificate in 1936. Preko continued at Enoch Mensah's Commercial School in Accra where he studied from 1936 to 1939. After about a decade of work, he entered the Presbyterian Secondary School at Odumase (now Presbyterian Boys' Senior High School) on scholarship in 1948. There, he studied to obtain his Cambridge School Certificate in 1952. A year later he enrolled at the Local Government Training School, Accra and in 1954 he proceeded to the United Kingdom to study an advanced Local Government course obtaining a diploma upon graduation.

== Career ==
After completing his studies at Enoch Mensah's Commercial School in 1939, he was employed by U. T. C. in Tamale. While working as a full-time employee of the company, he worked as a licensed letter writer and indulged in petty trading. He resigned from U. T. C in 1942 and moved south to his native Kwahu. There, he gained employment as the Assistant State Secretary of the Kwahu Native Authority. During this period, he also doubled as the Native Court Registrar. In 1948 he left to study for his Cambridge School Certificate which he obtained in 1952. Preko returned to the Kwahu Local Council to serve as the Clerk of the Council following the completion of his secondary education in 1952. After serving in this capacity for two years, he left for the United Kingdom to study for his diploma. He returned in 1955.

Preko chaired various boards and committees, some of which include; the Advisory Committee on Registration and Grading of Contractors, the Ghana Nautical College, the Rail Allocation Committee, and the Central Tender Board. He also served on various boards some of which include; the Kwahu Hospital Advisory Board, the Presbyterian Secondary School (Presbyterian Boys' Senior High School) Board of Governors and the Techiman Teacher Training College Board of Governors. Preko also served as a member of the Central Tender Board from 1957 to November 1960.

== Politics ==
Preko was elected member of parliament (MP) for the Kwahu North constituency as an independent candidate while studying in the United Kingdom in 1954. He returned to Ghana (then Gold Coast) in 1955 and served in the capacity of an MP and also a parliamentary secretary until 1956 when parliament was dissolved. When parliament resumed in 1956, he was re-elected once more to represent the Kwahu North constituency, this time, on the ticket of the Convention People's Party. While in parliament, he served as the vice-chairman of the North Kwahu branch of the Convention People's Party. He also served as an Assistant Government Chief Whip, and a Ministerial Secretary in charge of the Land Secretariat while performing other duties in addition. In September 1961, he was appointed deputy minister of Construction and Communications and in June 1965 he was elevated to a non-cabinet ministerial portfolio as Minister of Fuel and Power. During that same month, he became the member of parliament for the Afram constituency. He served in these capacities until the overthrow of the Nkrumah government in February 1966.

== Personal life ==
Preko married Mrs. Agnes Preko (née Agnes Afua Animwaa) in 1939.

== See also ==
- List of MLAs elected in the 1954 Gold Coast legislative election
- List of MLAs elected in the 1956 Gold Coast legislative election
- List of MPs elected in the 1965 Ghanaian parliamentary election
