= William Atia Amoro =

Ghanaian politician

Member of the Ghana Parliament for Bongo
- In office 1954–1966
- Preceded by: New
- Succeeded by: Azabiri Ayamga

Personal details
- Born: William Atia Amoro; 1929 Bongo, Gold Coast
- Party: Convention People's Party

William Atia Amoro was a Ghanaian politician in the first republic. He was the member of parliament for the Bongo constituency from 1954 to 1966. While in parliament he served as parliamentary secretary (deputy minister) to the Ministry of Education and the Ministry of Interior.

== Early life and education ==
Amoro was born in 1929 at Bongo in the Upper East Region of Ghana ( then Gold Coast). He was educated at the Tamale Government School and the Tamale Teacher Training College.

== Career and politics ==
Amoro took up a teaching appointment in 1951 at the Nangodi Day School. He remained in the teaching profession until 1954 when he was elected as a member of the Legislative Assembly representing the Bongo electoral area. He was re-elected in 1956 and remained the member of parliament for Bongo in the subsequent years until 1966 when the Nkrumah government was overthrown. In November 1957 he was appointed parliamentary secretary (deputy minister) to the Ministry of Education and in July 1959 he became parliamentary secretary (deputy minister) to the Ministry of Interior. He served in this capacity until 1961.

== Personal life ==
Amoro's hobbies included playing table tennis, listening to music and flower gardening.

== See also ==
- List of MLAs elected in the 1954 Gold Coast legislative election
- List of MLAs elected in the 1956 Gold Coast legislative election
- List of MPs elected in the 1965 Ghanaian parliamentary election
