= Tubrow Kapeon Yentu =

Ghanaian politician

Member of Parliament for Nabdam
- In office 1965 – 24 February 1966
- Preceded by: New
- Succeeded by: Constituency merged

Member of Parliament for Frafra East
- In office 1954–1965
- Preceded by: New
- Succeeded by: Constituency abolished

Personal details
- Born: Tubrow Kapeon Yentu Gold Coast
- Citizenship: Ghanaian
- Party: Northern People's Party; United Party; Convention People's Party

Tubrow Kapeon Yentu was a Ghanaian politician. He was the member of parliament for the Frafra East constituency from 1954 to 1965 and the member of parliament for the Nabdam constituency from 1965 to 1966.

Yentu was a member of the Northern People's Party (NPP) and consequently a member of the United Party (UP) when all other parties with exception of the Convention People's Party (CPP) merged to form the United Party in 1957. He however, crossed carpets together with Mumuni Bawumia and Mahama Tampurie in 1958 to join the then ruling party; the Convention People's Party.

== See also ==
- List of MLAs elected in the 1954 Gold Coast legislative election
- List of MLAs elected in the 1956 Gold Coast legislative election
- List of MPs elected in the 1965 Ghanaian parliamentary election
