= Daniel Asafo-Agyei =

Ghanaian politician

Minister for Fisheries
- In office 1965–1966
- President: Kwame Nkrumah

Member of the Ghana Parliament for Manhyia
- In office 1965–1966
- Preceded by: New
- Succeeded by: Kwame Safo-Adu

Member of the Ghana Parliament for Kumasi North
- In office 1959–1965
- Preceded by: Cobina Kessie
- Succeeded by: Constituency abolished

Personal details
- Born: Daniel Emmanuel Asafo-Agyei; 1890 Gold Coast
- Died: 1980 (aged 89–90)
- Party: Convention People's Party
- Occupation: Merchant

Daniel Emmanuel Asafo-Agyei was a Ghanaian politician and merchant.

== Biography ==
He replaced Cobina Kessie as the member of parliament for the Kumasi North constituency in 1959 when the latter took up a diplomatic appointment as Ghana's ambassador to Liberia. Asafo-Agyei represented Kumasi North from 1959 until 1965 when he became the member of parliament for the Manhyia constituency.

While in parliament, he was appointed deputy minister for Agriculture and in 1965 he was appointed minister for Fisheries (a new ministry that had been created at the time). He served in this capacity until February 1966 when the Nkrumah government was overthrown.

== See also ==
- List of MLAs elected in the 1956 Gold Coast legislative election
- List of MPs elected in the 1965 Ghanaian parliamentary election
