= Andrews Kwabla Puplampu =

Ghanaian politician

Minister for Lands
- In office 1965 – February 1966
- President: Dr. Kwame Nkrumah

Member of Parliament for Ada
- In office June 1956 – February 1966
- Preceded by: Charles Ofoe Cludeto Amattey
- Succeeded by: Emmanuel Kabutey Narter-Olaga

Personal details
- Born: Andrews Kwabla Puplampu; 11 November 1919 Gold Coast
- Died: 3 November 1984 (aged 64)
- Citizenship: Ghanaian
- Education: Presbyterian Boys' Senior High School
- Occupation: Politician
- Profession: Lawyer; Teacher

Andrews Kwabla Puplampu (1919-1984) was a Ghanaian lawyer, politician and educationist. He was a member of parliament for the Ada constituency from 1956 to 1966. From 1960 to 1965 he doubled as the deputy minister of Foreign Affairs and from 1965 to 1966 he was the Minister for Lands. Prior to entering politics, he was a lawyer.

== Early life and education ==
Puplampu was born on 11 November 1919 in the Gold Coast. He had his secondary education at the Presbyterian Secondary School at Krobo Odumase (now Presbyterian Boys' Senior High School, Legon).

== Career ==
In 1944, Puplampu became a teacher for the Presbyterian Primary School at Big Ada. Later that year, he joined the teaching staff of the Royal Collegiate School in Accra. In April 1945 he became a second division clerk in the civil service but resigned in December 1950. He left for the United Kingdom in 1951 to study law and returned in 1954 to practise as a barrister and solicitor in Accra.

== Politics ==
Puplampu entered parliament in July 1956 to represent the Ada constituency on the ticket of the Convention People's Party. He remained in parliament until February 1966. While in parliament, he was appointed deputy minister for Foreign Affairs. He served in this capacity from 1 July 1960 to 1 February 1965 when he was appointed Minister for Lands. He remained in this post until 24 February 1966 when the Nkrumah government was overthrown.

== Death ==
He died on 3 November 1984.

== See also ==
- List of MLAs elected in the 1956 Gold Coast legislative election
- List of MPs elected in the 1965 Ghanaian parliamentary election
