= Edward Kojo Duncan-Williams =

Ghanaian politician (born 1910)

Member of the Ghana Parliament for Adaagya
- In office June 1965 – February 1966
- Preceded by: New
- Succeeded by: Constituency abolished

Personal details
- Born: Edward Kojo Duncan-Williams; 24 May 1910 Akumadan, Ashanti Region, Gold Coast
- Party: Convention People's Party
- Education: Mfantsipim School

Edward Kojo Duncan-Williams was a Ghanaian politician. He was a member for parliament for the Adaagya constituency from 1965 to 1966, he was also one of the earliest District Commissioners to be appointed in Kumasi.

== Early life and education ==
Duncan-Williams was born on 24 May 1910 at Akumadan in the Ashanti Region. He had his early education at Government Boys' Primary School in Kumasi and Atuabo in the Eastern Nzima Traditional Area of the Western Region, and his secondary education at Mfantsipim School, Cape Coast.

== Career and politics ==
Duncan-Williams was the Assistant Secretary of the Farmers' Association (later named the Cocoa Purchasing Company) in 1952. He was later appointed Supervisor for the Atwima/Nwabiagya district with the headquarters at Abuakwa. He was transferred to Sunyani and made Provisional District Manager of the Cocoa Purchasing Company.

While in Sunyani, Duncan-Williams was elected vice-chairman for the Brong Ahafo Region branch of the Convention People's Party. In 1959, he was appointed District Commissioner for the Kumasi district by the then president, Dr. Kwame Nkrumah and in 1961 he became the Regional Secretary for the Convention People's Party. In June 1965 he was made member of parliament for the Adaagya constituency. He served in this capacity until the overthrow of the Nkrumah government in February 1966.

== See also ==
- List of MPs elected in the 1965 Ghanaian parliamentary election
