= Samuel Emanful Arkah =

Ghanaian politician

Member of the Ghana Parliament for Prestea
- In office 1965–1966
- Preceded by: New
- Succeeded by: Constituency abolished

Member of the Ghana Parliament for Wassaw Central
- In office 1954–1965
- Preceded by: New
- Succeeded by: Constituency abolished

Personal details
- Born: Samuel Emanful Arkah Gold Coast
- Party: Convention People's Party

Samuel Emanful Arkah was a Ghanaian politician. He was a member of parliament for the Wassaw Central constituency from 1954 to 1965 and the member of parliament for the Prestea constituency from 1965 until 1966 when the Nkrumah government was overthrown.

== See also ==
- List of MLAs elected in the 1954 Gold Coast legislative election
- List of MLAs elected in the 1956 Gold Coast legislative election
- List of MPs elected in the 1965 Ghanaian parliamentary election
