= Paul Acheampong Cofie Atuahene =

Ghanaian politician (born 1923)

Member of the Ghana Parliament for Tan-Banda
- In office 1965–1966
- Preceded by: New
- Succeeded by: Constituency abolished

Personal details
- Born: Paul Acheampong Cofie Atuahene; 11 September 1923 Wenchi, Gold Coast
- Party: Convention People's Party
- Occupation: Politician
- Profession: Educationist

Paul Acheampong Cofie Atuahene (born 11 September 1923) was a Ghanaian politician in the first republic. He was the member of parliament for the Tan-Banda constituency from 1965 to 1966.

== Early life and education ==
Atuahene was born on 11 September 1923 at Wenchi. He trained as a teacher and qualified with a Teachers' Certificate 'A'.

== Career and politics ==
Atuahene served as the first Asa Youth Association secretary for Wenchi from 1939 to 1950. He served as the organizer and later became the secretary of the United Gold Coast Convention in Wenchi between 1946 and 1949. In 1949, he switched allegiance to the Convention People's Party (CPP) and served as the first constituency chairman for the party in the Wenchi district. He served as a national and regional executive of the party from 1955 to 1960. In 1959, he was appointed camp superintendent of the Workers Brigade in and in 1960 he became the CPP Eastern Regional organiser. In 1963, he was appointed Regional Education secretary for the CPP and in 1965 he became the member of parliament for the Tan-Banda constituency.

== See also ==
- List of MPs elected in the 1965 Ghanaian parliamentary election
