= Edmund Nee Ocansey =

Ghanaian politician

Emmanuel Nee Ocansey

Minister for Parks and Gardens
- In office 1965 – 24 February 1966
- President: Dr. Kwame Nkrumah
- Preceded by: New
- Succeeded by: Ministry abolished

Member of Parliament for Osudoku
- In office 1956 – 24 February 1966
- Preceded by: Alex Kwablah
- Succeeded by: Constituency merged

Personal details
- Born: Edmund Nee Ocansey; December 1913 Ada, Ghana, Gold Coast
- Citizenship: Ghanaian
- Party: Convention People's Party

Edmund Nee Ocansey was a Ghanaian politician. He was the member of parliament for the Osudoku constituency from 1956 to 1966.

== Biography ==
=== Early life and education ===
Ocansey was born in December 1913 at Ada, Gold Coast (now Ghana). He had his early education at Accra Royal School where he obtained his standard 7 certificate in 1935. He proceeded to Tetteh's College of Commerce where he trained as a stenographer and typist and a draughtsman surveyor.

=== Career ===
He became a building contractor and subsequently established Yesnaco Building Company with some expatriates. In 1946 he was elected chairman African Builders and Contractors Federation.

=== Politics ===
That same year, Ocansey joined the Mambii Party then later joined the United Gold Coast Convention (UGCC). In 1948, he became a member of the Convention People's Party, he formed the first youth league of the party at Adabraka and became the chairman. He was also the organiser and chairman of the motor despatch unit of CPP and purchased the first 12 motor cycles for unit at 5,760 cedis (then equivalent to £2,400) and bought the Accra Evening News press at 1,200 cedis (then £500) at a public auction and handed it back to Dr. Kwame Nkrumah. In 1952 he was elected councillor for ward 15-Adabraka. In 1953 he accompanied Nkrumah to Monrovia at the invitation of the then President of the Republic of Liberia, William Tubman. In 1954 he represented the Gold Coast at the African Administrative Town Growth Conference in Cambridge.

He was elected as a member of parliament for the Osudoku constituency in 1956 and two years later, appointed Regional Commissioner for the Eastern Region, responsible for the Ga-Adangbe segment of the Region. In 1962, he was appointed Deputy Minister for Justice and assigned responsibility of the entire administration and supervision of the Ga-Adangbe Region. He was later transferred to the Ministry of Agriculture serving as deputy minister in charge of state farms and fisheries. In 1963 he led the Government delegation to China and Korea for their independence anniversary celebrations. In February 1965 he was appointed Minister of Parks and Gardens, a new ministry that had been created by Nkrumah. Ocansey served in this capacity until 24 February 1966 when the Nkrumah government was overthrown.

== See also ==
- List of MLAs elected in the 1956 Gold Coast legislative election
- List of MPs elected in the 1965 Ghanaian parliamentary election
