= Senyo Gatror Antor =

Ghanaian politician and diplomat

- Senyo Gatrɔ Antɔ

Member of the Ghana Parliament for Kpandu North
- In office 1954–1961
- Succeeded by: Regina Asamany

Ambassador to Togo
- In office April 1970 – January 1972
- President: Edward Akufo-Addo
- Prime Minister: K. A. Busia
- Preceded by: Peter Kosi Folly
- Succeeded by: William Lix Tsitsiwu

Personal details
- Born: Logba Alakpeti, Togoland
- Died: 1986 Lomé
- Resting place: Ghana
- Party: Togoland Congress
- Other political affiliations: United Party

Senyo Gatror Antor (1913 - 1986) was a Ghanaian politician, diplomat and teacher.

== Early life and education ==
Antor was born in 1931 at Logba in the Togoland. His primary education was at the Presbyterian School at Amedzofe. He went on to the Presbyterian Teacher Training College at Akropong in the Gold Coast where he qualified as a teacher. He later attended the Presbyterian Theology College at Ho.

== Work and activism in Togoland ==
Antor worked as a teacher between 1937 and 1949. In 1949, he founded the Togoland United Nations Newsletter. He was its first editor. In 1950, he was the leader of the Togoland delegation to the United Nations Trusteeship Council (UNTC). He also led the Togoland delegation to the United Nations General Assembly in 1951, 1952, 1954 and 1956 where he petitioned for the unification of both Togolands.

== Politics ==
Antor founded the Togoland Congress in 1951 in British Togoland to advocate for its unification with French Togoland. He was opposed to the unification of Togoland with the Gold Coast. Antor actively lobbied the United Nations for the reunification of British and French Togoland. This was opposed by Pedro Olympio of the Parti togolais du progrès who opposed unification unless it was under the auspices of the French.

Following the passing of the Avoidance of Discrimination Act by the Nkrumah government in 1957, the Togoland Congress merged with other opposition parties to form the United Party.

== Detention and exile ==
Antor was arrested with F. K. Ametobra, Kojo Dumega, and Alex Odame at Alavanyo by the police in 1957 and charged with treason. He appealed to the International Court of Justice at The Hague and was released to allow him to continue as the member of parliament for Kpandu North. Between 1961 and 1966, he was detained at Nsawam Prisons until the 24 February 1966 coup which established the National Liberation Council military government.

== Diplomatic service ==
In April 1970, Antor was appointed by the Busia government as the ambassador of Ghana to Togo. He replaced Peter Kosi Folly. His term as ambassador ended when the Progress Party government of Kofi Abrefa Busia was overthrown in a coup d'étât in January 1972 by the National Redemption Council military government led by Colonel Acheampong.

== Family ==
Mr Antor's wife died around 1976, four years into his exile in Togo after the overthrow of the Busia government. His son, Robert Kwame Antor reported that the Supreme Military Council government did not allow the family to bury her remains in Ghana.

== Death ==
Antor chose to remain in exile in Togo rather than return to Ghana after the 1972 coup. He died in Lome, Togo in 1986. He was buried at Logba in the Afadzato South District of the Volta Region.
