= John Arthur (Ghanaian politician) =

Ghanaian politician (born 1915)

Regional Commissioner for the Western Region
- In office 1960–1965
- President: Dr. Kwame Nkrumah
- Preceded by: Joseph Essilfie Hagan
- Succeeded by: Stephen Willie Yeboah

Member of Parliament for Sekondi
- In office 1954 – February 1966
- President: Kwame Nkrumah
- Preceded by: Jonathan Kwesi Lamptey
- Succeeded by: Jonathan Kwesi Lamptey

Personal details
- Born: 4 February 1915 Anomabo, Central Region
- Citizenship: Ghanaian

John Arthur (born 4 February 1915, date of death unknown) was a Ghanaian politician. He served as minister of state and a member of parliament during the first republic. He was a regional commissioner (Regional Minister) for the Western Region and a member of parliament for the Sekondi electoral district.

== Early life and education ==
Arthur was born on 4 February 1915 at Anomabo in the Central Region of Ghana (then Gold Coast). He was educated at the Anomabo Wesleyan School where he obtained his Standard 7 Certificate.

== Career and politics ==
Arthur begun his career as an employee at the Union Trading Company as a clerk in 1934. He worked there for a couple of years and moved to the Central Wassaw Gold Mines. He worked there as a clerk as well. In 1937 he left and joined the Gold Coast Machinery and Trading Company at Sekondi. He worked there until 1944 when he was transferred to the United Africa Company Limited. In 1950 he participated actively in a general strike that led to his dismissal in 1950.

Arthur went into private business afterwards, acquiring a quarry from the chief of Essipong and also a lumber business. Arthur was elected a member of parliament on 15 June 1954. After his election into parliament he handed over his businesses to his cousins; he handed over the lumber business to his cousin the late W. B. Hayford and the quarry business to his cousin one Mr. Isaac Hayford. He served as a member of parliament for Sekondi electoral district until June 1956 when parliament was dissolved.

During the 1956 elections Arthur was re-elect and returned to parliament. He remained a member of parliament for Sekondi since then until February 1966 when the Nkrumah government was overthrown. In 1956 he was appointed a Parliamentary Secretary (ministerial secretary or deputy minister) and in that capacity he served in various ministries until 1960 when he was appointed Regional Commissioner for the Western Region. He held this position from 1960 until 1965 when he was moved to the Cocoa Products Corporation as its chairman.

== Personal life ==
Arthur married Madam Ekua Mensimah in 1936. Together, they had three children. Arthur married a second wife; Grace Moses with whom he had three children with as well.

== See also ==
- List of MLAs elected in the 1954 Gold Coast legislative election
- List of MLAs elected in the 1956 Gold Coast legislative election
- List of MPs elected in the 1965 Ghanaian parliamentary election
