= John Young Ghann =

Ghanaian politician

Minister for Internal Trade
- In office April 1965 – February 1966
- President: Dr. Kwame Nkrumah
- Preceded by: New
- Succeeded by: Ministry abolished

Minister for Rural Industries
- In office 1 April 1965 – April 1965
- President: Dr. Kwame Nkrumah
- Preceded by: New
- Succeeded by: Isaac William Benneh

Member of Parliament for Adansi
- In office 1965–1966
- Preceded by: Constituency merged
- Succeeded by: Stephen Nuamah Mensah

Member of Parliament for Adansi-Banka
- In office 1954–1965
- Preceded by: N. B. Abubekr
- Succeeded by: Constituency name changed

Personal details
- Born: John Young Ghann; 28 September 1922
- Citizenship: Ghanaian
- Party: Convention People's Party

John Young Ghann (born 28 September 1922) was a Ghanaian politician. He served as the Minister for Rural Industries in 1965 and the Minister for Internal Trade from 1965 to 1966. He also served as the member of parliament for the Adansi-Banka constituency from 1954 to 1965 and the member of parliament for the Adansi constituency from 1965 to 1966.

== Early life and career ==
Ghann was born on 28 September 1922. He was educated at the St. Peter's Catholic School in Kumasi.

== Career and politics ==
Ghann begun his career as a typist. He was the Treasury Clerk to the Edubiasi Native Authority. Following his resignation, he studied and qualified as a druggist.

Ghann became the first Chairman of the Edubiasi Local Council and Chairman of the Adansi-Banka District Council in 1953. A year later, he was elected member of parliament for the Adansi-Banka constituency. Prior to the 1954 parliamentary election, the seat was known as Adansi rural and was represented by N. B. Abubekr. In 1956, he was nominated once more by the Convention People's Party to run for the Adansi-Banka seat on the ticket of the party and was subsequently re-elected to represent the constituency in parliament. While in parliament, Ghann was appointed Deputy Minister for Social Welfare and later deputy minister for Information and Broadcasting. On 1 April 1965, Ghann was put in charge of the Ministry for Rural Industries, a new ministry that was created by the then president; Dr. Kwame Nkrumah. However, when Andrew Yao Kwasi Djin was removed as Minister of Trade, the ministry was divided into two; the Ministry of External Trade and the Ministry of Internal Trade and Ghann was appointed Minister of Internal Trade after less than a month serving in his previous office as Minister for Rural Industries and was replaced by Isaac William Benneh. In June 1965 he was made member of parliament for the Adansi constituency after the comstitiency name was changed from Adansi-Banka to Adansi. Ghann served as the Minister of Internal Trade from April 1965 to February 1966 and doubled as the member of parliament for the Adansi constituency from June 1965 to February 1966.

== See also ==
- List of MLAs elected in the 1954 Gold Coast legislative election
- List of MLAs elected in the 1956 Gold Coast legislative election
- List of MPs elected in the 1965 Ghanaian parliamentary election
