= Kingsley Asiam =

Ghanaian politician

Member of the Ghana Parliament for Akropong
- In office 1965–1966
- Preceded by: New
- Succeeded by: Alexander Abu Abedi

Member of the Ghana Parliament for Akwapim South
- In office 1954–1965
- Preceded by: New
- Succeeded by: Constituency abolished

Personal details
- Born: Kingsley Asiam; 1921 Gold Coast
- Died: 5 December 1982 (aged 60–61)
- Party: Convention People's Party

Kingsley Asiam (1921-1982) was a Ghanaian politician in first republic. He was the member of parliament for the Akwapim South constituency from 1954 to 1965 and the member of parliament for the Akropong constituency from 1965 to 1966. Prior to entering parliament he was the intelligence officer for the Cocoa Purchasing Company.

== Early life and education ==
Asiam was born in 1921. He was educated at the Accra Methodist School.

== Career and politics ==
Asiam begun as a cocoa contractor prior to joining the Convention People's Party in 1949. In 1951, he became the Eastern Regional Chairman of the party and later, a national executive of the party. Within that period, he doubled as an intelligence officer for the Cocoa Purchasing Company. In 1954 he was elected to represent the Akwapim South electoral area in the national assembly (parliament). He was re-elected in 1956 and remained in this position until 1965 when he became the member of parliament for the Akropong constituency. He remained in parliament until 1966 when the Nkrumah government was overthrown.

== See also ==
- List of MLAs elected in the 1954 Gold Coast legislative election
- List of MLAs elected in the 1956 Gold Coast legislative election
- List of MPs elected in the 1965 Ghanaian parliamentary election
