= T. E. Anin =

Ghanaian lawyer

Theophilus Ernest Anin is a Ghanaian lawyer, banker, financial consultant, and writer. He served as the managing director, and chairman of the board of directors of the Ghana Commercial Bank from 1972 until his retirement in August 1980.

== Early life and education ==
Anin studied at the Accra Academy and Achimota School prior to entering Selwyn College, Cambridge where he graduated with his LLB in June 1956, and his Master's degree in 1960. He trained as a lawyer and qualified in June 1959 as a Solicitor in England.

== Career ==
After he returned to Ghana, Anin worked briefly at the Lands Department of the Civil Service. In August 1960, he gained employment at the Ghana Commercial Bank as a solicitor and secretary. From 1963 until 1972, he served in various managerial capacities both in Ghana and in the United Kingdom. He was executive and chief manager (foreign) of the bank when he was appointed deputy managing director in March 1969. In 1972, he was appointed managing director of the Ghana Commercial Bank. He held this position until his retirement in August 1980.

After his retirement, Anin founded a London-Based international financial consultancy. His consultancy gained contracts from Uganda, Kenya, Zimbabwe, Malawi, The Gambia, the Republic of Panama and the Marshall Islands. He later served on the board of Ashanti Goldfields Company Limited, the Bank of Ghana, and City Savings and Loans Company Limited in Ghana, which he also founded.

== Personal life ==
Anin is the brother of P. D. Anin, the former justice of the Supreme Court of Ghana, and the cousin of Lucy Anin, the youngest member of parliament of the first republic.

== Publications ==
As a writer Anin's works have been focused on the economy of Ghana, some of his books include;

- Essays on the Political Economy of Ghana, (1991);
- Gold in Ghana, (1993);
- Banking in Ghana, (2000);
- An Economic Blueprint for Ghana, (2003).

== See also ==
- List of Ghanaian writers
