= Kodwo Sam Annan =

Ghanaian politician

Member of the Ghana Parliament for Asikuma
- In office 1965–1966
- Preceded by: New
- Succeeded by: Constituency abolished

Personal details
- Born: Kodwo Sam Annan Gold Coast
- Party: Convention People's Party

Kodwo Sam Annan was a Ghanaian politician. He served as a member of parliament for the Asikuma constituency from 1965 to 1966. Upon his return from his studies in United Kingdom in 1960, he was appointed regional secretary for the Convention People's Party.

== See also ==
- List of MPs elected in the 1965 Ghanaian parliamentary election
