= Margaret Ocran =

Ghanaian politician

Margaret Ocran is a Ghanaian politician and educator. She was a member of the Parliament of Ghana, representing the Amanano Constituency.

== Career ==
Prior to entering politics, Ocran was an educator. She taught at the Kumasi Government Girls' School, and later became the headmistress of Yaa Achia Middle Girls' School in Kumasi. In 1965, she was elected as a member of Parliament for the Amanano Constituency as a member of the Convention People's Party. She remained in this position until 24 February 1966, when the Nkrumah government was overthrown.
