= Charles Ahiadzro Adzofia =

Ghanaian politician

Member of the Ghana Parliament for Dzodze
- In office 1965–1966
- Preceded by: New
- Succeeded by: Bliss Ackuaku

Member of the Ghana Parliament for Anlo East
- In office 1959–1965
- Preceded by: Charles Henry Chapman
- Succeeded by: Constituency abolished

Personal details
- Born: Charles Ahiadzro Adzofia Gold Coast
- Party: Convention People's Party

Charles Ahiadzro Adzofia was a Ghanaian politician. He was the member of parliament for the Anlo East constituency from 1959 to 1965. He was the replacement for Charles Henry Chapman when the latter resigned as a member of parliament due to his appointment as a member of the Public Service Commission in 1959. He stood for the seat on the ticket of the Convention People's Party unopposed. In 1965 when the number of constituencies had been increased he became the member of parliament for the Dzodze constituency. He remained in parliament until 1966 when the Nkrumah government was overthrown.

== See also ==
- List of MPs elected in the 1965 Ghanaian parliamentary election
