= Paul Edward Affum Okwabi =

Ghanaian pharmacist and politician

Member of the Ghana Parliament for Guan
- In office June 1965 – 24 February 1966
- Preceded by: New
- Succeeded by: Constituency abolished

Personal details
- Born: Paul Edward Affum Okwabi; 7 March 1916 Akim Akroso near Akim Oda, Eastern Region, Gold Coast
- Party: Convention People's Party
- Education: Accra Academy
- Profession: Pharmacist

Paul Edward Affum Okwabi was a Ghanaian pharmacist and politician. He was the member of parliament for the Guan constituency from 1965 to 1966.

== Early life and education ==
Okwabi was born on 7 March 1916 at Akim Akroso near Akim Oda in the Eastern Region of Ghana (then Gold Coast). He had his primary education at the Accra Grammar School from 1925 to 1926, Accra St. Mary's School in 1927 and Ashanti Effiduase Presbyterian Primary School from 1928 to 1929. He attended Ashanti Mampong Presbyterian Middle School from 1930 to 1933 and enrolled at the Accra Academy for his secondary education from 1934 to 1940. After a short stint teaching Arts after his secondary education, he entered the Government School of Pharmacy in 1941. He completed his studies at the Government School of Pharmacy in 1944.

== Career and politics ==
After his studies at the Accra Academy, he served as an Arts master for about a year before entering the Government School of Pharmacy. After his studies at the Government School of Pharmacy, he entered Government service from 1944 to 1947. He then set up his own practice at Koforidua. He became the Chairman of the Koforidua branch of the Ghana Society for the Prevention of Tuberculosis, and a member of the Koforidua Town Development Committee. He was a member of the Koforidua Hospital visiting committee and the chairman for the Eastern Region branch of the Ghana Society for the Blind and Rehabilitation.

Okwabi also served as a Lay Magistrate for the Eastern Region Juvenile Court and the Chairman of the amateur boxing referee/judge association of the Eastern Region. Okwabi also served as a presbyter and chief adviser for the Anum constituency branch of the Convention People's Party (CPP). He became a member of parliament for the Guan constituency on the ticket of the CPP from June 1965 until 24 February 1966 when the Nkrumah government was overthrown.

== Personal life ==
Okwabi's hobbies included playing table tennis, boxing, watching movies, gardening, and researching in drugs and herbs. He founded the Pharmaceutical Drug Company in 1961.

== See also ==
- List of MPs elected in the 1965 Ghanaian parliamentary election
