= Ramatu Baba =

Ghanaian politician

Member of the Ghana Parliament for Yendi
- In office 1965–1966
- Preceded by: New
- Succeeded by: Shanni Hazrat Mahama

Personal details
- Born: Ramatu Baba Gold Coast
- Party: Convention People's Party
- Education: Achimota School

Ramatu Baba was a Ghanaian politician in the first republic. She was the first female district commissioner in Ghana and the only woman to have been district commissioner for the Yendi district. She was the member of parliament for the Yendi constituency from 1965 to 1966.

== Biography ==
Ramatu Baba was the daughter of the chief butcher of Yendi. She was educated in schools in her home district and Achimota School in Accra. She took up a job in the Social Welfare department at Tamale (the capital of the Northern Region) after school. She left civil service to work as a regional woman organizer for the United Ghana Farmers' Council (UGFC), a group under the Convention People's Party (CPP). She spent 3 years touring the entire region and her job extended to teaching the male farmers as well as the female farmers. She was appointed District Commissioner for the Yendi district at the age of twenty-seven (27). She served Yendi as a District Commissioner until 1965 when she became the member of parliament (MP) for the Yendi constituency. She remained MP until February 1966 when the Nkrumah government was ousted.

In 2003, she appeared before the National Reconciliation Commission requesting that her two houses and a car that were seized after the first republic government was overthrown be returned to her. She explained that the Azu Crabbe commission had exonerated her however the then military government went on to confiscate her assets. She further added that she sent a letter to the PNDC government about her plight and she was directed to the Confiscated Assets Committee. The then head/chairperson of the commission Mrs. Betty Mould-Iddrisu helped her acquire her buildings in Tamale which were then being occupied by others. The buildings were later taken back as the residents of the building also reported the case to the Confiscated Assets Committee. She had two sons.

== See also ==
- List of MPs elected in the 1965 Ghanaian parliamentary election
