= Kobina Hagan =

Ghanaian politician (1923–1977)

Member of the Ghana Parliament for Denkyira
- In office 1965–1966
- Preceded by: Francis Edward Techie-Menson
- Succeeded by: Charles Omar Nyanor

Personal details
- Born: Felix Kobina Atta Hagan; 11 November 1923 Saltpond, Central Region, Gold Coast
- Died: 1977 (aged 53–54)
- Party: Convention People's Party
- Education: Mfantsipim School; Wesley College of Education, Kumasi; University of Ghana
- Occupation: Politician
- Profession: Teacher

Kobina Hagan (1923-1977) was a Ghanaian politician and teacher. He was the Principal Secretary for the Central Organisation of Sports (COS) from 1960 to 1963 and later member of parliament for the Denkyira constituency from 1965 to 1966.

== Early life ==
Hagan was born on 11 November 1923 at Saltpond in Central Region, Ghana (then Gold Coast). He was educated at Mfantsipim School and Wesley College of Education, Kumasi. While at Wesley College, Hagan was one of the few students in the school to obtain colours for all the games played in the school, they included; football, athletics, cricket and hockey. After teaching for a period of about 3 years, he entered the University College of the Gold Coast (now the University of Ghana as a founding student of the university.

== Career ==
=== Teaching and politics ===
Hagan began as a teacher with the Methodist Educational Unit. He taught in both Prestea and Dunkwa-On-Offin from 1944 to 1947. After his studies at the University College of the Gold Coast, he joined the teaching staff of his alma maters Mfantsipim School and later on, Wesley College of Education, Kumasi. After teaching for the Methodist Educational Unit for a while, he was appointed principal of the Kwame Nkrumah Workers' College in 1959. A year later he joined the Central Organisation of Sports (COS) as its Principal Secretary. He worked in this capacity for a year after which he was appointed principal of the Kwame Nkrumah Ideological Institute in Winneba. He served as principal of the college from 1961 until 1963 when he gained an appointment at the University of Ghana, as a Senior Resident Tutor at the Institute of Public Education (IPE). In 1964 he became the Director of Adult Education, University of Ghana. Hagan held this appointment from 1964 until the overthrow of the Nkrumah government in 1966. In 1965 he doubled as a member of parliament when he was elected to represent the Denkyira constituency on the ticket of the Convention People's Party (CPP).

=== Sports ===
Hagan played football for clubs in the Kumasi and Dunkwa areas, and became an honorary coach for the Kumasi Asante Kotoko Football Club. As a member of the Central Organisation of Sports (COS), he served as the team manager of the Ghana national team in their triumphs in the 4th and 5th African Cup of Nations.

== Personal life ==
In 1966 Hagan founded the Aggrey Memorial Preparatory School. He died in 1977 and was survived by his mother and six children. His hobby was sports.

== See also ==
- List of MPs elected in the 1965 Ghanaian parliamentary election
