= Edward Ago-Ackam =

Ghanaian politician

Member of the Ghana Parliament for Dangbe
- In office 1965–1966
- Preceded by: New
- Succeeded by: Constituency abolished

Member of the Ghana Parliament for Dangbe-Shai
- In office 1956–1965
- Preceded by: Clarkson Thomas Nylander
- Succeeded by: Jonathan Tetteh Ofei

Personal details
- Born: Edward Ago-Ackam; 30 November 1899 Ningo, Gold Coast
- Party: Convention People's Party

Edward Ago-Ackam was a Ghanaian politician. He was a member of parliament for the Dangbe-Shai electoral area from 1956 to 1965. In 1965 he became the member of parliament for the Dangbe constituency until February 1966.

== Early life and education ==
Ago-Ackam was born on 30 November 1899 at Ningo in the Greater Accra Region of Ghana (then Gold Coast). He studied at the Wesleyan Mission School in Kpong.

== Career and politics ==
Ago-Ackam was a clerk and a storekeeper for Messrs Millers, F and A Swanzy A. and E.T.C., and U.A.C. from 1921 to 1948. He later joined Messrs A.G. Leventis and Company Limited from 1949 to 1956. In 1950 he was the vice chairman of the Convention People's Party and in 1953 he doubled as the chairman of the Ningo Area Committee. He served in these positions until 1956 when he was nominated by the CPP to represent the Dangbe Shai electoral area in the Legislative Assembly. He replaced Clarkson Thomas Nylander who had represented the Dangbe-Shai area on the ticket of the CPP from 1954 to 1956. Nylander from 1956 onwards represented the Ga Rural electoral area. Ago-Ackam won the Dangbe-Shai seat and remained in parliament representing the area from 1956 until 1965. In 1965, the constituency was split into the Dangbe constituency and the Shai constituency. Ago-Ackam became the member of parliament for the Dangbe constituency from 1965 to February 1966 when the Nkrumah government was overthrown.

== Personal life ==
Ago-Ackam's hobbies included reading and gardening.

== See also ==
- List of MLAs elected in the 1956 Gold Coast legislative election
- List of MPs elected in the 1965 Ghanaian parliamentary election
