= Benjamin Alphonsus Kwasi Konu =

Ghanaian politician

Member of the Ghana Parliament for Sogakofe Constituency

Personal details
- Born: South Tongu
- Party: Convention People's Party
- Occupation: Tutor

Benjamin Alphonsus Kwasi Konu was a Ghanaian politician and tutor.

== Early life ==
Konu hailed from South Tongu.

== Career ==
In July 1956, Konu was elected at the general election to serve in the Legislative Assembly. He was a tutor.

== Politics ==
Konu was the Member of Parliament for the Sogakofe Constituency. He was a member of the Convention People's Party. He was also the Minister for Fisheries.
