= Lucy Anin =

Ghanaian politician

Member of the Ghana Parliament for Bechem
- In office 1965–1966
- Preceded by: New
- Succeeded by: Constituency abolished

Member of the Ghana Parliament for Woman member from the Brong Ahafo Region
- In office 1960–1965
- Preceded by: New
- Succeeded by: Position abolished

Personal details
- Born: Lucy Anin; 13 June 1939 (age 87) Gold Coast
- Party: Convention People's Party

Lucy Anin (born 13 June 1939) is a Ghanaian politician. She was a member of parliament representing the Brong Ahafo Region from 1960 to 1965 and the member of parliament for the Bechem constituency from 1965 to 1966.

== Life and politics ==
Anin was among the first women to enter the Parliament of Ghana in 1960 under the representation of the people (women members) act. She was among the 10 women who were elected unopposed on 27 June 1960 on the ticket of the Convention People's Party.

She subsequently became the youngest member of parliament, entering parliament at the age of 21. In 1965, she became the member of parliament representing the Bechem constituency. In 1966 when the Nkrumah government was overthrown she was imprisoned for 8 months while pregnant. Today, she is a member of the Convention People's Party council of elders and the only woman among the ten women in Ghana's first parliament alive.

She is the cousin of jurist and former Supreme Court judge; Patrick Dankwa Anin, and economist and former chief executive officer of the Ghana Commercial Bank; T. E. Anin.

== See also ==
- List of MPs elected in the 1965 Ghanaian parliamentary election
