= Odoben =

Coordinates: 5°38′N 0°53′W

- Town
- Interactive map of Odoben
- Country: Ghana
- Region: Central Region

Odoben is a town located in the Asikuma Odoben Brakwa district of the Central Region of Ghana. The town is known for its cocoa production and the food basket of the two main markets the Swedru and Breman Asikuma because it supplies food such as plantains, kontonmire ,cassava,oranges etc not forgetting palm oil production . It is the second most prominent town after Breman Asikuma - the district capital. Odoben was famously visited by Ghana’s first president, Dr Kwame Nkrumah and during his era, the town received massive development. Telephone and telegraph lines were installed linking the town to Agona Swedru. Among the famous people hailing from Odoben are, the famous Ghanaian politician and statesman, P.C. Appiah Ofori and the legendary Kumasi Asante Kotoko FC chairman Ofori Nuako. The town is home to Odoben Senior High School, a reputable second cycle institution in Ghana. The school is a second cycle institution. It is the hometown of renowned Ghanaian Blogger Bismark Botchwey, CEO of Sintim Media.
