= Lily Appiah =

Ghanaian politician

Member of the Ghana Parliament for Nsawam-Aburi
- In office 1965–1966
- Preceded by: New
- Succeeded by: Ebenezer Theophilus Odartei Ayeh

Personal details
- Born: Lily Appiah Gold Coast
- Party: Convention People's Party

Lily Appiah was a Ghanaian politician in the first republic. She was the member of parliament for the Nsawam-Aburi constituency from 1965 to 1966.

== See also ==
- List of MPs elected in the 1965 Ghanaian parliamentary election
