= Akantigsi Afoko =

Ghanaian politician

Member of the Ghana Parliament for Sandema
- In office 1965–1966
- Preceded by: New
- Succeeded by: Lydia Azuele Akanbodiipo

Member of the Ghana Parliament for Builsa
- In office 1954–1965
- Preceded by: New
- Succeeded by: Constituency abolished

Personal details
- Born: Akantigsi Afoko; 1923 Sandema, Gold Coast
- Party: Convention People's Party; Northern People's Party
- Profession: Teacher

Akantigsi Afoko was a Ghanaian teacher and politician. He was a member of the Legislative Assembly representing the Northern territories from 1951 to 1954. In 1954 he was elected to represent the Builsa electoral district in the Legislative Assembly, he was re-elected in 1956 and maintained his post as the member of parliament for the constituency until 1965. In 1965 he became the member of parliament for the Sandema constituency. He served in this capacity until the ousting of the Nkrumah government in 1966. Prior to politics Afoko was a trained teacher who taught at Fumbisi, a town in the Builsa District of Ghana.

== Early life and education ==
Afoko was born in 1923 at Sandema in the then Northern Territories of the then Gold Coast (now in the Upper East Region of Ghana). He started primary school in 1936 at Sandema and completed his primary school education in 1940. In 1941 he entered the Tamale Middle School and his middle school education ended in 1944. He trained as a teacher at the Government Teacher Training College from 1945 to 1946 and obtained his Teachers' Certificate B. After teaching for a year at Fumbisi (a town in the Builsa District), he returned to the Government Teacher Training College in 1949 and received his Teachers' Certificate A in 1950.

== Career and politics ==
He was the teacher in charge of the Fumbisi Day School from 1947 to 1948. He was elected into the legislative assembly in 1951 as a territorial member of the Northern Territories. In the 1954 election he was elected to represent the Builsa electoral district in the legislative assembly on the ticket of the Convention People's Party (CPP). He was re-elected in the 1956 election again on the ticket of the CPP to represent Builsa. In July 1957 Afoko resigned from the CPP to join the Northern People's Party. He re-joined the CPP on 12 March 1958. He represented the Builsa constituency in parliament from then until 1965. In 1965 he became the member of parliament for the Sandema constituency. He remained in parliament until the overthrow of the Nkrumah government in 1966.

== Personal life ==
Afoko is the uncle of the former chairman of the New Patriotic Party; Paul Afoko. His hobby was agriculture.

== See also ==
- List of MLAs elected in the 1951 Gold Coast legislative election
- List of MLAs elected in the 1954 Gold Coast legislative election
- List of MLAs elected in the 1956 Gold Coast legislative election
- List of MPs elected in the 1965 Ghanaian parliamentary election
