= John Kwasi Appiah =

Ghanaian politician

Member of the Ghana Parliament for Ahafo Ano
- In office 1965–1966
- Preceded by: New
- Succeeded by: Hanson Matthew Adjei-Sarpong

Personal details
- Born: John Kwasi Appiah Gold Coast
- Party: Convention People's Party

John Kwasi Annin was a Ghanaian politician in the first republic. He was the member of parliament for the Ahafo Ano constituency from 1965 to 1966.

== See also ==
- List of MPs elected in the 1965 Ghanaian parliamentary election
