= Joseph Mainoo =

Ghanaian politician and trader

Personal details
- Party: Convention Peoples Party
- Occupation: Businessman

Joseph Mainoo (also known as Joe Mainoo) was a Ghanaian politician and trader.

== Early life ==
Mainoo hailed from Mbrom District in the Ashanti Region of Ghana.

== Career ==
In August 1954, he was the storekeeper at the Cocoa Purchasing Company (CPC). Mainoo was the Director of Adom-Nsiah Construction Limited. He was also the Assistant Manager of the CPC. In 1974, he was the managing director of the Amalgamated Farmers Marketing Company. He was the Chairman of the Tema Development Corporation. He was also the Chairman of the Tema Local Council. He was also the Manager of the Gold Coast Machinery stores. In 1954, he was the Assistant Regional Manager in the Ashanti Region and later became the Regional Manager in 1955.

== Politics ==
Mainoo was a member of the Convention Peoples Party (CPP). In 1958, he contested for the CPP as a Member of Parliament and lost in Ashanti New Town.

== Personal life ==
Mainoo was the son in law of Mrs. Hagar Nicholls who was the first trained nurse-midwife in the Ashanti Region of Ghana.

== Controversy ==
In May 1969, Mainoo's asset together with other CPP members were investigated but later the investigation was discontinued.
