= James Kwame Twum =

Ghanaian journalist and politician

Member of Parliament for Asankragua
- In office 1965–1966
- Preceded by: New
- Succeeded by: Constituency abolished

Member of Parliament for Amenfi-Aowin
- In office 1962–1965
- Preceded by: Patrick Kwame Kusi Quaidoo
- Succeeded by: Constituency split

Personal details
- Born: James Kwame Twum
- Citizenship: Ghanaian
- Party: Convention People's Party

James Kwame Twum was Ghanaian journalist and politician. He served as the member of parliament for the Amenfi-Aowin constituency from 1962 to 1965 and the member of parliament for the Asankragua constituency from 1965 to 1966.

== See also ==
- List of MPs elected in the 1965 Ghanaian parliamentary election
