= Grace Ayensu =

Ghanaian politician

Member of the Ghana Parliament for Gomoa
- In office 1965–1966
- Preceded by: New
- Succeeded by: Constituency abolished

Member of the Ghana Parliament for First member for the Western Region
- In office 1960–1965

Personal details
- Born: Grace Ayensu; September 24, 1914 Gold Coast
- Died: February 11, 1975 (aged 60)
- Party: Convention People's Party

Grace Ayensu was a Ghanaian politician. She was a member of parliament representing the Western Region from 1960 to 1965 and the member of parliament for the Gomoa constituency from 1965 to 1966.

Ayensu was among the first women to enter the parliament of Ghana in 1960 under the representation of the people (women members) act. She was among the 10 women who were elected unopposed on 27 June 1960 on the ticket Convention People's Party.

== Early life and education ==
Grace was born on 24 September 1914 at Elmina. She was educated at St. Peter's School in Sekondi and the Elmina Convent in Elmina from 1921 to 1927.

== Career and politics ==
Ayensu left school and became a trader in 1928. She traded in textiles, provisions and hardware. In addition to trading, she was involved the timber business from 1941 to 1958.

Ayensu volunteered for several organizations including serving as first woman President for the Sekondi/Takoradi Consumers' Cooperative Society in 1945 and patron of the Sekondi/Takoradi branch of the National Youth League in the early 1950s. In 1954 she was elected as a member of the Sekondi/Takoradi Municipal Council. That same year, she received a certificate of honour and a badge from the Department of Social Welfare for her voluntary services in Sekondi/Takoradi Municipality. She served on the Sekondi/Takoradi Municipal Council until 1960. While a member of the council, she was a member of the Women Delegation to Ceylon in 1958. She was also the second Vice President of the National Federation of Ghana Women and the President of the federation for the Sekondi/Takoradi District. She served on the Board of Governors of Sekondi College and Fijai Day Secondary School. She also served on the Hospital and Prisons Visiting Committee. On 27 June 1960 she was elected as a member of parliament as the first member for the Western Region. In July 1965 she became the member of parliament for the Gomoa constituency. In September that same year, she was appointed the chairperson of the State Bakery Corporation. She remained in these positions until February 1966 when the Nkrumah government was overthrown.

== Personal life ==
Grace Ayensu was married to an administrator who worked with the Ghana railways. She had ten children. Her son Edward S. Ayensu, now deceased, was an international development advisor on science, technology and economic development. Her hobbies were gardening and singing.

She died on 11 February 1975.

== See also ==
- List of MPs elected in the 1965 Ghanaian parliamentary election
