= Martin Kyerematen =

Ghanaian politician

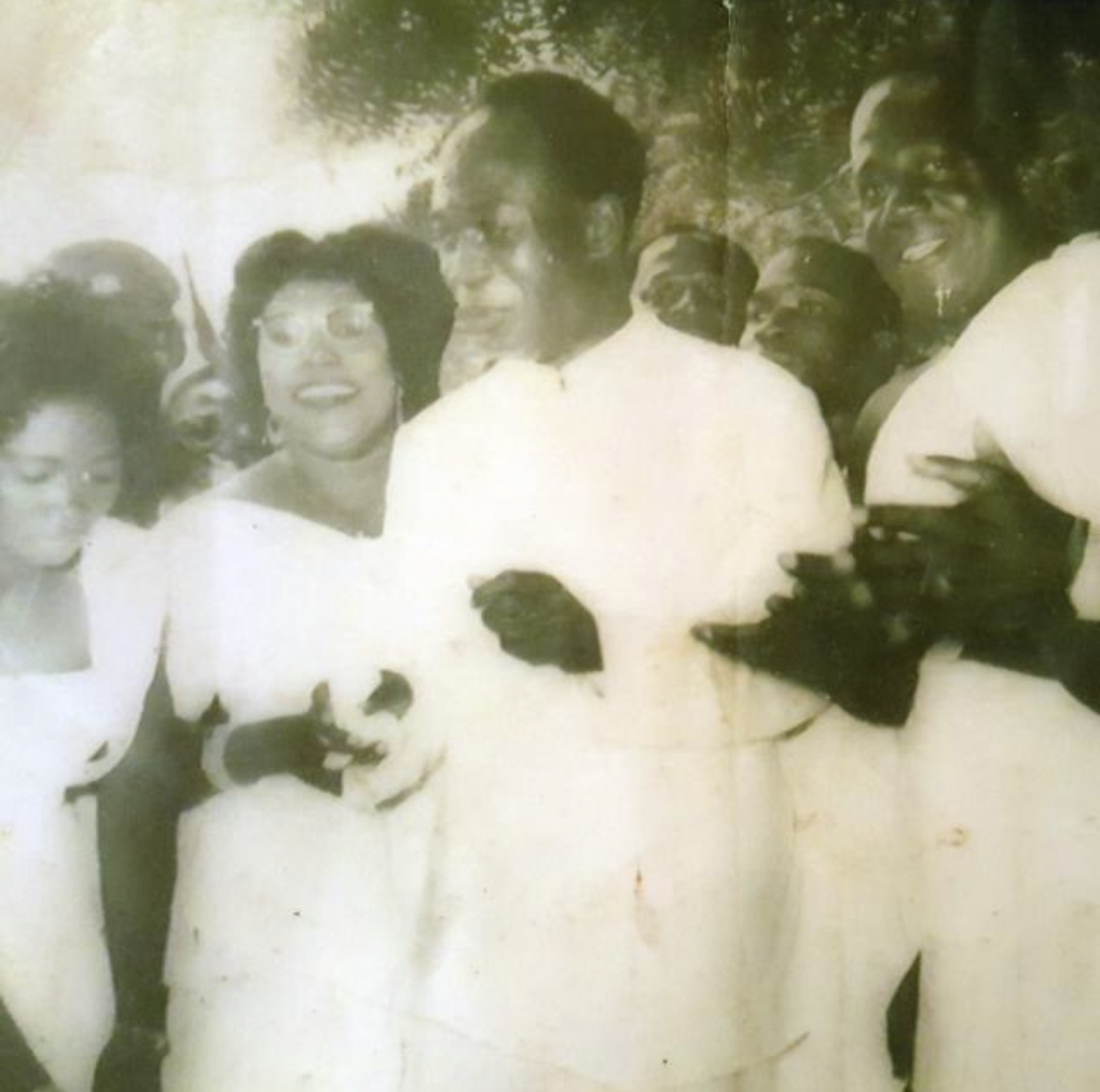
- Kyerematen (right) with Kwame Nkrumah, Prime Minister and President of Ghana (left)

Member of the Ghana Parliament for Agona
- In office 1965–1966
- Preceded by: Constituency split
- Succeeded by: Constituency abolished

Member of the Ghana Parliament for Agona Kwabre
- In office 1961–1965
- Preceded by: Victor Owusu
- Succeeded by: Victor Owusu

Personal details
- Born: Martin Kyerematen Gold Coast
- Died: Agona
- Party: Convention People's Party
- Occupation: Magistrate

Martin Kyerematen was a Ghanaian politician in the first republic. He became the member of parliament (MP) for the Agona Kwabre constituency in 1961 when the then-MP for the constituency, Victor Owusu, was detained for allegedly plotting a coup to overthrow the then incumbent Nkrumah government. He served in this capacity until 1965 when he became the member of parliament for the Agona constituency. He represented the constituency in parliament from 1965 to 1966.

== See also ==
- List of MPs elected in the 1965 Ghanaian parliamentary election
