= Kofi Agyare =

Ghanaian politician

Member of the Ghana Parliament for Akim Manso
- In office 1965–1966
- Preceded by: New
- Succeeded by: Constituency abolished

Personal details
- Born: Kofi Agyare; 1913 Abetifi, Eastern Region, Gold Coast
- Party: Convention People's Party

Kofi Agyare was a Ghanaian politician. He was the member of parliament for Akim Manso from 1965 to 1966.

== Early life and education ==
Agyare was born in 1913 at Abetifi, a town in the Eastern Region of Ghana (then Gold Coast). He had his education at the Presby Junior School and Presby Senior School all in the Abetifi-Kwahu area from 1921 to 1931.

== Career and politics ==
After school he worked as a registrar at the Omanhene's (traditional ruler) tribunal in Kwahu Abene from 1932 to 1933. In 1934 he moved to Koforidua to work at Cadbury as a station clerk. From 1936 to 1938 he was the registrar of the Paramount Tribunal and Buem State Council at Borada in the Volta Region. He worked as a licensed letter writer at Akim Oda then in the Western Akim District from 1939 to 1940. In 1941 he worked at the Akim Kotoku native court which was situated at Akroso as a registrar. While working as a registrar for the court, he helped build the Akroso market and the state school. In 1945 he was the court clerk and secretary of the Omanhene (traditional ruler) of the Gomoa Assin Traditional Area, he was stationed at Apam and Winneba. He became the first chairman of the Convention People's Party branch in Winneba in 1949. In 1955 he was appointed member of the national food board. He served on the board for one year and was appointed director of G. C. Match Coy in 1956. He served in that post for a year as well. In 1957 he was made the rural liaison officer of the Ghana A.D.C. A year later he was appointed national loans supervisor for the State Cocoa Marketing Board. He served in this position from 1958 to 1965. In 1965 he became the member of parliament for the Akim Manso constituency. He was the member of parliament for the constituency until February 1966 when the Nkrumah government was overthrown.

== Personal life ==
His hobbies were farming, gardening, reading and playing lawn tennis.

== See also ==
- List of MPs elected in the 1965 Ghanaian parliamentary election
