= Solomon Antwi Kwaku Bonsu =

Ghanaian politician

Samuel Antwi Kwaku Bonsu

Minister of Pensions and National Insurance
- In office July 1965 – February 1966
- President: Dr Kwame Nkrumah
- Preceded by: A. K. Onwona-Agyemang
- Succeeded by: Ministry abolished

Minister of Co-operatives
- In office January 1965 – July 1965
- President: Dr. Kwame Nkrumah
- Preceded by: New
- Succeeded by: Baffour Kwabena Senkyire

Member of Parliament for Adotobri
- In office June 1965 – February 1966
- Preceded by: New
- Succeeded by: Constituency abolished

Member of Parliament for Sekyere West
- In office 12 June 1959 – June 1965
- Preceded by: R. R. Amponsah
- Succeeded by: Constituency abolished

Personal details
- Born: Solomon Antwi Kwaku Bonsu; 1 November 1921
- Citizenship: Ghanaian
- Education: Presbyterian College of Education, Akropong

Samuel Antwi Kwaku Bonsu, also known by the name Solomon Antwi Kwaku Bonsu, was a Ghanaian politician in the first republic. He was the Minister of Co-operatives and later Minister of Pensions and National Insurance. He was also the member of parliament for the Sekyere West constituency from 1959 to 1965 and the member of parliament for the Adotobri constituency from 1965 to 1966.

== Early life and education ==
Bonsu was born on 21 November 1921 at Asante Mampong in the Ashanti Region. After completing his Standard Seven, he entered the Presbyterian College of Education (then the Presbyterian Training College) where he obtained his Teachers' Certificate 'A'. He later continued at the Theological Seminary at Akropong graduating in 1941. In 1954 he studied to obtain his GCE Advanced Level certificate prior to proceeding to the United Kingdom to study law at the Middle Temple, London. He was called to the bar as a barrister-at-law in 1957.

== Life and politics ==
Bonsu begun as a teacher at the Kumasi Presbyterian Middle School before joining the Kumasi branch of U. T. C. as a Departmental Store Manager.

Bonsu became a private legal practitioner in 1959, and on 12 June that same year, he was sworn into office as the member parliament for the Sekyere West constituency. This was as a result of the seat being vacant due to a law in parliament at the time that deprived members of parliament of their seat if they were unable to be present in parliament for ten (10) consecutive days.

The former occupant of the seat, R. R. Amponsah, fell victim to this fate as he was detained while being trialled at the time for allegedly plotting with M. K. Apaloo to overthrow Nkrumah. He was appointed deputy minister for Justice in 1960 and a year later, he was appointed Chief of State Protocol for the Queen when she visited Ghana. Bonsu served as the deputy minister for Justice from 1960 to January 1965 when he was appointed Minister of Co-operatives by the then president Dr. Kwame Nkrumah. In June that same year, he was moved to head the Ministry of Pensions and National Insurance. A month later, he was made member of parliament for the Adotobri constituency. He served in these capacities in the Nkrumah government until Nkrumah was overthrown in February 1966.

== See also ==
- Nkrumah government
- List of MLAs elected in the 1956 Gold Coast legislative election
- List of MPs elected in the 1965 Ghanaian parliamentary election
