= Isaac Abraham Amihere =

Ghanaian politician (1915–??)

Member of the Ghana Parliament for Axim
- In office 1965–1966
- Preceded by: New
- Succeeded by: Constituency abolished

Personal details
- Born: Isaac Abraham Amihere; 30 March 1915 Axim, Gold Coast
- Party: Convention People's Party

Isaac Abraham Amihere was a Ghanaian politician. He was the member of parliament for the Axim constituency from 1965 to 1966. Prior to politics Amihere was the general manager for the Guinea Press.

== Early life and education ==
Amihere was born on 30 March 1915 to Theophilus Amihere and Ama Suamhwe at Axim in the Western Region of Ghana (then Gold Coast). He had his early education at the Half Assini Methodist School and proceeded to the Saltpond English Church School for his middle school education which he completed in 1933. He later undertook studies in shorthand, typing, bookkeeping and English privately.

== Career ==
Amihere begun working at Messrs. U.A.C. in 1937. He was in the service of the company until July 1953. In August 1953 became manager of the Cocoa Purchasing Company. He was appointed acting manager on 4 December 1956 and he served in that position until his services with the company were terminated when the company went into liquidation. He joined Nadeco Ltd as the managing director of the company until 1958 when he became the Administrative Manager of the Guinea Press. In March 1958 he was promoted to the position of Deputy Manager and later rose to General Manager status.

== Politics ==
In 1965 Amihere became the member of parliament representing the Axim constituency. Prior to 1965 the constituency was known as Eastern Nzema Axim constituency. He remained member of parliament for the Axim constituency until February 1966 when the Nkrumah government was overthrown.

== Personal life ==
Amihere married Madam Adwoa in 1954 but the marriage was dissolved in 1956. That same year he married Victoria Baddoo and the marriage was dissolved two years later. He later married Madames Yawson and Margaret Asare.

== See also ==
- List of MPs elected in the 1965 Ghanaian parliamentary election
