= Comfort Asamoah =

Ghanaian politician

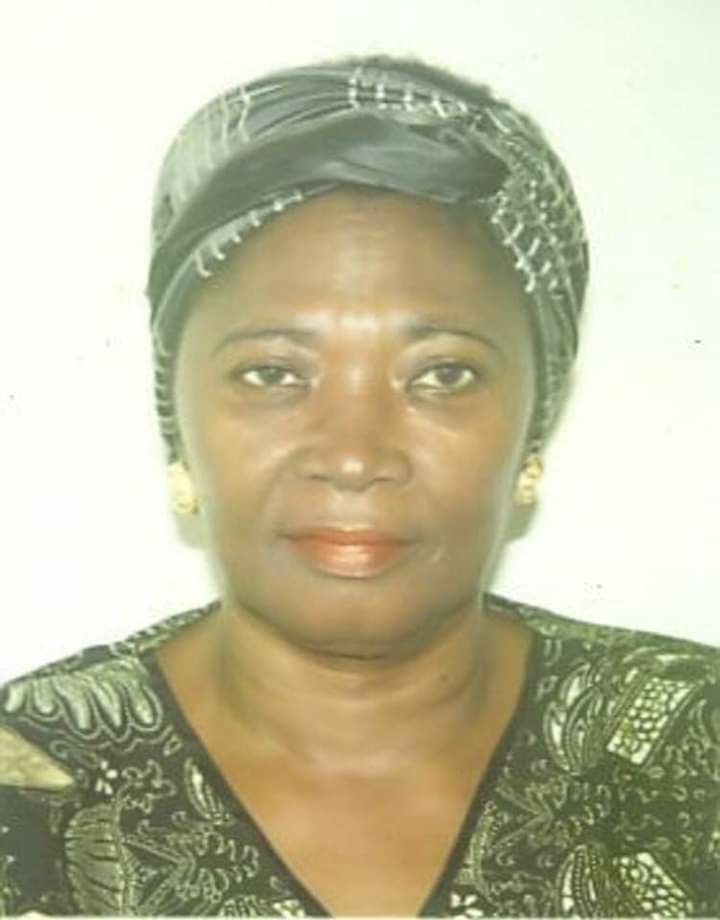

Member of the Ghana Parliament for Asante Mampong
- In office 1965–1966
- Preceded by: New
- Succeeded by: Constituency split

Member of the Ghana Parliament for Member for the Ashanti Region
- In office 1960–1965

Personal details
- Born: Comfort Asamoah; 10 November 1934 Gold Coast
- Died: 18 October 2004 (aged 69) London, United Kingdom
- Party: Convention People's Party
- Children: 4 including John K. Tettegah

Comfort Asamoah was a Ghanaian politician. She was a member of parliament representing the Ashanti Region from 1960 to 1965 and the member of parliament for Asante Mampong from 1965 to 1966.

Asamoah was among the first women to enter the parliament of Ghana in 1960 under the representation of the people (women members) act. She was among the 10 women who were elected unopposed on 27 June 1960 on the ticket Convention People's Party.

Prior to entering parliament, she served with the Workers Brigade from 1957 to 1960.

== See also ==
- List of MPs elected in the 1965 Ghanaian parliamentary election
