= Saarrah Adu-Gyamfi =

Ghanaian politician

Saarrah Adu Gyamfi

Member of the Ghana Parliament for Jaman
- In office 1965–1966
- Preceded by: New
- Succeeded by: Michael Kwame Attah

Personal details
- Born: Saarrah Adu Gyamfi Gold Coast
- Party: Convention People's Party

Saarrah Adu Gyamfi was a Ghanaian politician. He was the member of parliament for the Jaman constituency. Prior to entering parliament, he was the spraying superintendent for the Ministry of Agriculture in Sunyani.

== See also ==
- List of MPs elected in the 1965 Ghanaian parliamentary election
