= Victoria Tagoe =

Ghanaian politician

Victoria Tagoe was a Ghanaian politician and member of the second Parliament of the 1st Republic of Ghana.

Tagoe served as the member of parliament for the Birimagya constituency in the Eastern Region of Ghana. She remained in this position from 1965 until 24 February 1966 when the Nkrumah government was overthrown.
