= Kwamena Tuffuor Ampem =

Ghanaian politician

Member of the Ghana Parliament for Abirem
- In office 1965–1966
- Preceded by: New
- Succeeded by: Constituency abolished

Personal details
- Born: Kwamena Tuffuor Ampem Gold Coast
- Party: Convention People's Party

Kwamena Tuffuor Ampem was a Ghanaian politician in the first republic. He was the member of parliament for the Abirem constituency from 1965 to 1966.

== See also ==
- List of MPs elected in the 1965 Ghanaian parliamentary election
