= Stephen Allen Dzirasa =

Ghanaian educationist, priest and politician

Resident Minister in Guinea
- In office July 1960 – 1962
- President: Dr. Kwame Nkrumah
- Preceded by: J. H. Allassani
- Succeeded by: Kweku Budu-Acquah

Member of Parliament for Battor
- In office 1965 – February 1966
- Preceded by: New
- Succeeded by: Constituency Abolished

Member of Parliament for Upper Tongu
- In office June 1954 – 1965
- Preceded by: New
- Succeeded by: Samuel Awuku Okudzeto

Personal details
- Born: Stephen Allen Kodjoe Dzirasa; 23 July 1918 Tongu, Volta Region
- Citizenship: Ghanaian

Reverend Stephen Allen Kodjoe Dzirasa was a Ghanaian Educationist, Priest and Politician. He was a teacher prior to being ordained as a Methodist minister. He was a minister of state in the First Republic. He served as Ghana's resident minister in Guinea and also Deputy Minister for Foreign Affairs. He was a member of parliament representing the Upper Tongu electoral district and later representing the Battor constituency.

== Early life and education ==
Dzirasa was born on 23 July 1918, in the Tongu district of the Volta Region to Doefe and Andrews Torgbemu Dzirasa. At a very young age his parents separated and he was moved by his mother to Kpong where he lived with his maternal grandfather, Awittor. His father was allowed to bring him to his side when he was eight years old and from there he began his early education. In 1926 he attended Aveime Salem; A Methodist School that was situated in the village. He continued his education at the Presbyterian Boarding School at Ada Foa and later Trinity College in Kumasi.

== Career and politics ==
Dzirasa worked on his father's farm as a herdsman when he was young, driving his father's cattle out for food every day. He also learned fishing, farming, and petty trading from his father and uncle. After schooling, Dzirasa was employed at U. T. C as an assistant storekeeper. After working for some time as a teacher, he was ordained into the Methodist Ministry in 1951. He was consequently appointed second Assistant Synod Secretary from 1952 to 1954.

He was chairman of the Lower Tongu Local Council and in 1953 and appointed member of the Van Lare Commission. He was elected as a Member of the Legislative Assembly for Upper Tongu in June 1954. In July 1960 he was appointed Resident Minister to Guinea and in December 1962 he was made deputy minister for Foreign Affairs (ministerial secretary). He served in this capacity until the overthrow of the Nkrumah government in February 1966.

== Personal life ==
Dzirasa was the last born of four children of his mother and the only child of his mother born to his father.
