= Regina Asamany =

Ghanaian politician (born 1927)

Member of the Ghana Parliament for Kpando
- In office 1965–1966
- Preceded by: New
- Succeeded by: Constituency abolished

Member of the Ghana Parliament for Member for the Volta Region
- In office 1960–1965

Personal details
- Born: Regina Catherine Ama Asamany; 30 July 1927 Gold Coast
- Party: Convention People's Party

Regina Asamany (born 30 July 1927) was a Ghanaian politician who hailed from Kpando, a town in the Volta Region of Ghana. She is widely recognised as one of the women whose efforts helped Ghana attain independence. She was the daughter of an ivory carver and the only woman to make it into the first rank of the Togoland Congress leadership in the 1950s. She was a member of parliament representing the Volta Region from 1960 to 1965 and the member of parliament for Kpando from 1965 to 1966.

== Biography ==
Asamany was born on 30 July 1927 at Kpando in the Volta Region. She had her early education at Kpando Presbyterian School from 1935 to 1940 and later moved to Kumasi Government Girls' School from 1941 to 1944.

Asamany was among the first women to enter the parliament of Ghana in 1960 under the representation of the people (women members) act. She was among the 10 women who were elected unopposed on 27 June 1960 on the Convention People's Party ticket. While in parliament, she served as the deputy Minister of Labour and Social Welfare from 1961 to 1963. Prior to entering parliament, she worked at the Ministry of Labour and Social Welfare as mass education assistant.

She was an Executive Member of National Council of Ghana Women, Trustee of the Kwame Nkrumah Trust Fund and the Chairman of the Visiting Committee of Borstal Institutes.

In 1979, she founded the Mother Ghana Solidarity Party with the intention to contest for presidency in the 1979 general elections but was unable to contest as she missed the registration deadline by a few minutes because the cheque for the registration fee had delayed.

== See also ==
- List of MPs elected in the 1965 Ghanaian parliamentary election
