= Christiana Wilmot =

Ghanaian politician (born 1915)

Member of the Ghana Parliament for Shama
- In office 1965–1966
- Preceded by: Constituency split
- Succeeded by: Benjamin Edwin Quansah

Second member from the Central Region and Western Region
- In office 1960–1965
- Preceded by: New
- Succeeded by: Position abolished

Personal details
- Born: Christiana Wilmot; 24 July 1915 Gold Coast
- Party: Convention People's Party

Christiana Wilmot (24 July 1915 – before 2010) was a Ghanaian civil servant and politician. She served as a member of the Parliament of Ghana from 1960 to 1966. From 1960 to 1965, she was the Second member from the Central and Western Region, and from 1965 to 1966, she was the member of parliament for Shama.

== Early life and education ==
Born at Lower Axim town on 24 July 1915, Wilmot had her early education at the Axim Methodist School, and the York Hall School in Axim from 1924 to 1930. She furthered her education at the Government Girls' School in Cape Coast later in 1930, where she graduated in 1932.

== Career and politics ==
In 1933, she was employed by the Post and Telegraph department as a telephonist at the Exchange Section. She founded the Women Association in 1938, and served as a member of the Axim Hospital board in 1940 and 1948. In 1947, she was a founding member and Chairperson of the Axim branch of the United Gold Coast Convention (UGCC), and chairperson of the Axim branch of the People's Educational Association (PEA) from 1951 to 1952. She was the Chairperson of the women's section of the Convention People's Party (CPP), and the local councilor of the women's section of Axim. In 1954 she joined the Public Works Department (PWD), Takoradi as a telephonist and councilor, and three years later, she was made camp superintendent of the women's section of the Workers' Brigade. She was a member of the Gold Coast delegation to Peking in 1956, the Ghana delegation to Finland in 1957, the Ghana delegation to Vienna in 1958, the Ghana delegation to Geneva in 1960, the Ghana delegation to Cairo in 1961, and the Ghana delegation to West Germany in 1962.

In 1960 Wilmot was among the first women to enter the Parliament of Ghana under the representation of the people (women members) act. She was among the 10 women who were elected unopposed on 27 June 1960 on the ticket of the Convention People's Party. She was the Second Member for the Central and Western Regions. In 1965, she became the member of parliament for the Shama constituency. She worked in this capacity until 1966 when the Nkrumah government was overthrown.

== Personal life and death ==
Wilmot married her spouse in 1935. She died before 2010.
