= Stephen Willie Yeboah =

Ghanaian politician (born 1928)

Regional Commissioner for the Western Region
- In office 1965 – February 1966
- President: Dr. Kwame Nkrumah
- Preceded by: John Arthur
- Succeeded by: J. T. D. Addy

Regional Commissioner for the Ashanti Region
- In office October 1963 – 1965
- President: Dr. Kwame Nkrumah
- Preceded by: R. O. Amoako-Atta
- Succeeded by: R. O. Amoako-Atta

Regional Commissioner for the Brong Ahafo Region
- In office 1 June 1959 – 1963
- President: Dr. Kwame Nkrumah
- Preceded by: Boahene Yeboah-Afari
- Succeeded by: R. O. Amoako-Atta

Member of Parliament for Dormaa
- In office 1965 – February 1966
- Preceded by: New
- Succeeded by: Dr. Solomon Anso Manson

Member of Parliament for Sunyani West
- In office 1954–1965
- Succeeded by: Constituency abolished

Personal details
- Born: Stephen Willie Yeboah; 26 October 1928 Dormaa Akwamu, Brong Ahafo Region
- Citizenship: Ghanaian

Stephen Willie Yeboah (born 26 October 1928) was a Ghanaian politician. He served as a regional commissioner for the Brong Ahafo Region, the Ashanti Region and the Western Region. He also served as a member of parliament for the Sunyani West constituency and later the Dormaa constituency.

== Early life and education ==
Yeboah was born on 26 October 1928 at Dormaa Akwamu, Brong Ahafo Region. He had his elementary education in Dormaa Ahenkro in the Brong Ahafo Region and Bekwai in the Ashanti Region. After receiving his standard 7 certificate he continued at the Elthanus Commercial Academy in Saltpond. There, he studied shorthand, typing, book-keeping and accountancy for a period of two years.

== Career and politics ==
In 1950, Stephen joined the staff of his alma mater (Elthanus Commercial Academy) and worked there for a period of two years. Upon leaving his alma mater he joined the teaching staff of the Dormaa Ahenkro Commercial Secondary School. In 1953 he resigned to join the inspectorate staff of the Cocoa Purchasing Company.

In 1954 Stephen contested for the Sunyani West seat and won. He remained a member of parliament until the overthrow of the Nkrumah government in February 1966. On 22 May 1957 he was appointed parliamentary secretary (deputy minister) to the Ministry of Agriculture. On 1 June 1959 he was appointed Regional Commissioner (Regional Minister) for the Brong Ahafo Region and in October 1963 he was appointed Regional Commissioner for the Ashanti Region. He served in that capacity until 1965 when he was appointed Regional Commissioner for the Western Region.
