= William Ntoso =

Ghanaian politician

William Ntoso MP Esq.

Member of Parliament for Atebubu
- In office March 1957 – 24 February 1966
- Preceded by: Constituency established
- Succeeded by: Parliament suspended

Member of the Gold Coast Legislative Assembly for Atebubu
- In office 17 July 1956 – March 1957
- Preceded by: ?
- Succeeded by: Constituency disestablished

Personal details
- Party: Convention People's Party
- Other political affiliations: National Liberation Movement; United Party

William Ntoso was a Ghanaian politician who served in the Parliament of Ghana from 1957 until 1966, representing Atebubu.

== Biography ==
William Ntoso was a teacher and member of the National Liberation Movement. In the 1956 Gold Coast general election, Ntoso was elected to the Gold Coast Legislative Assembly, representing the Atebubu constituency. Ntoso received 2,970 votes in the election, defeating J. E. Buanya of the Convention People's Party and independent candidate J. G. Assare, who received 2,565 and 503 votes, respectively.

Following Ghana's independence in 1957, Ntoso continued represent the Atebubu constituency in the Parliament of Ghana. That year, Ntoso was also appointed by the Ashanti Interim Regional Assembly to the Ashanti Police Relations Committee. Ntoso joined the United Party by 1959, and later that year served as one of Ghana's representatives to the Inter-Parliamentary Union. By 1962, he joined the Convention People's Party. In the 1965 Ghanaian parliamentary election, Ntoso was re-elected to parliament unopposed, as the CPP was the sole legal party and candidates were selected by its central committee.

During his tenure in parliament, Ntoso proposed the connection of direct telephone lines to Atebubu, and supported the Ghana Police Service in a crackdown on prostitution.
