= Mary Winfred Koranteng =

Ghanaian politician (born 1922)

Member of the Ghana Parliament for Swedru-Achease
- In office 1965–1966
- Preceded by: New
- Succeeded by: Constituency abolished

Second woman member from the Eastern Region
- In office 1960–1965
- Preceded by: New
- Succeeded by: Position abolished

Personal details
- Born: Mary Winfred Koranteng; 25 December 1922 Gold Coast
- Party: Convention People's Party

Mary Winfred Koranteng (born 25 December 1922) was a Ghanaian civil servant and politician. She served as a member of the Parliament of Ghana from 1960 to 1966. From 1960 to 1965, she was the Second Member for the Eastern Region, and from 1965 to 1966, she was the member of parliament for Swedru-Achiase.

== Early life and education ==
Koranteng was born on 25 December 1922 at Achiase. She had her early education at Mmofraturo School, where she obtained her Standard Seven Certificate in 1940 upon graduation.

== Career and politics ==
Koranteng begun as a dressmaker in 1944 while keeping a store selling wax print. She remained in Achiase until 1960 when she was elected into parliament in 1960. Aside dressmaking, Koranteng was also involved in timber business, she prepared timber concessions for timber merchants. In 1960 Koranteng was among the first women to enter the Parliament of Ghana under the representation of the people (women members) act. She was among the 10 women who were elected unopposed on 27 June 1960 on the ticket of the Convention People's Party. She was the Second Member for the Eastern Region. In 1965, she was made member of parliament for Swedru-Achease until 1966 when the Nkrumah government was overthrown.

== Personal life ==
Shortly after her graduation from school she was married to Mr. Asafu-Adjei until 1943 when he died. She married once more in 1951 to Kwame Nkrumah, the first president of Ghana, and together they had a daughter. In 1955, the marriage was dissolved. She later had four other children from other associations and marriages.
