= Paul Tagoe =

Ghanaian politician

First Parliamentary Secretary
- In office 1965 – February 1966
- President: Dr. Kwame Nkrumah
- Succeeded by: Parliament Suspended

Regional Commissioner for Greater Accra
- In office August 1964 – 1965
- President: Dr. Kwame Nkrumah
- Preceded by: New
- Succeeded by: Henry Sonnie Torgbor Provencal

Member of Parliament for Ga Rural
- In office 1963–1966
- President: Kwame Nkrumah
- Preceded by: Tawia Adamafio
- Succeeded by: Alex Hutton-Mills

Personal details
- Born: Paul Nii Teiko Tagoe; 6 January 1914 Accra, Gold Coast
- Died: 1991
- Citizenship: Ghanaian
- Education: Accra Academy

Paul Nii Teiko Tagoe was a Ghanaian politician. He served as a minister of state and a member of parliament during the first republic. He was a regional commissioner (Regional Minister) for the Greater Accra Region, first parliamentary secretary and also a member of parliament for the Ga Rural electoral district.

== Early life and education ==
Tagoe was born on 6 January 1914 in Accra. He began his elementary schooling at the Koforidua Methodist School. He was later transferred to the Bishop School in Accra. He later joined the Government School and then Christ Church Grammar School. He had his secondary education at the Accra Academy.

== Career ==
After his secondary education, Tagoe gained employment at O'Reilly Institute. There he taught for a couple of years and left to take up a job as a nurse-dispenser in training. He worked as a nurse-dispenser for another couple of years then joined the Army. There, he was attached to the Royal Pay Corps. He remained with the army until 1947 when his group was demobilised. In 1948 Tagoe joined the Cocoa Marketing Board (Export Control Division). In 1952 Tagoe joined the Cocoa Purchasing Company. After three years of service he was promoted to Regional Manager. In 1956 the Cocoa Purchasing Company went into liquidation as a result of the Jibowu Commission and Paul Tagoe was relieved of his duties. In July 1960 he was appointed a Commercial Officer at the Ghana Supply Commission. He held that post until 1963.

== Politics ==
During the political agitations of the late 1940s, Tagoe joined the Convention People's Party (CPP) and was appointed Secretary of the Accra Branch of the CPP. In 1952 he was made the private secretary to the Minister of Commerce. He worked in this capacity for about 10 months before joining the Cocoa Purchasing Company. In 1956 after he was relieved of his duties at the Cocoa Purchasing Company he was employed as the private secretary to the then Regional Commissioner of the Eastern Region; Emmanuel Humphrey Tettey Korboe. After about 10 months in this position, he became the assistant national organizer of the CPP. In 1963 when Tawia Adamafio lost his seat as a member of parliament representing the Ga Rural electoral district due to the treason allegations levelled against him, Tagoe stepped into his shoes as the member of parliament representing the Ga Rural electoral district. In August 1964 he was appointed Regional Commissioner for the Greater Accra Region (Special Commissioner for Accra Rural). In 1965 he was appointed First Parliamentary Secretary. He served in this capacity until February 1966 when the Nkrumah government was overthrown.

== Personal life ==
Tagoe married Matilda Quacoo, a fishmonger in 1939 however, the marriage was dissolved in 1957. Together, they had four children. He married a second wife; Afua Amartey in 1939 this marriage also dissolved in 1959. He had two children with the latter. In 1960, he married teacher and business woman Patience Omolora Davies. Together, they had seven children and were together until Patience's death in 1989. Tagoe died two years later in 1991.
