= Emmanuel Kobla Bensah =

Ghanaian nurse and politician

Minister for Communications and Works
- In office 1961–1963
- President: Dr. Kwame Nkrumah

Minister for Works and Housing
- In office 1957–1961
- President: Dr. Kwame Nkrumah
- Preceded by: Kojo Botsio
- Succeeded by: Boahene Yeboah-Afari

Member of Parliament for Swedru
- In office 1951–1966
- President: Kwame Nkrumah

Personal details
- Born: Emmanuel Kobla Bensah; 26 June 1912 Woe, Volta Region
- Citizenship: Ghanaian

Emmanuel Kobla Bensah was a Ghanaian nurse pharmacist and politician during the first republic. He served as a nurse pharmacist in various hospitals in the Gold Coast prior to politics. As a politician he served on various ministerial portfolios in the Nkrumah government until the overthrow of Kwame Nkrumah.

== Early life and education ==
Bensah was born on 26 March 1912 at Woe, a town in the Volta Region. He had his early education at Bremen Mission Schools at Anloga and Keta where he received his standard 7 certificate in 1928. In 1930 he sat for the Common Gold Coast Entrance Examination for training as a nurse pharmacist and passed.

== Career and politics ==
Upon passing his examination he was employed at the Korle Bu Teaching Hospital. There, he began training as a nurse in 1931 and qualified as one in 1934. He later trained as a nurse pharmacist qualifying in 1937. During the period he worked as a civil servant, he served in hospitals in several parts of the Ghana (then Gold Coast) including Sefwi-Wiawso, Kumasi, Accra and Dunkwa-on-Offin. Prior to his resignation from civil service to venture private business in 1948, he was stationed at Agona Swedru.

In 1951, Bensah was elected into the legislative assembly as a member for the Agona Swedru Constituency. He was appointed Ministerial Secretary to the Ministry of Communications and Trade in 1953. In 1956, he was re-elected as a member of the legislative assembly and that same year he was posted to the Ministry of Finance still as a Ministerial Secretary until May, 1957. In June, 1957 he was promoted to minister status, he was appointed Minister of Works, a portfolio that became Minister of Works and Housing later that year. In 1961 he was appointed Minister for Construction and Communications this post later evolved into Minister of Communications and Works.

== Personal life ==
Bensah was married to Madam Dina Ayeh from 1937 to 1942. He later married Madam Annie Hughes.
