= Minister for Education (Ghana) =

This is a list of present and past ministers for education in Ghana.

== List of ministers ==
Number	Minister	Took office	Left office	Government	Party.
1	Kojo Botsio	1951	?	Nkrumah government	Convention People's Party
2	J. H. Allassani	1954	1956	Nkrumah government	Convention People's Party
3	J. B. Erzuah	1956	1957	Nkrumah government	Convention People's Party
4	C. T. Nylander (MP)	1957	1959	Nkrumah government	Convention People's Party
5	Kofi Baako (MP)	1959	1960	Nkrumah government	Convention People's Party
6	A. J. Dowuona-Hammond (MP)	1960	1964	Nkrumah government	Convention People's Party
7	Kwaku Boateng	1 May 1964	24 February 1966	Nkrumah government	Convention People's Party
8	Modjaben Dowuona	1966	1969	National Liberation Council	Military government
9	William Ofori Atta (MP)	1969	1971	Busia government	Progress Party
10	R. R. Amponsah (MP)	1971	13 January 1972	Busia government	Progress Party
11	Lieutenant-Colonel Paul Nkegbe (Education, Culture and Sport)	1972	1973	National Redemption Council	Military government
12	Colonel E. O. Nyante (Education, Culture and Sport)	1974	1976	National Redemption Council	Military government
13	E. Owusu-Fordwouh (Education, Culture and Sport)	1976	1978	Supreme Military Council	Military government
14	E. Evans Anfom (Commissioner for Education and Culture)	1979	24 September 1979	Armed Forces Revolutionary Council	Military government
15	Kwamena Ocran	1980		Limann government	People's National Party
16	Francis Kwame Buah	1980	31 December 1981	Limann government	People's National Party
17	Christina Ama Ataa Aidoo	1982	1983	Provisional National Defence Council	Military government
18	V. C. Dadson	1983		Provisional National Defence Council	Military government
19	Joyce Aryee	1985	1987	Provisional National Defence Council	Military government
20	Mohammed Ben Abdallah	1987		Provisional National Defence Council	Military government
21	K. B. Asante	1988	1990	Provisional National Defence Council	Military government
22	Mary Grant	1991	1992	Provisional National Defence Council	Military government
23	Alex Ababio	1992	1993	Provisional National Defence Council	Military government
24	Harry Sawyerr	1993	1997	Rawlings government	National Democratic Congress
25	Esi Sutherland-Addy	1997		Rawlings government	National Democratic Congress
26	Christina Amoako-Nuamah	1997	1998	Rawlings government	National Democratic Congress
27	Ekwow Spio-Garbrah	1998	7 January 2001	Rawlings government	National Democratic Congress
28	Christopher Ameyaw Akumfi (MP)	2001	2003	Kufuor government	New Patriotic Party
29	Kwadwo Baah Wiredu (MP)	2003	2005	Kufuor government	New Patriotic Party
30	Yaw Osafo-Maafo (MP)	1 February 2005	2006	Kufuor government	New Patriotic Party
31	Papa Owusu-Ankomah (MP)	28 April 2006	2007	Kufuor government	New Patriotic Party
32	Dominic Fobih (MP)	1 August 2007	7 January 2009	Kufuor government	New Patriotic Party
33	Alex Tettey-Enyo (MP)	2009	2011	Mills government	National Democratic Congress
34	Betty Mould-Iddrisu	4 January 2011	24 January 2012	Mills government	National Democratic Congress
35	E. T. Mensah (MP)	24 January 2012	February 2012	Mills government	National Democratic Congress
36	Lee Ocran	February 2012	24 October 2012	Mills government	National Democratic Congress
	Lee Ocran	24 October 2012	7 January 2013	Mahama government	National Democratic Congress
37	Jane Naana Opoku Agyemang	February 2013	6 January 2017	Mahama government	National Democratic Congress
38	Matthew Opoku Prempeh (MP)	28 January 2017	6 January 2021	Akufo-Addo government	New Patriotic Party
39	Yaw Osei Adutwum (MP)	5 March 2021	6 January 2025	Akufo-Addo government	New Patriotic Party
40	Haruna Iddrisu (MP)	22 January 2025	Incumbent	Mahama 2nd government	National Democratic Congress

== See also ==
- Ministry of Education (Ghana)
