= J. H. Allassani =

Ghanaian politician

Joseph Henry Allassani

Resident Minister of Ghana to Guinea
- In office September 1959 – 1 July 1960
- President: Kwame Nkrumah
- Preceded by: Ebenezer Ako-Adjei
- Succeeded by: Stephen Allen Dzirasa

Minister for Health
- In office June 1956 – July 1959
- President: Dr. Kwame Nkrumah
- Succeeded by: Imoru Egala

Minister for Education
- In office 21 June 1954 – June 1956
- President: Kwame Nkrumah
- Succeeded by: John Bogolo Erzuah

Member of Parliament for Saboba
- In office 1965 – February 1966
- Succeeded by: Ernest Seth Yaney

Member of Parliament for Dagomba East
- In office 1951–1965
- Succeeded by: Constituency abolished

Personal details
- Born: Joseph Henry Allassani; 1906 Gumo, British Togoland

Joseph Henry Allassani was a Ghanaian teacher and politician. He was a member of parliament and a minister of state during the first republic. He was the first health minister in the first republic of Ghana.

== Early life and education ==
Allassani was born around 1906 at Gumo a suburb of the Kumbungu District about 9 km from Tamale in the Northern Region, Ghana then a territory of Togoland under the trusteeship of the United Kingdom.

He received his elementary education at Catholic schools in Tamale, Elmina, Sunyani, and finally at St. Peter's in Kumasi. He entered the Government Teacher Training College in 1924 and graduated with his Certificate 'A' in 1926.

== Career and politics ==
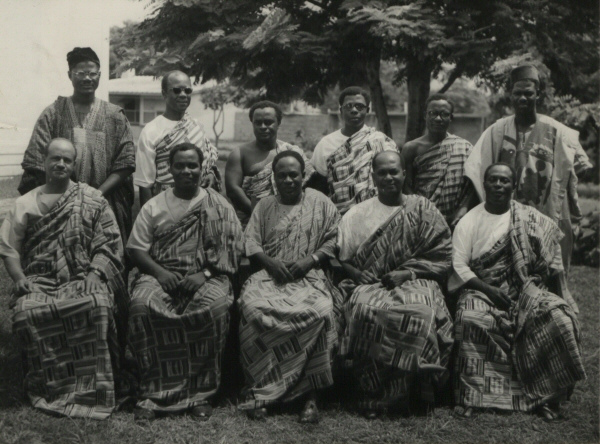
The Gold Coast Cabinet on 6 March 1957: Left to Rght front row: Hon. A. Casely-Hayford, Hon. Kojo Botsio; The Prime Minister, Hon. Kwame Nkrumah; Hon. K.A. Gbedemah, Hon. E. O. Asafu-Adjaye. Left to right back row: Hon. J. H. Allassani, Hon. N.A. Welbeck, Hon. A. Ofori Atta, Hon. Ako Adjei, Hon. J.E. Jantuah, Hon. Imoru Egala

Allassani began teaching in 1927 at St. Peter's Catholic School, Kumasi. He taught there for about twenty-two years. In 1949 he resigned to take up an appointment as secretary to the Dagomba Native Administration. That same year, he was elected into the Northern Territories Council and in 1951 he was elected to the legislative assembly as a representative of Dagomba East on the ticket of the Convention People's Party. He officially took office on 8 February 1951. On 1 April 1951, he was appointed ministerial secretary (deputy minister) to the ministry of development and on 20 June 1954 he was appointed Minister for Education, officially taking office on 21 June that year. In 1955 and 1956 he argued for the integration of Northern Togoland with the Gold Coast before the Trusteeship Council of the United Nations. He was appointed minister for health in June 1956 until September 1959 when he was appointed Ghana's Resident Minister in Guinea. He held that office until 30 June 1960 when he was appointed chairman of Rural Housing officially taking office on republic day; 1 July 1960. He served in this capacity until 1 January when he was appointed chairman of the State Paints Corporation. He held this office until February 1966 when the Nkrumah government was overthrown.

During his tenure of office as a government official, he served on various boards and committees, some which include; the Scholarship Selection Board, the Central Tender Board, the Erzuah Committee on Civil Service Salaries and the Committee on Transport in the Northern Territories. During the era of the National Liberation Council government he was sentenced to 3 months imprisonment with hard labour by two asset commissions on the conviction of perjury and contempt of Justice Apaloo's Commission.

== Personal life ==
Allassani and his wife Susana Andani had twelve children.

== See also ==
- Nkrumah government
- Minister for Health (Ghana)
- List of MLAs elected in the 1954 Gold Coast legislative election
- List of MLAs elected in the 1956 Gold Coast legislative election
- List of MPs elected in the 1965 Ghanaian parliamentary election
