= Emmanuel Kwamina Crentsil =

Ghanaian politician

Emmmmanuel Kwamina Crentsil was a Ghanaian politician. He was a member of parliament for the Ashiedu Keteke Constituency from 1965 to 1966.

Crentsil succeeded Henry Sonnie Torgbor Provencal who had then become the member of parliament for the newly created Gamashie Constituency. The new constituency was founded as a result of the increase in electoral districts from 104 to 198 electoral districts.
