= Minister for Food and Agriculture (Ghana) =

The Minister for Food and Agriculture is the Ghanaian government official responsible for the Ministry of Food and Agriculture. The Minister is responsible to government and the Parliament of Ghana for the development of Ghana's agriculture and maintaining food security in Ghana. This minister has in the past been also responsible for a Ministry of Cocoa Affairs which has now been absorbed back into the Ministry of Agriculture.

== List of ministers ==
The first Ghanaian to head this ministry was Boahene Yeboah-Afari. The current minister is Owusu Afriyie Akoto (MP).

| Number | Minister | Took office | Left office | Government | Party |
|---|---|---|---|---|---|
| 1 | Boahene Yeboah-Afari | 1956 | 1956 | Nkrumah government | Convention People's Party |
| 2 | Francis Yao Asare | 1957 | 1960 | Nkrumah government | Convention People's Party |
| 3 | Kojo Botsio | 1960 | 1962 | Nkrumah government | Convention People's Party |
| 4 | Lawrence Rosario Abavana | 1962 | 1962 | Nkrumah government | Convention People's Party |
| 5 | Krobo Edusei | 1963 | 1965 | Nkrumah government | Convention People's Party |
| 6 | F. A. Jantuah | 1965 | 24 February 1966 | Nkrumah government | Convention People's Party |
| 7 | Jacob Ofori Torto | 1967 | 1968 | National Liberation Council | Military government |
| 8 | Albert Adomakoh | 1968 | 1969 | National Liberation Council | Military government |
| 9 | Kankam Twum Barima | 1969 | 1969 | rowspan=2 | Busia government | Progress Party |
| 10 | Kwame Safo-Adu | 1969 | 13 January 1972 | | Progress Party |
| 11 | Major-General Daniel Addo | 1972 | 1973 | National Redemption Council | Military government |
| 12 | Colonel Frank Bernasko | 1973 | 1975 | National Redemption Council | Military government |
| 12 | Colonel Frank Bernasko | 1975 | 1976 | Supreme Military Council | Military government |
| 13 | Lt. Col. Paul Kwame Nkegbe | 1977 | 1979 | Supreme Military Council | Military government |
| 14 | Major General Neville Alexander Odartey-Wellington | 1979 | 1979 | Supreme Military Council | Military government |
| 15 | Colonel Samuel Akwagiram | 1979 | 4 June 1979 | Supreme Military Council | Military government |
| 16 | Abayifa Karbo | 1979 | 1979 | Armed Forces Revolutionary Council | Military government |
| 17 | E. Kwaku Twumasi | 1979 | | Limann government | People's National Party |
| 18 | E. K. Andah | | December 1980 | Limann government | People's National Party |
| 19 | Nelson Agbesi | December 1980 | 31 December 1981 | Limann government | People's National Party |
| 20 | Eugene Bortei-Doku | Jan 1982 | Dec 1983 | Provisional National Defence Council | Military government |
| 21 | John Ndebugre | 1984 | 1985 | Provisional National Defence Council | Military government |
| 22 | Isaac Adjei-Marfo | 1985 | 1986 | Provisional National Defence Council | Military government |
| 23 | Steve Obimpeh | 1986 | 1992 | Provisional National Defence Council | Military government |
| 24 | Ibrahim Issaka Adam | 1992 | 7 January 1993 | Provisional National Defence Council | Military government |
| 24 | Ibrahim Issaka Adam | 1993 | 1996 | Rawlings government | National Democratic Congress |
| 25 | Steve Obimpeh (MP) | 1996 | 1997 | Rawlings government | National Democratic Congress |
| 26 | Kwabena Agyei (MP) | 1997 | 1998 | Rawlings government | National Democratic Congress |
| 27 | J. H. Owusu-Acheampong (MP) | 1998 | 7 January 2001 | Rawlings government | National Democratic Congress |
| 28 | Courage Quashigah | 1 February 2001 | 2005 | Kufuor government | New Patriotic Party |
| 29 | Ernest Akubuor Debrah | 1 February 2005 | 7 January 2009 | Kufuor government | New Patriotic Party |
| 30 | Kwesi Ahwoi | 2009 | 24 October 2012 | Mills government | National Democratic Congress |
| 30 | Kwesi Ahwoi | 24 October 2012 | 7 January 2013 | Mahama government | National Democratic Congress |
| 31 | Clement Kofi Humado (MP) | 30 January 2013 | 16 July 2014 | Mahama government | National Democratic Congress |
| 32 | Fiifi Fiavi Franklin Kwetey (MP) | 16 July 2014 | 3 February 2016 | Mahama government | National Democratic Congress |
| 33 | Alhaji Mohammed Muniru Limuna | 3 February 2016 | 7 January 2017 | Mahama government | National Democratic Congress |
| 34 | Owusu Afriyie Akoto (MP) | 28 January 2017 | 2023 | Akufo-Addo government | New Patriotic Party |
| 35 | Bryan Acheampong (MP) | 24 March 2023 | 6 January 2025 | Akufo-Addo government | New Patriotic Party |
| 36 | Eric Opoku (MP) | 22 January 2025 | Incumbent | Mahama government 2 | National Democratic Congress |

== See also ==
- Ministry of Food and Agriculture

== External links and sources ==
- Former Heads of MOFA
