= C. T. Nylander =

Ghanaian politician

Clarkson Thomas Nylander

Member of Parliament for Ablekuma
- In office 1969–1972
- Preceded by: Sophia Doku
- Succeeded by: Adotey Nelson-Cofie

Ambassador of Ghana to Liberia
- In office 1966–1969
- President: Joseph Arthur Ankrah
- Preceded by: H. A. H. Grant
- Succeeded by: C. O. C. Amate

Ambassador of Ghana to Yugoslavia
- In office 1964–1966
- President: Dr. Kwame Nkrumah
- Preceded by: S. W. Kumah
- Succeeded by: K. B. Griwa

Ghana High Commissioner to Canada
- In office 1961–1964
- President: Dr. Kwame Nkrumah
- Succeeded by: S. P. O. Kumi

Minister of Education
- In office 1958–1959
- President: Dr. Kwame Nkrumah
- Preceded by: John Bogolo Erzuah
- Succeeded by: Kofi Baako (Minister for Information and Education)

Member of Parliament for Ga Rural
- In office 1956–1961
- Preceded by: Mabel Dove Danquah
- Succeeded by: Tawia Adamafio

Member of Parliament for Dangbe-Shai
- In office 1954–1956
- Succeeded by: Edward Ago Ackam

Personal details
- Born: Clarkson Thomas Nylander; 30 September 1905 Accra, Gold Coast

Clarkson Thomas Nylander (born 30 September 1905) was a Ghanaian educationist, diplomat and politician. He served as a minister of state and a member of parliament during the first republic. He was a minister of education and minister of state for defence. He was also a member of parliament for the Dangbe-Shai electoral district and later the Ga Rural electoral district. He later represented Ghana in various foreign missions from 1961 to 1969.

== Early life and education ==
Nylander was born in Accra. He had his early education at the Accra Methodist School and in Government schools in Accra and Kumasi. He continued at the Government Training College in Accra in 1925 as a foremost student to train as a teacher.

== Career and politics ==
Nylander begun teaching at Achimota School from 1926 to 1953. He was appointed an assistant education officer in 1952. Nylander gave up teaching to pursue a career in politics. In 1954, he was elected as a member of the Legislative Assembly for the Dangbe-Shai electoral district on the ticket of the Convention People's Party. He was re-elebcted in 1956, this time as a member for the Ga Rural electoral district. He served in this capacity for the district until 1961 when he was absorbed into foreign service. In 1956, he was appointed Ministerial Secretary (deputy minister) for the Ministry of Interior and a year later he was appointed as Minister of Education. He served in this capacity for about two years and in 1959 he was made a Minister of State for Defence. During the elections of the second republic, he stood for the Ablekuma seat on the ticket of the National Alliance of Liberals and won. He served in this capacity until 1972 when the Busia government was overthrown.

== Ambassadorial duties ==
He was appointed Ghana's High Commissioner to Canada in 1961. He served in this capacity for about three years. In 1964, he was made Ghana's ambassador to Yugoslavia. He served in this capacity until 1966 when the Nkrumah government was overthrown. He remained in foreign service serving as Ghana's ambassador to Liberia from 1966 to 1969, when the NLC government handed over power to a civilian regime.

== Personal life ==
He married Florence Nylander in January 1931. Together they had seven children. He is the father of Ladi Nylander, who was a member of the Convention People's Party (CPP) Central Committee between 2004 and 2011. He is also the father of the late Mrs. Doris Naa Lamiley Asherker Decker (née Nylander), who was formerly of the Ghana Library Board. His hobbies included music and singing.
