= Modjaben Dowuona =

Ghanaian educationist, academic and public servant

Commissioner of Education
- In office 1966–1969
- Appointed by: Joseph Arthur Ankrah
- Preceded by: Kwaku Boateng
- Succeeded by: William Ofori Atta

Personal details
- Born: January 11, 1908 Osu, Gold Coast
- Died: November 1991 (aged 83)
- Education: St. Peter's College, Oxford; University of London Institute of Education
- Profession: Teacher

Modjaben Dowuona was a Ghanaian educationist and public servant. He was the first Registrar of the University of Ghana, and also served as Ghana's Commissioner of Education (Minister) from 1966 to 1969.

== Early life and education ==
Dowuona was born at Osu on 11 January 1908. His father was Solomon Noi Dowuona, and his mother was Theodora Naa-Lomotso Dowuona, all of the Osu Royal Family in Accra. Dowuona was named "Annan" eight days after his birth. The name, according to Ga custom, is given to the fourth successive male son of a couple. His family was in Calabar, Nigeria, before his first birthday when his grandfather wrote to the family asking for his name to be changed to "Modjaben" (what sort of blood). According to his grandfather, every fourth male-born child had passed on during their infancy based on his research into the family's history. In his grandfather's opinion, an odd name could prevent the spirits from taking his life at his infancy. Dowuona entered Thompson's Kindergarten School at Osu in 1909. There, he was baptised as Theophilus Albert Modjaben Dowuona. He later dropped the Christian names while at Oxford University, in an attempt to Africanise the name. Dowuona proceeded to St. John's School at Nsawam and later moved to the Scottish Mission Primary School also at Nsawam. In 1920, he enrolled at the Scottish Mission (Presbyterian) Middle School (now Osu Salem School, Scottish missionaries took over the supervision of Presbyterian schools in the Gold Coast after the World War I). With a year to complete his primary education, Dowuona was moved to CMS Grammar School, Freetown, Sierra Leone where he had his secondary education. He graduated from the school in December 1926 with his school certificate and exemptions from the University of London Matriculation and the Oxford University Responsions. In January 1929 he entered Achimota College to study for his Intermediate bachelor's degree, there he was the first to be awarded the Achimota Council scholarship to study at the University of Oxford. At Oxford (St. Peter's College, which was then St. Peter's Hall), he studied Philosophy, Politics and Economics. He graduated with his bachelor's degree in 1934 and pursued a one-year postgraduate certificate in Education which he obtained from the University of London Institute of Education in 1935. In 1948, he was awarded his master's degree from Oxford University as part of an extramural program which was being run by the Gold Coast Government on an experimental basis.

== Career ==
Dowuona taught in various schools between 1928 and 1946. From 1945 to 1948, he was the deputy warden and lecturer at Achimota College. He was appointed Registrar of the University of Ghana in 1950 and consequently became the first Registrar of the university. He served in this capacity until 1961. He later joined the staff of Ahmadu Bello University as Registrar of the university until his political appointment in 1966. Dowuona served as Ghana's Commissioner for Education (Minister for Education) from 1966 to 1969. At the inception of the Second Republic later in 1969, he was appointed the Chairman of the National Commission for Higher Education. He held this post until 1971. He died in November 1991.

== Awards and honours ==
- Awarded an MBE in 1951.
- Received a Coronation Medal in 1953.
- Honorary doctorate degree (LLD) conferred on him by Ahmadu Bello University in 1967.
