= Doku (disambiguation) =

Jérémy Doku (born 2002) is a Belgian footballer.

Doku may also refer to:

== People ==
=== Given name ===
- Doku Umarov or Dokka Umarov (1964–2013), Chechen warlord and first emir of the Caucasus Emirate
- Doku Zavgayev (born 1940), Chechen diplomat and politician

=== Surname ===
- Elton Doku (born 1986), Albanian footballer
- Eugene Bortei-Doku (died 2000), Ghanaian agriculturist and politician
- Haki Doku (born 1969), Albanian para-cyclist
- José Kaor Dokú (1924–2022), Colombian footballer
- Nisirine Naa Ashorkor Mensah-Doku (born 1988), Ghanaian actress
- Sophia Oboshie Doku, Ghanaian politician

=== Nickname ===
- Kairi Sane (born 1988), Japanese professional wrestler and actress, known by the ring name Doku

== Other uses ==
- Lengo language, also known as Doku
