= Ashford Emmanuel Inkumsah =

Ghanaian chemist and politician

Member of the Ghana Parliament for Ahanta
- In office 1951–1966
- Succeeded by: Richard Abusua-Yedom Quarshie

Minister for Labour
- In office 1954–1959
- President: Dr. Kwame Nkrumah

Minister for Housing
- In office 1959–1960
- President: Dr. Kwame Nkrumah

3rd and 6th Minister for Interior
- In office October 1959 – October 1961
- President: Kwame Nkrumah
- Preceded by: Krobo Edusei
- Succeeded by: Kwaku Boateng
- In office June 1965 – February 1966
- President: Kwame Nkrumah
- Preceded by: Lawrence Rosario Abavana
- Succeeded by: Anthony Deku

Minister for Health
- In office 1961–1963
- President: Dr. Kwame Nkrumah

Minister for Information and Broadcasting
- In office 1963–1965
- President: Dr. Kwame Nkrumah

First deputy Speaker of Parliament
- In office 1965 – February 1966
- President: Dr. Kwame Nkrumah

Personal details
- Born: Emmanuel Ashford Inkumsah; 1900 Sekondi, Gold Coast
- Citizenship: Ghanaian
- Education: Mfantsipim School

Ashford Emmanuel Inkumsah was a Ghanaian chemist and politician. He occupied various ministerial portfolios during the first republic. He was the first deputy speaker of parliament from 1965 to 1966.

== Early life and education ==
Inkumsah was born in 1900 at Sekondi, in the Western Region, Gold Coast (now Ghana). His father was a traditional priest at Ahanta who converted to Methodism. He started schooling at the Sekondi Methodist School and continued at Mfantsipim School, Cape Coast graduating in 1921.

== Career and politics ==
In January 1922, he was employed by Messrs. Miller Brothers Limited, Kumasi as an abstract clerk. In June 1922 he joined Messrs. F. & A. Swanzy Transport for six months as a stenographer typist. He was later moved to Swanzy Trading Company where he worked as a stenographer typist until 1927, when he returned to Sekondi. In Sekondi, he worked with a firm of general merchants; Pickerings & Bethod, for two and a half years. Inkumsah trained as a pharmacist from 1931 to 1934 and in December 1934 he opened his own business; the Asfordinks Drug Store in Sekondi.

While in Sekondi, he joined the Sekondi town council and remained a member of the council for ten years. In 1949 he joined Nkrumah's Convention People's Party (CPP) at its inception. Two years later he was elected a member of parliament for the Shama Ahanta constituency on the ticket of the CPP. He was re-elected in the various parliamentary elections that were held before and after the first republic until the overthrow of the Nkrumah government. He was appointed Minister for Labour in 1951 and in 1959 he was appointed Minister for Housing. A year later he was appointed Minister for Interior. In 1961 he was made Minister for Health and in 1963 he was appointed Minister for Information and broadcasting. He served in this capacity until 1965 when he was appointed Minister for Interior and the first deputy speaker of the 1965 parliament, which lasted until 21 February 1966.

== Personal life ==
Inkumsah was married to the late Florence Inkumsah. His hobbies included shooting.
