= Richard Abusua-Yedom Quarshie =

Ghanaian diplomat and politician

Member of the Ghana Parliament for Ahanta
- In office 1969–1972
- Preceded by: Ashford Emmanuel Inkumsah

Minister for Trade and Industries
- In office 1969–1972
- President: Edward Akufo-Addo
- Prime Minister: Kofi Abrefa Busia
- Preceded by: Akwasi Afrifa
- Succeeded by: Roger Joseph Felli

Personal details
- Born: Richard Kweku Abusua-Yedom Quarshie; 6 March 1918 Ewusiadjo, Gold Coast
- Children: Hugh Quarshie
- Education: Achimota School

Richard Kweku Abusua-Yedom Quarshie was a businessman, a Ghanaian diplomat and politician. He was the minister of state in the second republic.

== Early life and education ==
Richard was born on 6 March 1918, in Ewusiadjo near Dixcove in the Western Region. He went to secondary school at Achimota School. Quarshie was trained as a Barrister at Lincoln's Inn, London.

== Career ==
Quarshie entered the Civil Service in 1940 and became a Labor Officer in 1945. In 1956, he was employed by the Foreign Service. In 1963, he was the Sub-director and Resident Director of the Consolidated African Selection Trust Ltd. (CAST), which operates in diamond mining. On 1 July 1968, Quarshie became the Founding President of the Ghana Industrial Holding Corporation (GIHOC) and later became President of the Ghana Cocoa Board.

== Diplomatic duties ==
Quarshie was one of Ghana's first diplomats. He set up missions in London and Paris. He was the Secretary of Foreign Affairs when he was sent to the Democratic Republic of Congo on 22 November 1960. He was brought to Leopoldville by Henry Templer Alexander, the then Chief of Defence Staff of the Ghana Armed Forces. This was apparently to replace Nathaniel Welbeck, the then Ghanaian chargé d'affaires to Congo. Welbeck's residence was besieged by the Congo military upon allegations that he was plotting against Mobutu's regime with the then deposed Patrice Lumumba. Quarshie was arrested in his hotel by Congolese soldiers and held for an hour.

== Politics ==
During the NLC era, Quarshie was appointed as a Commissioner for Trade and Industry. At the inception of the second republic, he was elected as member of parliament to represent Ahanta constituency in the 1st Parliament of the 2nd Republic. That same year he was appointed Minister for Trade and Industries and he remained in that position until 13 January 1972 when the Busia government was overthrown by the SMC.

== Personal life ==
He was married to Emma Wilhelmina Philips (1917–2004). He also had a traditional marriage to Elizabeth Oheneba Akua Asafu-Adjaye with whom he had five sons (Alan, Richard, James, Mordecai, and Michael Quarshie). His son Hugh Quarshie is a British actor. His hobbies included gardening, badminton, and walking. He is a Christian.
