= Francis Yao Asare =

Ghanaian politician

Volta Regional Minister
- In office 1 July 1960 – 1961
- President: Dr. Kwame Nkrumah
- Preceded by: Ferdinand Koblavi Dra Goka
- Succeeded by: Hans Kofi Boni

Minister for Food and Agriculture
- In office 1957–1960
- President: Dr. Kwame Nkrumah
- Preceded by: Kojo Botsio
- Succeeded by: Boahene Yeboah-Afari

Minister of Labour, Co-operatives and Social Welfare
- In office 1957–1957

Member of Parliament for Buem
- In office 1951–1965
- President: Kwame Nkrumah
- Preceded by: Eric Kwame Heymann

Personal details
- Born: Francis Yao Asare; 1915? Borada, Southern Togoland
- Died: 7 January 2004
- Citizenship: Ghanaian
- Education: Mfantsipim School

Francis Yao Asare was a Ghanaian pharmacist and politician. He served on various ministerial portfolios and served as a member of parliament for the Buem constituency during the first republic.

== Early life and education ==
Francis was born in Baroda in Southern Togoland. He was educated at Presbyterian School in Anum Mfantsipim School in Cape Coast.

== Career and politics ==
He trained as a druggist at the Korle Bu Teaching Hospital and worked as a pharmacist for the Ghana Civil Service from 1940 to 1947. He served on Buem Krachi Native Authority, Southern Togoland Council and was elected to the Legislative Assembly representing Buem in 1951. That same year, he was appointed Ministerial Secretary (deputy minister) for the Ministry of Housing. He was later appointed Minister of Labour, Co-operatives and Social Welfare and acting Minister for Communications. In 1957 he was appointed Minister for Food and Agriculture. He worked in that capacity until June 1960. On 1 July 1960 he was appointed Commissioner (Regional Minister) for the Volta Region. He served in this capacity until 1961. He later became Chairman of the National Food and Nutrition Board. He was re-elected to represent the Buem constituency in subsequent years until 1965 when he was sentenced to twenty-one years imprisonment on charges of the defrauding the government an amount of over £1 million. After the overthrow of the Nkrumah government Francis went into fishing and was made president of the National Inshore Boat Owners Association.

== Death ==
Francis died on 7 January 2004 at the age of 88. He was buried in his hometown; Buem.
