= Minister for Trade and Industry =

Minister for Trade and Industry may refer to:

- Minister for Trade and Industry (Ghana)
- Minister for Trade and Industry (New South Wales)
