= Ferdinand K. D. Goka =

Ghanaian teacher and politician (1919–2007)

Minister for Finance
- In office 8 May 1961 – 1964
- President: Dr. Kwame Nkrumah
- Preceded by: Komla Agbeli Gbedemah
- Succeeded by: Kwesi Amoako-Atta

Minister for Trade
- In office 1 July 1960 – 8 May 1961
- President: Dr. Kwame Nkrumah
- Preceded by: Patrick Kwame Kusi Quaidoo
- Succeeded by: Lawrence Rosario Abavana

Regional Commissioner for the Volta Region
- In office June 1959 – June 1960
- President: Dr. Kwame Nkrumah
- Succeeded by: Francis Yao Asare

Member of Parliament for Adidome
- In office 1965 – February 1966

Member of Parliament for Central Tongu
- In office 1956–1965
- Succeeded by: Constituency abolished

Personal details
- Born: Ferdinand Koblavi Dra Goka; 7 November 1919 Mafi Anfoe, Ghana
- Died: 2007 Mafi Anfoe, Ghana
- Citizenship: Ghana
- Education: Akropong Presbyterian Training College

Ferdinand Koblavi Dra Goka (1919-2007) was a Ghanaian teacher and politician. He was a Volta Regional minister, and as Ghana's second finance minister during the first republic. He is often credited as the man who changed the name of Trans Volta Togoland to the Volta Region.

== Early life and education ==
Goka was born on 7 November 1919 to Reverend F. D. Goka at Mafi Anfoe in the Volta Region. He was educated at Evangelical Presbyterian Church (E. P. C.) Middle School in Hohoe where he obtained his Cambridge School Certificate in 1941. He went on to study at the Akropong Presbyterian Training College from 1943 to 1944. He entered the Ewe Presbyterian Theological Seminary at Ho and qualified as a catechist.

== Career and politics ==
After his basic education Goka was employed as a pupil teacher in 1934 at his hometown Mafi Anfoe in the Volta Region. After qualifying as a Certificate A Grade I teacher he took an appointment at the Keta Presbyterian Middle School in January 1946. He resigned his teaching appointment in June 1948 and took office as the Assistant Education Secretary of Anlo-Tongu District Education Committee.

Goka later ventured politics and in June 1954 he was elected member of the legislative assembly and that same year he was appointed Minesterial Secretary (deputy minister) for the Ministry of Health. He was appointed Regional Commissioner for the Volta Region in June 1959 and, on 1 July 1960, he became the Minister for Trade. On 8 May 1961, he was appointed Minister for Finance and later that year, the Ministry of Trade and the Ministry of Finance were merged. On 1 October 1961, he became the Minister for Trade and Finance. He worked in that capacity until 1964 when he was replaced by Kwesi Amoako Atta.

== Death and tribute ==
He died in 2007, aged 86 or 88. Togbe Kwasinyi Agyeman IV, the Fia (Chief) of Adidome, described him as "the greatest son of Mafiland" in his funeral tribute.
