= Ben Forjoe =

Ghanaian diplomat

Commissioner for the Interior
- In office 26 June 1979 – August 1979
- President: Jerry Rawlings
- Preceded by: Benjamin Samuel Kofi Kwakye
- Succeeded by: W. C. Ekow Daniels

Ghanaian Ambassador to Togo
- In office 1973 – after 1976
- President: Colonel Acheampong

Ghanaian Ambassador to Benin
- In office 1973–?
- President: Colonel Acheampong

Personal details
- Died: 16 July 2013 (aged 92)
- Awards: Companion of the Order of the Star of Ghana

Benjamin Kofi Amoah Forjoe (died 16 July 2013) was a Ghanaian police officer, diplomat and politician.

Ben Forjoe was a police officer who also received training from Israel as a counterintelligence officer.

== Foreign service ==
Forjoe worked with the research (intelligence) bureau of the Ministry of Foreign Affairs and became the deputy director of the Research Bureau in 1961. He was later appointed the first Ghanaian director of the Research Bureau the following year. He became the head of the Passport Division of the Ministry of Foreign Affairs in November 1965. In 1973, he was appointed Ghana's Ambassador Extraordinary and Plenipotentiary to Togo and Benin by the National Redemption Council military government led by Colonel Acheampong. Another Ghanaian diplomat and writer, K. B. Asante, who also served under Kwame Nkrumah, wrote highly of Forjoe's conduct while in office, describing him as "knowledgeable and courageous".

== Security service ==
In 1963, he was appointed to the Bureau of National Investigations (then known as the Special Branch). He became its Director in 1964, a position he held until November 1965. He was earmarked by the Provisional National Defence Council (PNDC) to revamp Ghanaian security following the coup d'état on 31 December 1981 by the PNDC.

== Politics ==
Forjoe was appointed the Commissioner for Interior Affairs by the Armed Forces Revolutionary Council led by Flight Lieutenant Jerry Rawlings from June 1979 until August 1979. He was appointed Special Coordinator at the Office of the Chairman of the PNDC, which was the ruling military government in Ghana in January 1983 under Jerry Rawlings. Forjoe continued as Special Coordinator at the Office of the President on the return to constitutional rule under the National Democratic Congress of Rawlings until retiring in 1996.

== Industry ==
Following Forjoe's stint in politics, he joined Dorman Long Steel in Ghana as its managing director until 1982, when he was recalled by the Ghana government for service.

== Honours ==
In 1997, he was awarded the Companion of the Order of the Star of Ghana, the highest national award by the Government of Ghana, for his meritorious services to the country.

Political offices
Preceded by Benjamin Samuel Kofi Kwakye	Commissioner for the Interior; 1979–1979	Succeeded by W. C. Ekow Daniels
Diplomatic posts
Preceded by ?	Ghana's Ambassador to Togo; 1973–?	Succeeded by ?
Preceded by ?	Ghana's Ambassador to Benin; 1973–?	Succeeded by ?
