= Nkrumah government =

Ghanan government under Dr. Kwame Nkrumah

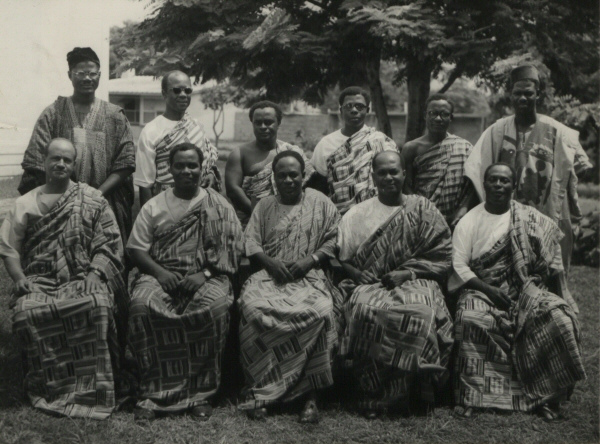
First cabinet of Kwame Nkrumah in 1957 Standing (L to R): J. H. Allassani, N. A. Welbeck, Kofi Asante Ofori-Atta, Ebenezer Ako-Adjei, J.E. Jantuah, Imoru Egala Sitting (L to R): A. Casely-Hayford, Kojo Botsio, Kwame Nkrumah, Komla Agbeli Gbedemah, E.O. Asafu-Adjaye;

Dr. Kwame Nkrumah was the first Prime Minister and first President of Ghana. Nkrumah had run governments under the supervision of the British government through Charles Arden-Clarke, the Governor-General. His first government under colonial rule started from 21 March 1952 until independence. His first independent government took office on 6 March 1957. From 1 July 1960, Ghana became a republic and Nkrumah became the first president of Ghana.

In February 1966, his government was overthrown by the National Liberation Council military coup.

== Nkrumah's independence government (1960 – 1966) ==
Portfolio	Minister	Time frame	Notes
Prime Minister	Kwame Nkrumah	6 March 1957 – 1 July 1960	
Minister for Foreign Affairs	Kwame Nkrumah	6 March 1957 – 1958	
Minister for Foreign Affairs	Kojo Botsio	1958 – 1959	
Minister for Foreign Affairs	Ebenezer Ako-Adjei	1959 – 1960	
Minister for Defence	Charles Arden-Clarke	1957 – 1958	
Minister for Defence	Stephen Allen Dzirasa	1958 – 1959	
Minister for Defence	Kwame Nkrumah	1959 – 1960	
Minister for Interior	Ebenezer Ako-Adjei	6 March 1957 – 1958	
Minister for Interior	Krobo Edusei	1958 – 1958	
Minister for Interior	Kwame Nkrumah	1958 – 1958	
Minister for Interior	A. E. Inkumsah	1959 – 1960	
Minister for Finance	Komla Agbeli Gbedemah	1954 – May 1961	
Attorney General of Ghana	G. M. Paterson	March 1957 – August 1957	
Attorney General of Ghana	Geoffrey Bing	7 August 1957 – 29 August 1961	
Minister for Health	J. H. Allassani	6 March 1957 – ?	
Minister for Local Government	A.E.A. Ofori Atta	6 March 1957 – ?	
Minister for Education	John Bogolo Erzuah	6 March 1957 – 22 May 1957	
Minister for Education	C. T. Nylander	22 May 1957 – 1958	
Minister for Education and Information	Kofi Baako	August 1957 – 1959	
Minister for Agriculture	Boahene Yeboah-Afari	6 March 1957 – 22 May 1957	
Minister for Housing	A. E. Inkumsah	6 March 1957 – ?	
Minister for Trade and Labour (later Minister for Commerce and Industry)	Kojo Botsio	6 March 1957 – 1958	
Minister for Communications	Archie Casely-Hayford	6 March 1957 – 22 May 1957	
Minister for Works	N. A. Welbeck	6 March 1957 – 22 May 1957	
Minister for Works	Emmanuel Kobla Bensah	22 May 1957 – 1960	
Minister for Labour, Co-operatives and Social Welfare (created in May 1957)	Francis Yao Asare	22 May 1957 – ?	
Volta Regional Minister	C. H. Chapman	November 1957 – June 1959	
Volta Regional Minister	Ferdinand Goka	June 1959 – June 1960	
Resident Minister in Guinea	N. A. Welbeck	1958 – February 1959	
Minister without Portfolio	L. R. Abavana	6 March 1957 – ?	
Minister without Portfolio	Krobo Edusei	6 March 1957 – 1958	
Minister without Portfolio	Kofi Baako	22 May 1957 – 1958	
Minister without Portfolio	N. A. Welbeck	22 May1957 – ?	
Minister without Portfolio	John Bogolo Erzuah	22 May1957 – ?	
Minister without Portfolio	Archie Casely-Hayford	22 May1957 – ?	
Minister without Portfolio	Boahene Yeboah-Afari	22 May1957 – ?	

== Nkrumah's republican government (1960 – 1966) ==
Ghana became a republic on 1 July 1960. A referendum in February 1964 on Ghana becoming a one-party state resulted in a landslide victory for the Kwame Nkrumah and the CPP government. There were hardly any votes against the one-party state in all the regions. A year later in June 1965, all 198 candidates of the CPP for parliament were elected unopposed. In February 1965, Nkrumah reshuffled made a big change to his government. Twelve new ministers were appointed and many others changed portfolios.

Portfolio	Minister	Time frame	Notes
President	Kwame Nkrumah	1 July 1960 – 24 February 1966	
Minister for Foreign Affairs	Imoru Egala	1960 – 1961	
Minister for Foreign Affairs	Ebenezer Ako-Adjei	1961 – 1962	
Minister for Foreign Affairs	Kwame Nkrumah	1962 – 1963	
Minister for Foreign Affairs	Kojo Botsio	1963 – 1965	
Minister for Foreign Affairs	Alex Quaison-Sackey	1965 – 1966	
Minister for Defence	Charles de Graft Dickson	1960 – 1961	
Minister for Defence	Kofi Baako	September 1961 – 24 February 1966	
Minister for Interior	A. E. Inkumsah	1960 – 1961	
Minister for Interior	Kwaku Boateng (Interior and Local Government)	1961 – 1964	
Minister for Interior	L. R. Abavana	1964 – 1965	
Minister for Interior	A. E. Inkumsah	1 February 1965 – 1965	
Minister for Interior	L. R. Abavana	1965 – 1966	
Minister for Finance	Komla Agbeli Gbedemah	1954 – May 1961	
Minister for Finance	Ferdinand Koblavi Dra Goka (Minister for Finance and Trade)	8 May 1961 – February 1964	
Minister for Finance	Kwame Nkrumah	February 1964 – ?	
Minister for Finance	Kwesi Amoako-Atta	1965 – 1966	
Attorney General and Minister for Justice	Geoffrey Bing; A. E. A. Ofori-Atta	7 August 1957 – 29 August 1961 c. 1962 – 1965	
Attorney General and Minister for Justice	George Commey Mills-Odoi	30 September 1961 – 29 August 1962	
Attorney General and Minister for Justice	B. E. Kwaw-Swanzy	1962 – February 1966	
Minister for Health	L. R. Abavana	1960 – 1961	
Minister for Health	Komla Agbeli Gbedemah	June 1961 – ?	
Minister for Health	A. E. Inkumsah	c. 1962 – 1963	
Minister for Health	L. R. Abavana	1963 – 1964	
Minister for Health	Joseph Kodzo	c. 1965	
Minister for Health	Osei Owusu Afriyie	c. 1966	
Minister for Local Government	A.E.A. Ofori Atta	6 March 1957 – ?	
Minister for Local Government	Mumuni Bawumia (Municipal and Local Councils)	1 February 1965 – ?	
Minister for Education and Social Welfare	Alfred Jonas Dowuona-Hammond	c. 1960-1964	
Minister for Education and Social Welfare	Kwaku Boateng (Science and Higher Education)	1964 – February 1966	
Minister for Social Welfare	P. K. K. Quaidoo	c. 1961	
Minister for Social Welfare	Osei Owusu Afriyie (Labour and Social Welfare)	c. 1962 & 1965	
Minister for Social Welfare	Susanna Al-Hassan (Social Welfare and Community Development)	1 February 1965 – ?	First female Ghanaian minister
Minister for Labour	K. Amoa-Awuah	1 February 1965 – ?	
Minister for Agriculture	Francis Yao Asare	1960	
Minister for Agriculture	Kojo Botsio	1960 – 1962	
Minister for Agriculture	L. R. Abavana	1962	
Minister for Agriculture	Krobo Edusei (Food and Agriculture)	1963 – 1965	
Minister for Agriculture	F. A. Jantuah	1965 – 1966	
Minister for Works and Housing	E. K. Bensah	22 May 1957 – c. 1965	
Minister for Works	E. K. Bensah (Minister for Works and Communications)	1963 – 1965	
Minister for Housing	F. E. Techie-Menson	1 February 1965 – ?	
Minister for Construction and Communication	E. K. Bensah	c. 1962	
Minister for Trade	Ferdinand Goka	1 July 1960 – 8 May 1961	
Minister for Trade	L. R. Abavana	June 1961 – ?	
Minister for Trade	A. Y. K. Djin	c. 1965	
Minister for Overseas Trade	Osei Owusu Afriyie	1965	
Minister for Overseas Trade	Kwesi Armah	1965 – 24 February 1966	
Minister for Industries	Krobo Edusei	c. 1962	
Minister for Industries	Imoru Egala	c. 1963 – 1965	
Minister for Transport and Communications	Krobo Edusei	? – ?	
Minister for Transport and Communications	A. J. Dowuona-Hammond	c. 1965 – c. 1966	
Minister for Information	Kwaku Boateng	? – ?	
Minister for Information	Tawia Adamafio (Minister for Information and Broadcasting)	1960 – 1962	
Minister for Information	L. R. Abavana (Minister for Information and Broadcasting)	c. 1963	
Minister for Information	Imoru Egala	1962 – 1965	
Minister for Information and Party Propaganda	N. A. Welbeck	1 February 1965 –?	
Minister for Lands	A. K. Puplampu	1 February 1965 – February 1966	
Minister for Mines and Mineral Resources	L. R. Abavana (Minister for Mines)	February 1965 – June 1965	
Minister for Mines and Mineral Resources	K. O. Thompson	June 1965 – February 1966	
Minister for Art and Culture	J. Benibengor-Blay	1 February 1965 – 1966	
Minister for Co-operatives	S. A. Kwaku Bonsu	1 February 1965 – 1965	
Minister for Food and Nutrition	Joseph Kodzo	1 February 1965 – ?	
Minister for Food and Nutrition	Hans Kofi Boni	c. November 1965	
Minister for Fuel and Power	E. I. Preko	1 February 1965 – ?	
Minister for Parks and Gardens	E. Nee Ocansey	1 February 1965 – ?	
Minister for Pensions and National Insurance	A. K. Onwona-Agyeman	1 February 1965 – ?	
Minister for Parliamentary Affairs	Kofi Baako	c. 1961	
Minister for Presidential Affairs	Tawia Adamafio	1961 – ?	
Minister resident in Guinea	Stephen Allen Dzirasa	July 1960 – 1962	
Minister resident in Guinea	Kweku Budu-Acquah	c. 1963	
Minister resident in Guinea	D. K. Kulevome	? – ?	
Regional Commissioners
Ashanti Regional Commissioner	Charles de Graft Dickson (MP)	1957 – DEc 1959	
Ashanti Regional Commissioner	R. O. Amoako-Atta (MP)	Dec 1959 – July 1960	
Ashanti Regional Commissioner	Osei Owusu Afriyie (MP)	1960 – 1961	
Ashanti Regional Commissioner	R. O. Amoako-Atta (MP)	Nov 1961 – Oct 1963	
Ashanti Regional Commissioner	Stephen Willie Yeboah (MP)	Oct 1963 – 1965	
Ashanti Regional Commissioner	R. O. Amoako-Atta (MP)	1965 – Feb 1966	
Brong Ahafo Regional Commissioner	Stephen Willie Yeboah (MP)	Jun 1959 – Oct 1963	
Brong Ahafo Regional Commissioner	R. O. Amoako-Atta (MP)	1963 – 1965	
Central Regional Commissioner	J. E. Hagan	c. 1961-1964	
Eastern Regional Commissioner	Emmanuel Humphrey Tettey Korboe	1957 – 1965	
Eastern Regional Commissioner	J. E. Hagan (MP)	1965 – 1966	
Greater Accra Regional Commissioner	Paul Teiko Tagoe	? – ?	
Northern Regional Commissioner	Emmanuel Adama Mahama	c. 1964	
Upper Regional Commissioner	Ayeebo Asumda	c. 1963-1964	
Volta Regional Commissioner	Francis Yao Asare	c. 1961	
Volta Regional Commissioner	Hans Kofi Boni	1961 — 1965	
Volta Regional Commissioner	Joseph Kodzo		
Western Regional Commissioner	John Arthur	c. 1963-1964	

== See also ==
- Convention People's Party

Preceded by Colonial government	Government of Ghana; 1957 – 1966	Succeeded by National Liberation Council, 1966-1969 (Military regime)
