= Krobo Edusei =

Ghanaian politician

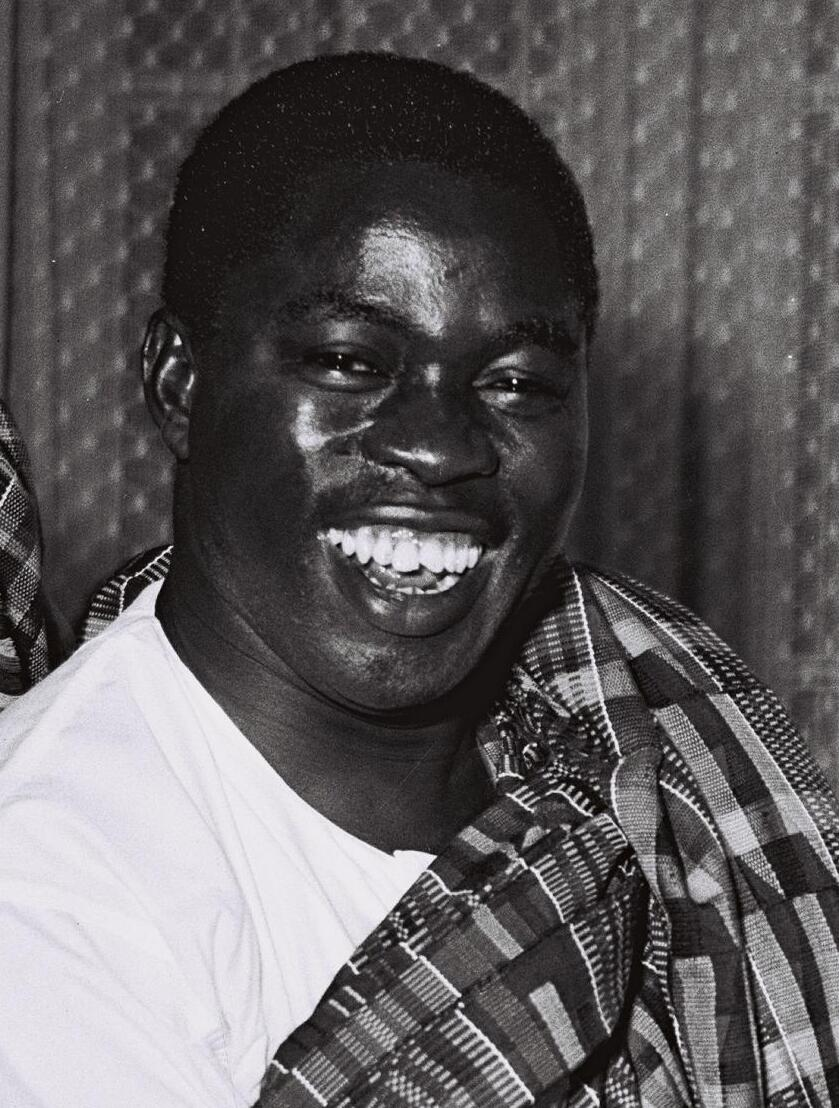
- Edusei in 1959

Minister for Agriculture
- In office 1963–1965
- President: Kwame Nkrumah
- Preceded by: L. R. Abavana
- Succeeded by: F. A. Jantuah

Minister for the Interior
- In office November 1957 – October 1959
- Prime Minister: Kwame Nkrumah
- Preceded by: Ako Adjei
- Succeeded by: A. E. Inkumsah

Minister without portfolio
- In office 6 March 1957 – 1958
- Prime Minister: Kwame Nkrumah

Personal details
- Born: December 26, 1915 Ampabame, Ashanti Region, Gold Coast
- Died: 13 February 1984 (aged 68)
- Party: Convention People's Party

Krobo Edusei (26 December 1915 – 13 February 1984) was a Ghanaian politician, who held several ministerial offices in Kwame Nkrumah's government.

== Biography ==
=== Early life ===
Krobo Edusei was born in the village of Ampabame, Ashanti Region, to Kwabena Edusei and Ama Darkowah. He grew up at the court of a sub-chieftain of the Ashanti Kingdom. After receiving his elementary education at the Government Boys' School in Kumasi, Edusei started working as a medicine salesman in the rural areas of Ashanti and the Western Region. In the early 1940s he also worked as a vendor and occasional reporter for a regional newspaper, the Ashanti Pioneer.

=== Political career ===
In July 1947 Edusei was a founding member of the Ashanti Youth Association (AYA); the AYA was opposed the collaboration between traditional chiefs and the colonial authorities, and soon aligned itself with the United Gold Coast Convention (UGCC), the main nationalist organization at the time. In June 1949 the Convention People's Party (CPP) was formed by members of the youth faction of the UGCC, led by Kwame Nkrumah, following a split with the latter organization's conservative leadership. Edusei served on the CPP's Central Committee, and was also propaganda secretary of the party in the Ashanti Region.

Edusei was jailed by the colonial authorities in 1950 for his participation in the Positive Action campaign led by Nkrumah. Upon his release Edusei joined the CPP campaign for the 1951 general election, where he was elected to the Legislative Assembly. He remained loyal to the CPP, unlike many of his former colleagues, who formed the Ashanti-dominated National Liberation Movement out of disaffection with the CPP; this led his family to become victims of NLM-inspired violence, including a bombing which killed his sister in late 1955.

=== Post-independence ===
After Ghana's independence with Nkrumah as prime minister in 1957, Edusei held several ministerial offices; he was at different times minister of interior, transport and communications, agriculture, and a minister without portfolio. His short tenure in some of these offices were related to charges of corruption which were frequently made against him, including when his wife, Mary Jackson, reportedly bought a gold bed worth £ 3000 from London. Despite this, his charisma and flamboyant style helped him to remain a popular politician.

Following the 1966 coup d'état which overthrew Nkrumah, Edusei was imprisoned and found guilty of corruption by a commission of inquiry. After his release, he was barred from participating in the 1969 parliamentary election. Edusei returned to some level of political activity toward the end of the 1970s, and helped found the People's National Party (PNP), which won the 1979 general election.

After the 1981 coup d'état overthrew the constitutional rule of the PNP, Edusei was tried for his involvement in a business deal and given an 11-year prison sentence in August 1982. He was released on health grounds after two years, and died shortly thereafter.

== Personal life ==
Edusei was married to Mary Jackson, with whom he had twelve children.

Political offices
New title	Minister without portfolio 1957	Assigned portfolio
Preceded by Ebenezer Ako-Adjei	Minister for the Interior; 1957 – 1958	Succeeded by A. E. Inkumsah
Preceded by ?	Minister for Transport and Communications ? – ?	Succeeded by ?
Preceded by Lawrence Rosario Abavana	Minister for Agriculture; 1963 – 1965	Succeeded by F. A. Jantuah
