= Minister for the Interior (Ghana) =

The Minister for the Interior is the Ghanaian government official responsible for the Ministry of Interior. He is thus responsible for internal security and law and order in Ghana. The most recent person in this position is Hon.Ambrose Dery. The position has also been known as Minister for Internal Affairs in the past.

== List of ministers ==
The first Ghanaian to head this ministry was Ebenezer Ako-Adjei. He was also one of The Big Six instrumental in Ghana attaining its independence from the United Kingdom.

Number	Minister	Took office	Left office	Government	Party
1	Ebenezer Ako-Adjei (MP)	Mar 1957	Nov 1957	Nkrumah government	Convention People's Party
2	Krobo Edusei (MP)	Nov 1957	Oct 1959	Nkrumah government	Convention People's Party
3	Ashford Emmanuel Inkumsah (MP)	Oct 1959	Oct 1961	Nkrumah government	Convention People's Party
4	Kwaku Boateng (MP)	Oct 1961	May 1964	Nkrumah government	Convention People's Party
5	Lawrence Rosario Abavana (MP)	May 1964	Jun 1965	Nkrumah government	Convention People's Party
6	Ashford Emmanuel Inkumsah (MP)	Jun 1965	Feb 1966	Nkrumah government	Convention People's Party
7	Anthony Deku	Feb 1966	Mar 1969	National Liberation Council	Military government
8	John Willie Kofi Harlley	Mar 1969	Aug 1969	National Liberation Council	Military government
9	Simon Diedong Dombo (MP)	Sep 1969	Feb 1971	Busia government	Progress Party
10	Nicholas Yaw Boafo Adade (MP)	Feb 1971	Jan 1972	Busia government	Progress Party
11	J. H. Cobbina	Jan 1972	Sep 1974	National Redemption Council	Military government
12	Ernest Ako	Sep 1974	Oct 1975	National Redemption Council	Military government
12	Ernest Ako	Oct 1975	Jul 1978	Supreme Military Council	Military government
13	Benjamin Samuel Kofi Kwakye	Jul 1978	Jun 1979	Supreme Military Council	Military government
14	Ben Forjoe	Jun 1979	Aug 1979	Armed Forces Revolutionary Council	Military government
15	W. C. Ekow Daniels	Aug 1979	Sep 1979	Armed Forces Revolutionary Council	Military government
15	W. C. Ekow Daniels	Sep 1979	Sep 1981	Limann government	People's National Party
16	Kwame Sanaa-Poku Jantuah	Sep 1981	Dec 1981	Limann government	People's National Party
17	Johnny F. S. Hansen	Jan 1982	Apr 1982	Provisional National Defence Council	Military government
18	Colonel J. M. Ewa	Apr 1982	Dec 1982	Provisional National Defence Council	Military government
19	Kofi Djin	Dec 1982	Nov 1985	Provisional National Defence Council	Military government
20	Major General Winston Mensa-Wood	Nov 1985	Oct 1987	Provisional National Defence Council	Military government
21	Nii Okaidja Adamafio	Oct 1987	May 1991	Provisional National Defence Council	Military government
22	Nana Akuoko Sarpong	May 1991	Mar 1992	Provisional National Defence Council	Military government
23	Emmanuel Osei-Owusu	Mar 1992	Jan 1993	Provisional National Defence Council	Military government
23	Emmanuel Osei-Owusu	Jan 1993	Oct 1996	Rawlings government	National Democratic Congress
24	Mahama Iddrisu	Nov 1996	Feb 1997	Rawlings government	National Democratic Congress
25	Nii Okaidja Adamafio	Feb 1997	Jan 2001	Rawlings government	National Democratic Congress
26	Malik Al-Hassan Yakubu	Feb 2001	Mar 2002	Kufuor government	New Patriotic Party
(acting)	Kwame Addo-Kufuor (MP)	Apr 2002	Apr 2003	Kufuor government	New Patriotic Party
27	Hackman Owusu-Agyeman (MP)	Apr 2003	Feb 2005	Kufuor government	New Patriotic Party
28	Papa Owusu-Ankomah (MP)	Feb 2005	May 2006	Kufuor government	New Patriotic Party
29	Albert Kan Dapaah (MP)	May 2006	Aug 2007	Kufuor government	New Patriotic Party
30	Kwamena Bartels (MP)	Aug 2007	May 2008	Kufuor government	New Patriotic Party
31	Kwame Addo-Kufuor (MP)	Jun 2008	Jan 2009	Kufuor government	New Patriotic Party
32	Cletus Avoka (MP)	Feb 2009	Feb 2010	Mills government	National Democratic Congress
33	Martin Amidu	Feb 2010	Jan 2011	Mills government	National Democratic Congress
34	Benjamin Kunbuor (MP)	Jan 2011	Feb 2012	Mills government	National Democratic Congress
35	William Kwasi Aboah	Apr 2012	Jul 2012	Mills government	National Democratic Congress
35	William Kwasi Aboah	Jul 2012	Jan 2013	Mahama government	National Democratic Congress
36	Kwesi Ahwoi	Feb 2013	Jul 2014	Mahama government	National Democratic Congress
37	Mark Owen Woyongo (MP)	Jul 2014	19 January 2016	Mahama government	National Democratic Congress
38	Prosper Douglas Bani	19 January 2016	6 January 2017	Mahama government	National Democratic Congress
39	Ambrose Dery (MP)	28 January 2017	14 February 2024	Akufo-Addo government	New Patriotic Party
40	Henry Quartey (MP)	14 February 2024	6 January 2025	Akufo-Addo government	New Patriotic Party
41	Mubarak Mohammed Muntaka (MP)	30 January 2025	Incumbent	Mahama 2nd government	

== See also ==
- Ministry of Interior (Ghana)
