= F. K. Buah =

Ghanaian author, historian and politician

Francis Kwame Buah

Minister for Education
- In office 1980 – 31 December 1981
- President: Hilla Limann
- Preceded by: K. K. Anti
- Succeeded by: Ama Ata Aidoo

Minister for Trade and Tourism
- In office 1979–1980
- President: Hilla Limann
- Preceded by: J. L. S. Abbey

Francis Kwame Buah was a Ghanaian historian, educationist, author and politician. He was the Minister for Education of Ghana between 1980 and 1981 and the Minister for Trade and Tourism prior to that. He authored a number of history text books.

== Educational career ==
Buah was the headteacher of the Tema Senior High School (formerly Tema Secondary School) in Ghana.

== Politics ==
In 1979, Buah was appointed by Hilla Limann, who was the president of Ghana as the Minister for Trade and Industry. In 1980, he was moved to be the Minister for Education. He held this position until the Limann government was overthrown by the Armed Forces Revolutionary Council led by Jerry Rawlings in December 1981. He has published many history text books. The last, "Government in West Africa" was published when he was 83 years old.

== Publications ==
- Buah, F. K. (1 January 1961). Objective questions and answers in history. Macmillan St.Martin's.
- Buah, F. K. (1 January 1963). History for Ghana schools. Macmillan.
- Davidson, Basil; Buah, F. K. (1967). The growth of African civilization: a history of West Africa 1000-1800. London: Longmans. ISBN 978-0582602434.
- Buah, F. K. (1 January 1977). West Africa since AD 1000: The People. Macmillan.
- Buah, F. K. (1 January 1977). West Africa since AD 1000: The People and Outsiders. Macmillan.
- Buah, F. K. (1980). A history of Ghana. London: Macmillan. ISBN 978-0333295151.

Party political offices
Preceded by K. K. Anti	Minister for Education; 1980 - 1981	Succeeded by Ama Ata Aidoo
Preceded by J. L. S. Abbey	Minister for Trade and Tourism; 1979 - 1980	Succeeded by ?
