= Kwesi Plange =

Ghanaian politician and educationist

Kwasi Plange
- Born: 1926; Cape Coast
- Died: 1953 (aged 26–27)
- Occupation: Politician
- Title: Member of the Gold Coast Legislative Assembly
- Successor: Nathaniel Azarco Welbeck
- Political party: Convention People's Party
- Mother: Charlotte Bart Plange

Kwesi Plange (Akan pronunciation: [kʷɪˈsi ˈplaⁿdʒe]; 1926 – 1953) was a Ghanaian politician and educationist, He was a founding member of the Convention People's Party (CPP) and the first headmaster of Ghana National College.

== Career and politics ==
He was a teacher of St. Augustine's College in Cape Coast; his teaching appointment was terminated by the colonial government based on recommendations of the Quarshie-Idun Commission, the commission was set up to investigate the protest of students in Cape Coast schools following the detention in 1948 of "The Big Six". Together with three other teachers, they founded the Ghana National College and Plange become the college's first headteacher from 1948 to 1950.

Plange was active in the politics of the Gold Coast, he was a member of the United Gold Coast Convention. When Kwame Nkrumah founded the Convention People's Party on 12 June 1949, he joined the convention and was a member of its first Central Committee. In 1951, he was elected to the legislative assembly to represent Cape Coast municipality on the ticket of CPP. Being the youngest member of the assembly and he fought for the inclusion of the youth in the politics of the Colony. He proposed amendment to the Coussey Constitution to reduce the voting age from 25 to 21. He was the Ministerial Secretary to the Ministry of Local Government and led the formulation of the Local Governance Ordinance.

== Death ==
Plange died in 1953. He was replaced on the central committee and the legislative council by Nathaniel Azarco Welbeck.

== See also ==
- Convention People's Party
