= F. A. Jantuah =

Ghanaian lawyer and politician (1929–2020)

Franklin Adubobi Jantuah

Member of the Ghana Parliament for Ejisu
- In office 1965–1966

Minister of Agriculture
- In office 1965–1966
- President: Dr. Kwame Nkrumah
- Preceded by: Krobo Edusei
- Succeeded by: Jacob Ofori Torto

Minister for Local Government
- In office 1984–1986
- President: John Rawlings

Personal details
- Born: Franklin Adubobi Jantuah; 1929 Kumasi, Ashanti Region, Gold Coast
- Died: 27 January 2020 (aged 90–91)
- Education: University of London

Franklin Adubobi Jantuah (1929 – 27 January 2020) was a Ghanaian lawyer and politician. He was the Minister of State in the first republic and in the Provisional National Defence Council. He served as the Minister of Agriculture in the Nkrumah government and Minister for Local Government in the PNDC regime.

== Early life and education ==
Jantuah was born in 1929 in Kumasi, the capital of the Ashanti Region. He had his early education at English Church Mission School in Kumasi and Asante College also in Kumasi from 1943 to 1944. He continued at Adisadel College, Cape Coast from 1945 to 1947. He proceeded to Korle-Bu Dispensing School in 1947 where he obtained a certificate in Pharmacy in 1948. In 1954, he left for England to study at the London Tutorial College and the University of London from 1956 to 1959. He studied law at the Inns of Court School of Law and was called to the bar at the Middle Temple, London.

== Career and politics ==
He began legal practice in 1960. He entered the parliament in 1965 representing the Ejisu constituency during the first republic. On 13 June that same year, he was appointed Minister for Agriculture; a position he served in until February 1966 when the Nkrumah government was overthrown. During the Acheampong regime, he became a leading member of the People's Movement for Freedom and Justice (PMFJ); a political group that opposed the union government (Unigov) idea that was proposed by Ignatius Kutu Acheampong and his government.

In 1974, he became a member of the Kumasi City Council and in 1983 became the chairman of the council equivalent to Mayor of Kumasi. He consequently became the Ashanti Regional secretary (Ashanti Regional minister) in the PNDC regime and in 1984 he was appointed Secretary for Local Government (minister for Local Government). He served in this capacity until 1986 when he was relieved of his duties on health grounds.

== Personal life ==
He was the brother of Kwame Sanaa-Poku Jantuah; who was also a Ghanaian politician, and the father of the late Kojo Svedstrup Jantuah, a Ghanaian activist and author, and Nana Yaa Jantuah formerly of the Public Utility and Regulatory Commission as Public and Corporate Affairs Director. He died on Monday 27 January 2020 at the Komfo Anokye Teaching Hospital.

== See also ==
- Minister for Food and Agriculture (Ghana)
- Kwame Sanaa-Poku Jantuah
