= Ministry of Trade and Industry (Ghana) =

Government ministry of Ghana

Ministry of Trade and Industry (MOTI) is a government ministry of Ghana, headquartered in Accra.

The Minister for Trade and Industry is the Ghana government official responsible for running the ministry.

The ministry is responsible for advising the government on the private sector development, trade and the industry formation within the local and the international front. it also sees to the formulation and implementation of policies as well as representing the government in the international duties and bodies like the World Trade Organization. The ministry has eight division headed by the Chief Director and have three other units that aid in the smooth running of the ministry namely- legal, Internal audit and Communications and Public Affairs.

The Ministry works to ensure that Ghana gains the greatest possible benefits from its international trade partnerships while maintaining an efficient and well regulated domestic trading system. It is also responsible for fostering strong trade relationships with friendly nations on a most favored nation basis, in line with Ghana's obligations under the World Trade Organization (WTO).

To expand the country's economic opportunities, the Ministry prioritizes diversifying export markets and broadening the range of export commodities by supporting the growth of non-traditional export industries. This strategy is aimed at building a resilient, export-driven economy. In the industrial sector, the Ministry focuses on promoting a competitive manufacturing base capable of producing value-added goods from locally available resources, thereby enhancing Ghana's competitiveness in international markets.

== History ==
Following Ghana's independence in 1957, state-led industrialization was prioritized to build domestic manufacturing capabilities. Commercial and industrial policies were managed across evolving ministerial portfolios (such as the Ministry of Commerce and Industry) to reduce reliance on foreign imports and promote local processing. The modern Ministry was formally established under the 1992 Constitution of Ghana and the Civil Service Law. It was structured to transition Ghana towards a competitive, market-driven and export-oriented economy. Over the past two decades, Ministry of Trade and Industry has spearheaded major industrial programs such as the One District, One Factory (1D1F) initiative, the Private Sector Development Strategy(PSDS) and the expansion of non-traditional exports. It also plays a key role in integrating Ghana into international Frameworks like the World Trade Organization (WTO) and housing the Secretariat for the African Continental Free Trade Area (ACFTA).

== Agencies ==
Ministry agencies include;

- Ghana Export Promotion Authority (GEPA) located at 9th, 10th and 11th Floor, Africa Trade House, Cruickshank Road, West Ridge
- Ghana Enterprises Agency (GEA) located at 27Dr.Quartey Papafio Street, Opposite Holi Flats, Airport, Accra
- Rural Enterprises Program (REP) located at Grains and Legumes Dev't.Board Building, Off Lake Road, Near Garden City Radio, Kumasi, Ghana
- Ghana Accreditation Service (GHAS) located in Accra

== Functions of the Ministry ==
- Formulate and coordinate policies that promote collaboration across sectors to ensure the effective implementation of trade and industrial policies at both the national and international levels, while enhancing entrepreneurial skills, technological capacity and access to finance and markets.
- Design and implement programs that strengthen institutional capacity to address the demands and challenges of the global economy.
- Establish and promote quality standards and assurance systems that enable goods and services to meet both domestic and international production requirements.
- Support the growth and promotion of non-traditional export products to enhance Ghana's export performance.
- Promote the expansion of the country's production capacity and facilitate cross-border trade to boost economic growth.
- Gather, analyze, manage and disseminate accurate and timely information to stakeholders to support informed decision making.
- Identify and eliminate institutional and legal constraints that hinder trade, industrial development and investment.
- Improve access to financial resources and capital for private sector businesses.
- Ensure that private sector development initiatives are well coordinated and responsive to the diverse needs of business.
- Encourage greater private sector participation in the delivery of public services where appropriate.

== Responsibilities of the Ministry ==
The Ministry is responsible for carrying out the following key responsibilities:

- Developing and implementing policies that guide the growth and regulation of the trade and industrial sectors.
- Supporting the establishment, growth and sustainable of enterprises, particularly Micro, Small and Medium Enterprises (MSMEs).
- Establishing, monitoring and enforcing standards that promote quality, safety and competitiveness in trade and industry.
- Promoting both domestic and international trade by encouraging product diversification and value addition to enhance Ghana's export competitiveness.
- Strengthening Ghana's participation in regional and global trade by engaging in multilateral and plurilateral trade agreements while expanding access to international markets.
- Creating an enabling environment that supports the growth, competitiveness and development of the private sector.
- Encouraging innovation and entrepreneurship across both the formal and informal sectors to improve productivity and drive economic growth.
- Implementing programs and initiatives that promote production, commercial activities and the creation of sustainable employment opportunities

== List of Ghanaian Trade Ministers ==
Number	Minister	Took office	Left office	Government	Party
1	Kojo Botsio (MP)	1957	1958	Nkrumah government	Convention People's Party
2	Patrick Kwame Kusi Quaidoo (MP)	1958	1960	Nkrumah government	Convention People's Party
3	Ferdinand Koblavi Dra Goka (MP)	July 1960	May 1961	Nkrumah government	Convention People's Party
4	Lawrence Rosario Abavana (MP)	May 1961	October 1961^{a}	Nkrumah government	Convention People's Party
5	R.S. Amegashie	1966	1969	National Liberation Council	Military government
6	R. A. Quarshie (MP)	1969	1972	Busia government	Progress Party
7	Roger Joseph Felli	1972		National Redemption Council	Military government
8	Colonel Kobina Adduah Quashie	1975	1979	Supreme Military Council	Military government
9	J.L.S. Abbey (acting)	1979	1979	Armed Forces Revolutionary Council	Military government
10	Francis Kwame Buah	1979	1980	Limann government	People's National Party
11	Vincent Y. Bulla	1980		Limann government	People's National Party
12	K. B. Asante	1982	1986	Provisional National Defence Council	Military government
13	Kofi Djin	1986	1992	Provisional National Defence Council	Military government
14	Huudu Yahaya	c. 1988	c. 1988	Provisional National Defence Council	Military government
15	John Bawa	1992	Jan 1993	Provisional National Defence Council	Military government
16	Emma Mitchell		Jan 1996	Rawlings government	National Democratic Congress
17	John Frank Abu		Jan 2000	Rawlings government	National Democratic Congress
18	Dan Abodakpi (MP)	Jan 2000	Jan 2001	Rawlings government	National Democratic Congress
19	Kofi Konadu Apraku (MP)	2001	2003	Kufuor government	New Patriotic Party
20	Alan Kyeremanteng	2003	2007	Kufuor government	New Patriotic Party
21	Joe Baidoe-Ansah	2007	2008	Kufuor government	New Patriotic Party
22	Papa Owusu-Ankomah (MP)	2008	2009	Kufuor government	New Patriotic Party
23	Hanna Tetteh	2009	2012	Mills government	National Democratic Congress
23	Hanna Tetteh	2012	2013	Mahama government	National Democratic Congress
24	Haruna Iddrisu (MP)	14 February 2013	16 July 2014	Mahama government	National Democratic Congress
25	Ekwow Spio-Garbrah	16 July 2014	6 January 2017	Mahama government	National Democratic Congress
26	Alan John Kyerematen	28 January 2017	16 January 2023	Akufo-Addo government	New Patriotic Party
27	K. T. Hammond (MP)	24 March 2023	6 January 2025	Akufo-Addo government	New Patriotic Party
28	Elizabeth Ofosu-Adjare (MP)	25 January 2025	Incumbent	Mahama government 2	National Democratic Congress

== Laws Passed ==
- Copyright Act,2005 (Act 690). This Act protects the intellectual properly rights of creators in Ghana. The Act grants authors exclusive economic and moral rights over their original works, provides for the duration of copyright protection, outlines permitted uses of copyrighted works and prescribes penalties for copyright infringement.
- Ghana Investment Promotion Center Act, 2013 (Act 865) establishes the Ghana Investment Promotion Centre (GIPC) to promote and facilitate domestic and foreign investment, sets investment guarantees, foreign participation requirements and reserved sectors.
- Ghana International Trade Commission Act, 2016 (Act 926) investigate dumping, subsidized imports and safeguard domestic industries through WTO complaint trade remedies.
- Ghana Free Zones Act,1995 (Act 504) establishes the Ghana Free Zones Authority to promote processing and manufacturing for export through targeted tax and customs concessions.
- Registration of Business Names Act, 1962 (Act 151) regulates sole proprietorships, partnership names and commercial identity registration in Ghana.
- Ghana Standards Authority Act, 2022 (Act 1078) supersedes legacy regulatory metrics to embed total fairness in trade transactions. The Act deploys dedicated trading monitor fuel pumps, weigh scales, electric meters and medical equipment for accurate calibration.
- Incorporated Private Partnerships Act, 1962 (Act 152) an Act establishes to govern the official registration, incorporated and legal frameworks regulating business partnerships in Ghana

== Initiatives Undertaken ==
- Industrial Revitalization Programme. The Initiative provides targeted stimulus packages and technical assistance to financially distressed but economically viable domestic companies to help restore their operational capacity and protect local jobs.
- _{The One District One Factory (1D1F) initiative is designed to decentralize industrial development across Ghana by facilitating the establishment of at least one medium to large scale processing enterprise in every district, focusing heavily on adding value to local agriculture raw materials.}
- _{The Development of Strategic Anchor Industries aims to diversify the national economy beyond primary commodities like cocoa and gold by establishing brand new manufacturing sectors, such as automotive assembly, pharmaceuticals, petrochemicals and textiles.}
- _{The Establishment of Industrial Parks in all regions focuses on creating multi-purpose Special Economic Zones (SEZs) equipped with land, utilities and infrastructure to enhance private sector industrialization.}
- The Development of small and medium scale enterprises (SMEs) aims to drive job creation across all sectors of the economy by providing targeted support, capacity building and financial access to local small businesses.
- The Export Development Programmed encourages and assists local businesses to capitalize on preferential trade frameworks such as the African Growth and Opportunity Act (AGOA) and Economic Partnership Agreements (EPA) ensuring companies can meet export quotas and access international markets.
- The Improving the Business Environment through regulatory reforms initiative focuses on reducing the cost and complexity of doing business in Ghana by streamlining administrative processes and cleaning up inefficient trade regulations through digital platforms like the Business Regulatory Reforms Portal.
- The Industrial sub-contracting exchange initiative is designed to connect local Small and Medium-Scale Enterprises (SMEs) with major domestic and multinational corporations, enabling larger firms to outsource business and supply chain requirements directly to local producers.
- The Improving Public Private sector Dialogue initiative strengthens institutional collaboration between government policymakers and industry stakeholders by hosting structured forums, including annual Business Summits to review economic progress and co-create trade policies

== Achievements ==
Under the One District, One Factory(1D1F) flagship programmed, 125 factories became fully operational by late 2022 out of nearly 300 projects initiated, creating over 160,000 direct and indirect jobs across various districts.

The Ministry enhanced Ghana's participation in African Continental Free Trade Area (AFCFTA). Supporting 19 Ghanaian companies covering about 90 products lines to obtain AFCFTA rules of origin certification. Launching export readiness training for over 200 women and youth-led enterprises to improve their access to regional markets.

The Ministry strengthened Ghana's export sector by promoting non-traditional exports, improving exporters readiness and facilitating access to regional and international markets through trade promotion initiatives.

The Ministry promoted strategic industries to diversify Ghana's economy, attract investment, increase industrial production and improve value addition in key sectors.

Through various programs, the Ministry strengthened Micro, Small and Medium Enterprises (MSMEs) by improving access to business development services, entrepreneurship training, finance and markets to enhance their competitiveness.

- Ministers of the Ghanaian Government
- ^a – Role was merged with the Ministry of Finance in October 1961
