= Lawrence Rosario Abavana =

Ghanaian politician and teacher

Lawrence Abavana

Member of the Ghana Parliament for Navrongo
- In office 1965–1966
- Preceded by: New
- Succeeded by: Joseph Evarisi Seyire

Member of the Ghana Parliament for Kassena-Nankana South
- In office 1951–1965
- Preceded by: New
- Succeeded by: Constituency abolished

Minister for Mines and Mineral Resources
- In office February 1965 – June 1965
- President: Dr. Kwame Nkrumah

Minister for Interior
- In office May 1964 – February 1965
- President: Dr. Kwame Nkrumah
- Preceded by: Kwaku Boateng
- In office June 1965 – February 1966
- President: Dr. Kwame Nkrumah
- Succeeded by: John Willie Kofi Harlley

Minister for Information and Broadcasting
- In office September 1962 – October 1963
- President: Dr. Kwame Nkrumah

Minister for Trade
- In office May 1961 – August 1961
- President: Dr. Kwame Nkrumah
- Preceded by: Ferdinand Koblavi Dra Goka
- Succeeded by: Ferdinand Koblavi Dra Goka (ministry was merged with the Ministry of Finance)

Minister for Health
- In office July 1960 – May 1961
- President: Dr. Kwame Nkrumah
- Succeeded by: Komla Agbeli Gbedemah
- In office October 1963 – January 1964
- President: Dr. Kwame Nkrumah

Commissioner of Northern Ghana
- In office 4 November 1957 – July 1960
- President: Dr. Kwame Nkrumah

Minister for Agriculture
- In office 1957 – 4 November 1957
- President: Dr. Kwame Nkrumah
- In office October 1961 – September 1962
- President: Dr. Kwame Nkrumah
- Preceded by: Kojo Botsio
- Succeeded by: Krobo Edusei

Personal details
- Born: Lawrence Rosario Abavana; 1920 Navrongo, Gold Coast
- Died: 29 May 2004 (aged 83–84)
- Citizenship: Ghanaian
- Education: Achimota College

Lawrence Rosario Abavana (1920 – 29 May 2004) was a Ghanaian politician and teacher by profession. He served in various ministerial portfolios in the first republic and also served as a member of the council of state in the third republic. He was a member of the Convention People's Party (CPP).

== Early life and education ==
Abavana was born in 1920 at Navrongo. He had his early education at the Roman Catholic School in Navrongo. He continued at Achimota College where he was trained as a teacher.

== Politics ==
=== Member of parliament ===
He was elected as a member of the legislative assembly in 1951 representing Kassena-Nankana South under the ticket of the Convention People's Party (CPP) that same year, he was appointed ministerial secretary to the minister of communication and works. In 1954, he defeated J. E. Seyire of the Northern People's Party by 5,795 to 3,344 to retain his seat as a member of the legislative assembly.

=== Ministerial secretary ===
In 1951, along with winning the Kassena-Nankana South seat under the ticket of the CPP, was appointed as ministerial secretary to the minister of communication and works. He became ministerial secretary to the minister of agriculture that same year of 1951.

=== Minister of State ===
In 1956, he was appointed minister without portfolio. A year later, he was given a portfolio – agriculture. As Minister for Agriculture, he led the Ghana delegation to a cocoa conference in September 1957. On 4 November 1957, he was appointed regional commissioner for Northern Ghana (this included the Northern Region the Upper East Region and the Upper West Region), and, in July 1960, he was appointed Minister for Health.

In May 1961, he was appointed Minister for Trade; as the Minister for Trade he led the Ghana delegation to Dahomey in August 1961. He was appointed Minister of Agriculture for the second time in October that same year, and in September 1962, he was appointed Minister for Information and Broadcasting. As information minister, he led the Ghana delegation to the Conference of Information Ministers from Commonwealth African Countries, London in July 1963. He served as Minister for Health for a second occasion from October 1963 to January 1964. As Minister for Health, he led the Ghana delegation to the Health, Sanitation, and Nutrition Conference held in Alexandria, United Arab Republic (UAR) in January 1964. He led another delegation in March 1964 to the World Health Assembly, Geneva.

In May 1964, he was appointed Minister for Interior, and in February 1965, Minister for Mines and Mineral Resources. On 11 June 1965, he was reappointed as Minister for Interior. He served in that capacity until the Nkrumah government was overthrown in 1966.

=== Member of council of State ===
He was appointed a member of Council of state in the third republic by Hilla Limann which lasted from 1979 to 1981, until Hilla Limann was deposed in a coup by Jerry John Rawlings on 31 December 1981.

== Personal life ==
Abavana was a Roman Catholic and he served as the president of the Retired Catholic Workers Association from 1992 until his death.

== Death ==
Abavana died at the age of 84 on 29 May 2004. He was given a state burial in his hometown in Navrongo, Upper East Region on 3 July 2004.

== Memorials and legacy ==
Streets, roads, crescents and junctions have been named in honour of him, most popular amongst them are ones within the Accra Metropolitan specifically in Kotobabi and Maamobi. There are schools within Accra and Northern which have structures named in honour of him, most notable amongst them is the Abavana Cluster of Schools, a basic school in Kotobabi within the Accra Metropolitan area.

== See also ==
- Nkrumah government
- Minister for Food and Agriculture (Ghana)
- Minister for Health (Ghana)
- Minister for Trade and Industry (Ghana)
- Minister for the Interior (Ghana)
- List of MLAs elected in the 1954 Gold Coast legislative election
- List of MLAs elected in the 1956 Gold Coast legislative election
- List of MPs elected in the 1965 Ghanaian parliamentary election
