= Nathaniel Azarco Welbeck =

Ghanaian politician and diplomat (1915–1972)

Member of the Ghana Parliament for Awutu-Senya
- In office 1965–1966

Resident Minister to Guinea
- In office 1958–1959
- Prime Minister: Kwame Nkrumah
- Preceded by: New position
- Succeeded by: Ebenezer Ako-Adjei

Member of the Ghana Parliament for Cape Coast
- In office 1954–1965
- Preceded by: Amponsah Dadzie
- Succeeded by: Kojo Abraham

Minister for Works and Housing
- In office 1954–1958
- President: Kwame Nkrumah

Personal details
- Born: 25 September 1915 Cape Coast, Gold Coast
- Died: February 25, 1972 (aged 56)
- Citizenship: Ghanaian
- Education: Wesley College

Nathaniel Azarco Welbeck (1915–1972) was a Ghanaian politician and a diplomat. He was a member of the Convention People's Party and minister of state in the first republic. He was briefly resident minister of Ghana in Guinea and also resident minister of Ghana in the Republic of the Congo (Léopoldville).

== Early life and education ==
Welbeck was born at Cape Coast on 25 September 1915 to Madam Adwoa Twi and Nomo Welbeck who migrated to Abidjan, Côte d'Ivoire. His father was of Ewe and Ga descent and his mother was Fanti, Welbeck identified as a Fanti, a Ga and also an Ewe however, due to Akan (of which Fantis constitute) customs and tradition which places more emphasis on one's maternal background, Welbeck was a Fanti from Cape Coast. His father died in a house fire at Abidjan where the family resided. Welbeck was sleeping in the same room with his father. His grandmother first saw the fire and blew the alarm. His father on hearing the alarm, picked him up and took him to a safe place. He then went back to the flaming house to rescue another child by throwing it out of the window into safety but he was overcome by the flames and could not find the door to get out of the burning house. Welbeck was too young to know his father. His mother was a bead trader. She decided to stay after her husband's death, she had established herself as a successful bead trader in Abidjan. Welbeck had his early education at a school in Abidjan. The French language being the medium of communication in schools in the area, Welbeck became well versed in the French language. Welbeck's mother decided to send Welbeck to his native Gold Coast to stay with his paternal uncle; Mr. Joseph Mensah Attabrah. He lived with his family in Swedru where he continued schooling, this time in the English Language. He sat for his standard seven school leaving certificate in 1932 and entered Wesley College in 1933 to train as a teacher.

== Career and politics ==
He qualified as a teacher in 1936. He taught in many institutions, the last school he was posted to before he brought his teaching career to a close was Takoradi Methodist School. He entered politics before quitting the teaching profession. He had joined the newly formed United Gold Coast Convention (UGCC); a political party that had begun as a movement to usher the Gold Coast into political independence. In 1949 he was appointed the secretary to the Local Education Committee. That same year, he decided to quit teaching completely to focus on politics. Kwame Nkrumah left the UGCC to form the Convention People's Party(CPP) on 12 June 1949 and Welbeck joined the party that same day as one of its founding members. A year later, he was arrested during an unrest which followed Nkrumah's declaration of "Positive Action Without Violence." He was tried and charged with sedition leading to his 12-month incarceration. This propelled his political career as he was viewed as a hero after his release. In 1951 he was appointed the national propaganda secretary for the CPP. After the death of Kwesi Plange in 1953 he was selected by his party the CPP to stand elections in his home town Cape Coast as a municipal member of the legislative assembly. He contested for the Cape Coast seat with Amponsah Dadzie of the United Party. Welbeck won the election but the results were contested by his opponent; Amponsah Dadzie. The general elections for Cape Coast was rescheduled for 1954 and this time Welbeck was elected and he kept the seat without any court proceedings. That same year he was appointed minister for works. He was elected in office in 1956 and in 1958 he was appointed a resident minister to Guinea. In 1960 he was retained in parliament and appointed minister of state for Defence. That same year he was appointed Minister Plenipotentiary and Ambassador Extraordinary posted to Congo as resident minister representing Ghana. He was returned to Ghana in November 1960 after his residence was besieged by the Congo military for allegedly plotting with the then deposed Patrice Lumumba against Mobutu's regime. In September 1962, he became acting executive secretary of the CPP due to Hugh Horatio Coffie Crabbe's detention. He was appointed Executive Secretary of the party in 1963 while Nkrumah was the general secretary. In 1965 Welbeck was appointed Minister of information (a non cabinet post) and party propaganda secretary.

== Personal life ==
He was the great grandson of Philip Quaque of Cape Coast. He first married Ms. Sarah Andrews and they had a daughter together. The marriage lasted from 1942 to 1950. He married Ms. Esther Quarm in 1954. Welbeck's hobbies included lawn tennis and stamps collection.

== Death ==
Welbeck died in 1972 after a protracted illness.
