= Henry Sonnie Torgbor Provencal =

Ghanaian politician

Regional Commissioner for Greater Accra
- In office 1965 – February 1966
- President: Dr. Kwame Nkrumah
- Preceded by: Paul Tagoe
- Succeeded by: David Animle Hansen

Member of Parliament for Gamashie
- In office 1965 – February 1966
- President: Dr. Kwame Nkrumah

Member of Parliament for Accra Central
- In office August 1960 – 1965
- President: Kwame Nkrumah

Personal details
- Born: Henry Sonnie Torgbor Provencal; 24 December 1922 Gold Coast
- Died: September 14, 2007 (aged 84)
- Citizenship: Ghanaian

Henry Sonnie Torgbor Provencal (1922–2007) was a Ghanaian politician. He was a member of parliament and a minister of state during the first republic. He served as the member of parliament for the Accra Central constituency from 1960 to 1965 and the member of parliament for the Gamashie constituency from 1965 to 1966. He also served as the Regional Commissioner for Greater Accra from 1965 to 1966.

== Early life and career ==
Provencal was born on 24 December 1922. He left school in 1940 to join his uncle, a timber merchant, as his assistant. He worked with his uncle from then until 1946 when he joined his father's corn-mill business. He worked with his father for a period of about three years.

In 1950, Provencal was arrested with several others for his part in Positive Action, a campaign which demanded "self-government now" for the then British colony of the Gold Coast. He was detained for 13 months. Upon his release, he was unemployed and dependent on his father for his needs until the latter period of 1952. In 1953 he was employed as a transport officer for the then Cocoa Purchasing Company. That same year, he was elected member of the Accra Municipal Council. In 1955, Provencal joined his father as an assistant in a sand and stone business of which his father worked as a contractor for the supply.

== Politics ==
Provencal was appointed Personal Assistant to the then prime minister of Ghana Dr. Kwame Nkrumah in June or July 1957. He served in this capacity until 29 August 1960. Ghana had become a republic in 1960 and the then prime minister Dr. Kwame Nkrumah became the president of Ghana. As head of state, he could no longer serve as a member of parliament for his constituency, Accra Central. His seat became vacant and on 30 August 1960, a by-election was held to fill the seat. Provencal contested for the seat on the ticket of the Convention People's Party (CPP) and won polling 11,545 votes to beat Solomon Edmund Odamtten of the United Party (UP) who polled 165 votes. Provencal remained a member of parliament for the Accra Central constituency until 1965. In 1961, he doubled as a Deputy Minister for Interior and he remained in this position until July 1964. A month later, he was appointed Executive Secretary of the Accra Tema Council (now the Accra Metropolitan Assembly) and in 1965 he was elevated to ministerial status when he was appointed Regional Commissioner for Greater Accra. That same year, he became the member of parliament for the Gamashie constituency.

Provencal held these appointments until 24 February 1966 when the Nkrumah government was overthrown. Provencal was consequently arrested and incarcerated by the National Liberation Council (NLC) under "protective custody" at the Ussher Fort Prison for about two and half years.

During the Limann administration, Provencal together with Johnny Hansen founded the Kwame Nkrumah Revolutionary Guards (KNRG). The group had its roots in the People's Revolutionary Party (PRP) that was founded to contest the 1979 election but later merged with the People's National Party (PNP). He served as General Secretary of the KNRG.

== Death and legacy ==
Provencal died on 14 September 2007. In 1965 he founded the Accra City Guards, which has existed to this day.

== See also ==
- List of MLAs elected in the 1956 Gold Coast legislative election
- List of MPs elected in the 1965 Ghanaian parliamentary election
