= Boahene Yeboah-Afari =

Ghanaian educator and politician (1920 – 1996)

Brong Ahafo Regional Minister
- In office 1958–1959
- President: Dr. Kwame Nkrumah
- Preceded by: New
- Succeeded by: Stephen Willie Yeboah

Minister for Communication and Works
- In office June 1956 – 1957
- President: Dr. Kwame Nkrumah

Minister for Agriculture
- In office July, 1956 – September, 1956
- President: Kwame Nkrumah

Member of Parliament for Sunyani East
- In office 1951–1962

Personal details
- Born: Kwame Boahene Yeboah-Afari; 13 November 1920 Gold Coast
- Died: 22 May 1996 (aged 75)
- Citizenship: Ghanaian
- Education: Abuakwa State College

Kwame Boahene Yeboah-Afari (13 November 1920 – 22 May 1996) was an educator and a politician. He served in various ministerial portfolios of the first republic including serving as Ghana's first Minister for Agriculture and the first Regional Minister for the Brong Ahafo Region. He also served as a member of parliament for the Sunyani East constituency.

== Early life and education ==
Yeboah-Afari was born on 13 November 1920 to Nana Yeboah-Afari II, son of a royal of the Dormaa Stool. He had his secondary education at Abuakwa State College completing in 1947.

== Career ==
After his secondary education he returned to the Brong Ahafo Region to help revive the abandoned Dormaa Senior High School (then Dormaa State College) in Dormaa which was founded by one Mr. Oppong and one Mr. Yeboah who were both from Dormaa. He was made principal of the school by the founders when the first principal resigned upon threats from the British Colonial Government District Commissioner (DC) as the District Commissioner insisted the college's establishment was not part of the Government's development plan. Yeboah-Afari started the college again on 8 January 1948 with three students. He served as the school's principal, teacher, bursar and messenger.

He developed close ties with Kwame Nkrumah (who was then the organising secretary of the United Gold Coast Convention) after forming a Dormaa Ahenkro branch of the United Gold Coast Convention (UGCC) and served as a secretary of the branch. Dr. Kwame Nkrumah had founded the Ghana National College against the will of the then colonial government and when Nkrumah was in Kumasi, Yeboah-Afari met him to discuss the problems his school was facing with the colonial government and to suggest that Nkrumah takes responsibility for the school like he did for the Ghana National College.

== Politics ==
Yeboah-Afari was a member of the Brong Kyempem Federation (BKF), which later changed into Brong Kyempem Council (BKC); a group that was founded for the progress of the Bono State. He replaced Nana Agyemang Badu I; the then omanhene (paramount chief) of Dormaa who had left for the United Kingdom for further studies at the University of Oxford. In 1951, he was elected as the first member of the legislative assembly representing Sunyani East on the ticket of the Convention People's Party. Five years later he was appointed Ghana's first Minister for Agriculture, he was then the youngest (aged 35) Minister in the Nkrumah government.

In September 1956, he was appointed Minister for Communications and Works. During his tenure in office he helped establish the erstwhile Ghana Airways Corporation and the State Transport Corporation (STC). He was minister without portfolio in 1957. In June 1958, he was appointed Ministerial Secretary (deputy minister) for Western Ashanti, later that year when the Brong Ahafo Region was created he was appointed the Region's first Commissioner (Regional Minister).

As the regional commissioner for the Brong Ahafo Region, he helped found the Sunyani Secondary School. His administration also helped in determining a location for the Sunyani Airport and the Military Barracks. He served as Brong Ahafo's regional commissioner until 1959 when he was replaced by Stephen Willie Yeboah. On 29 June 1962, he was sentenced to a term exceeding 12 months imprisonment making him incapable of representing the Sunyani East electoral area in parliament.

== Personal life and death ==
He was the father of Ajoa Yeboah-Afari, a Ghanaian journalist.

Boahene Yeboah-Afari died on 22 May 1996, aged 75.
