= Eugene Bortei-Doku =

Ghanaian agriculturist and politician

Minister for Food and Agriculture
- In office Jan 1982 – Dec 1983
- President: Jerry Rawlings

Ambassador to Italy
- President: Jerry Rawlings

Personal details
- Died: March 2000 (aged 83 years)
- Resting place: Nungua
- Children: 9
- Education: Achimota School; University of Reading
- Profession: Agriculturist; Lecturer

Eugene Borketey Bortei-Doku was a Ghanaian agriculturist and politician. He was Secretary for Agriculture between 1982 and 1983.

== Early life and education ==
Bortei-Doku's secondary school education was at Achimota School between 1932 and 1936. He later obtained a Diploma at the Imperial College of Tropical Agriculture at the University of the West Indies in Trinidad and Tobago. He went on to obtain a postgraduate teachers' certificate at the University of Reading in the United Kingdom in 1956. He went on to the United States where he acquired a certificate in Extension Education in 1960 at the University of Vermont. He was back at University of Reading where he completed the Master of Science in Agricultural extension in 1969.

== Career ==
Bortei-Doku was involved in various agricultural programmes between 1957 and 1965. He was instrumental in significant development programmes at the Agricultural Colleges at Kwadaso, Ashanti Region and Nyankpala in the Northern Region. He became the Head of the Training and Manpower Division of the Ministry of Agriculture in Ghana. He was also important for the building of other agricultural institutions at Okwahu, Asuansi, Wenchi, Ejura, Navrongo and Adidome for the training of agricultural extension officers. He is also reported to have developed diploma courses in agriculture animal health, and agricultural mechanisation for the staff of the Ministry of Agriculture.

Bortei-Doku later joined the University of Ghana. He was instrumental in developing the Extension Division of the Department of Agricultural Economics and Farm management at the university into a fully-fledged department in 1976 and was the first head of the Department of Agricultural Extension. He retired from the university in 1978. He also contributed to the development of the Faculty of Agriculture.

== Politics and diplomacy ==
In January 1982, he was appointed Secretary for Agriculture by the Provisional National Defence Council (PNDC), a position he held until December 1983. Around 1985, he was the Ambassador to Italy with accreditation to Turkey and Malta.

== Honorary Doctorate ==
In 1991, the University of Ghana conferred an honorary Doctor of Science degree on him.

== Death ==
Bortei-Doku died in March 2000 at the age of 83 years.

== Family ==
Bortei-Doku had four sons and five daughters.

== Publications ==
- Bortei-Doku, E.; Barnes-McConnell, P. W. (October 1984). Malawi: Focus on a Bean Culture. East Lansing, Michigan: Michigan State University.
- Bortei-Doku, E. (1985). "In-service training of extension staff: A successful Ghanaian experience". 1984 Training for Agriculture and Rural Development. Rome: Food and Agriculture Organization of the United Nations: 87–94. ISBN 9789251021392. ISSN 0251-1495.
