= Gumo =

Coordinates: 9°30′N 0°54′W

Gumo is a community in Kumbungu District in the Northern Region of Ghana. It is located along the Tamale-Kumbungu trunk road.
