= Kwaku Boateng (politician) =

Ghanaian politician, former minister in Nkrumah government (c.1926–2006)

The Honourable Kwaku Boateng

Minister of Education and Social Welfare
- In office 1964–1966
- President: Kwame Nkrumah
- Preceded by: Alfred Jonas Dowuona-Hammond

Minister for Interior
- In office 1961–1964
- President: Kwame Nkrumah
- Preceded by: Ashford Emmanuel Inkumsah
- Succeeded by: Lawrence Rosario Abavana

Personal details
- Born: 1925/1926 Akyem Abuakwa, Gold Coast
- Died: 1 May 2006 (aged 80) Cape Town, South Africa
- Party: Convention People's Party
- Spouse: Mrs. Eleanor Boateng
- Children: Paul Boateng; Rosemary Boateng
- Education: King's College London
- Profession: Barrister, Evangelist

Kwaku Boateng (1925/1926 – 1 May 2006) was a Ghanaian politician and barrister who was a state minister in the First Republic.

== Early life and education ==
Kwaku Boateng was born to Opanin Acheampong and Madam Anima Acheampong of Old Tafo in Akyem Abuakwa, Gold Coast. He started schooling at the Old Tafo Primary School and continued at the Begoro Senior School for his middle-school education. He entered Mfantsipim School, Cape Coast, in 1941 and was there until 1944, when he transferred to the Presbyterian Secondary School at Odumase Krobo and there received his Cambridge School Certificate. Boateng proceeded to Fourah Bay College, Freetown, Sierra Leone, in 1948 but left in 1949 and enrolled at King's College London University. He graduated in 1954, obtaining his Bachelor of Laws degree, and he was called to the English Bar at Gray's Inn in 1955. He was called to the Ghana Bar later that year and subsequently entered La Chambers as a junior practitioner.

Boateng began his own law practice in 1956 and remained in private practice until December that year, when he was elected Member of Parliament for the Tafo constituency.

== Politics ==
Kwaku Boateng was a member of the Convention People's Party and served in various capacities in the Nkrumah government. He was Information Minister and, in 1961, became Interior Minister. He was Education Minister under Kwame Nkrumah from May 1964.

== Exile ==
After the 24 February 1966 coup d'état by the National Liberation Council, Boateng along with other members of the government went into exile. He went to the United Kingdom with his family.

== Other activities ==
While Minister of Education, Boateng opened the Bible House, headquarters of the Bible Society of Ghana on behalf of Kwame Nkrumah in 1965. He was a trustee of the Bible Society until his death. Towards the end of his political career, Boateng became an evangelist.

== Family ==
Paul Boateng, a British Labour politician, who was the Member of Parliament for Brent South from 1987 to 2005, is his son. Kwaku Boateng's wife was Mrs Eleanor Boateng, who was Scottish. His brothers are Andrew Boateng, of New York, and Francis Boateng, Lieutenant of the Los Angeles Police Department (in the Commercial Crimes Division). In the early 1950s, Kwaku Boateng had an affair with a young woman, bearing him a son, Isaac Boateng. Kwaku Boateng and J. B. Danquah were related by marriage.

== Death ==
Kwaku Boateng died on 1 May 2006, aged 80, at his son Paul's home in Cape Town, South Africa, during Paul's stint as High Commissioner to South Africa.

== See also ==
- Nkrumah government
- Convention People's Party

Parliament of Ghana
Preceded by	1960 – ?	Succeeded by ?
Political offices
Preceded by	Ministry for Information ? – ?	Succeeded by
Preceded by Ashford Emmanuel Inkumsah	Minister for the Interior; 1961 – 1964	Succeeded by Lawrence Rosario Abavana
Preceded by ?	Minister for Education; 1964 – ?	Succeeded by ?
