= John Bogolo Erzuah =

Ghanaian diplomat (1914-c. 1979)

Ghana Ambassador to Ivory Coast
- In office 1964–1966
- President: Kwame Nkrumah
- Preceded by: J. K. A. Quarshie

Ghana Ambassador to France
- In office 1962–1964
- President: Kwame Nkrumah
- Preceded by: Kwame Sanaa-Poku Jantuah
- Succeeded by: J. E. Bossman

Ghana High Commissioner to Egypt
- In office 1959–1960
- President: Kwame Nkrumah
- Succeeded by: Cobina Kessie

Ghana High Commissioner to India
- In office 1957–1959
- President: Kwame Nkrumah
- Succeeded by: Nana Kwabena Kena II

Personal details
- Born: John Bogolo Erzuah; 1914 Takinta, Gold Coast
- Died: c. 1979
- Education: St. Augustine's College
- Occupation: Diplomat

John Bogolo Erzuah (1914–c. 1979) was a Ghanaian diplomat, politician and teacher. He served as a minister of state in 1956, and also represented Ghana in various foreign missions from 1957 to 1966.

== Early life and education ==
Erzuah was born in 1914 at Takinta a town in the Western Region of Ghana. He was trained as a teacher at St. Augustine's College, Cape Coast and passed his intermediate bachelors.

== Career ==
Erzuah joined the St. Augustine's College staff after training as a teacher, and he became headmaster of Ghana College, Esiama, Western region.

In 1951, he was elected as a member of the Legislative Assembly for Ankobra. That same year he was appointed ministerial secretary to the ministry of education. He was chairman of the Erzuah committee that was established to review the salaries and service conditions of non government teachers. In 1952, he was a member of the Ghana delegates in the African Education Conference held at Cambridge. He was re-elected as a member of the legislative assembly in 1956 and that same year he was promoted to Minister of Education. In July 1956, he became a minister without portfolio for the Ministry of External Affairs.

Erzuah was appointed Ghana's high commissioner to India in 1957. He served in this capacity for two years. In 1959 he was made Ghana's high commissioner to Egypt. He served in this capacity until 1960. In 1962 he served as Ghana's ambassador to France and in 1964 he became Ghana's ambassador to the Ivory Coast until 1966 when the Nkrumah government was overthrown by the NLC.

== Personal life ==
In 1979, it was noted that Erzuah had recently died.

== See also ==
- Nkrumah government
- Minister for Education (Ghana)
