= Armed Forces Revolutionary Council (Ghana) =

Government

Overview
- Established: 4 June 1979
- Dissolved: 24 September 1979
- State: Ghana
- Leader: Chairman (Jerry Rawlings)
- Headquarters: Accra

The Armed Forces Revolutionary Council (AFRC) was the military junta that seized power in Ghana from June 4, 1979, to September 24, 1979.

== 4 June military coup ==
The AFRC came to power in a coup that removed the Supreme Military Council, another military regime, from power. The June 4 coup was preceded by an abortive attempt on May 15, 1979, when Flt. Lt. Jerry Rawlings and other ranks were arrested. Their trial only served to make them popular among the junior ranks of the armed forces and the general public. As a result of this, Peter Tasiri Azongo, a Lance Corporal in the Armed Forces organised some colleagues who attacked the facilities where Rawlings was being held and released him in the early hours of June 4.

During the fighting that ensued throughout the day, a number of military personnel died. These include Major General Odartey-Wellington, who led the government's resistance to the coup d'état, and Colonel Joseph Enningful, who was a former Commander of the Support Services of the Ghana Armed Forces. Other soldiers who died that day include Second-Lieutenant J. Agyemang Bio, Corporal William Tingan, Lance Corporal Sorkpor, Trooper Samuel Larsey, Trooper Emmanuel Koranteng-Apau, Lance Corporal Gilbert Kwabla Folivi-Tayko and Lance Corporal Mamudu Kalifa. They were all buried with full military honours at the Osu Military Cemetery in Accra.

== House cleaning exercise ==
The regime started a 'house cleaning' exercise against corruption. Three former military leaders of Ghana, Lt. Gen. Afrifa, Gen. Acheampong and Lt. Gen. Akuffo, were executed, together with five other senior officers deemed to have been corrupt by the special courts set up by the government. Numerous business entrepreneurs were also targeted and unlawfully had their assets confiscated by the AFRC government, including J. K. Siaw.

The AFRC allowed the already scheduled elections to go ahead and handed over to the duly elected Dr. Hilla Limann of the People's National Party, who became the only president of the Third Republic of Ghana.

== Membership ==
The AFRC consisted of 15 members.

=== AFRC members ===
Position	Name	Dates	Notes
Head of state of Ghana and chairman	Flight Lieutenant Jerry John Rawlings	Jun 1979 – 24 Sep 1979	
Official spokesman	Captain Kojo Boakye-Djan	Jun 1979 – 24 Sep 1979	
Member	Major Mensah-Poku	Jun 1979 – 24 Sep 1979	
Member	Major Mensah Gbedemah	Jun 1979 – 24 Sep 1979	
Member	Lieutenant Commander H. C. Apaloo	Jun 1979 – ?	Died following traffic accident
Member	Captain Kwabena Baah Achamfuor	19 Jun 1979 – 24 Sep 1979	
Member	Warrant Officer (II) Harry K. Obeng	Jun 1979 – 24 Sep 1979	
Member	Staff Sergeant Alex Adjei	Jun 1979 – 24 Sep 1979	
Member	Corporal Owusu Boateng	Jun 1979 – 24 Sep 1979	
Member	Leading Aircraftman John N. Gatsiko	Jun 1979 – 24 Sep 1979	
Member	Lance Corporal Peter Tasiri	Jun 1979 – 24 Sep 1979	
Member	Lance Corporal Ansah Atiemo	Jun 1979 – 24 Sep 1979	
Member	Lance Corporal Sarkodee-Addo	Jun 1979 – 24 Sep 1979	
Member	Corporal Sheikh Tetteh	Jun 1979 – 24 Sep 1979	
Member	Private Owusu Adu	Jun 1979 – 24 Sep 1979	

- Captain Henry Smith – one of the architects of the uprising and described by officers and soldiers in June 1979 as the officer who was responsible for the success of the uprising – declined membership to the AFRC. He was, nevertheless, given the portfolio of "special duties" and was also put in charge of the Foreign Affairs ministry.
- Lieutenant Commander H. C. Apaloo died in a road traffic accident before the end of AFRC rule.

== Commissioners ==
Commissioners were in place of Ministers of state and most carried on from the previous government. A number of commissioners had to cover additional ministries during the period of the AFRC.

=== List of commissioners (ministers) of state ===
Portfolio	Commissioner	Time frame	Notes
Commissioner for Foreign Affairs	Gloria Amon Nikoi	1979	
Attorney General and Commissioner for Justice	A. N. E. Amissah	26 June 1979– ?	
Commissioner for Finance and Economic Planning	Dr. J. L. S. Abbey	1979	
Commissioner for Trade and Tourism	Dr. J. L. S. Abbey	1979	
Commissioner for Interior and Inspector General of Police	C. O. Lamptey	1979 – 26 June 1979	
Commissioner for Interior and Inspector General of Police	Ben Forjoe	26 June 1979 – ?	
Commissioner for Lands, Natural Resources	George Benneh	1979	
Commissioner for Fuel and Power	George Benneh	1979	
Commissioner for Industries	Anthony Woode	1979	
Commissioner for Labour and Social Welfare	Anthony Woode	1979	
Commissioner for Transport and Communications	George Harlley	1979	
Commissioner for Works and Housing	George Harlley	1979	
Commissioner for Agriculture	Abeifaa Karbo	June 1979 – September 1979	
Commissioner for Information	Kwame Afreh	1979	
Commissioner for Cocoa Affairs	Kwame Afreh	1979	
Commissioner for Consumer Affairs and Cooperatives	Nii Anyetei Kwakwranyra	1979 – 26 June 1979	
Commissioner for Consumer Affairs and Cooperatives	Kofi Badu	26 June 1979 –?	
Commissioner for Local Government & Commissioner for Sports	Kofi Badu	1979 – 26 June 1979	
Commissioner for Local Government & Commissioner for Sports	Nii Anyetei Kwakwranyra	26 June 1979 – ?	
Commissioner for Education and Culture	Emmanuel Evans-Anfom	1979	
Commissioner for Health	Emmanuel Evans-Anfom	1979	
Regional commissioners
Ashanti Regional Commissioner	Colonel R. K. Zumah	1979	
Brong Ahafo Region	Lieutenant Commander I. K. Awuku	1979	
Central Region	Kobena Gyapea Erbynn	1979	
Eastern Region	S. H. Annancy	1979	
Greater Accra Regional Commissioner	E. R. K. Dwemoh	1979	
Northern Region	Lieutenant Colonel L. K. Kodjiku	1979	
Upper Region	Major M. Gyabaah	1979	
Volta Regional Commissioner	Lieutenant Colonel G.K. Amevor	1979	
Western Region	J. S. Amenlema	1979	

== See also ==
- History of Ghana (1966–79)

Preceded by Supreme Military Council (1975–1978)	Government of Ghana (Military Regime); Jun 1979 – Sept 1979	Succeeded by Limann government (1979–1981)
