= Kojo Botsio =

Ghanaian politician (1916–2001)

Hon. Kojo Botsio
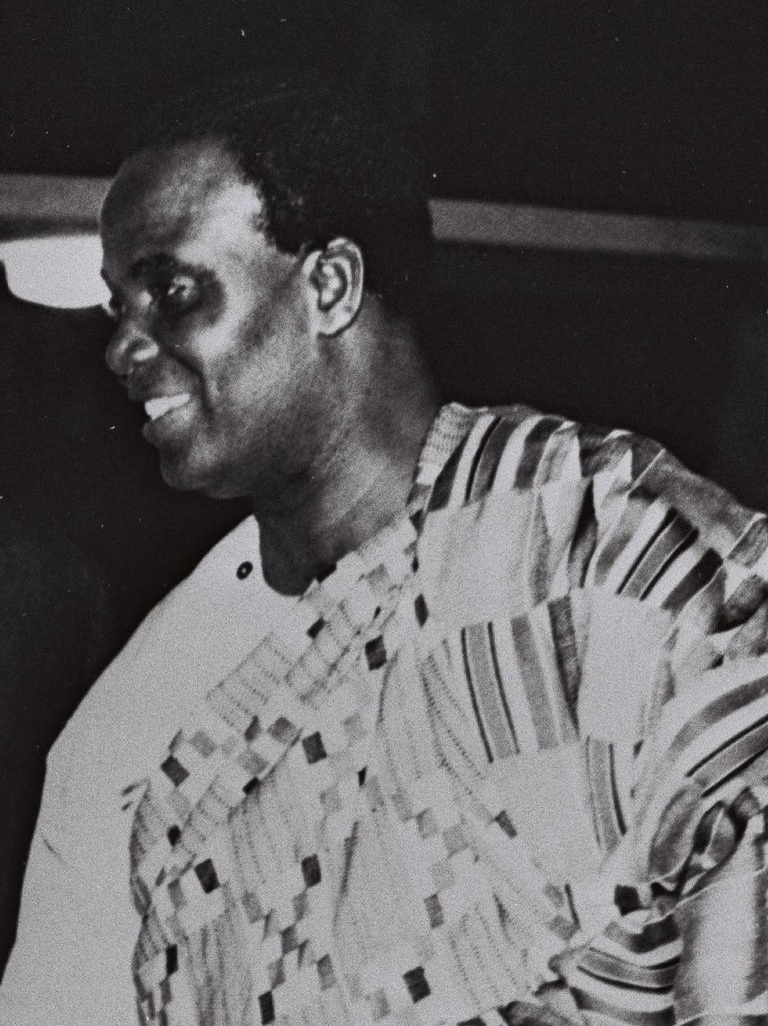

5th Minister for Foreign Affairs (Ghana)
- In office 1963–65
- President: Kwame Nkrumah
- Preceded by: Kwame Nkrumah
- Succeeded by: Alex Quaison-Sackey

2nd Minister for External Affairs
- In office 1958–59
- Prime Minister: Kwame Nkrumah
- Preceded by: Kwame Nkrumah
- Succeeded by: Ebenezer Ako-Adjei

Personal details
- Born: 21 February 1916
- Died: 6 February 2001 (aged 84) Accra, Ghana
- Party: Convention People's Party
- Spouse: Ruth Botsio (née Whittaker)
- Children: Kojo, Merene
- Education: Fourah Bay College; Brasenose College, Oxford University
- Profession: Educationist

Kojo Botsio (21 February 1916 – 6 February 2001) was a Ghanaian diplomat and politician. He studied in Britain, where he became the treasurer of the West African National Secretariat and an acting warden for the West African Students' Union. He served as his country's first Minister of Education and Social Welfare from 1951, as Minister for Foreign Affairs twice in the government of Kwame Nkrumah, and was a leading figure in the ruling Convention People's Party (CPP).

== Early life and education ==
Kojo Botsio attended Adisadel College, Cape Coast and then the Achimota College in Accra. He proceeded to Sierra Leone, where he obtained his first degree from the Fourah Bay University College, the only university in West Africa at the time. He then went to the United Kingdom in 1945 and attended Brasenose College, Oxford University, where he was awarded a postgraduate degree in Geography and Education.

== Career ==
Botsio was a teacher at the St. Augustine's College and the London City Council Secondary School in the United Kingdom. He was also once Vice-Principal of Abuakwa State College at Kibi in Ghana. Some of his students have been Kofi Baako and P. K. K. Quaidoo who were both ministers in Nkrumah's government.

== Politics ==
Botsio first met Nkrumah in 1945 while in London, who he would eventually help form the Convention People's Party. In 1945 he attended the Fifth Pan-African Congress in Manchester organised by Nkrumah along with Peter Abrahams, which was attended by names such as W. E. B. Du Bois, Amy Ashwood Garvey and Raphael Armattoe to name just a few.

He first entered the Legislative Assembly of Ghana when he won the Winneba seat at the 1951 Gold Coast legislative election and served under Kwame Nkrumah who was the leader of government business. He continued to be in the legislative assembly until 1957, when he became a Member of parliament (MP). He remained an MP until 1966 when the Parliament of Ghana was suspended by the National Liberation Council which had overthrown the CPP government of Kwame Nkrumah. He was with Nkrumah when he died in 1972. He initially served as the Minister for Trade and Industry in the CPP government. He was also at various times, minister for Foreign Affairs, Social Welfare, Transport and Communications, Agriculture, Trade and Development.

== Family ==
Kojo Botsio was married to Ruth Whittaker. They had two children, Kojo and Merene, both barristers.

Parliament of Ghana
New title	Winneba; 1951 – ?	Succeeded by ?
Political offices
Preceded by ?	Minister of Education (Gold Coast); 1951 – 1957?	Succeeded by ?
Preceded by ?	Minister of Trade and Labour; 1957–1958	Succeeded by ?
Preceded by Dr. Kwame Nkrumah	Foreign Minister; 1958–1959	Succeeded by Ebenezer Ako-Adjei
Preceded by Francis Yao Asare	Minister of Agriculture; 1960–1962	Succeeded by Lawrence Rosario Abavana
Preceded by Kwame Nkrumah	Foreign Minister; 1963–1965	Succeeded by Alex Quaison-Sackey
