= List of MLAs elected in the 1954 Gold Coast general election =

Colonial Era
1951 Assembly	(election)
1954 Assembly	(election)
1956 Assembly	(election)
First Republic
1957 Parliament	(election)
1965 Parliament	(election)
Second Republic
1969 Parliament	(election)
Third Republic
1979 Parliament	(election)
Fourth Republic
1st Parliament	(1992)
2nd Parliament	(1996)
3rd Parliament	(2000)
4th Parliament	(2004)
5th Parliament	(2008)
6th Parliament	(2012)
7th Parliament	(2016)
8th Parliament	(2020)
9th Parliament	(2024)

This is a list of people elected to the Legislative Assembly of the Gold Coast on 15 June 1954. Unlike the previous Legislative Assembly, all members were elected directly by the general population. The membership was also increased to 104.

== Composition ==
Affiliation	Members
Convention People's Party CPP	71
Northern People's Party (NPP)	12
Togoland Congress (TC)	2
Ghana Congress Party (GCP)	1
Muslim Association Party (MAP)	1
Anlo Youth Association (AYA)	1
Independents	16
Total	104
Government Majority	

== List of MPs elected in the general election ==
The following table is a list of MPs elected in the Gold Coast 1954 election. Some notable politicians lost their seats in this election. These include four members of The Big Six. The first was Emmanuel Obetsebi-Lamptey who lost out to Kwame Nkrumah in Accra Central. The next was J. B. Danquah, a founding member of the United Gold Coast Convention and now a member of the Ghana Congress Party who lost to a relative, Aaron Ofori-Atta. A third member of the Big Six, William Ofori Atta of the GCP failed to keep his Akim Abuakwa West seat. The fourth was Edward Akufo-Addo who lost the Akwapim South election. The former wife of J. B. Danquah, Mabel Dove Danquah (divorced in 1941) became the first female in the country to be elected when she won the Ga (rural) seat, beating Nii Amaa Ollennu. Kweku Bankole Awooner-Renner, leader of the Muslim Association Party failed to win the Accra West seat.

Two MPs were elected unopposed. They were F. E. Tachie-Menson (Denkyira) and W. M. N. Dzietror (South Tongu). Nkrumah had the single highest vote in the election, 13,938.

=== Ashanti Protectorate ===
Constituency	Elected MP	Elected Party	Comment	Previous MP	Previous Party
Adansi Banka	John Young Ghann	CPP		N. B. Abubekr	
Agona Kwabre	J. E. Jantuah	CPP		John Jantuah (Kumasi North)	CPP
Ahafo	A. K. Senchirey	CPP			
Amansie East	A. R. Boakye	CPP		Abraham Boakye (Amansie)	CPP
Amansie West	K. A. Amankwa	CPP			
Ashanti-Akim	Charles de Graft Dickson	CPP			
Atebubu	J. S. Yeboah	CPP			
Atwima-Amansie	I. J. Adomako-Mensah	CPP			
Atwima-Nwabiagya	J. Baidoo	CPP			
Berekum	J. G. Awuah	CPP		John Awuah (Sunyani North West)	CPP
Juaben-Edweso	C. E. Osei	CPP			
Kumasi North	Archie Casely-Hayford	CPP	6,133 votes	Archie Casely-Hayford (Kumasi); Joseph Dontoh (Kumasi North)	CPP CPP
Kumasi South	Edward Asafu-Adjaye	CPP	11,232 votes	Joseph Dontoh	CPP
Obuasi	R. O. Amoako-Atta	CPP			
Offinso Kwabre	C. C. K. Addei	CPP			
Sekyere East	Krobo Edusei	CPP		Krobo Edusei (Kumasi North West)	CPP
Sekyere West	O. Bonsu	CPP			
Sunyani East	Boahene Yeboah-Afari	CPP			
Sunyani West	Stephen Willie Yeboah	CPP		Boahene Yeboah-Afari	CPP
Wenchi East	C. S. Takyi	CPP			
Wenchi West	Kofi Abrefa Busia (Leader of GCP)	GCP	3,754 votes formerly represented Asanteman Council		
=== Eastern Province ===
Constituency	Elected MP	Elected Party	Comment	Previous MP	Previous Party
Accra Central (Ashiedu Keteke)	Kwame Nkrumah	Convention People's Party (CPP)	13,938 votes	Kwame Nkrumah	CPP
Accra East	Ebenezer Ako-Adjei	CPP	11,660 votes		
Accra West	Thomas Hutton-Mills	CPP	11,084 votes	Thomas Hutton-Mills	CPP
Ada	Charles Ofoe Cudeto Amattey	CPP			
Akim Abuakwa Central	Aaron Ofori-Atta	CPP	4,958	J. B. Danquah now with (GCP)	United Gold Coast Convention
Akim Abuakwa East	K. Amoah-Awuah	CPP	1,207		
Akim Abuakwa North	C. E. Nimo	CPP			
Akim Abuakwa West	S. A. Owusu-Afari	CPP		William Ofori Atta now with (GCP)	United Gold Coast Convention
Akim Abuakwa South	Kwasi Sintim Aboagye	CPP			
Akwapim North	J. R. Asiedu	CPP			
Akwapim South	K. Asiam	CPP			
Dangbe-Shai	C. T. Nylander	CPP			
Ga Rural	Mabel Dove Danquah (First female MP)	CPP			
Kwahu North	Erasmus Isaac Preko	Independent			
Kwahu South	W. A. Wiafe	CPP			
Manya Krobo	A. M. Johnson	CPP			
Mid-Volta	J. Arjarquah	CPP			
New Juaben	S. G. Nimako	CPP		Ohene Djan (Akwapim New Juaben)	CPP
North Birim	A. E. Attafuah	CPP		Augustus Attafuah (Western Akim)	CPP
Osudoku	Alex Kwablah	Independent			
South Birim	D. K. A. Kwarteng	CPP			
Yilo Krobo	E. H. T. Korboe	CPP			
=== Northern Territories ===
Bawku	Adam Amandi	Independent	3,118 votes		
Bolga	R. B. Braimah	NPP	3,997 votes		
Bongo	W. A. Amoro	CPP	2,201 votes		
Builsa	A. Afoko	CPP	8,851 votes	A. Afoko	Northern Territories
Dagomba East	J. H. Allassani	CPP	2,766 votes	J. H. Allassani	Northern Territories
Dagomba North	S. I. Iddrisu	CPP	6,880 votes		
Dagomba South	Yakubu Tali (Tolon Naa)	NPP	3,838 votes	Yakubu Tali (Tolon Naa)	Northern Territories
Frafra East	T. K. Yentu	NPP	4,224 votes		
Gonja East, Yeji and Prang	J. A. Braimah	Independent	4,286 votes	J. A. Braimah	Northern Territories
Gonja West	E. A. Mahama	CPP	4,599 votes	E. A. Mahama	Northern Territories
Gulkpegu-Nanton	A. Osumanu	NPP	2,238 votes		
Jirapa-Lambussie	S. D. Dombo (leader of NPP)	NPP	4,227 votes		
Kassena-Nankanni North	C.K. Tedam (now Chairman of New Patriotic Party Council of Elders)	CPP	6,880 votes		
Kassena-Nankani South	Lawrence Rosario Abavana	CPP	5,795 votes	Lawrence Rosario Abavana	CPP
Kusasi Central	J. Awuni	NPP	6,349 votes	Jambaidu Awuni	Northern Territories
Kusasi East	I. Asigri	NPP	3,024 votes		
Kusasi West	A. Asumda	CPP	4,366 votes		
Lawra-Nandom	Abayifaa Karbo	NPP	2,764 votes		
Nanum-Dagbon	N. Atta	CPP	7,344 votes		
Savelugu	Sumani Bukhari	Independent	1,755 votes		
South Mamprusi East	Mumuni Bawumia	NPP	6,107 votes	Mumuni Bawumia	Northern Territories
South Mamprusi West	J. K. Yakubu	CPP	1,384 votes		
Talensi	A. T. Anaffu	Independent	2,047 votes		
Tumu	Imoru Egala	CPP	3,599 votes		
Wala North	Jatoe Kaleo	NPP	4,716 votes		
Wala South	Bukari K. Adama	NPP	4,931 votes		
=== Transvolta Togoland ===
Constituency	Elected MP	Elected Party	Comment	Previous MP	Previous Party
Akan Krachi	Joseph Kodzo	CPP		Joseph Kodzo (Buem Krachi)	CPP
Anlo East	C. H. Chapman	CPP			
Anlo North	N. K. Maglo	Independent			
Anlo South	Modesto Apaloo (Leader of Anlo Youth Association (AYA))	AYA			
Buem	F. Y. Asare	CPP			
Central Tongu	F. K. D. Goka	CPP			
Ho East	F. R. Ametowobla	Independent			
Ho West	Kodzo Ayeke	TC			
Keta	K. A. Gbedemah	CPP			
Kpandu North	S. G. Antor (Leader of Togoland Congress (TC))	TC	8,221 votes		
Kpandu South	G. R. Arhin	CPP			
South Tongu	W. M. N. Djietror	CPP	Elected unopposed		
Upper Tongu	Stephen Allen Dzirasa	CPP			
=== Western Province ===
Constituency	Elected MP	Elected Party	Comment	Previous MP	Previous Party
Abura Asebu	J. E. Hagan	CPP			
Agona	A. D. Appiah	Independent			
Agona Swedru	E. K. Bensah	CPP			
Ahanta-Shama	A. E. Inkumsah	CPP		Ashford. E. Inkumsah (Ahanta)	CPP
Ajumako-Asikuma	A. S. Abban	CPP			
Amenfi-Aowin	P. K. K. Quaidoo	CPP			
Assin Rural	Daniel Buadi	CPP			
Awutu	A. J. D. Hammond	CPP			
Bibiani	J. K. Essien	CPP			
Cape Coast	N. A. Welbeck	CPP	7,665 votes	Joseph Essilfie Hagan	CPP
Denkyira	F. E. Techie-Menson	CPP	Elected unopposed		
Eastern Gomoa	C. C. K. Baah	CPP			
Eastern Nzima-Axim	W. Baidoe-Ansah	CPP			
Ekumfi-Enyan	S. K. Otoo	CPP			
Elmina	K. O. Thompson	CPP			
Saltpond	Kofi Baako	CPP		William Arthur	CPP
Sefwi Wiawso	M. Y. Kumi	CPP		Anthony Woode	CPP
Sekondi-Takoradi	J. Arthur	CPP	11,143	J. K. Lamptey	CPP
Wassaw Central	Samuel Emanful Arkah	CPP			
Wassaw South	K. Ocran	Independent			
Western Nzima	J. B. Erzuah	CPP		John Bogolo Erzuah (Ankobra)	CPP
Winneba (Western Gomoa)	Kojo Botsio	CPP		Kojo Botsio	-

== See also ==
- Parliament of Ghana
- 1954 Gold Coast legislative election
