= Bamboi =

- Major town in Bole District
- Location of Bamboi in Northern region
- Coordinates: 8°10′N 2°2′W
- Country: Ghana
- Region: Northern Region
- District: Bole District

Population (2013)
  - Total: —
- Time zone: GMT
  - Summer (DST): GMT

Bamboi is a village in the Bole district, a district in the Savanna Region of north Ghana. Bamboi is connected by road to the town of Sawla.

== See also ==
- Yusif Sulemana
- Joseph Akati Saaka
- John Dramani Mahama
- Mahama Jeduah
- Emmanuel Adama Mahama
- Mole (Ghana parliament constituency)
