= C. K. Tedam =

Ghanaian politician (1925–2019)

Clement Kubindiwor Tedam (25 November 1925 – 25 April 2019) was a Ghanaian politician from the royal family of Paga in the Upper East Region of Ghana.

== Political career ==
C. K. Tedam entered the political scene through membership of the Gold Coast Legislative Assembly in 1954. He was later elected to parliament as an independent candidate that same year (1954). He then co-founded the Northern People's Party with Mumuni Bawumia, Alhassan Braimah (J. A. Braimah), Tolon Naa Alhaj Yakubu Tali, Adam Amandi, Lawra Naa Abeifaa Karbo II, Imoru Salifu, and Simon Diedong Dombo(Mohammed Abdul -saaka). He stood and won another election to parliament in 1956 on the ticket of the Northern People's till 1957. After 1957 when Kwame Nkrumah banned sectarian parties based on ethnicity, region etc. with a focus on nationally represented parties, the Northern People's joined forces with other sectarian focused parties to form the United Party (Ghana) until 1964 when Ghana became a one party state after a referendum. C. K. Tedam was thus compelled to become a Convention People's Party (CPP) Member of Parliament or lose his seat. Becoming a member of the CPP also served another purpose as it meant the CPP government will reverse the suspension of his brother as Chief of Paga which was being contested by the Chief's brother. He also served as a Minister of Local Government during the regime of the Supreme Military Council (Ghana). CK. Tedam won another election in 1969 to serve in the second republic but was disqualified after a court ruling resulting from a legal suit that was brought against him. The suit sort to say that as the government had banned all CPP Members from politics, it meant he could also not be an MP. The suit was upheld by the courts and therefore he had to leave parliament. A by election was held and he supported his Niece Catherine Tedam for the position which she subsequently won.

C. K. Tedam was a member of the Council of State during the regime of John Kufuor. He was a founding member of the New Patriotic Party. He became the Chairman of the Party's Council of elders during the time the NPP went in Opposition after 2008 and remained in that role till death.

== Personal life ==
He was the son and brother of two Pagapios (Traditional Ruler of the Paga Paramouncy) Tedam and Awampaga respectively. Before entering parliament, C. K. Tedam had been a teacher. He, however, came from a political party. His niece, Catherine Tedam won the by election and represented the Chiana Paga Constituency as an MP during the administration of Kofi Abrefa Busia. This was after C. K. Tedam was disqualified from being an MP because of his previous association with the CPP.

He was married to Winifred Tedam, daughter and sister respectively of Lawra Nas (Traditional Ruler of the Lawra Paramouncy); J.K. Karbo and Abeifa Karbo. C. K. Tedam had six children. He was a Catholic; a member of The Most Ancient and Noble Order of the Knights of St. John International, a religious and charity organisation in the Catholic Church worldwide and a Kasena by tribe.

== Death ==
C. K. Tedam died peacefully in the night of 25 April 2019 at the Korle Bu Teaching Hospital in Accra where he had been undergoing treatment. He was buried on Saturday the 22nd of June 2019, in Paga, his hometown in the Kassena Nankana West district in the Upper East Region.

== Awards ==
C. K. Tedam received awards for his services from the Pope John Paul, Paga Development Association and the New Patriotic Party.
