= List of MLAs elected in the 1951 Gold Coast general election =

Legislative Assembly of the Gold Coast

Colonial Era
1951 Assembly	(election)
1954 Assembly	(election)
1956 Assembly	(election)
First Republic
1957 Parliament	(election)
1965 Parliament	(election)
Second Republic
1969 Parliament	(election)
Third Republic
1979 Parliament	(election)
Fourth Republic
1st Parliament	(1992)
2nd Parliament	(1996)
3rd Parliament	(2000)
4th Parliament	(2004)
5th Parliament	(2008)
6th Parliament	(2012)
7th Parliament	(2016)
8th Parliament	(2020)
9th Parliament	(2024)

This is a list of members elected to the Legislative Assembly of the Gold Coast in 1951. There were 38 members elected directly by the general population and 37 others elected by territorial councils. In addition, three ex-officio members were appointed by the Governor of the Gold Coast and six others representing commercial interests. The CPP won all of the five seats from the urban areas and 29 of the 33 seats from the rural areas. It also had the support of enough of the members representing the territorial council to control a total of 56 out of the 84 seats in the assembly.

== Composition ==
Affiliation	Members
Convention People's Party CPP	34
United Gold Coast Convention (UGCC)	2
Independents	2
Territorial councils	37
Commercial interests	6
Governor appointees	3
Total	84
Government Majority	28

== List of MPs elected in the general election ==
The following table is a list of MPs elected on 8 February 1951 in the Gold Coast.

=== Ashanti Protectorate ===
Constituency	Elected MP	Elected Party	Comments
Adansi	Nuh Abubekr	CPP	
Amasie	Abraham Boakye	CPP	
Kumasi	Archie Casely-Hayford	CPP	
Kumasi East	Fori Dwumah	CPP	
Kumasi North	John Jantuah	CPP	
Kumasi South	Joseph Dontoh	CPP	
Kumasi West	Benjamin Kusi	CPP	
Kumasi North West	Krobo Edusei	CPP	
Mampong North	Yeboah Aukordieh	Independent	
Mampong South	Atta Mensah	CPP	
Sunyani North West	John Awuah	Independent	
Sunyani West	Boahene Yeboah-Afari	CPP	
Wenchi	Bediako Poku	Independent	
=== Eastern Province ===
Constituency	Elected MP	Elected Party	Comments
Accra Central (Ashiedu Keteke)	Kwame Nkrumah	Convention People's Party (CPP)	
Accra West	Thomas Hutton-Mills	CPP	
Akim Abuakwa Central	J. B. Danquah	United Gold Coast Convention (UGCC)	
Akim Abuakwa West	William Ofori Atta	UGCC	
Akwapim-New Juaben	Ohene Djan	CPP	
Ga-Adangbe	Issac Osabutey-Aguedze	CPP	
Kwahu	Richard Ampadu	CPP	
Western Akim	Augustus Attafua	CPP	
=== Northern Territories ===
Constituency	Elected MP	Elected Party	Comments
Kassena Nankani South	Lawrence Rosario Abavana	CPP	
=== Transvolta Togoland ===
Constituency	Elected MP	Elected Party	Comments
Anlo	Komla Agbeli Gbedemah	CPP	
Anlo	John Quarshie	CPP	
Akpini-Asogli (Trans-Volta Togoland)	Gerald Otoo Awuma	UGCC	
Buem - Krachi	Joseph Kodzo	CPP	
Volta River	Abraham Johnson	CPP	
=== Western Province ===
Constituency	Elected MP	Elected Party	Comments
Ahanta	Ashford Emmanuel Inkumsah	CPP	
Ankobra	John Bogolo Erzuah	CPP	
Assin - Upper Denkyira	Alfred Pobee Biney	CPP	
Cape Coast (municipal)	Kwesi Plange	CPP	
Cape Coast (rural)	Joseph Essilfie Hagan	CPP	
Saltpond	William Arthur	CPP	
Sefwi	Anthony Woode	CPP	
Sekondi-Takoradi	J. Kwesi Lamptey	CPP	
Tarkwa	Emmanuel Dadson	CPP	
Winneba	Kojo Botsio	CPP	
	Kobina Arku Korsah	CPP	
=== Elected by territorial councils - 37 seats ===
Constituency	Elected MP	Elected Party	Comments
Asanteman Council	Kofi Abrefa Busia	Asanteman Council	
Northern Territories	Yakubu Tali (Tolon Naa)		
Northern Territories	J. H. Allassani		
Northern Territories	Seidu Wala (Ketua Naa)		
Northern Territories	E. A. Mahama		
Northern Territories	J. A Braimah		
Northern Territories	Mumuni Bawumia		
Northern Territories	Imoru Ayarna		
Northern Territories	Akantigsi Afoko		
Northern Territories	Jambaidu Awuni		
=== Members with commercial interests - 6 seats ===
Constituency	Elected MP	Elected Party	Comments
=== Appointed by the Governor of the Gold Coast - 3 seats ===
Constituency	Elected MP	Elected Party	Comments

== See also ==
- Parliament of Ghana
- 1951 Gold Coast legislative election
