= Bagabaga College of Education =

College in Northern Region, Ghana

- Motto: Advance with the Sciences
- Established: January 31, 1944
- Affiliations: Government of Ghana
- Location: Tamale, Sagnarigu District, NS002, Ghana; 9.42393°N 0.86935°W
- Language: English
- Region Zone: Northern Region; Northern Zone
- Short name: Bace / Batco
- Source: An Atlas of The Forty Colleges of Education in Ghana

Bagabaga College of Education is a teacher education college in Tamale (Sagnarigu District, Northern Region, Ghana). The college is located in Northern Zone zone. It is one of the about 40 public colleges of education in Ghana. The college participated in the DFID-funded T-TEL programme. The college was set up in January 1944 with 17 males students with an objective to train professional teachers to teach in basic schools. The college is affiliated to the University of Education, Winneba.

== History ==
Bagabaga College of Education (BACE) was opened on 31 January 1944 with the motto ‘ADVANCE WITH THE SCIENCES’. Seventeen male students were enrolled as pioneer students with Mr. K. J. Dickens as the first principal. Messrs Abu Wemah and J. C. Annan were the other two pioneer members of the teaching staff.

The college has been called by the following names:

- Tamale Government Training College
- Government Training College
- Bagabaga Specialist Training College
- Bagabaga Training College (BATCO)
- Bagabaga College of Education (BACE)

Since 1944 the college has had nineteen principals. They are:
| Name | Years served |
|---|---|
| K. J. Dickens | 1944 – 1946 |
| Lt. Col. Wentworth | 1946 – 1951 |
| A. G. Page | 1951 – 1953 |
| D. M. Walsh | 1953 – 1956 |
| H. O. A. Mcwilliams | 1956 – 1963 |
| A. F. Menka | 1963 – 1964 |
| D. Gave | 1964 – 1965 |
| E. I. Benyarku | 1965 – 1968 |
| G. J. Agyeman | 1968 – 1969 |
| S. Aberdie Asante | 1969 – 1971 |
| A. Anaara | 1971 – 1972 |
| J. A. Braimah (Jnr) | 1972 – 1974 |
| J. N. Diakpieng | 1974 – 1987 |
| J. E. Bawa | 1987 – 1988 |
| J. A. Braimah (Jnr) | 1988 – 1989 |
| J. A. Ali | 1989 – 1991 |
| M. M. Mahama | 1991 – 1995 |
| S. M. Safo | 1995 – 1998 |
| S. Seini | 1998 – 2001 |
| A. Zakaria | 2001- |

== Programmes ==
Programmes the college has offered over the years:

- 1944- 2—year Certificate “B” teacher training course; shortly started the 2 year Certificate ‘A’ post “B” course.
- 1961 one-year Rural Agricultural Science course and later upgraded to a two-year Agriculture Science specialist course.
- 1967 2-year post secondary teacher training college course.
- 1972/73 started 3-year post secondary teacher training course
- 1972/73, a two-year specialist course in General Science and Mathematics was started in addition to the already existing Agricultural Science course.
- 1983/84 mounted a post-middle modular programme 1987/88 Certificate ‘A’ post-modular teacher programme was introduced (it was short-lived)
- 2004/2005 Diploma in Basic Education programme (Regular & Distance) and Certificate ‘A’ 4-year (Distance) course.
- 2018/19 A 4-year Bachelor of Education (B.Ed) degree in Basic Education was introduced to phase out Diploma in Basic Education (DBE).

== Departments ==
Bagabaga Of Education have six independent departments

- VOTECH Department
- Education Department
- Languages Department
- Science and Mathematics Department
- Mathematics and ICT Department
- Social Science Department

== Notable alumni ==
The college has trained more than 7,000 teachers for the Ghana Education Service across various grade levels and categories. Its alumni have held positions in several sectors of national life. Notable alumni include:

- Dr. Hilla Limann -President of the Third Republic of Ghana.
- Chief Simon Diedong Dombo - Leader of Opposition in Parliament in 1960.
- Alhaji Mumuni Bawumia - Lawyer, former diplomat, former chairman of Council of state of the Forth Republic of Ghana and former chief of Kperiga traditional area Walewale.
- Mr. Jatoe Kaleo - Minister of state of the Second Republic of Ghana.
- Mr. B. K. Adama - Minister of defence in the Second Republic of Ghana.
- Chief Abeifaa Karbo - Paramount chief of Lawra traditional area, and former chairman of Public Services Commission.
- Mr. A. A. Asumda- Minister of state in the First Republic of Ghana.
