= Pobee Biney =

Ghanaian politician and trade union activist

Alfred Pobee Biney was born in Cape Coast on 13 January 1914. Biney went to the Government school in Cape Coast. He joined Ghana Railways in April 1935 becoming a locomotive engineer driver. He joined the radical railway and harbour workers union, considered to be one of the most radical unions in the Gold Coast (present day Ghana) at the time. Biney lived next to Nana Kobina Nketsia IV, the Omanhene of Essikadu who was a supporter of Positive Action.

Biney first met Kwame Nkrumah in December 1947 when Nkrumah arrived at Takoradi on his way back from the United Kingdom to take up the role of general secretary for the United Gold Coast Convention forging a political relationship which lasted a few years. Biney had been a member of the West African Youth League and was a leading member in the Sekondi-Takoradi branch.

== Trade union activities ==
Biney emerged as a natural trade unionist, someone who would speak up for the rights of workers without prompting. This led workers with grievances to seek him our for advice and support. Because of his popularity Biney was elected President of the Railway Workers Union, Esikadu-Sekondi in 1946. He was elected Vice-President of the Trade Union Congress (TUC) in 1949. His close friend Anthony Woode became the TUC General Secretary. Biney developed a reputation as "a fighter for the suffering masses."

== General strike ==
The Meteorological workers who went on strike on 4 October 1949 were summarily dismissed. The colonial secretary, Robert Scott, had issued a circular stating that government employees who take part in the strike will be dismissed. The TUC organised a conference and resolved to call a general strike if the dismissed workers were not reinstated.

On 13 November 1949 the TUC sent a strike notice to the [acting] colonial secretary. A meeting was held with the colonial administration in Accra on 23 December 1949 to try and resolve the dispute. However the authorities declined to reinstate the sacked workers. The TUC called an emergency meeting to fix a date to commence the strike.

On the evening of 4 January 1950 the TUC called organised a rally at which Biney informed the gathered workers that a general strike would commence on 7 January. He cautioned that workers in key sectors such as health and sanitation should not strike. The strike commenced at midnight on 7 January 1950.

Less than 48 hours later the CPP led Positive Action was launched at a mass rally. The dual activities of the general strike and Positive Action triggered the colonial authorities to make multiple arrests including Biney. Many workers who participated in the strike were also dismissed from their employment.

== Trial and conviction ==
Biney was arrested on 20 January 1950 following the general strike. Five charges were levied against him, all relating to inciting people to participate in what the colonial authorities deemed an illegal strike between 4 and 11 January 1950. His trial commence on 8 February before District Magistrate W. B. Lare. According to the trial papers Biney, though represented by counsel, put up no defense. No witnesses were called on his behalf. There was no cross examination of prosecution witnesses and Biney did not take the stand. He was sentenced to eight months imprisonment on 18 February 1950 having been found guilty of all five charges and given an eight months jail sentence.

== Legislative Assembly ==
A general election was held in the Gold Coast on 8 February 1951. Biney was elected as a Member of the Legislative Assembly on the CPP ticket, beating a prominent pro-British chief, Nana Sir Tsibu Darku IX, to win in Sekondi-Takoradi.

However, together with Woode, Biney became increasingly critical in the shifting CPP stanch. Particularly the shift from Positive Action to Tactical Action, which Biney and Woode view more as conceding to the demands of the colonial authorities to the detriment of the common person in the Gold Coast.

== Later political activity ==
Biney was expelled from the CPP. Following his expulsion, along with Anthony Woode, Kwesi Lamptey, Abubekr, Yeboah Aukordich, and B. F. Kusi he attempted to form a political party, the National Reformation Party (NRP).

== Death ==
Biney was just 54 years old when he died on 29 January 1968.
