= Danquah-Dombo-Busia Tradition =

Oldest surviving political tradition in Ghana

The Danquah-Dombo-Busia tradition is the oldest surviving political tradition in Ghana that dates as far back as 1947, before Ghana attained independence. The main political figures this tradition stems from are Dr JB Danquah (founding member of the United Gold Coast Convention (UGCC)), Dr Kofi Abrefa Busia and Simon Diedong Dombo

Although this tradition dates as far back as 1947, it came to the limelight in 1957 after series of events that led to the merger of the then opposition parties to form the United Party (UP) due to the passage of the Avoidance of Discrimination Act (ADA) that banned all political parties that were formed along tribal, regional and religious lines under the Convention People's Party (CPP). This tradition remains the cornerstone of the current New Patriotic Party.
