= Bawumia =

Bawumia is a Ghanaian surname. Notable people with the surname include:

- Mahamudu Bawumia (born 1963), Ghanaian economist and banker
- Mumuni Bawumia, Ghanaian politician and writer
- Samira Bawumia (born 1980), Ghanaian politician
