= G. A. K. Dzansi =

Eastern Regional Minister
- In office 1966–1969
- President: Joseph Arthur Ankrah
- Preceded by: Joseph Essilfie Hagan
- Succeeded by: Augustine Kwame Adu

Personal details
- Born: Tanyigbe, Ho, Gold Coast
- Citizenship: Ghanaian

G. A. K. Dzansi was a Ghanaian police officer and politician. He served as the Chairman of the Eastern Regional Committee of Administration (Eastern Regional Minister) during the NLC regime from 1966 to 1969.

== Early life and education ==
Dzansi was born on 18 August 1918 at Tanyigbe in Ho. He was educated at the Ewe Presbyterian Senior School, where he graduated in 1934.

== Career ==
Dzansi begun as a pupil teacher at Leklebi Duga in 1935. On 24 June 1937 he enlisted in the Gold Coast Police service. After serving for about five years, he gained promotion as a non-commissioned officer on 1 March 1943, and on 1 October 1949, he was appointed Sub-Inspector. He became an Assistant Superintendent in February 1957, and on 15 January 1958, he was made a staff officer of the Ghana Police Service. From 1957 to 1963, he rose through the ranks to become a Chief Superintendent, and on 1 March 1964 he became an Assistant Commissioner of Police. Following the overthrow of the Nkrumah government, Dzansi was appointed chairman of the Eastern Regional Administrative Committee (Eastern Regional Minister). He served in that capacity until 1969.

== Personal life ==
Dzansi was married to Mary Adjoa Dzansi (née Adzaku). Together, they had six children; four sons and two daughters. His hobbies included playing table tennis, reading, and gardening.
