= Imoru =

Imoru is a Ghanaian masculine given name. Notable people with the name include:

- Imoru Ayarna (c. 1917–2015), Ghanaian businessman and politician
- Imoru Egala (1914–1981), foreign minister of Ghana
- Imoru Salifu, Ghanaian politician
