= Jambaidu Awuni =

Ghanaian politician

Jambaidu Wuni

Member of the Ghana Parliament for Garu
- In office 1965–1966
- Preceded by: New
- Succeeded by: Constituency abolished

Member of the Ghana Parliament for Kusasi Central
- In office 1954–1965
- Preceded by: New
- Succeeded by: Constituency abolished

Personal details
- Born: Jambaidu Awuni Gold Coast
- Party: Convention People's Party; Northern People's Party

Jambaidu Awuni was a Ghanaian politician in the first republic. He was a member of the Legislative Assembly representing the Northern territories on the ticket of the Northern People's Party (NPP) from 1951 to 1954. He was re-elected into the legislative in 1956 to represent the Kusasi Central constituency from 1956 until 1965.

Upon the demise of the Bawku Naba (Bawku chief), Awuni supported his uncle to be enskinned as the new Bawku Naba but he was unsuccessful. Awuni blamed Mumuni Bawumia for the failure and felt he could no longer remain a member of the NPP as long as Mumuni Bawumia remained a member of the party. He then resigned from the NPP and crossed carpets to join the Convention People's Party (CPP) backbenchers in parliament in August 1957. In 1965 he became the member of parliament for the Garu constituency. He remained in parliament until February 1966 when the Nkrumah government was overthrown.

== See also ==
- List of MLAs elected in the 1954 Gold Coast legislative election
- List of MLAs elected in the 1956 Gold Coast legislative election
- List of MPs elected in the 1965 Ghanaian parliamentary election
