= Joseph Boye Lomotey =

Ghanaian diplomat

Ghana Ambassador to Yugoslavia
- In office 1969–1970
- Appointed by: Presidential Commission of the Second Republic
- Preceded by: Richard Kwadwo Fosu
- Succeeded by: Yakubu Tali

Personal details
- Born: Accra, Gold Coast
- Education: Accra Academy
- Alma mater: Xavier University of Louisiana; Columbia University
- Occupation: diplomat

Joseph Boye Lomotey (born 1918) was a Ghanaian diplomat. He served as Ghana's ambassador to Yugoslavia from 1969 to 1970. He was later secretary of the National Council for Higher Education

== Early life and education ==
Joseph Lomotey attended a missionary school in Accra before entering the Accra Academy for his secondary education graduating in 1939. In high school, he was editor of the Accra Academy News for four years. In 1952, he enrolled at Xavier University, New Orleans on a Phelps Stokes Fund scholarship, for his undergraduate degree which he obtained in 1955. While at Xavier, he was the head of the All African Students Union of the Americas. He was also editor of the school's campus newspaper from 1952 to 1955.

Following his undergraduate studies, Lomotey pursued his postgraduate studies at the New York School of Social Work, Columbia University, on a Hishhorn fellowship. While at Columbia, he was selected to attend the Students International Assembly in Williamsburg, Virginia, based on his qualifications, academic record, and purpose for attendance. He obtained his master's degree in Social Work from Columbia University in 1957.

== Career ==
After his secondary education, Lomotey worked for about twelve years in the Ghanaian civil service. He also worked as a news correspondent for the Gold Coast Press. In 1952, he resigned to further his education in the United States of America.

In 1957, Lomotey entered the Ghanaian foreign service as an Executive Officer of Ghana's Permanent Mission to the United Nations. Earlier that year, as a student at Columbia, he was present at the first ever unfurling of Ghana’s Flag at the United Nations in Washington, D.C. on the opening of the Ghanaian mission at the United Nations. He was one of five Ghanaians including Seth Anthony and Robert Baffuor captured in a photograph which made for the news under the unfurled Ghana Flag.

In 1960, he was serving as First Secretary at Ghana's High Commission in India. In 1962, he became Ghana's Acting High Commissioner in India and subsequently Deputy High Commissioner to India on Seth Anthony's takeover as high commissioner.

In 1966, Lomotey became Deputy High Commissioner to the United Kingdom with Seth Anthony as high commissioner.

Prior to his ambassadorial appointment to Yugoslavia, he worked as the director of the United Nations and International Organisations division at Ghana’s Ministry of Foreign Affairs. He served as Ghana's ambassador to Yugoslavia from 1969 to 1970, when he was replaced by Alhaji Yakubu Alhassan Tali.

During the Acheampong regime, he was appointed secretary of the National Council for Higher Education. He also served as a member of the University of Ghana Council.

== Award ==
Lomotey received a posthumous award in 2018 from the Ministry of Foreign Affairs and Regional Integration.
