= Positive Action campaign =

Political activism in Ghana

The Positive Action campaign was a series of anti-imperialist and pro-independence protests and strikes during 1950 in the Gold Coast, a British colony that would later become Ghana. The campaign was marked by a general strike where workers demanded self-governance from the British Empire.

The Positive Action campaign served as an early step in the Ghanaian independence movement. Several of its lead figures, including Ghanaian politician Kwame Nkrumah and senior officials within the Ghana Trades Union Congress (TUC) were jailed by British colonial authorities for their involvement in the campaign.

== Launch of Positive Action ==
At midnight on 6 January 1950 the Trade Union Congress (TUC) declared a general strike, triggering Kwame Nkrumah to announce the start of the Positive Action campaign at a mass rally on 8 January.

Positive Action was launched to fight imperialism and demand "self government now" and independence from colonial rule by the British through a campaign of nonviolence and political education of the people. However, when Nkrumah launched the campaign, riots erupted throughout the capital, Accra.

The response of the British colonialists was to declare a state of emergency banning newspapers, including two published by Nkrumah and making sweeping arrests.

== Imprisonment ==
The response of the British colonialists was to declare a state of emergency banning newspapers, including two published by Nkrumah. and making sweeping arrests.

As well as Kwame Nkrumah, others were arrested and jailed including:

- Pobee Biney, Vice President of the TUC
- Anthony Woode, General Secretary of the TUC

However, when Nkrumah launched the campaign, riots erupted throughout the capital, Accra.

== Impact of Positive Action ==
The Positive Action campaign accelerated the march towards independence. Nkrumah was elected leader of Government Business in the Legislative Assembly in February 1951 and released from prison to take up this role. Walter Sisulu, Secretary General of the African National Congress sent a letter of congratulations which was published in the Accra Evening News, a newspaper founded by Nkrumah on 28 February 1951.

The transformation of the Gold Coast from a British colony to an independent nation was underway. The Gold Coast officially became independent Ghana on 6 March 1957.
