= Mahama Jeduah =

Ghanaian politician

Hon. Mahama Jeduah

Member of parliament
- In office 7 January 1993 – 7 January 1997
- President: Jerry John Rawlings
- Succeeded by: John Dramani Mahama

Personal details
- Born: December 19, 1944 (age 81)
- Party: National Democratic Congress
- Education: University of Cape Coast
- Occupation: Politician
- Profession: Educator

Mahama Jeduah (born 19 December 1944) is a Ghanaian politician and teacher. He served as a member of the first parliament of the fourth republic of Ghana for Bole/ Bole Bamboi constituency in the Northern region of Ghana.

== Early life and education ==
Jeduah was born on December 19, 1944, in the Northern Region of Ghana. He attended the University of Cape Coast where he obtained a diploma in science.

== Career ==
Jeduah is a former member of parliament for Bole / Bole Bamboi constituency, he served one term from 7 January 1993 to 7 January 1997. He was a teacher that time.

== Politics ==
Jeduah was elected during the 1992 Ghanaian parliamentary election on the ticket of the National Democratic Congress as member of the first parliament of the fourth republic of Ghana. He lost the seat in 1996 Ghanaian general election to John Dramani Mahama of the National Democratic Congress who won the seat with 12,436 votes, representing 81.9% of the total. He defeated Zakaria Issah of the New Patriotic Party (NPP) who obtained 2,752 votes, representing 18.1% of the total. John Dramani Mahama a former president of Ghana after John Atta Mills, became president on 24 July 2012 to 7 January 2017.

== Personal life ==
Mahama Jeduah is a Muslim.
