= Bole (Ghana parliament constituency) =

Parliamentary constituency in Ghana

Bole (Bole/Bamboi)
- constituency for the Parliament of Ghana
- District: Bole District
- Region: Savannah Region of Ghana

Current constituency
- Party: National Democratic Congress
- MP: Yusif Sulemana

Bole or Bole - Bamboi is one of the constituencies represented in the Parliament of Ghana. It elects one Member of Parliament (MP) by the first past the post system of election. Bole is located in the Bole district of the Savannah Region of Ghana.

== Boundaries ==
The seat is located within the Bole district of the Savannah Region of Ghana.

== Members of Parliament ==
First elected	Member	Party
First Republic
1965	Emmanuel Adama Mahama	Convention People's Party
Fourth Republic
1992	Mahama Jeduah	National Democratic Congress
1996	John Dramani Mahama	National Democratic Congress
2008	Joseph Akati Saaka	National Democratic Congress
Bole Bamboi
2012	Joseph Akati Saaka	National Democratic Congress
2016	Yusif Sulemana	National Democratic Congress
2020	Yusif Sulemana	National Democratic Congress
2024	Yusif Sulemana	National Democratic Congress

== Elections ==
2024 Ghanaian general election: Bole-Bamboi
Party	Candidate	Votes	%	±%
NDC	Yusif Sulemana	26,599	78.17	+10.49
NPP	Raphael Kumah Abolasom	7,426	21.83	−10.49
Majority		19,173	56.34	+20.98
Turnout		34,546		—
Registered electors				

2020 Ghanaian general election: Bole-Bamboi
Party	Candidate	Votes	%	±%
NDC	Yusif Sulemana	26,350	67.68	
NPP	David Sei Demah	12,585	32.32	
Majority		13,765	35.36	
Turnout				—
Registered electors				

MPs elected in the Ghana parliamentary election, 2008: Bole Source:Ghana Home Page
Party	Candidate	Votes	%	±%
National Democratic Congress	Joseph Akati Saaka	11,452	64.8	3.8
New Patriotic Party	Otiko Afisah Djaba	5,784	32.7	−4.4
Convention People's Party	Adams Mumuni	189	1.1	
People's National Convention	Abdulai Ahmed Abudu	160	0.9	—
Independent	Abu Issahaku	94	0.5	−1.4
Majority		5,668	32.1	4.2
Turnout		—	—	—

2004 Ghanaian parliamentary election: Bole Source:Electoral Commission of Ghana
Party	Candidate	Votes	%	±%
National Democratic Congress	John Dramani Mahama	10,974	61.0	−6.7
New Patriotic Party	Alhaji Sulemana Adams Achanso	6,675	37.1	18.0
Independent	Abdulai Ahmed Abudu	342	1.9	—
Majority		312	27.9	−20.7
Turnout		18,205	79.8	—

2000 Ghanaian parliamentary election: Bole Source:Adam Carr's Election Archive
Party	Candidate	Votes	%	±%
National Democratic Congress	John Dramani Mahama	9,109	67.7	−14.2
New Patriotic Party	Sulemana A. Achanso	2,566	19.1	1.0
Convention People's Party	Frank Langa Dari	710	5.3	—
National Reform Party	Richard Tetteh	510	3.8	—
People's National Convention	Tawiah James Mensah	354	2.6	—
United Ghana Movement	Alhassan Abudulai	203	1.5	—
Majority		6,543	48.6	−15.2
Turnout		13,452		—

1996 Ghanaian parliamentary election: Bole Source:Electoral Commission of Ghana
Party	Candidate	Votes	%	±%
National Democratic Congress	John Dramani Mahama	12,436	81.9	—
New Patriotic Party	Zakaria Issah	2,752	18.1	—
Majority		9,684	63.8	—
Turnout		15,188	75.3	—

1992 Ghanaian parliamentary election: Bole Source:Electoral Commission of Ghana
Party	Candidate	Votes	%	±%
National Democratic Congress	Mahama Jeduah			—
Majority				—
Turnout				—

== See also ==
- List of Ghana Parliament constituencies
