= J. W. O. Adjemang =

Ghanaian politician

Upper Regional Minister
- In office 1966–1967
- President: Joseph Arthur Ankrah
- Preceded by: Ayeebo Asumda
- Succeeded by: Imoru Lafia

Personal details
- Born: Gold Coast
- Citizenship: Ghanaian

J. W. O. Adjemang was a Ghanaian civil servant, politician and, member of the National Liberation Council. He was the Assistant Commissioner of the Ghana Police Service and the Commissioner for the Upper Region (now divided into the Upper East Region and the Upper West Region) from 1966 to 1967. He was succeeded by Imoru Lafia.
