= Hans Kofi Boni =

Ghanaian politician (born 1927)

Honourable Hans Kofi Boni

MP for Ho West
- In office 11 August 1960 – 1965
- President: Kwame Nkrumah
- Preceded by: Kodzo Ayeke
- Parliamentary group: Convention People's Party
- Constituency: Ho West

Minister for Food and Nutrition
- In office 1965–1966
- President: Kwame Nkrumah
- Preceded by: Joseph Kodzo

Volta Regional Commissioner
- In office 1961–1965
- President: Kwame Nkrumah
- Preceded by: Francis Yao Asare
- Succeeded by: Joseph Kodzo

Personal details
- Born: 1927 (age 98–99) Gold Coast
- Education: Zion Senior High School

Hans Kofi Boni (born 1927) is a Ghanaian politician during the first republic of Ghana. He was the Member of parliament (MP) for Ho West.

== Member of parliament ==
Boni was a member of the Convention People's Party (CPP) led by Kwame Nkrumah. He was elected as the MP for Ho West during the first republic. He was sworn in on 11 August 1960. In the 1965 Ghanaian parliamentary election, 198 MPs representing the CPP were elected unopposed following the increase in the powers of the President of Ghana by the 1964 Constitutional Amendments. He served as the member of parliament for Yingor constituency until the 24th February 1966 coup d'état which overthrew the civilian government and replaced it with the National Liberation Council (NLC) military government.

== Minister in government ==
Boni served as the Volta Regional Commissioner between 1961 and 1965 in the Nkrumah government. He was one of seven Regional Commissioners (Regional Ministers) invited by the United States to tour the USA following their visit to the Soviet Union. While in this position, Boni who is a native of Kpedze, advised the Kpedze Youth Association to invest in the construction of a secondary school. This led to the foundation of the Kpedze Senior High School in October 1962.

== Jail sentence ==
In 1969, Boni was sentenced to six years imprisonment with "productive hard labour" by an Accra High Court presided over by Justice E. K. Wiredu. He was found guilty together with Joseph Kodzo of inappropriate disbursement of funds of the then Industrial Development Corporation (IDC). They were both former Volta Regional Commissioners in Kwame Nkrumah's government. His defence was that he was carrying out the orders of Nkrumah but this was not accepted by the presiding judge.

== Later life ==
As of July 2024, Boni is the last living minister who served in the Cabinet of Kwame Nkrumah.

Parliament of Ghana
Preceded by Kojo Ayeke	Ho West MP; 1960 – 1965	Succeeded by ?
Preceded by ?	Yingor MP; 1965 – 1966	Succeeded by ?
Political offices
Preceded by Francis Yao Asare	Volta Regional Commissioner; 1961 – 1965	Succeeded by Joseph Kodzo
Preceded by Joseph Kodzo	Minister for Food and Nutrition; 1965 –?	Succeeded by ?
