= R. J. G. Dontoh =

Ghanaian soldier

Central Regional Minister
- In office 1966–1967
- President: Joseph Arthur Ankrah
- Preceded by: Emmanuel Humphrey Tettey Korboe
- Succeeded by: Brigadier Alexander Crabbe

Personal details
- Born: R. J. G. Dontoh Gold Coast
- Citizenship: Ghanaian

R. J. G. Dontoh was a Ghanaian soldier. He served as the Chairman of the Central Regional Committee of Administration (Central Regional Minister) during the NLC regime from 1966 to 1967.

== Early life and education ==
Dontoh's early formative years begun at the Winneba Methodist School where he obtained the Elementary School Certificate. He joined M. G. Ollivant Limited as an accountancy student with the association of Accountants, and worked there as an article clerk from February 1949 to February 1952 when he was awarded an Intermediate Diploma for international accountancy. Following his enlistment in the army in 1952, he studied courses in General Education for his Ordinary level (O-Level) certificate and also passed the WAF entrance examination. In 1957, he enrolled at the Regular Officers Special Training School at the Teshie (now Military Academy). He later took courses in Armoured Welfare at the Armoured Corp Training Centre in the UK. From January 1964 to September 1964, he studied at the Junior Staff College at the Defence College.

== Career ==
In 1952, Dontoh enlisted in the Ghana (then Gold Coast) Army and rose through the ranks to become a sergeant. After his training at the Teshie Military School and Officers Training School at Eaton Hall, he was commissioned second Lieutenant. Upon his arrival to Ghana in January 1958, he was posted on the 2nd Battalion of infantry. In 1959, he was elevated to the post of a captain, and a year later, he was posted to serve with the 2nd Battalion of infantry in the Congo. He later became a liaison officer when he was seconded to the United Nations Peace Keeping Force in the Congo, and due to his performance in executing his duties, he was mentioned in dispatches. He was appointed Commander of the United Nations Forces in the Congo, and returned to Ghana in 1961 to join the Ghana Reece Squadron. He was attached to the British tanks; unit 2 Royal Tanks in North America to train in Armoured Welfare. Following his training in Armoured Welfare in the United Kingdom, Dontoh became a Squadron Leader and took charge of 2 Recce Army in September 1961 as a Major. On 31 May 1963, he became the Commanding Officer of the Reece Regiment. He was commander of the Reece Regiment operating in the Flagstaff house during the 24 February 1966 coup d'état. After the coup, he was elevated to the position of Lieutenant-colonel and subsequently appointed Chairman of the Central Regional Administrative Committee (now Central Regional Minister).

== See also ==
- National Liberation Council
