= Gibson Dokyi Ampaw =

Ghanaian politician and lawyer

Member of the Ghana Parliament for Abuakwa
- In office 1969–1972

Minister for Health
- In office 1969–1971
- President: Edward Akufo-Addo
- Prime Minister: Kofi Abrefa Busia
- Preceded by: Eustace Akwei
- Succeeded by: Simon Diedong Dombo

Personal details
- Born: Gibson Dokyi Ampaw; 25 September 1929 Kukurantumi, East Akim District, Gold Coast
- Education: Abuakwa State College; Fourah Bay College; University of London

Gibson Dokyi Ampaw (born 25 September 1929, date of death unknown) was a Ghanaian lawyer and politician. He was a minister of state in the second republic.

== Early life and education ==
Ampaw was born on 26 September 1929 at Kukurantumi, East Akim District in the Eastern Region. He had his secondary education at Abuakwa State College, Kibi. He attended Fourah Bay College, Sierra Leone and the University of London, London where he was called to the bar at Lincoln's Inn.

== Career ==
Ampaw began his career as a teacher at his alma mater Abuakwa State College. He was later appointed secretary of the Akyem Abuakwa State Council, and also taught at Wilberforce Memorial. He ventured into legal practice for eleven years as a barrister-at-law. Prior to politics he was a member of the board of directors of the Ghana Commercial Bank; he was a member of the bank's delegation which went to Lome, Togo to explore the possibility of opening a branch of the bank there. He also held directorship in various companies including Trans-Africa Engineering and Motor Industry (Ghana) Ltd., Susco Diamond Company, Accra Water Distillery Company and Industrial Agencies Ltd.

== Politics ==
From 1969 to 1972 Ampaw was the member of parliament representing Abuakwa. He was appointed Minister for Health in 1969 and he served in that capacity until 1971.

== Personal life and death ==
Ampaw was married with seven children. He was a Christian and his hobbies included football, volleyball, music and walking.

Ampaw died prior to 2015.

== See also ==
Minister for Health (Ghana)
