= Augustine Kwame Adu =

Ghanaian academic

Ghana Ambassador to Mexico
- In office 1970 – February 1972
- President: Kofi Abrefa Busia

Eastern Regional Chief Executive
- In office 1969–1970
- President: Kofi Abrefa Busia
- Preceded by: G. A. K. Dzansi
- Succeeded by: G. L. A. Djabanor

Personal details
- Born: Augustine Kwame Adu; 14 August 1926 Koforidua, Eastern Region, Gold Coast
- Education: University of Nottingham; University of Ghana; St. Augustine's College
- Occupation: Lawyer, Diplomat

Augustine Kwame Adu also known as Augustine Kwame Adu Amankwah was a Ghanaian academic, politician, diplomat and lawyer. He taught in various schools earlier in his career. He served as the Regional Chief Executive of the Eastern Region (Regional minister) and Ghana's ambassador to Mexico. He ventured into law later in his career.

== Early life ==
Adu was born on 14 August 1926 at Koforidua, New Juaben in the Eastern Region. He had his early education from 1935 to 1943. In August 1944 he entered St. Augustine's College. He received his certificate in 1948. He studied English for his bachelors at the University College of Gold Coast in 1952, he later studied philosophy and Latin in the same university in 1956. He proceeded to the University of Nottingham on a British Council Scholarship. There he obtained his diploma in English studies in 1960. In 1972 he received an LLB (London) and was called to the English bar in July 1972.

== Career ==
=== Academic ===
He first taught at Mount Mary College of Education after his secondary education from 1948 to 1950. He later joined the St. Thomas Aquinas Senior High School staff from 1950 to 1952. He returned to Mount Mary College of Education in 1958 and rose through the ranks to become the school's vice principal. In 1963 he became the headmaster of Opoku Ware School.

=== Politics ===
In 1969 shortly after Ghana had become a republic he was appointed as Regional Chief Executive of the Eastern Region (Eastern Regional Minister) in the Busia government.

=== Diplomatic appointment ===
After a year of serving as Regional Chief Executive of the Eastern Region he was appointed Ghana's ambassador to Mexico. He served in this capacity until 1972 when the Busia government was overthrown by the SMC.

== Later years ==
He left for London after the SMC coup d'état. He was called to the Ghanaian bar in October 1973. He was Supreme Knight of the Nobel order of the Knights of Marshall from 1994-1996.

== Personal life ==
He is the father of trade unionist Kwasi Adu Amankwah.
