= E. Q. Q. Sanniez =

Ghanaian Civil servant and politician

Volta Regional Minister
- In office 1966–1967
- President: Joseph Arthur Ankrah
- Preceded by: Joseph Kodzo
- Succeeded by: Lt. Col. E. N. Dedjoe

Personal details
- Born: Gold Coast
- Citizenship: Ghanaian

E. Q. Q. Sanniez was a Ghanaian civil servant, politician, and member of the National Liberation Council. He was the Assistant Commissioner of the Ghana Police Service, and the Volta Regional Minister from 1966 to 1967. He was succeeded by Lt. Col. E. N. Dedjoe, a former Quartermaster of Emmanuel Kwasi Kotoka.
