= Osei Owusu Afriyie =

Ghanaian lawyer and politician (born 1923)

Minister for Health
- In office 15 June 1965 – 24 February 1966
- President: Kwame Nkrumah
- Preceded by: Joseph Kodzo
- Succeeded by: Eustace Akwei

Minister of Labour and Social Welfare
- In office 1961–1965
- President: Kwame Nkrumah
- Preceded by: R. O. Amoako-Atta
- Succeeded by: Susanna Al-Hassan

Regional Commissioner for the Ashanti Region
- In office 1960–1961
- President: Dr. Kwame Nkrumah
- Preceded by: R. O. Amoako-Atta
- Succeeded by: R. O. Amoako-Atta

Member of Parliament for Asokwa
- In office 1965 – February 1966
- Preceded by: New
- Succeeded by: K.G. Osei Bonsu

Member of Parliament for Kumasi South
- In office 1959–1965
- Preceded by: Kurankyi-Taylor
- Succeeded by: Constituency abolished

Personal details
- Born: Osei Hyiaman Owusu Afriyie; 19 September 1923 Amoafu near Bekwai, Ashanti Region
- Citizenship: Ghanaian
- Education: Achimota School; Fourah Bay College; King's College, Newcastle; London School of Economics

Osei Hyiaman Owusu Afriyie (born 19 September 1923) was a Ghanaian lawyer and politician. He was as a minister of state during the first republic. He served in various ministerial portfolios, some of which include serving as Minister of Labour and Social Welfare and also serving as Minister of Health.

== Early life and education ==
Afriyie was born on 19 September 1923 at Amoafu near Bekwai in the Ashanti Region. He began his elementary education at the Bekwai Methodist School from 1929 to 1937 there after he continued at Achimota College now Achimota School in 1938 taking the School Certificate Examination in 1941. After 18 months of service as a Second Division Clerk in the then Education Department he was awarded an Ashanti Confederacy Scholarship to Fourah Bay College, Sierra Leone in 1945. There he studied economics, political science and commerce. He obtained his bachelor of commerce degree from King's College then a college of the University of Durham, England in 1948. He was awarded a two-year Scholarship to study journalism at King's College, Newcastle-on-Tyne a year later by the Asanteman Council. He worked as a student journalist during that period on the Northern Echo, the Hampshire Chronicle and on the West Africa contributing articles to these newspapers.

== Career and politics ==
Afriyie returned to Ghana in 1950 and was appointed State Secretary to the Offinso Traditional Authority. There he served for about 18 months and in 1952 he returned to England to study law at the London School of Economics. He obtained his Bachelor of Laws Degree and was called to the Bar at the Lincoln's Inn in 1956. He returned to Ghana and was called to the Ghana bar on 29 March 1957. He then set up his own chambers (Bretuo Chambers) in Kumasi.

In 1959 he was in invited by some members of the Kumasi South Constituency to stand for elections to represent the constituency in parliament. He stood on the ticket of the Convention People's Party and won the election entering parliament on 13 April 1959. He remained in private legal practice until July 1960 when he was appointed Regional Commissioner (Regional Minister) for the Ashanti Region. In October 1961 he was appointed Minister of Labour and Social Welfare a portfolio that later evolved into Social Welfare and Community Development and in February 1965 he became the Minister for Health. He served in this capacity until 24 February 1966 when the Nkrumah government was overthrown. He resumed private practice in 1967 until he was enstooled as the Omanhene of Adankraja Ashanti in 1972.

== Personal life ==
Afriyie married Grace Owusu Afriyie (née Ellis) while he was in Britain.
