= Minister for Health (Ghana) =

The Minister for Health is the Ghanaian government official responsible for the Ministry of Health.

== List of ministers ==
Number	Minister	Took office	Left office	Government	Party
1	J. H. Allassani (MP)	6 March 1957	July 1959	Nkrumah government	Convention People's Party
2	Imoru Egala (MP)	July 1959	July 1960	Nkrumah government	Convention People's Party
3	Lawrence Rosario Abavana (MP)	July 1960	June 1961	Nkrumah government	Convention People's Party
4	Komla Agbeli Gbedemah (MP)	June 1961		Nkrumah government	Convention People's Party
5	Lawrence Rosario Abavana (MP)	October 1963	January 1964	Nkrumah government	Convention People's Party
6	Joseph Kodzo (MP)	December 1964	June 1965	Nkrumah government	Convention People's Party
7	Osei Owusu Afriyie (MP)	June 1965	February 1966	Nkrumah government	Convention People's Party
8	Eustace Akwei	1966	1969	National Liberation Council	Military government
9	Gibson Dokyi Ampaw (MP)	1969	January 1971	Busia government	Progress Party
10	Simon Diedong Dombo (MP)	January 1971	January 1972	Busia government	Progress Party
11	Colonel J. C. Adjeitey	1972	1973	National Redemption Council	Military government
12	Lt. Colonel Anthony Hugh Selormey	May 1973	October 1975	National Redemption Council	Military government
13	Brigadier Odartey-Wellington	1975	?	Supreme Military Council	Military government
14	Abeifaa Karbo	July 1977	November 1978	Supreme Military Council	Military government
15				Supreme Military Council	Military government
16	Emmanuel Evans Anfom	June 1979	September 1979	Armed Forces Revolutionary Council	Military government
17	Michael Paul Ansah (MP)	September 1979	August 1981	Limann government	People's National Party
18	Kwamena Ocran	August 1981	31 December 1981	Limann government	People's National Party
19	Charles Buadu	1983	1987	Provisional National Defence Council	Military government
20	Air Commodore F. W. K. Klutse	1987	1988	Provisional National Defence Council	Military government
21	Nana Akuoko Sarpong	1988	1991	Provisional National Defence Council	Military government
22	Stephen Obimpeh	1992	7 January 1993	Provisional National Defence Council	Military government
22	Stephen Obimpeh	August 1994	1996	Rawlings government	National Democratic Congress
23	Eunice Brookman-Amissah	1996	1998	Rawlings government	National Democratic Congress
24	Samuel Nuamah Donkor	1998	February 2000	Rawlings government	National Democratic Congress
25	Kwame Danso-Boafo	February 2000	7 January 2001	Rawlings government	National Democratic Congress
26	Richard Winfred Anane (MP)	2001	2003	Kufuor government	New Patriotic Party
27	Kwaku Afriyie	2003	2005	Kufuor government	New Patriotic Party
28	Courage Quashigah	2005	7 January 2009	Kufuor government	New Patriotic Party
29	George Sipa-Adjah Yankey	2009	2009	Mills government	National Democratic Congress
30	Benjamin Kunbuor (MP)	2009	2011	Mills government	National Democratic Congress
31	Joseph Yieleh Chireh (MP)	2011	2012	Mills government	National Democratic Congress
32	Alban Bagbin (MP)	26 January 2012	24 July 2012	Mills government	National Democratic Congress
32	Alban Bagbin (MP)	24 July 2012	7 January 2013	Mahama government	National Democratic Congress
33	Hanny-Sherry Ayitey	14 February 2013	16 July 2014	Mahama government	National Democratic Congress
34	Kwaku Agyemang-Mensah	16 July 2014	14 March 2015	Mahama government	National Democratic Congress
35	Alex Segbefia	16 March 2015	6 January 2017	Mahama government	National Democratic Congress
36	Kwaku Agyemang-Manu (MP)	28 January 2017	14 February 2024	Akufo-Addo government	New Patriotic Party
37	Bernard Okoe-Boye	14 February 2024	January 6 2025	Akufo-Addo government	New Patriotic Party
38	Kwabena Mintah Akandoh	February 2025	Incumbent	Mahama government from 2025	National Democratic Congress (Ghana)
