= Volta Regional Minister =

The Volta Regional Minister is the Ghana government official who is responsible for overseeing the administration of the Volta Region of Ghana. The boundaries of the Volta Region have changed at various times in Ghana's history. Following the December 2018 referendums, the region has been divided into two with the northern part becoming the Oti Region and the southern part remaining as the Volta Region. There are currently sixteen administrative regions in Ghana.

== List of Volta Regional Ministers ==
Number	Minister	Took office	Left office	Government	Party
1	C. H. Chapman (MP)	November 1957	June 1959	Nkrumah government	Convention Peoples' Party
2	Ferdinand Koblavi Dra Goka (MP)	June 1959	June 1960	Nkrumah government	Convention Peoples' Party
3	Francis Yao Asare (MP)	1960	1961	Nkrumah government	Convention Peoples' Party
4	Hans Kofi Boni (MP)	October 1961	July 1965	Nkrumah government	Convention Peoples' Party
5	Joseph Kodzo (MP)	July 1965	February 1966	Nkrumah government	Convention Peoples' Party
6	E. Q. Q. Sanniez	February 1966	May 1966	National Liberation Council	Military government
7	Lt. Col. E. N. Dedjoe	May 1966	July 1967	National Liberation Council	Military government
8	Lt. Col. E. A. Yeboah	July 1967	June 1968	National Liberation Council	Military government
9	E. C. Beckley	1968	1969	National Liberation Council	Military government
10	Alfred Senaya Kpodonu (MP)	October 1969	January 1972	Busia government	Progress Party
11	Major P. K. D. Habadah (Regional Commissioner)	January 1972	May 1973	National Redemption Council	Military government
12	Colonel E. O. Nyante (Regional Commissioner)	May 1973	January 1974	National Redemption Council	Military government
13	Colonel J. A. Kabore (Regional Commissioner)	January 1974	October 1975	National Redemption Council	Military government
14	Lt. Colonel G. K. Amevor (Regional Commissioner)	October 1975	June 1979	Supreme Military Council	Military government
14	Lt. Colonel G. K. Amevor (Regional Commissioner)	June 1979	September 1979	Armed Forces Revolutionary Council	Military government
15	Nelson Agbesi (MP)	October 1979	November 1979	Limann government	People's National Party
16	D.Y. Agumey	October 1979	December 1980	Limann government	People's National Party
17	F. Q. Amegah	December 1980	December 1981	Limann government	People's National Party
18	Francis Agbley (Regional Secretary)	1982	1982	Provisional National Defence Council	Military government
19	Yao Fiagbe (Regional Secretary)	1982	January 1983	Provisional National Defence Council	Military government
20	A.K. Asamoah-Tutu	1983	April 1984	Provisional National Defence Council	Military government
21	Colonel C. K. Amable	April 1984	July 1984	Provisional National Defence Council	Military government
22	Air Commodore F. W. Klutse			Provisional National Defence Council	Military government
23	Richard Seglah (Regional Secretary)	1986	?	Provisional National Defence Council	Military government
24	Modestus Yao Z. Ahiable (MP)	1993	1997	Rawlings government	National Democratic Congress
25	Lt. Col. Charles K. Agbenaza	1997	2001	Rawlings government	National Democratic Congress
26	Kwasi Owusu-Yeboa	2001	2005	Kufuor government	New Patriotic Party
27	Kofi Dzamesi	2005	January 2009	Kufuor government	New Patriotic Party
28	Joseph Amenowode (MP)	2009	July 2012	Mills government	National Democratic Congress
29	Henry Ford Kamel (MP)	March 2012	December 2012	Mills government	National Democratic Congress
30	Helen Ntoso (MP)	2013	March 2013	Mahama government	National Democratic Congress
31	Joshua Nii Laryea Afotey-Agbo (MP)	March 2013	July 2014	Mahama government	National Democratic Congress
32	Helen Ntoso (MP)	July 2014	January 2017	Mahama government	National Democratic Congress
33	Archibald Letsa	February 2017	January 2025	Akufo-Addo government	New Patriotic Party
34	James Gunu	January 2025	Incumbent	Mahama 2nd government	National Democratic Congress

== See also ==
- Ministers of the Ghanaian Government
- Volta Region
- Trans-Volta Togoland
