= Ibrahim Mahama (businessman) =

Ghanaian businessman (born 1971)

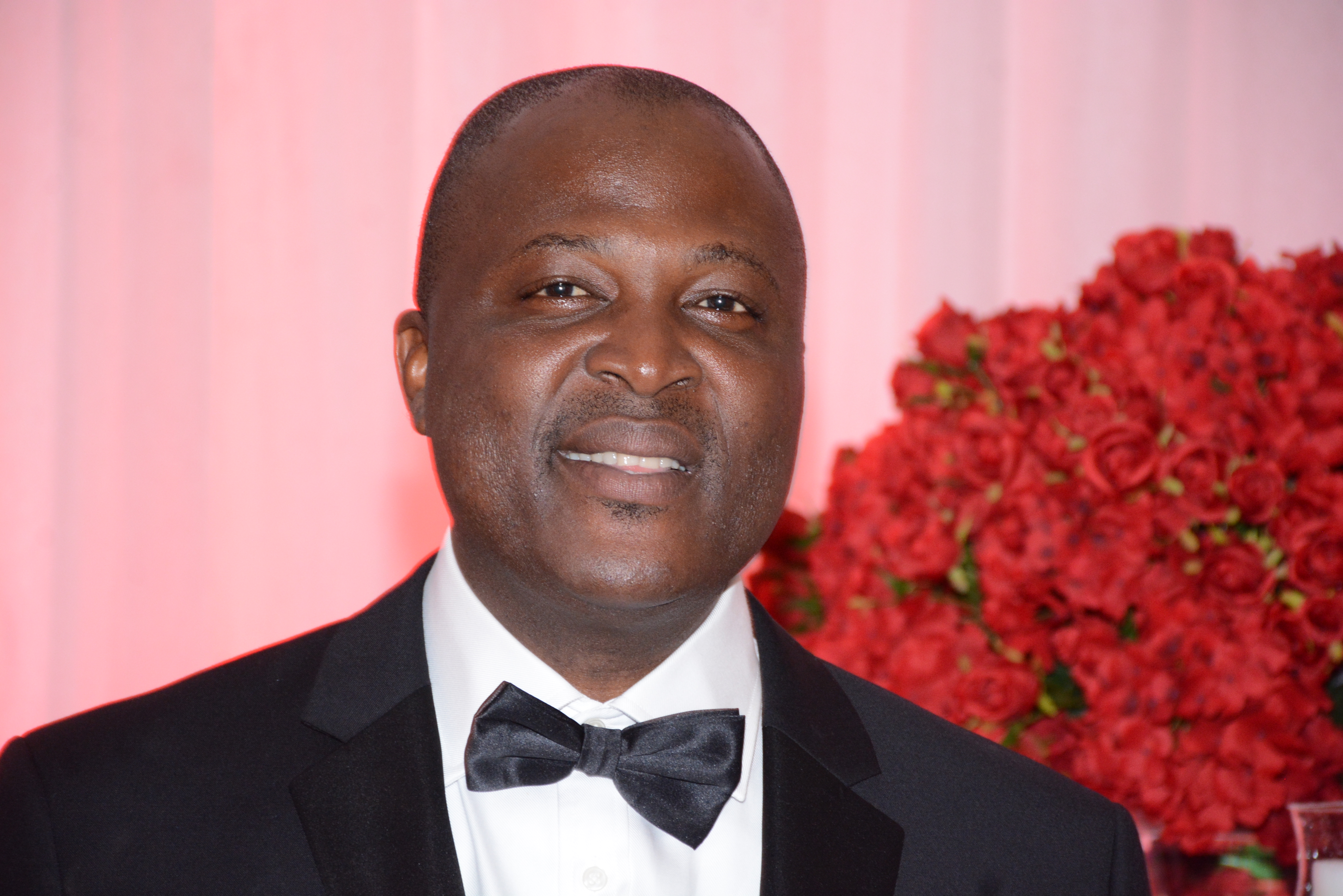
- Mahama in 2014
- Born: 29 January 1971 (age 55); Tamale, Northern Region of Ghana, Ghana
- Education: Tamale Senior High School
- Alma mater: College of North West London
- Occupation: Businessman
- Organization(s): Engineers and Planners, Dzata Cement Limited, Asutsuare Poultry Farms, Man Bosch Ghana (MBG) Ltd.
- Parent(s): Emmanuel Adama Mahama; Joyce Tamakloe
- Relatives: John Dramani Mahama (brother)

Ibrahim Mahama (born 29 January 1971) is a Ghanaian businessman and founder of Engineers and Planners, a West African indigenously owned mining company. He owns other businesses in Ghana, including Dzata Cement Limited. He is the younger brother of the current President of Ghana John Dramani Mahama.

== Early life ==
Mahama was born in Piase, in the Northern Region of Ghana to Emmanuel Adama Mahama, the first Minister of State of the Northern Region under the first President of Ghana, Kwame Nkrumah. His mother, Joyce Tamakloe, comes from Keta, in the Volta Region of Ghana.

Mahama moved to the United Kingdom to study at the College of North London. After graduation, he went on to live in London, where he worked for a property development company.

== Career ==
Mahama started his company, Engineers & Planners, in 1997 after his return from London. His company now employs over 3,000 Ghanaian employees.

On 7 April 2026, Engineers and Planners secured the lease of the Darmang Mine.

Mahama has invested in Asutsuare Poultry Farms, which was started in 2004 and produces 150,000 eggs and 10,000 live broilers per day.

Mahama is also an investor and an owner of Dzata Cement Limited, an exclusively Ghanaian-owned cement processing factory located in Tema. Construction of the factory began in 2011, and the operations started in 2018. It is projected to create 1,200 direct jobs.
