= College of North West London =

Location
- Dudden Hill Lane; London, NW10 2XD; England
- Coordinates: 51°33′05″N 0°14′41″W

Information
- Type: Further Education
- Established: 1891–1991 – founding institutions 1991 – College of North West London; 2017 – constituent college of United Colleges Group
- Local authority: London Borough of Brent
- Department for Education URN: 130429 Tables
- Ofsted: Reports
- Principal: Stephen Davis
- Gender: Mixed
- Age: 14 to no upper age limit
- Enrolment: 11,000+ (2015)
- Website: www.cnwl.ac.uk

The College of North West London (CNWL) is a large further education college in north-west London, England. It was established in 1991 by the merger between Willesden Technical College and Kilburn Polytechnic in the London Borough of Brent. Today there are two campuses in the borough, in Willesden and Wembley Park, while a smaller training centre also exists in King's Cross in the borough of Camden. Over 11,000 students were enrolled at the college as of 2015.

In August 2017, the College of North West London legally merged with City of Westminster College (CWC) to form United Colleges Group. However, both CNWL and CWC are maintaining public use of their original names, logos and identities.

== History ==
CNWL can trace it roots back to 1891, and the formation of Willesden Polytechnic, on the site of its former campus in Kilburn.

From 1893, the Willesden committee for technical education organized classes in Willesden Town Hall. In 1896 Middlesex County Council bought the St. Lawrence institute in Priory Park Road, and by 1898 The Willesden Polytechnic was formed, with 1,571 students. A new building was developed for the polytechnic, opening in 1904 on Glengall Road, Kilburn. As World War I took a toll on the male working-class population, the polytechnic offered a course in 1917 to women between the ages of 18 and 35 in light woodwork for aeroplane components.

From 1932, Middlesex County Council undertook a large development in Willesden, and in 1934 split the polytechnic into Kilburn Polytechnic (on the original site), and the new Willesden College of Technology. By 1934, the original St. Lawrence Institute building had been demolished, and replaced by the present four-storey block. By 1978 there were 1,400 full-time and 4,500 part-time enrolments.

Willesden College of Technology opened in Denzil Road in 1934, to provide the technical courses originally provided by the polytechnic, including the schools of art and building. In 1964 the college took over the buildings of Dudden Hill Lane school. The art school closed in 1959, and in 1969 the school of building amalgamated with other schools to form Swaminarayan School Sladebrook High School. There were 8,000 enrolments in 1978.

In 1991, the sites again merged, to become the College of North West London (CNWL).

In 2017, CNWL merged with the City of Westminster College to create the United Colleges Group.

== Today ==
CNWL now offers a broad range of courses, from entry level through to Foundation Degrees, Apprenticeships and HNC/HNDs. On-site facilities are for enrolled students. Its Hair and Beauty Salons at the Wembley Campus are open to the public.

The College provides qualifications and training courses to school leavers, adults learners and employers in around 20 sectors including construction, computing, engineering and care.

=== Willesden Campus ===
Developed in 1934 as the Willesden College of Technology, Willesden is the college's main centre. It is situated in Dudden Hill Lane. The entrance is now located on Denzil Road.

Courses range from Access courses (entry to university), BTEC Diplomas and Certificates and GCSEs to Foundation degrees and higher education qualifications.

The Telford building was opened officially in March 2009 by Lord Young of the government's Department for Innovation, Universities and Skills. It provides training facilities for the Faculty of Technology.

The front building viewed from Dudden Hill Lane (known as "Edison") of the Willesden Campus was demolished in 2015 and there are plans to replace it with a new facility. Planning permission is yet to be submitted. The main entrance is currently located on Denzil Road.

=== Wembley Park Campus ===
The Wembley Park campus opened in September 1995. This campus is now based at Crescent house, located just outside Wembley Park Underground station. Teaching in English, Maths, ESOL, Business, Accounting and hair and beauty is based at this Campus. The Hair and Beauty salons are open to the general public.

The building was refurbished in 2012 and re-opened in November 2012 by Gino D'Acampo.

=== King's Cross Centre ===
Since Summer 2016 the college has managed the King's Cross Construction Skills Centre, in partnership with Camden Council. The Centre provides training in the construction sector for full-time and part-time students, and for apprentices.

=== Kilburn Campus (closed 2010) ===
The original part of the site dates to 1890, with Art Deco additions in the 1930s with the development of Kilburn Polytechnic. A brand new £5-million college centre was opened in Priory Park Road on 31 August 2007 by the then Mayor of London Ken Livingstone. The Mayor told guests "To come here and see something as beautiful as this – it makes you want to do a course just to enjoy the building." He also added that "this college has been designed as a role model for what we want across London, which is to give people the opportunity to get in on the first rung of education and get the skills they want in life." Principal Vicki Fagg described the building as "architecturally stunning", while assistant principal Malcolm Rapier remarked: "It is a real statement for further education students and for Kilburn."

In May 2008, the centre won second prize in the RIBA / LSC Further Education Design Excellence Awards, with the judges complementing the college on its contribution to the regeneration of Kilburn.

In March 2010, the college announced that it would close operations at Kilburn from September 2010. The courses taught at Kilburn were transferred to the college's sites at Willesden and Wembley.

In November 2010, the local Times newspaper reported that the college was planning to sell the Kilburn campus. The sale of the site was completed in 2014.

== Honours ==
Ofsted recently gave CNWL a grade of Good in January 2016 and December 2024.https://reports.ofsted.gov.uk/provider/31/130423

== Higher Education partnership and affiliations ==
The College of North West London runs a number of Higher Education qualifications and has close links with:

- Middlesex University
- University of Westminster
- London South Bank University

== Notable alumni ==
- Albert Adomah, Ghanaian footballer
- Nonso Anozie, actor
- James Degale MBE, boxer & Olympic gold medallist
- Robert Evans, MEP and Member of the Corporation of the College of North West London
- Goran Kostic, actor
- Roger Moorhouse, historian & author
- Stuart Pearce MBE, England Under-21 football manager
- Samuel Roukin, actor
- Tommy Nutter, fashion designer
- Ibrahim Mahama, Ghanaian businessman (founder of Engineers and Planners)
