= Ayeebo Asumda =

Ghanaian politician

Regional Commissioner for the Upper Region
- In office July 1960 – 24 February 1966
- President: Dr. Kwame Nkrumah
- Preceded by: New
- Succeeded by: J. W. O. Adjemang

Member of Parliament for Kusanaba
- In office 1965 – 24 February 1966
- Succeeded by: Constituency Abolished

Member of Parliament for Kusasi West
- In office 1951–1965
- Succeeded by: Constituency Abolished

Personal details
- Born: Ayeebo Asumda; 24 January 1924 Gold Coast
- Died: 2002
- Citizenship: Ghanaian
- Education: Tamale Teacher Training College

Ayeebo Asumda (1924-2002) was a Ghanaian educationist and politician. He served as a minister of state during the first republic. He was the first regional commissioner (regional minister) for the Upper Region. A region that comprised what we know today as the Upper East Region and the Upper West Region. He served as a member of parliament for the Kusasi West electoral district and later the Kusanaba electoral district. He also served as a member of the council of state during the fourth republic.

== Early life and education ==
Asumda was born on 24 January 1924 to Abugure Kusasi (his father) and Abana Kusasi (his mother). His name Ayeebo was adopted from his uncle who was called Atia Ayeebo Kusanaba. His uncle was responsible for his education and up bringing. Asumda begun his early education at Gambaga Primary School in 1931. He later transferred to Tamale Government Boys School in 1939 for his middle school education. He obtained his standard 7 certificate in 1942 and entered the Tamale Teacher Training College (now Bagabaga College of Education) in 1945. He was awarded his teachers' Certificate 'B' after two years of training.

== Career and politics ==
Prior to entering the Tamale Teacher Training College in 1945 Asumda was employed as a pupil teacher for a period of two years. In 1946 Asumda took a teaching appointment at Zebilla and taught there until 1951 when he decided to venture politics. In 1951 Asumda was nominated to represent the Kusasi West constituency in the National Assembly. He stood for the seat in 1954 and 1956 and won on both occasions. He remained in parliament until 1966 when the Nkrumah government was overthrown. During his tenure in parliament until July 1960 when he was appointed as Regional Commissioner for the Upper Region, Asumda served as parliamentary secretary (ministerial secretary or deputy minister) for various ministries, some of which include the Ministry of Works, the Ministry of Justice, the Ministry of Trade and Industry and the Ministry of Health and Social welfare. Asumda remained Regional Commissioner for the Upper Region from July 1960 to 24 February 1966.

== Personal life ==
Asumda had two brothers; Anyagre Azampaka and Anyagibila Azampaka and a sister; Aryapoka Azampaka. In 1946 he married two wives; Madam Ateedpagira and Madam Ayineem. His marriage with Madam Ayineem was dissolved in 1951. In 1953 he married Madam Atesikongi and in 1954 he married Madam Ayelsabliga Batuure. He also married Hajara Mohammed, his youngest wife, in 1963.

== Death and legacy ==
Asumda died in 2002. He was buried in Kusanaba a town in the Bawku West District of the Upper East Region. In 2006 the then vice president Alhaji Aliu Mahama launched the Asumda foundation for education. The aim of the foundation is to support the pursuit of culture, education and sports in the Northern, Upper East and Upper West regions.

== See also ==
- List of MLAs elected in the 1954 Gold Coast legislative election
- List of MLAs elected in the 1956 Gold Coast legislative election
- List of MPs elected in the 1965 Ghanaian parliamentary election
