= Eustace Akwei =

Ghanaian medical doctor

7th Minister for Health (Ghana)
- In office 1966–1969
- President: Joseph Ankrah
- Vice President: John Willie Kofi Harlley
- Preceded by: Osei Owusu Afriyie
- Succeeded by: Gibson Dokyi Ampaw

1st Chief Medical Officer
- In office 1955–1959
- Monarch: Queen Elizabeth II
- Prime Minister: Kwame Nkrumah
- Governor: Charles Noble Arden-Clarke

Personal details
- Born: 3 December 1913
- Profession: Medical doctor

Eustace Akwei (3 December 1913 – ?) was a Ghanaian medical doctor. He was the first Ghanaian to be appointed Chief Medical Officer in the Gold Coast.

== Early life ==
Akwei was born on 3 December 1913. He was educated at Achimota School in Accra and at Edinburgh University.

== Professional career ==
Eustace Akwei worked as a public health physician in the Gold Coast. He was the first native to work with Dr G. T. Saunders, who was the first specialist epidemiologist and was instrumental in the control of trypanosomiasis in the country. He was a former Rockefeller Travelling Fellow and later became the first Ghanaian to be appointed Chief Medical Officer to the Ministry of Health in the Gold Coast in 1955. He was one of the prominent doctors present at the inauguration of the Ghana Medical Association in 1958. He was removed from his chief medic role in 1959 by Kwame Nkrumah, who was at the time the Prime Minister of Ghana. He subsequently joined the World Health Organization and was based in Brazzaville in the Republic of the Congo. After the coup d'état in 1966, he was reappointed Chief Medical Officer by the new National Liberation Council (NLC) military government which replaced the ruling Nkrumah government.

== Politics ==
In 1966, Akwei was appointed Commissioner for Health by the NLC military government, a position he held until the return of democratic rule in 1969.

== See also ==
- Minister for Health
- National Liberation Council

Political offices
Preceded by Osei Owusu Afriyie	Minister for Health; 1966–1969	Succeeded by Gibson Dokyi Ampaw
