= Jonathan Kwesi Lamptey =

Ghanaian politician

Member of the Ghana Parliament for Sekondi
- In office 1969–1972
- Preceded by: John Arthur
- Succeeded by: Joseph E. Arbuah

Minister for Defence
- In office 1969–1971
- Prime Minister: Kofi Abrefa Busia
- Preceded by: Lt. General Akwasi Afrifa
- Succeeded by: Bukari K. Adama (MP)

Minister for Parliamentary Affairs
- In office 1971–1972
- Prime Minister: Kofi Abrefa Busia
- Preceded by: Bukari K. Adama (MP)

Personal details
- Born: Jonathan Kwesi Lamptey; 10 May 1909 Sekondi, Gold Coast
- Education: Mfantsipim School; Exeter University; University of London

Jonathan Kwesi Lamptey (born 10 May 1909, date of death unknown) was a Ghanaian politician. He was a senior figure in the CPP who later joined the opposition, subsequently playing leading roles in the government of the second republic.

== Early life and education ==
He was born in Sekondi. He was educated locally, attending Mfantsipim School which he completed in 1931. He then proceeded to Exeter University and the University of London.

== Career ==
His career began as a science teacher at Fijai Secondary School, Sekondi. He got trained and practiced as a lawyer. He became deputy chairman of the CPP in 1950 and in 1951 he was elected into the legislative assembly of Sekondi and became junior minister of finance. Following the 1966 coup he was made Chairman of the State Gold Mining cooperation. In the Second Republic of Ghana he served as acting prime minister he also served as Minister for Defence from 1969 to 1971 and Minister for Parliamentary Affairs from 1971 to 1972 when the Busia government was overthrown by the SMC. Lamptey also served as the Leader of the House of parliament of Ghana in 1971. Following the 1972 coup he retired from active politics to continue his legal career in Sekondi.

== Politics ==
Lamptey was elected to represent the Sekondi constituency in the 1st parliament of the 2nd republic of Ghana.

=== 1969 Elections ===
He was elected on the ticket of the Progress Party. He was elected in the 1969 Ghanaian parliamentary elections.

== See also ==
- Busia government
- List of MPs elected in the 1969 Ghanaian parliamentary election
- List of MLAs elected in the 1951 Gold Coast legislative election

Political offices
Preceded by Akwasi Afrifa	Minister for Defence; 1969–1971	Succeeded by Bukari Adama
