= Adam Amandi =

Ghanaian politician

Hon. Adam Amandi

Member of the Ghana Parliament for Bawku East
- In office 1 October 1969 – 13 January 1972
- Preceded by: He was the first member of Parliament From Bawku, in 1954,1957 and 1969

Personal details
- Born: 1924
- Died: 21 February 2006 (aged 81–82)
- Party: Northern Peoples Party/ Progress Party/ New Patriotic Party
- Parent(s): Amandi Mahamma II Mambora, Naa Kugri (Zangina)
- Education: Middle Boarding School Tamale College of Education
- Occupation: Politician, Minister of State
- Profession: Educationist, Farmer and an Environmentalist

Adam Amandi (1924–2006) was an Educationist, Farmer, Environmentalist and Ghanaian politician. He was a three-time Member of Parliament (1954, 1957, 1969), and a senior member of the Busia Administration. He was a true blue, blue blooded founding member of the Northern People's Party, its various iterations—-United Party, Progress Party, Popular Front Party, and the New Patriotic Party.

== Early life and education ==
Adam Amandi was born about 1924, into the Royal Family of Bawku, Mamprugu. A town in the Upper Region of Ghana. Adam was the grandson of the 8th Bawku Naa, Naa Kugri Mahamma II Mambora (Zangina). It was during the reign of his grandfather that the Union Jack—the symbol of British Authority Overseas—was first hoisted in front of his Palace, between 1907 and 1909.

Adam, a well-known figure, was an avid reader and a history enthusiast with deep knowledge of the Moré-Dagbani ethnic group. In 1940, he attended the highest educational institution in the Northern Territories at the time, Middle Boarding School in Tamale (later Teacher Training College), where he earned a Teachers’ Training Certificate. He later obtained a Diploma (Master’s level) in English. Among his classmates were Simon Diedong Dombo, Mumuni Bawumia (his cousin and in-law), B.K. Adama, Abeifaa Karbo, Jato Kaleo, and others, who would go on to help form the Northern People’s Party.

== Politics ==
Adam was a member of the ruling Progress Party when he became member of the Parliament in October 1969. During the same time, he was also appointed minister of state between 1969 and 1972. He had earlier served in the Parliament in 1954 and 1957.

== Personal life ==
Adam was a Muslim. He was married with one wife, fourteen children and twenty three grandchildren

== Death ==
He died on 21 February 2006 after a short illness.

== See also ==
- List of MPs elected in the 1969 Ghanaian Parliamentary Elections.
