= Bukari Adama =

Ghanaian politician

Member of the Ghana Parliament for Wa
- In office 1969–1972
- Preceded by: Military government
- Succeeded by: Parliament dissolved

Member of the Ghana Parliament for Wala South
- In office 1954–1965

Minister of Parliamentary Affairs
- In office 1969–1971
- President: Kofi Abrefa Busia
- Succeeded by: J. Kwesi Lamptey

Minister of Defence
- In office 1971–1972
- President: Kofi Abrefa Busia
- Preceded by: J. Kwesi Lamptey

Personal details
- Born: 15 November 1925 Busa, Wa, Gold Coast
- Died: 2 November 2003 (aged 77) Accra, Ghana
- Citizenship: Ghana
- Spouse: Memuna Mansara Braimah
- Education: Wa Native Authority Primary Boarding School Tamale Government Middle Boarding School Tamale Government Training College

Bukari Kpegla Adama (15 November 1925 – 2 November 2003) was a Ghanaian politician and a minister of state in the Second Republic.

== Early life and education ==
Born at Busa in the Wa district on 15 November 1925, he attended Wa Native Authority Primary Boarding School in 1934, completing in 1939; and Tamale Government Middle Boarding School, Tamale from 1940 to 1943. He proceeded to the Tamale Government Training College, Tamale and subsequently left in 1944 to join the Medical Field Unit (M.F.U.) as a technician specialising in yaws and typhoid. He resigned in that same year to go into active politics.

== Politics ==
He stood for the seat of Wala South constituency in the Legislative Assembly and won on the Northern Peoples Party (NPP) ticket in June 1954. He was in the opposition and remained the "Chief Whip" in Parliament until 1965 when Ghana became a one party state. He was not re-elected, because he refused to join the party in power.

In 1957, when the Avoidance of Discrimination act was passed he played a leading role in the merger between the Northern People's Party (NPP) and the National Liberation Movement (NLM) that formed the United Party (UP) as an executive member of the Northern People's Party (NPP).

In May 1957, he went to the United Kingdom to do a course in Parliamentary Practice in Westminster, London. In October 1960 he was a member of the "Ghana delegation" to the Nigerian Independence celebrations. In 1965 he went into voluntary exile for four months before the 1966 coup in February. He returned to Ghana after the 1966 coup d'état, and in December 1968 he was elected to the constituent assembly for the Wa Administrative District.

In 1969, he was elected as a parliamentary member representing Wala South, he served in this capacity until 1972. He was appointed Minister of Parliamentary Affairs in 1969 and later Defence Minister in 1971 serving in the Busia Administration until Colonel Acheampong's coup d'état of 13 January 1972. In 1979, during the inception of the Third Republic he contributed to deliberations that led to the formation of the Popular Front Party (PFP) and also the New Patriotic Party (NPP) in 1993.

== Personal life ==
He married Memuna Mansara Braimah in 1949, and Mansara al Hassan in 1963. He was a Muslim.

== Death ==
He died on Sunday, 2 November 2003, at the 37 Military Hospital after a short illness.

== See also ==
- Busia government
- List of MPs elected in the 1969 Ghanaian parliamentary election

Political offices
Preceded by J. K. Lamptey	Minister for Defence; 1971–1972	Succeeded by I. K. Acheampong
