= Leklebi =

- Country: Ghana
- Region: Volta Region

Leklebi is a town in the Volta Region of Ghana. The town is known for the Leklebi Secondary School. The school is a second cycle institution.
