= Yusif Sulemana =

Ghanaian politician (born 1972)

Hon Yusif Sulemana
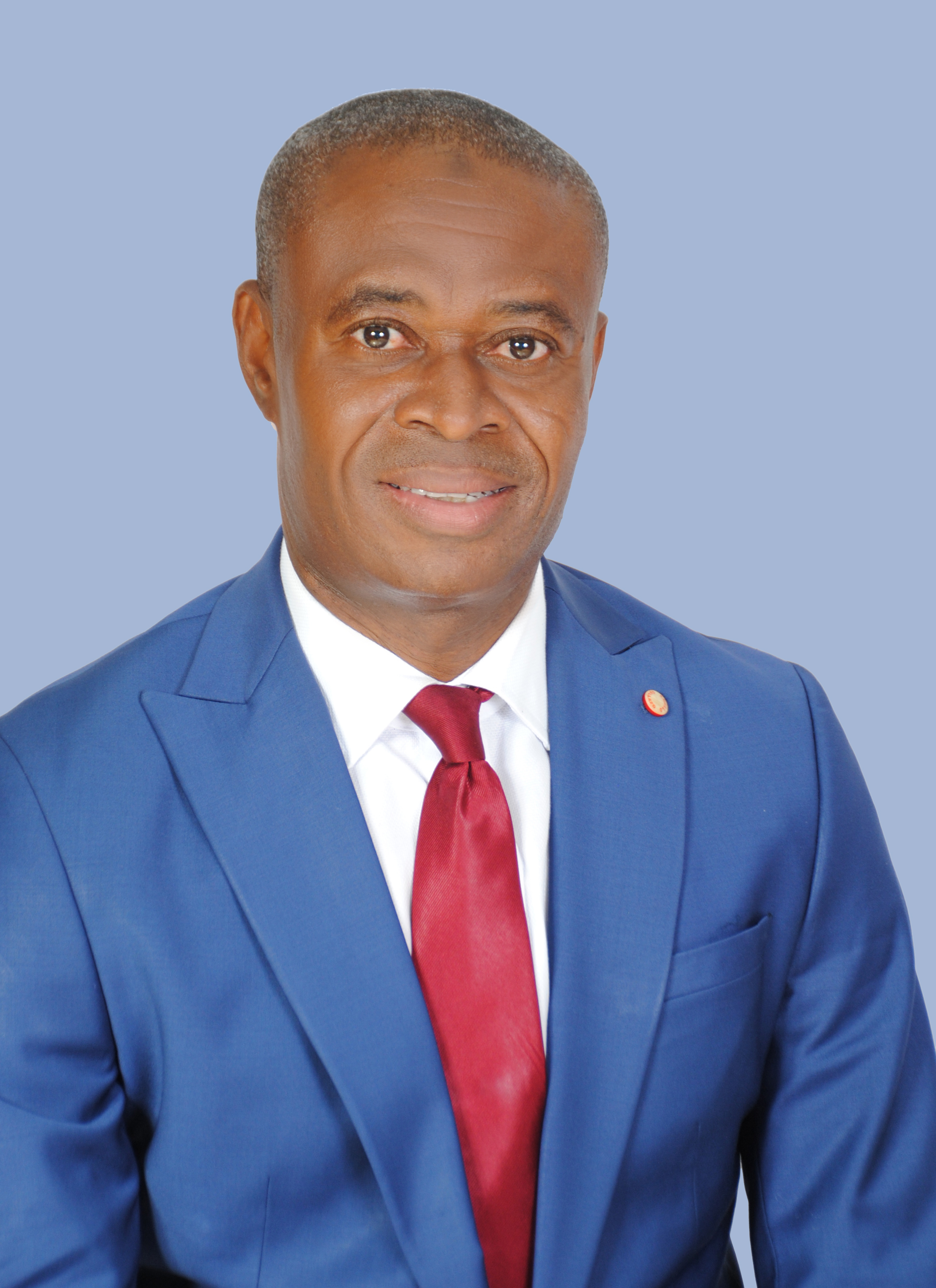

Member of the Ghana Parliament for Bole
- Incumbent
- Assumed office 7 January 2017

Deputy Minister for Lands and Natural Resources
- President: H.E John Dramani Mahama
- Preceded by: Hon. Akwasi Konadu; George Mireku Duker

Personal details
- Born: Yusif Sulemana; 29 July 1972 (age 54) Bole, Ghana
- Party: National Democratic Congress
- Education: University of Ghana
- Occupation: Politician
- Committees: Trade, Industry and Tourism Committee, Public Accounts Committee

Yusif Sulemana (born 29 July 1972) is a Ghanaian politician and member of the Seventh Parliament of the Fourth Republic of Ghana representing the Bole in the Northern Region on the ticket of the National Democratic Congress. He was born in Ghana.

== Early life and education ==
Sulemana hails from Bole. He holds a certificate in Monitoring and Evaluation from GIMPA and a B.S.C and an E.M.B.A from the University of Ghana.

== Personal life ==
Yusif Sulemana is a Muslim.

== Politics ==
Sulemana is a member of the National Democratic Congress (NDC) and represented the Bole Bamboi constituency in the Savanna Region in the Seventh and Eighth Parliament of the Fourth Republic of Ghana.

=== 2016 election ===
Sulemana contested the Bole Bamboi parliamentary seat on the ticket of the National Democratic Congress during the 2016 Ghanaian general election and won with 17,326 votes representing 73.85% of the total votes. He was elected over Alele Veronica Heming of the New Patriotic Party who polled 5,711 votes which is equivalent to 24.34%, parliamentary candidate for the PPP Akwesi Osman Daniel had 284 votes representing 1.21% and the parliamentary candidate for the Convention People's Party Issahaku Siiba had 141 votes representing 0.60% of the total votes.

==== 2020 election ====
Sulemana was re-elected as a member of parliament for Bole constituency on the ticket of the National Democratic Congress during the 2020 Ghanaian general election and won with 26,350 votes out of 38,935 total valid votes representing 67.68% over David Sei Damah of the New Patriotic Party who had 12,585 votes, representing 32.32% of the total valid votes.

=== Committees ===
Sulemana is a member of Trade Industry and Tourism committee and Public Accounts committee.
