= Emmanuel Humphrey Tettey Korboe =

Ghanaian politician

Regional Commissioner for Central Region
- In office 1965–1966
- President: Dr. Kwame Nkrumah
- Preceded by: Joseph Essilfie Hagan
- Succeeded by: R. J. G. Dontoh

Regional Commissioner for Eastern Region
- In office 1960–1965
- President: Dr. Kwame Nkrumah
- Preceded by: New
- Succeeded by: Joseph Essilfie Hagan

Member of Parliament for Somanya
- In office 1965 – February 1966
- Preceded by: New

Member of Parliament for Yilo-Krobo
- In office 1954–1965
- Succeeded by: Constituency abolished

Personal details
- Born: Emmanuel Humphrey Tettey Korboe; 1912 Gold Coast
- Citizenship: Ghanaian
- Education: O'Reilly Senior High School

Emmanuel Humphrey Tettey Korboe was a Ghanaian politician in the first republic. He served as a regional commissioner for the Eastern Region and later for the Central Region. He also served as a member of parliament for the Yilo-Krobo constituency and later the Somanya constituency.

== Early life and education ==
Korboe was born in 1912. He had his early education at Accra Royal School and continued at the O'Reilley Educational Institute.

== Career and politics ==
Korboe begun as a clerk to the Abdala Transport Company in 1932. He later became a farmer and a cocoa broker. He was chairman of the Yilo Krobo Local Council, chairman of the Somanya branch of the Convention People's Party (CPP) and chairman of the Volta River District CPP Constituency Council. In 1954 he was elected to represent the Yilo Krobo constituency in the National Assembly. He was appointed Regional Commissioner (Regional Minister) for the Eastern Region in 1957. He held this political position from 1957 to 1965. In 1965 he was appointed Regional Commissioner for the Central Region. He served in this capacity until February 1966 when the Nkrumah government was overthrown.
