= Joseph Akati Saaka =

Ghanaian politician

Joseph Akati Saaka (born November 17, 1950) is a Ghanaian politician and member of the National Democratic Congress. He was a member of the 5th and 6th Parliament of the 4th Republic of Ghana representing Bole Constituency.

== Personal life and early career ==
A member of the Gonja ethnic group, Saaka was born in Bole on November 17, 1950.

After obtaining his Master of Business Administration (Marketing) from the University of Miami, Florida, USA, 1986, he started his career as a marketing expert and was employed as a sales and marketing manager at Dupaul Wood Treatment Company Limited. Committee on Poverty Reduction Strategy, Health. He is a Muslim and married with seven children.

== Political career ==
Became a Member of Parliament for Bole Constituency in January 2009. He won 11,452 votes or 64.78% in 2008 for the Bole Bamboi constituency. He began his political career that year after being elected to represent his constituency in the 5th parliament. He succeeded John Dramani Mahama who ran alongside John Atta Mills for presidency that year and won.
