= Imoru Salifu =

Ghanaian politician

Imoru Salifu was a Ghanaian politician and founding member of the Northern People's Party.
