= Anthony Woode =

Ghanaian trade unionist

Anthony Kobina Woode was born on 1 February 1923. A trade unionist, he actively participated in the movement for independence in the Gold Coast, later to become Ghana.

== Political activity ==
Woode met Kwame Nkrumah when Nkrumah arrived in the Gold Coast from Britain in December 1948 to take up the role of General Secretary of the United Gold Coast Convention. Political differences began to emerge within the convention, leading to younger members breaking away to form the Convention People's Party (CPP) in June 1949. Nkrumah became the chairman, Komla Agbeli Gbedemah the vice-chairman, and Kojo Botsio secretary of the CPP. Woode joined the Sekondi branch of the CPP. He was elected General Secretary of the Trades Union Congress (TUC) in August 1949, aged just 23. Pobee Biney, who became a close friend and associate of Woode, was elected Vice-President and together they forged the radical nationalist tendency, along with several others, in both the TUC and CPP. Woode helped negotiate with the miners' union.

Woode threatened to call a general strike in November 1949 after 60 meteorological workers were dismissed for striking illegally in October. As General Secretary of the TUC, he threatened to order all workers to down tools and participate in a general strike.

Together with Kwame Nkrumah and others, Woode played a leading role in organising a Positive Action campaign, which consisted of mass peaceful protests aimed at pressurising the British colonial government into granting immediate self-government to the people of the Gold Coast colony.

The TUC declared a general strike at midnight on 6 January 1950, triggering Nkrumah to announce the start of Positive Action at a mass rally just over a day later on 8 January. Woode, Nkrumah and others were eventually arrested and imprisoned, with Nkrumah only being released when the CPP overwhelmingly won the general election held in February 1951.

== Arrest and imprisonment ==
On 9 February 1950, a case against Woode was brought before the Magistrate's Court in Sekondi. The charges against him included inciting people to participate in an illegal strike and committing an act prejudicial to public safety. He was sentenced on 18 February to one year in prison.

== Impact of Positive Action ==
Fallout from the Positive Action campaign led to the demise of the Gold Coast TUC and its eventual split from the CPP as Woode, who along with his colleague Pobee Biney represented the more radical wing of the Gold Coast TUC, were ousted from their leadership positions. This led to a split in the TUC in 1951 when the Ghana Federation Trade Union Congress (GFTUC) was formed. Though they did not have official leadership positions, Biney and Woode aligned themselves with the GFTUC.

In the 1951 Gold Coast general election, Woode was elected as a CPP member of the Legislative Assembly for the Sefwi-Wiawso constituency in the western region. After taking his seat, he became increasingly more critical of the CPP for sidelining workers' interests.

Woode attended the Communist World Federation of Trade Unions. Alongside his union activities, this put him on the Central Intelligence Agency (CIA) watchlist. A 1955 CIA file cites that Woode was making plans to organise a National Peace Movement.

In October 1953, apparently under pressure from the British colonial power, Woode and his colleague Turkson Ocran were suspended from the CPP for attending the World Federation of Trade Unions.

In 1956, on the eve of independence, Woode was prevented from standing for the CPP in the general election. The seat he had held as a CPP Legislative Assembly member was contested by William Kwabena Aduhene who was elected as the Member of Parliament for Sefwi-Wiawso.

The leadership of the CPP felt that the chances of attaining independence would be compromised by those on the left wing of the party.
