= Joseph Essilfie Hagan =

Ghanaian politician

Joseph Esilifie Hagan

Regional Commissioner for the Eastern Region
- In office June 1965 – February 1966
- President: Kwame Nkrumah
- Preceded by: Emmanuel Humphrey Tettey Korboe
- Succeeded by: G. A. K. Dzansi

Regional Commissioner for the Central Region
- In office October 1960 – 1965
- President: Dr. Kwame Nkrumah
- Preceded by: New
- Succeeded by: Emmanuel Humphrey Tettey Korboe

Regional Commissioner for the Western Region
- In office 1957–1960
- President: Dr. Kwame Nkrumah
- Preceded by: New
- Succeeded by: John Arthur

Member of Parliament for Abura
- In office 1965 – February 1966
- Preceded by: New
- Succeeded by: Dr. John Kofi Fynn

Member of Parliament for Abura-Asebu
- In office 1951–1965
- Succeeded by: Constituency split

Personal details
- Born: Joseph Esilifie Hagan; 1912 Gold Coast
- Citizenship: Ghanaian
- Education: Adisadel College

Joseph Esilifie Hagan was a Ghanaian politician. He served as a regional commissioner for the Western Region, the Central Region and the Eastern Region. He also served as a member of parliament for the Abura-Asebu constituency and later the Abura constituency.

== Early life and education ==
Hagan was born in 1912. He had his early education at Nyakrom Methodist School and continued at St. Nicholas Grammar School (now Adisadel College), Cape Coast.

== Career and politics ==
After his secondary school education, Hagan was employed as a storekeeper by the Union Trading Company (U.T.C.) from 1937 to 1950. Hagan joined the Cape Coast Town Council and became a foundation member of the Convention People's Party in 1949. In 1951 he was elected as a member of the Legislative Assembly, where he was the Assistant Government Whip. He was re-elected in 1954 and in 1956. That same year (1956), he was appointed ministerial secretary (deputy minister) to the Ministry of Local Government. In 1957, he was appointed Regional Commissioner (Regional Minister) for the Western Region he served in that capacity until 1960 when he was appointed Regional Commissioner for the Central Region. In 1965 he was appointed Regional Commissioner for the Eastern Region he remained in this position until 1966 when the Nkrumah government was overthrown.
