= Joseph Kodzo =

Ghanaian teacher and politician

Regional Commissioner for the Volta Region
- In office June 1965 – February 1966
- President: Kwame Nkrumah
- Preceded by: Hans Kofi Boni
- Succeeded by: E. Q. Q. Sanniez

Minister for Health
- In office December 1964 – June 1965
- President: Kwame Nkrumah
- Preceded by: Lawrence Rosario Abavana
- Succeeded by: Osei Owusu Afriyie

Member of Parliament for Krachi
- In office 1965 – February 1966
- Preceded by: New
- Succeeded by: Benard Kwaku Mensah

Member of Parliament for Akan-Krachi
- In office 1954–1965
- Preceded by: New
- Succeeded by: Constituency abolished

Member of Parliament for Buem-Krachi
- In office 1951–1954
- Preceded by: New
- Succeeded by: Constituency abolished

Personal details
- Born: Joseph Kodzo; 1916 Kete-Krachi, Volta Region
- Citizenship: Ghanaian
- Education: St. Augustine's College

Joseph Kodzo was a Ghanaian educationist and politician. He was a Minister of state and a member of parliament during the first republic. He served as the Minister for Health from 1964 to 1965 and the Regional Commissioner (now Regional Minister) for the Volta Region from 1965. He was also the member of parliament for the Buem-Krachi constituency from 1951 to 1954, the member of parliament for the Akan-Krachi constituency from 1954 to 1965 and the member of parliament for the Krachi constituency from 1965 to 1966.

== Early life and education ==
Kodzo was born in 1916 at Kete-Krachi, a town then Volta Region of Ghana (now in Oti Region), to Kodzo Emfrinne and Afua Kra. His early education begun at the Kete-Krachi Roman Catholic Primary School and the Roman Catholic Middle School in Kpando from 1925 to 1934. He continued at the St. Augustine's Training College (now St. Augustine's College, Cape Coast) in 1935 to train as a teacher. There he obtained his Teachers' Certificate 'A' in 1938.

== Career ==
After training as a teacher, Kodzo returned to the Volta Region where he held teaching appointments for a period of 14 years. He resigned from the teaching profession in 1951 as the headmaster of the Roman Catholic Middle School in Kete-Krachi.

Kodzo entered parliament in 1951 after winning the Buem-Krachi seat during the 1951 Gold Coast Legislative Election, which occurred on 8 February 1951. In 1954, he was re-elected into parliament, this time, representing the Akan Krachi constituency from 1954 until 1965. While in parliament he was appointed Parliamentary Secretary to the Ministry of Trade in November 1957. The portfolio was later changed to Deputy Minister, and in 1959, he was made Deputy Minister of Health. After about four years in this appointment, Kodzo was elevated to the post of Minister for Health in December 1964. After working in that capacity for some months, he was made the Volta Regional Commissioner. He remained in this appointment until the overthrow of the Nkrumah government on 24 February 1966.

In 1969, Kodzo together with Hans Kofi Boni were sentenced to six years each imprisonment by the Accra High Court presided over by Justice Edward Kwame Wiredu. They were found guilty of inappropriate disbursement of funds of the then Industrial Development Corporation (IDC).

== Personal life ==
Kodzo married Mrs. Monica Akosua Kodzo in 1940. Together, they had four children.
