= John Mahama =

President of Ghana (2012–2017; since 2025)

- Mahama in 2026

12th & 14th President of Ghana
- Incumbent
- Assumed office 7 January 2025
- Vice President: Jane Naana Opoku-Agyemang
- Preceded by: Nana Akufo-Addo
- In office 24 July 2012 – 7 January 2017
- Vice President: Kwesi Amissah-Arthur
- Preceded by: John Atta Mills
- Succeeded by: Nana Akufo-Addo

Second Vice Chairperson of the African Union
- Incumbent
- Assumed office 15 February 2025
- President: João Lourenço

5th Vice President of Ghana
- In office 7 January 2009 – 24 July 2012
- President: John Atta Mills
- Preceded by: Aliu Mahama
- Succeeded by: Kwesi Amissah-Arthur

Minister for Communications
- In office November 1998 – 7 January 2001
- President: Jerry Rawlings
- Preceded by: Ekwow Spio-Garbrah
- Succeeded by: Felix Owusu-Adjapong

Deputy Minister for Communications
- In office April 1997 – November 1998
- President: Jerry Rawlings

Member of Parliament for Bole
- In office 7 January 1997 – 7 January 2009
- Preceded by: Mahama Jeduah
- Succeeded by: Joseph Akati Saaka

Chair of the Economic Community of West African States
- In office 17 February 2013 – 19 May 2015
- Preceded by: Alassane Ouattara
- Succeeded by: Macky Sall

Personal details
- Born: John Dramani Mahama; 29 November 1958 (age 67) Damongo, Dominion of Ghana
- Party: National Democratic Congress
- Spouse: Lordina Effah (m. 1992)
- Relations: Emmanuel Adama Mahama (father); Ibrahim (brother)
- Children: 4; including Sharaf
- Education: University of Ghana; Moscow Institute of Social Sciences
- Website: Official website

John Dramani Mahama (/məˈhɑːmə/; born 29 November 1958) is a Ghanaian politician who has been the president of the Republic of Ghana since January 2025. A member of the National Democratic Congress (NDC), he previously served as president from 2012 to 2017.

Mahama served as a Member of Parliament for Bole/Bamboi from 1997 to 2009 and served as Deputy Minister for Communication between 1997 and 1998 before becoming the substantive Minister for Communications in 1998. He then served as vice president under President John Atta Mills from 2009 to 2012. Mahama took office as president when Mills died in office on 24 July 2012. Mahama is the first vice president to assume the presidency following the death of his predecessor, and is the first head of state of Ghana to have been born after Ghana's independence in 1957.

He was elected in the December 2012 election to serve a full-term as president. He contested re-election for a second term in the 2016 election but lost to the New Patriotic Party candidate Nana Akufo-Addo. This made him the first president in the history of Ghana to not have won a consecutive second term. Mahama was again the NDC's presidential candidate in the 2020 election, where he lost to Akufo-Addo.

He was re-elected president in the 2024 election, defeating the then incumbent vice president Mahamudu Bawumia, making him the first president in Ghanaian history to be democratically elected to a non-consecutive second term.

== Early years ==
A member of the Gonja ethnic group, Mahama hails from Bole in the Savannah Region of Ghana. He was born on 29 November 1958 in Damongo, an area in the present-day West Gonja District of the Northern Region. His father, Emmanuel Adama Mahama, a wealthy rice farmer and teacher, was the first Member of Parliament for the West Gonja constituency and the first Regional Commissioner of the Northern Region during the First Republic under Ghana's first president, Kwame Nkrumah. Mahama's father also served as a senior presidential advisor during Ghana's Third Republic under Hilla Limann who was overthrown in 1981 by Jerry John Rawlings.

== Education ==
Mahama had his primary education at the Accra Newtown Experimental School (ANT1) before going to boarding school at the Achimota Primary School. He completed secondary school, at Ghana Secondary School, in Tamale a school in the Northern Region of Ghana. He proceeded to the University of Ghana, Legon, receiving a bachelor's degree in history in 1981 and a postgraduate diploma in communication studies in 1986. As a student, he was a member of Commonwealth Hall Legon. He also studied at the Institute of Social Sciences in Moscow in the Soviet Union, specializing in social psychology; he obtained a postgraduate degree in 1988.

== Early career ==
After completing his undergraduate education, Mahama became a secondary school teacher for a few years. Upon his return to Ghana after studying in Moscow, he worked as the Information, Culture and Research Officer at the Embassy of Japan in Accra between 1991 and 1995. From there he moved to the anti-poverty non-governmental organisation (NGO) Plan International's Ghana Country Office, where he worked as International Relations, Sponsorship Communications and Grants Manager between 1995 and 1996. In 1993, he participated in a professional training course for Overseas Public Relations Staff, organized by the Japanese Ministry of Foreign Affairs in Tokyo. He also participated in a management development course organized by Plan International (RESA) in Nairobi, Kenya.

=== As Member of Parliament ===
Mahama was first elected to the Parliament of Ghana in the 1996 elections to represent the Bole/Bamboi Constituency for a four-year term. In April 1997, Mahama was appointed Deputy Minister of Communications. He was promoted to the post of Minister of Communications in November 1998, serving in that post until January 2001, when the ruling National Democratic Congress (NDC) handed over power to the New Patriotic Party government.

In 2000, Mahama was re-elected for another four-year term as the Member of Parliament for Bole/Bamboi Constituency. He was again re-elected in 2004 for a third term. From 2001 to 2004, Mahama served as the Minority Parliamentary Spokesman for Communications. In 2002, he was appointed the Director of Communications for the NDC. That same year, he served as a member of the team of International Observers selected to monitor Zimbabwe's Parliamentary Elections. As an MP, he was a member of Standing Orders Committee as well as the Transport, Industry, Energy, Communications, Science and Technology Committee of Parliament.

== As Minister and Vice Presidency (1997–2012) ==
Mahama served as the Deputy Minister of Communications between April 1997 and November 1998. During his tenure as Minister for Communications, Mahama also served as the Chairman of the National Communications Authority, in which capacity he played a key role in stabilising Ghana's telecommunications sector after it was deregulated in 1997. As a minister, he was a founding member of the Ghana AIDS Commission, a member of the implementation committee of the 2000 National Population Census and a deputy chairman of the Publicity Committee for the re-introduction of the Value Added Tax (VAT).

In 2003, Mahama became a member of the Pan-African Parliament, serving as the Chairperson of the West African Caucus until 2011. He was also a member of European and Pan African Parliaments' Ad hoc Committee on Cooperation. In 2005, Mahama became the Minority Spokesperson for Foreign Affairs. He is a member of the UNDP Advisory Committee on Conflict Resolution in Ghana.

On 7 January 2009, Mahama was sworn into office as the Vice-President of Ghana with John Atta Mills as President. He also served as the Chairman of the National Economic Management Team, the Armed Forces Council of Ghana, the Decentralisation and Implementation Committee and the Police Council of Ghana in this capacity.

== First presidency (2012–2017) ==
In line with Ghana's constitution, Mahama became president on 24 July 2012 on the death of his predecessor, John Atta Mills. In July 2012, he became Ghana's first president to have served at all levels of political office (Ghanaian and Pan-African MP, Deputy Minister, Minister, vice-president and President). He said in parliament upon being sworn in:

This is the saddest day in our nation's history. Tears have engulfed our nation and we are deeply saddened and distraught and I'm personally devastated, I've lost a father, I've lost a friend, I've lost a mentor and a senior comrade. Ghana is united in grief at this time for our departed president.

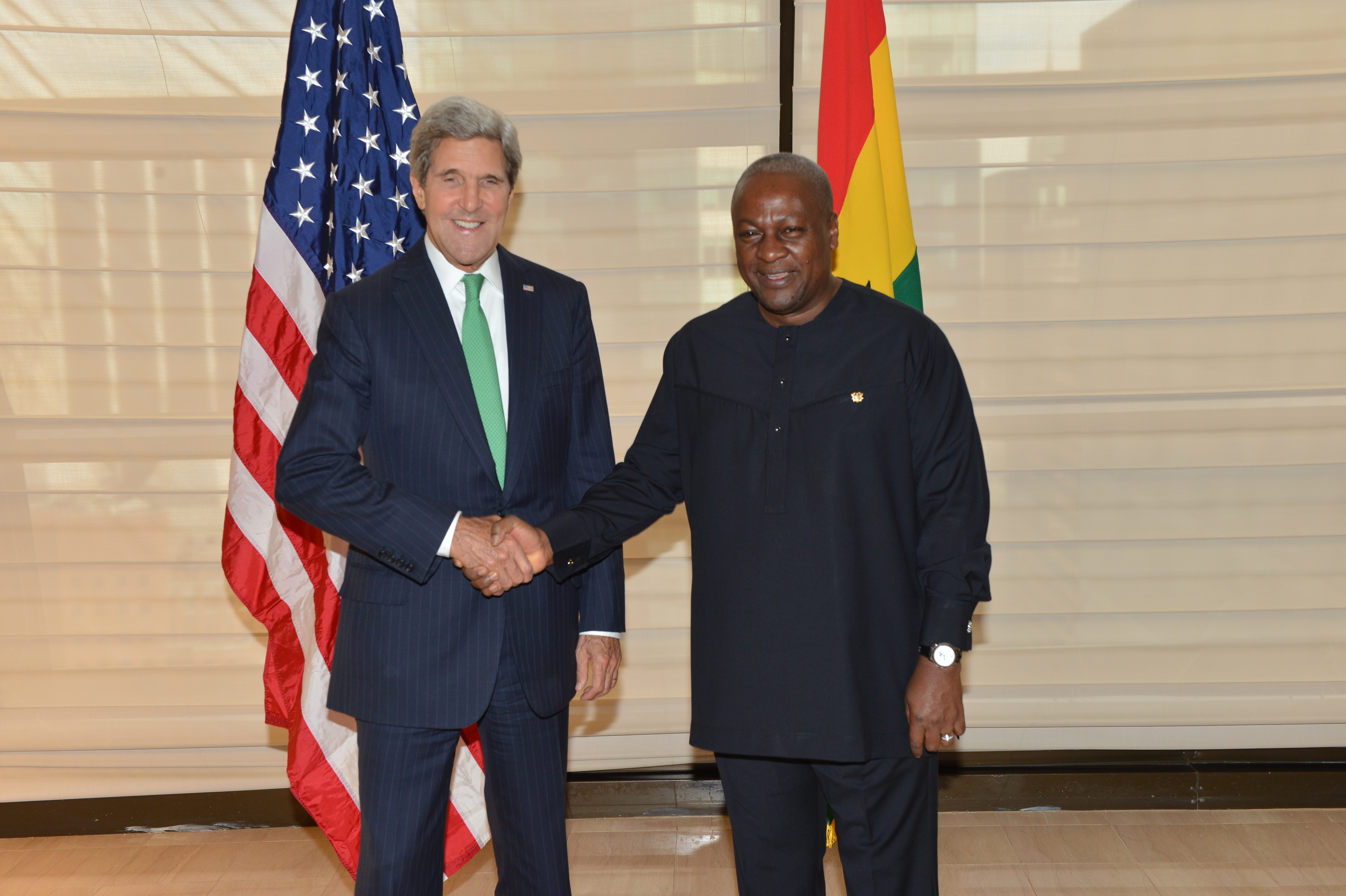
John Mahama holds a bilateral meeting with the then-United States Secretary of State John Kerry.

As a result of his elevation to the presidency, Mahama made political history by becoming the first Ghanaian head of state to have been born after Ghana's declaration of independence on 6 March 1957. The NDC held a Special National Delegates Congress on 30 August 2012 and endorsed Mahama as its 2012 presidential candidate. Mahama, the sole candidate of the party, polled 2,767 votes, representing 99.5% of total votes cast, to pick the slot for the party. Mahama had stated that his administration was deeply committed to continuing the Better Ghana Agenda started under President Mills.

Mahama won the December 2012 general election with 50.70% of the total valid votes cast and a 3% winning margin beating his nearest rival, Nana Akufo-Addo of the main opposition New Patriotic Party, who polled a close 47.74%. This was just barely enough to win the presidency without the need for a runoff. In addition, Mahama won the majority of valid votes cast in eight out of Ghana's ten administrative regions. Thirteen African Heads of State, one Prime Minister, two vice-presidents and 18 government delegations across the world attended his inaugural ceremony at the Black Star Square in Accra on 7 January 2013, when Mahama was sworn in to begin his own four-year term.

After his investiture, the opposition New Patriotic Party led by Nana Akufo-Addo, his running mate, Mahamudu Bawumia and the party chairman, Jacob Otanka Obetsebi-Lamptey, challenged the election results, alleging irregularities, malpractices, omissions and violations. The petition was heard by nine justices of the Supreme Court of Ghana. After eight months of hearing, the Court on 29 August 2013, dismissed the petition by a majority opinion.

Mahama is one of Africa's most-followed leaders on the social networking sites, Twitter and Facebook. In May 2013, he stated that all of West Africa is under the threat of Islamist militancy.

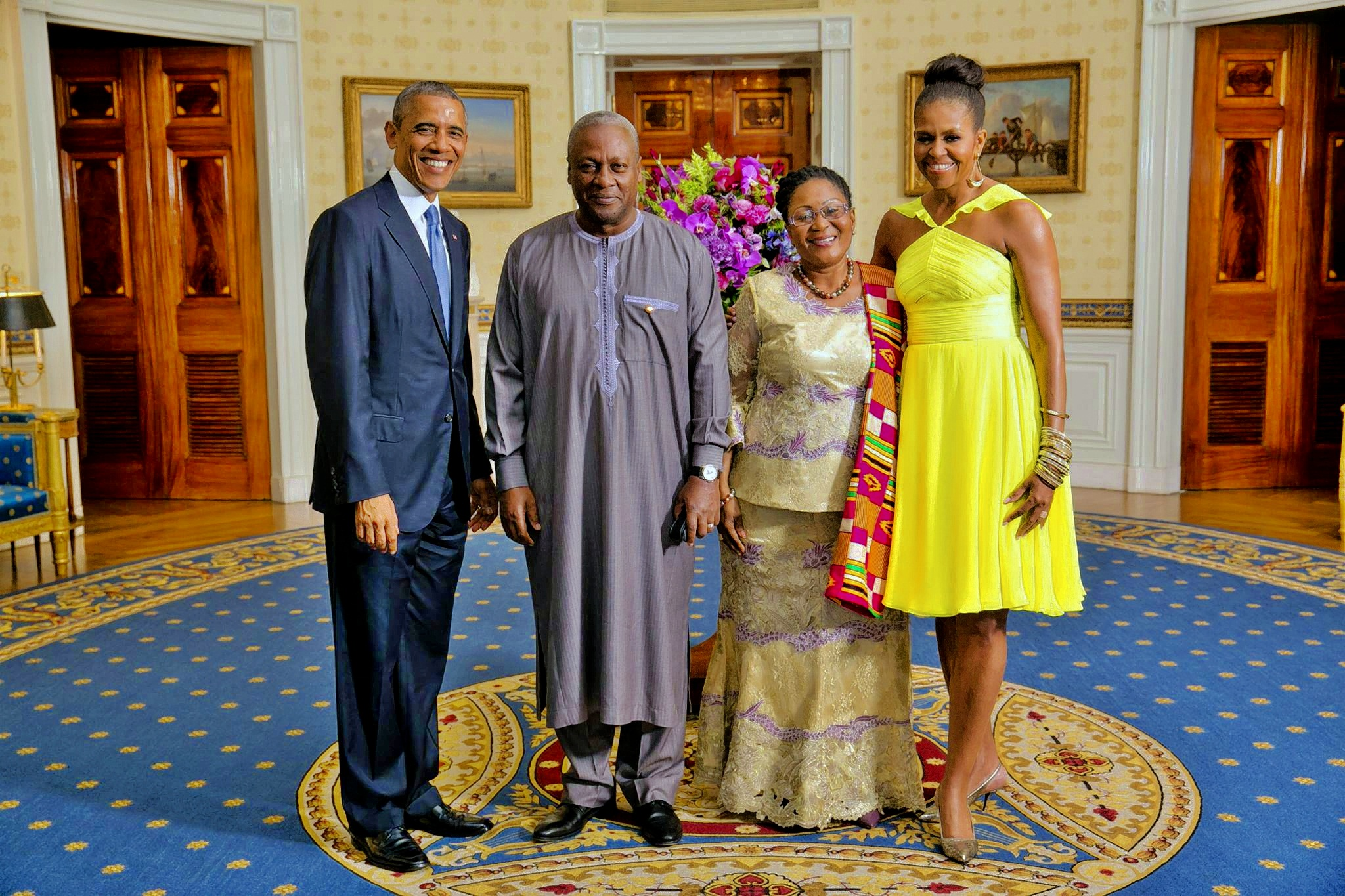
Then-U.S. President Barack Obama and First Lady Michelle greet Mahama and First Lady Lordina Mahama, in the Blue Room during a U.S.-Africa Leaders Summit at the White House, 5 August 2014.

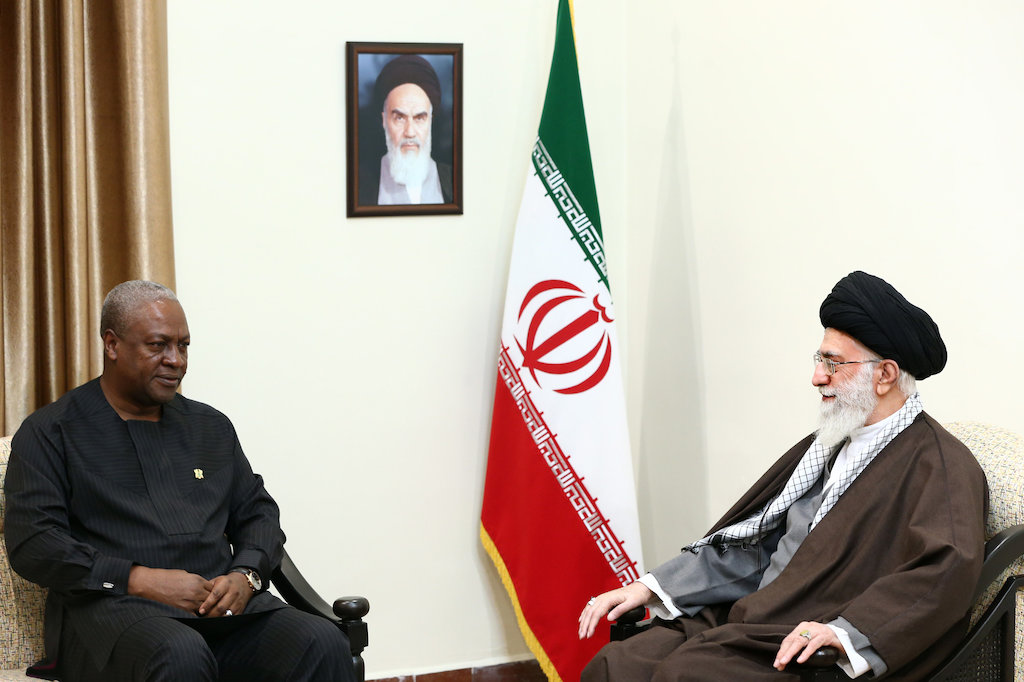
Mahama with Iran's Supreme Leader Ayatollah Ali Khamenei in Tehran, Iran, 14 February 2016

On 30 March 2014, he was elected to preside over ECOWAS. On 26 June 2014, he was elected Chairperson of the African Union's (AU's) High-Level African Trade Committee (HATC).

On 21 January 2016, on the occasion of the World Economic Forum in Davos, Mahama became co-chair of the Sustainable Development Goals Advocates group which consists of 17 eminent persons assisting the UN Secretary-General in the campaign to achieve the Sustainable Development Goals (SDGs) that world leaders unanimously adopted in September 2015. With a mandate to support the Secretary-General in his efforts to generate momentum and commitment to achieve the SDGs by 2030, the SDG Advocates have been working to promote the universal sustainable development agenda, to raise awareness of the integrated nature of the SDGs, and to foster the engagement of new stakeholders in the implementation of these Goals.

Mahama sought a second full term at the December 2016 general election. He was eligible for a second full term since he ascended to the presidency with only six months remaining in Mills' term. In Ghana, a vice president who ascends to the presidency is allowed to run for two full terms in his own right if more than half of his predecessor's term has expired. He was defeated by main opposition leader Akufo-Addo in a rematch from four years earlier, and conceded defeat on election night. Mahama polled 44.4% of the valid votes cast compared to Akufo-Addo's 53.5%.

In December 2016, he was part of the ECOWAS mediation team to resolve the post-election political impasse in The Gambia between the defeated incumbent president, Yahya Jammeh and declared winner, Adama Barrow.

Controversy

In 2016 John Mahama faced accusations of bribery and corruption after an investigative journalist Manasseh Azure Awuni detailed the reception of a Ford Expedition valued at $100,000 from Burkinabe contractor Djibril Kanazoe.

An investigation by the Ghanaian Commission on Human Rights and Administrative Justice (CHRAJ) concluded that President John Dramani Mahama contravened the nation's gift policy with regard to his decision to accept the Ford vehicle from the contractor. The commission concluded that the gift did not amount to bribery, conflict of interest or fraud as President Mahama subsequently surrendered the vehicle to the State.

== Between terms (2017–2025) ==
=== 2020 presidential bid ===
In February 2019, Mahama was confirmed as the candidate of the opposition NDC to contest in the 2020 elections, against incumbent president Nana Akufo-Addo, who unseated Mahama in 2016, capitalizing on an economy that was slowing due to falling prices for gold, oil and cocoa exports. He won the NDC primaries by securing an overwhelming 213,487 votes, representing 95.23 percent of the total valid votes cast with the other six contenders managing with about 4 percent of the votes.

On 4 December 2020, Mahama and Akufo-Addo, who he faced both in the 2012 and 2016 Ghanaian presidential elections, signed a peace pact to ensure peace before, during, and after the 7 December elections. Akufo-Addo won the election with 51.6% of the vote.

In August 2021, Mahama began a tour dubbed "Thank You Tour" in Ghana to thank Ghanaians for voting in the 2020 election. He visited Upper West, Upper East, North East, Northern and Savannah Regions in the first phase where he met chiefs, queens, religious leaders and also interacted with the media.

=== 2024 presidential bid ===
On 14 May 2023, Mahama won and was confirmed during the NDC presidential primary as the party's presidential candidate in the 2024 General elections. He polled 297,603 votes representing 98.9% and his closest contender, former Kumasi Mayor Kojo Bonsu, polled 3,181 representing 1.1%. A third contestant, Kwabena Duffuor, a former Finance minister, pulled out of the race on the eve of the elections on 12 May 2023, making it a two-way race between Mahama and Bonsu.

On 8 December 2024, the candidate of the New Patriotic Party and Vice President Mahamudu Bawumia called John Mahama and conceded defeat in the 2024 General Elections.

== Second presidency (2025–present) ==
Mahama with Russian President Vladimir Putin at the 2026 Russia–Africa Summit in Moscow, 28 October 2026

Mahama was inaugurated for his second term as president on 7 January 2025. He will have to leave office for good in 2029; the Ghanaian constitution limits a president to two terms, whether successive or separated.

In one of his first acts as president, he announced an investigation into the National Cathedral of Ghana project approved under his predecessor Nana Akufo-Addo amid criticism over its costs.

On 10 February 2025, Mahama ordered a ban on non-essential travel by government officials and said that authorised travels must be done in a modest manner.

On 22 April 2025, Mahama ordered the suspension of Chief Justice Gertrude Torkornoo, citing a preliminary investigation that found sufficient grounds for an inquiry into her conduct. He ordered her dismissal on 1 September 2025 following a recommendation by an investigative committee.

On 10 June 2025, Mahama joined the Board of the Global Center on Adaptation.

== Personal life and interests ==
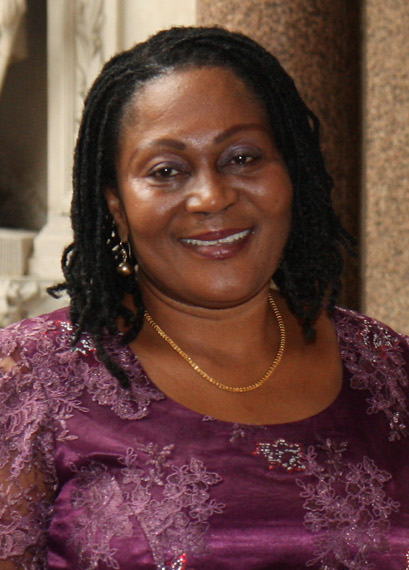
Ghanaian First Lady Lordina Mahama on 3 June 2014.

Mahama is married to Lordina Mahama (née Effah, 6 March 1963). They have five children: Farida, Jesse, Shafik, Shahid and Sharaf, who formerly played for Rostocker FC as a striker.

Mahama is a Christian, born and raised a Presbyterian but is now a member of the Assemblies of God, Ghana by marriage. His family is multi-faith, consisting of Christians and Muslims. Being a staunch campaigner for sustainability, he has a keen interest in environmental affairs, particularly the problem of single-use plastic waste pollution in Africa, which he committed himself to addressing during his tenure as vice president.

Over the course of his career, Mahama has written for several newspapers and other publications both locally and internationally. As an MP, he wrote Mahama's Hammer, a semi-regular column in a Ghanaian newspaper. His essays have also been published in the Daily Graphic, Ebony, Huffington Post, the Louisville Courier-Journal, the New York Times and The Root. Additionally, he was a featured speaker at the TEDx Great Pacific Garbage Patch Conference in Santa Monica. Mahama is also a devotee of Afrobeat music, especially that of Fela Kuti. Apart from reading, Mahama also has a strong interest in innovation particularly the use of technology in agriculture being a farmer himself. In particular, he is interested in finding the most effective ways to improve agricultural productivity and works to encourage more young people to see farming as a viable business and not a subsistence activity. This has translated into his passion to see the Savanna Accelerated Development Authority (SADA) create new opportunities for people living in the Savanna areas of the country, which includes the three Northern Regions, and the Volta Region. Even on official assignments outside of country, Mahama likes to take advantage of opportunities to visit agricultural establishments and update himself on current trends and developments. He also takes keen interest in the opportunities for simplifying and making tasks easier with the use of information and communications technology, and considers the ICT industry one of the sectors that can play a significant role in economic transformation and job creation. Mahama is the elder brother of businessman Ibrahim Mahama who owns Dzata Cement.

=== Books ===
Mahama's first book, a memoir called My First Coup d'État: Memories from the Lost Decades of Africa, was published by Bloomsbury on 3 July 2012. The most promising son of an affluent government minister, he spent his childhood shuttling in his father's chauffeur-driven cars, from his elite boarding school Achimota School in Accra to his many homes. He recalls in its first chapter the day in 1966 when he learned of the ousting of Ghana's founding president, Kwame Nkrumah, in a military coup: "When I look back on my life it's clear to me that this moment marked the awakening of my consciousness. It changed my life and influenced all the moments that followed."

== Honours and awards ==
Mahama received an honorary doctorate in the field of Public Administration, from the Ekiti State University of Nigeria, formerly affiliated to the Obafemi Awolowo University in "recognition of his politico-socio economic development of Ghana and Africa at various stages of his political career." Later the same university passed a resolution to name its Faculty of Management Science after him.

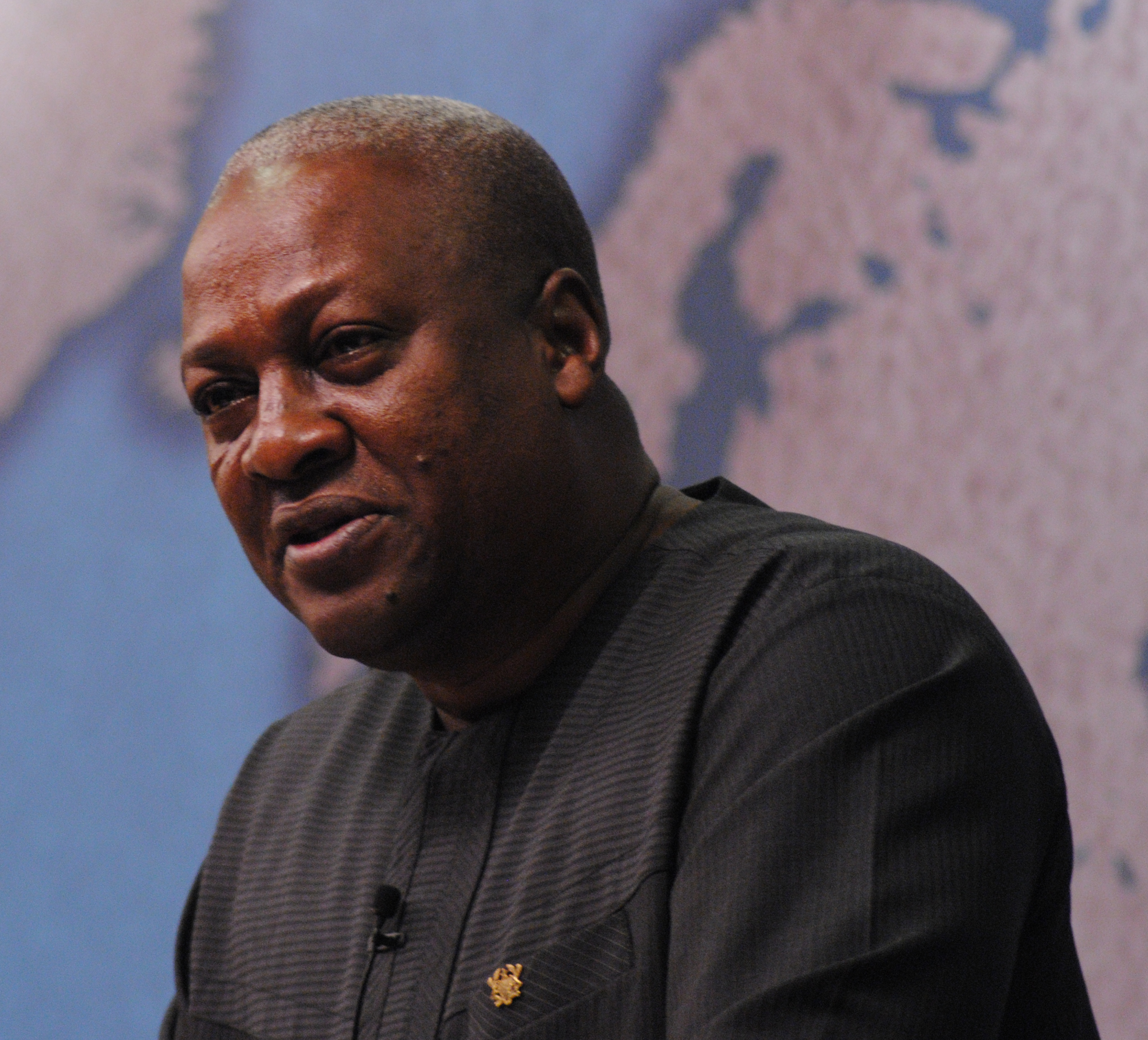
Mahama at Chatham House

The Cuban government, recognising Mahama's relentless advocacy for the Cuban cause, namely for the lifting of the 50-year economic embargo on the communist country and for the freedom of the detained Cuban five by the United States government, conferred on him the Friendship Medal. The General Council of Assemblies of God, Ghana honored Mahama with its Daniel Award. The Graduate School of Governance and Leadership also awarded him the African Servant Leadership Award while the Institute of Public Relations recognized Mahama with a prize for his leadership acumen and technocratic flair. In 2013, the Forum for Agricultural Research in Africa (FARA) conferred on Mahama the Africa Award for Excellence in Food Security and Poverty Reduction. In March 2016, the University of Aberdeen held a special convocation to confer an honorary degree of Doctors of Laws (LLD) on Mahama.

Mahama has also attended numerous conferences and won many fellowships, including a study as a visiting scholar at Johns Hopkins University, Baltimore, United States. He is also a Bill Gates Fellow. He was awarded the Great Cross of the National Order of Benin, the highest award in Benin, by President Yayi Boni.

In February 2017, Mahama received the 2016 African Political Leader of the Year Award from the African Leadership Magazine in South Africa.

In October 2022, Mahama was honored by Liberty University with a Global Leadership and Economic Impact Award in Virginia, USA. This award was to celebrate him for governing wisely, "advocating and achieving a consistent track record on economic development, women's participation in education, and enhancing economic growth."

In March 2024, Mahama was conferred with the chieftaincy title, Kuoro Sabinwero Wajia I, by Kuoro Abu Diyaka Sukabe Ninia, the Paramount Chief of the Buwaa Traditional Area in the Upper West Region.

In February 2026 John Dramani Mahama was named by Devex as the 5th Most Powerful person in the world of development and change making.

In April 2026, Mahama was honoured by Otumfuo Osei Tutu II at the Asantehene's 27th enstoolment anniversary gala at Manhyia Palace, where he received a commemorative gold coin in recognition of his role in strengthening cooperation between constitutional authority and traditional institutions.

== International recognition ==
In February 2026, international development publication Devex ranked Ghana’s President John Dramani Mahama as the fifth most powerful person in the world in the field of development and changemaking. The ranking, part of Devex’s annual Power 50 list, recognised Mahama for his leadership in advancing the Accra Reset agenda, a policy framework aimed at reshaping global development paradigms amid shifts in international aid and financing. Devex cited his advocacy for reforms in areas such as debt relief, trade and climate finance and his call for a new development model for Africa. The list places Mahama among global figures deemed influential in international development at a time of evolving global cooperation.

== See also ==
- List of current heads of state and government
- List of heads of the executive by approval rating
- List of Mills government ministers
- List of Mahama government ministers

Parliament of Ghana
Preceded by Mahama Jeduah	Member of Parliament for Bole; 1997–2009	Succeeded by Joseph Akati Saaka
Political offices
Preceded by Ekwow Spio-Garbrah	Minister for Communications; 1998–2001	Succeeded by Felix Owusu-Adjapong
Preceded by Aliu Mahama	Vice President of Ghana; 2009–2012	Succeeded by Kwesi Amissah-Arthur
Preceded by John Atta Mills	President of Ghana; 2012–2017	Succeeded by Nana Akufo-Addo
Preceded by Nana Akufo-Addo	President of Ghana; 2025–present	Incumbent
Party political offices
Preceded by Muhammad Mumuni	National Democratic Congress nominee for Vice President of Ghana; 2008	Succeeded by Kwesi Amissah-Arthur
Preceded by John Atta Mills	National Democratic Congress nominee for President of Ghana; 2012, 2016, 2020, 2024	Most recent
Diplomatic posts
Preceded by Alassane Ouattara	Chair of the Economic Community of West African States; 2014–2015	Succeeded by Macky Sall
