= Northern People's Party =

Northern’s People's Party
- Leader: S. D. Dombo
- Founded: April 1954
- Dissolved: 1957
- Merged into: United Party
- 1956 election: 15

Election symbol
- A clenched fist in black on a white background

The Northern People's Party (NPP) was a political party in the Gold Coast which aimed to protect the interests of those in the Northern region of Ghana.

The NPP's leader was S. D. Dombo, the traditional chief of Duori in the Upper Region. Formed in April 1954, the party contested the 1954 election and the 1956 election. In November 1957 it merged with other opposition parties against the Convention People's Party to form the United Party.

Founding members of the party also included Mumuni Bawumia, J.A. Braimah, Tolon Naa Yakubu Tali, Adam Amandi, Naa Abeifaa Karbo, Imoru Salifu and C.K. Tedam.

The symbol of the party was a clenched fist in black on a white background.
