= Mumuni Bawumia =

Ghanaian politician

Alhaji Mumuni Bawumia was a Ghanaian politician, lawyer and the paramount chief of Kperiga in the then Northern region of Ghana. He was chairman of the council of state in the 4th republic from 1993 to 2000.

== Career ==
Bawumia was a member of the national assembly of Ghana from 1951 to 1966. He served as clerk to the district council of Mamprusi and then to the Mamprusi state council. He was member of the Northern People's Party and later the United Party. He defected away from the United Party whilst still in parliament and cross-carpeted to the Convention People's Party in 1958. After this, he served in a number of ministerial roles in the governments of Kwame Nkrumah. He was minister for works and housing, special development commissioner for development of Accra, deputy minister, northern regional minister and then a local government minister.

He was selected to be chief of Kperiga in present-day West Mamprusi District of the North East Region of Ghana. In 1978, he was made interim chairman of the management committee of the Cocoa Marketing Board. In 1988, the PNDC government appointed him as Ghana's Ambassador to Saudi Arabia. He was elected chairman of the Council of State from 1993 to 2000, thus becoming the first chairman of the council of state in the 4th Ghanaian Republic. His son Mahamudu Bawumia is the Vice-President of Ghana.

Bawumia's father, Alhaji Mumuni Bawumia was a teacher, lawyer and politician, a Mamprugu Royal and Chief of the Kperiga Traditional Area at the time of his death in September 2002.

He was a founding member of the Northern Peoples' Party alongside Chief S. D. Dombo, Chief Abeifa Karbo, Yakubu Tali, the Tolon Naa, and J. A. Braimah, Kabachewura.

The Northern Peoples Party, together with the National Liberation Movement and other opposition political parties, later merged into the United Party, the forebear of the current New Patriotic Party.

Alhaji Bawumia served under various Ghanaian governments in various capacities, including member of the Northern Territories Council, the Gold Coast Legislative Assembly, a Member of Parliament of the First Republic, Northern Regional Minister, and Ambassador to Saudi Arabia.

Alhaji Bawumia was awarded the high national honour of Member of the Order of the Star of Ghana in March 1999. He served as chairman of the Council of State, under the presidency of J. J. Rawlings from, 1993 to 2000 in the 4th republic.

In September 2021, his mother, Hajia Mariama Bawumia, died in Accra, at age 81, and was buried later beside her husband in Kperiga, near Walewale in the Northeast Region.

== Personal life ==
He was married to Mariama Bawumia (1939-2021). They had five children together, including Mahamudu Bawumia, although Mumuni Bawumia had offspring by other consorts.

== Death ==
Mumuni Bawumia died in September 2002.
