= Alhassan Braimah =

Ghanaian politician and author

Kabachewura Alhaji Alhassan Joseph Adam Braimah, commonly known as J.A. Braimah, was a Ghanaian politician, author, chief of Kabuche. He was born into the Kanyase Royal family of Kpembe on the 31st of August, 1916 in now East Gonja Municipality of the Savannah Region. He started his education at the Tamale Infant School. He continued later at the Salaga Primary School.

When the "indirect rule system" was introduced by the British Government in then Gold Coast, J.A. Braimah was among of the first Northerners to be appointed a Native Authority Clerk in the Northern Territories of the country in 1932. Within some years of service he rose through the ranks to become a Senior Native Authority Clerk. J.A Braimah was sworn in on the 42th of July, 1950 together with two other colleagues to serves as Representatives of the Northern Territories.

In 1953 Braimah resigned from his government post as Minister of Communications and Works after admitting that he had accepted a £2,000 bribe. This triggered the setting up of a commission, led by Judge Kobina Arku Korsah, to investigate political corruption.

He served as a member in the 1951, 1954, 1956 and 1965 Parliaments of the country on the ticket of the Northern People's Party of which he was a Chief founding member. The Danquah-Busiah- Dombo tradition had a root on Northern People's Party. J. A. Braimah died at the age of 70 in 1986. He had 11 wives and 52 children.
