= Abeifaa Karbo =

Ghanaian politician (1927–2004)

Member of Parliament
- In office July 1954 – June 1965
- President: Kwame Nkrumah (1960 - 1966)
- Prime Minister: Kwame Nkrumah (1957 - 1960)
- Parliamentary group: Northern People's Party; Convention People's Party; Limann government
- Constituency: Lawra-Nandom

Commissioner for Agriculture
- In office June 1979 – September 1979
- President: Jerry Rawlings
- Preceded by: Samuel Akwagiram
- Succeeded by: E. Kwaku Twumasi

Commissioner for Health
- In office July 1977 – November 1978
- President: Jerry Rawlings
- Preceded by: Major General Odartey-Wellington

Paramount Chief of the Lawra Traditional Area
- In office November 1967 – December 2004
- Preceded by: Naa Jorbie Akodam Karbo

Personal details
- Born: Abu-Bakari As-Sadiq Abayifaa Karbo; 7 January 1927 Lawra, Gold Coast
- Died: 11 December 2004 (aged 77) Accra, Ghana
- Education: University of Ghana
- Profession: Lawyer

Naa Abeifaa Karbo II (7 January 1927 – 11 December 2004) was a Ghanaian politician, Paramount Chief of the Lawra Traditional Area and founding member of the Northern People's Party.
