= Yakubu Tali =

Ghanaian politician

Tolon Naa Alhaji Yakubu Tali

Ghanaian High Commissioner to Nigeria
- In office 1965–1968
- Preceded by: es:George Eric Kwabla Doe
- Succeeded by: es:Jacob Owusu-Akyeampong

Ghanaian Ambassador to Yugoslavia
- In office May 1970 – 1972
- Preceded by: Joseph Boye Lomotey
- Succeeded by: K. Y. Boafo

Ghanaian High Commissioner to Sierra Leone
- In office 1972–1972
- Preceded by: Vo-Na Imoru
- Succeeded by: Michael Kweku Gbagonah

Personal details
- Born: 1916 Tali, a village 32 kilometers from Tamale, Ghana
- Died: June 1986 (aged 69 or 70) Tamale, Ghana

Tolon Naa Alhaji Yakubu Alhassan Tali (1916–1986) was a Ghanaian politician, Paramount Chief of the Tolon Traditional Area and founding member of the Northern People's Party.

From 1965 to 1968, he was Ghana's High Commissioner to Lagos (Nigeria). He was Ghana's Ambassador to Belgrade (Yugoslavia) during the Second Republic.

In 1972, he was appointed Ghana's High Commissioner to Sierra Leone. He was also accredited to Guinea as an Ambassador.
