= Emmanuel Adama Mahama =

Ghanaian politician, MP and Minister of State

Northern Regional Minister
- President: Kwame Nkrumah
- Preceded by: New position
- Succeeded by: National Liberation Council

Member of Parliament for West Gonja
- Preceded by: New Position
- Succeeded by: Parliament suspended

Personal details
- Born: Damongo, Ghana
- Party: Convention People's Party
- Children: John, Ibrahim
- Occupation: Teacher; Politician

Emmanuel Adama Mahama was a Ghanaian politician. He served as a Member of Parliament during the First Republic of Ghana. He is the father of John Dramani Mahama, the 4th President of the 4th Republic of Ghana.

== Political career ==
An educator and rice farmer, he was the first Minister of State for the Northern Region under the Nkrumah government. Mahama also served as a senior presidential adviser during Ghana's Third Republic under Hilla Limann. He was also the first MP from the West Gonja constituency.

== Personal life ==
He was a Presbyterian. His son, John Dramani Mahama, was the president of Ghana from July 2012 until January 2017 and again since January 2025. His younger son, Ibrahim Mahama, is a businessman.

== See also ==
- Nkrumah government

Parliament of Ghana
New title	Member of Parliament for West Gonja; 1954 – 1966	Succeeded by parliament dissolved after coup
Political offices
New title	Northern Regional Minister ? –1966	Succeeded by executive dissolved after coup
