= Simon Diedong Dombo =

Ghanaian politician

Duori Naa Simon Diedong Dombo

Member of the Ghana Parliament for Jirapa/Lambussie District
- In office 1969–1972

Minister for Interior
- In office 1969–1971
- President: Edward Akufo-Addo
- Prime Minister: Kofi Abrefa Busia
- Preceded by: John Willie Kofi Harlley
- Succeeded by: Nicholas Yaw Boafo Adade

Minister for Health
- President: Edward Akufo-Addo
- Prime Minister: Kofi Abrefa Busia
- Preceded by: Gibson Dokyi Ampaw

Duori Naa
- In office 17 April 1949 – 19 March 1998

Personal details
- Born: 1925
- Died: 19 March 1998 (aged 72–73)
- Party: Northern People's Party
- Other political affiliations: United Party; Progress Party

Simon Diedong Dombo (1925–1998) was a Ghanaian politician, teacher and chief. He was a Member of Parliament that represented Jirapa-Lambussie District in the first Parliament of the first and second Republic of Ghana.

== Early life and education ==
Simon was born in 1925. and attended Government Teacher Training College Tamale where he obtained his Teachers' Training Certificate.

== Career ==
As the Douri-Na, he was reputed to be the first educated chieftain in the Upper Region of Ghana. He was one of the founders of the Northern People's Party, which later merged with the United Party.

== Politics ==
During the Second Republic, he was also a member of the first parliament under the membership of the ruling Progress Party. He was elected in the 1969 Ghanaian general elections. He was Minister for Health and then Minister for Interior in the Busia government.

He was banned from holding elected office by the Supreme Military Council prior to the 1979 elections. S. D. Dombo was among the early educated chieftains.

== Personal life ==
He was a Catholic Christian and he had more than 30 children. He died on 19 March 1998.

== See also ==
- Busia government
- List of MPs elected in the 1969 Ghanaian parliamentary election
- Minister for Health (Ghana)
- Minister for the Interior (Ghana)

Parliament of Ghana
Preceded by ?	Member of Parliament; 1957–65	Succeeded by ?
Preceded by ?	Member of Parliament; 1969–72	Succeeded by ?
Political offices
Preceded by John Willie Kofi Harlley	Minister for the Interior; 1969–71	Succeeded by Nicholas Yaw Boafo Adade
Preceded by ?	Minister for Health; 1971– ?	Succeeded by G.D. Ampaw
