= Dago =

Dago or Dagö may refer to:

== Places ==
- Dagö/Dagø, the Swedish/Danish name of Hiiumaa, Estonia
- Dago, Ghana, a village
- Dago, Bandung, an area in Bandung, West Java, Indonesia
- Dago Creek, Alaska
- The Hill, St. Louis, in St. Louis, Missouri, was referred to as "Dago Hill" in the early 20th century

== People ==
- Ananias Leki Dago (born 1970), Ivorian photographer
- Charles Dago (born 1975), Ivorian footballer
- Nadrey Dago (born 1997), Ivorian footballer
- Dapo Abiodun (born 1960), Nigerian politician
- Dago García, Colombian film producer Darío Armando García Granados (born 1962)
- Frank Cirofici (1887–1914), also known as Dago Frank, Italian-American gangster
- Frank Salvatore, also known as Mike the Dago, early 20th century Italian-American bootblack and politician

== Arts and entertainment ==
- Dagö (band), an Estonian folk rock band
  - Dagö (album), the band's 2000 debut album
- Dago (comics), a Paraguayan comic book character

== Other uses ==
- Dago (slur), an ethnic slur referring to Italians, and sometimes Spaniards and Portuguese
- DAGO, a U.S. government and military acronym for Department of the Army General Officer
- DAGO (Directly Appointed Gazetted Officer), a rank in the Central Armed Police Forces of India

== See also ==
- Bukit Dago
- Dego (disambiguation)
