= Asenema Waterfall =

Waterfall in the Eastern Region of Ghana

- Interactive map of Asenema Waterfall
- Location: Asenema, Okere District, Eastern Region, Ghana
- Coordinates: 6.0483°N 0.1078°W
- Type: Plunge waterfall
- Elevation: 245 m (804 ft)
- Total height: 15–20 m (49–66 ft)
- Number of drops: 1
- Average width: 5–7 m (seasonal)
- Watercourse: Tributary of the Ayensu River
- Average flow rate: Seasonal; strongest during April–July rains

Asenema Waterfall is a small waterfall located near the community of Asenema in the Okere constituency, a few kilometres north of Akropong in the Akuapim North Municipal District of the Eastern Region of Ghana. It lies at the base of the forested Akuapem Hills.

== Description ==
The waterfall drops from a rocky escarpment into a shallow, clear pool. The falls’ height is estimated between 15 and 20 metres, with a single, vertical drop typical of plunge-type waterfalls. A small wooden footbridge and natural footpath lead visitors from the roadside to the falls through secondary forest and bamboo groves.

== Location ==
Asenema lies approximately 3 km northwest of Akropong and 47 km northeast of Accra. The site is situated along the Aburi–Akropong–Asenema road, about a 15-minute drive from Akropong and roughly 1.5 hours from central Accra by car. The surrounding landscape is part of the forested Akuapem Ridge and settlements such as Aburi and Tutu.

=== When to visit ===
Asenema Waterfall is most impressive during the rainy season, typically from April to July, when rainfall increases water volume. In the dry season (December–March), flow may reduce significantly, though the shaded environment and clear pool remain attractive to visitors.

== Gallery ==
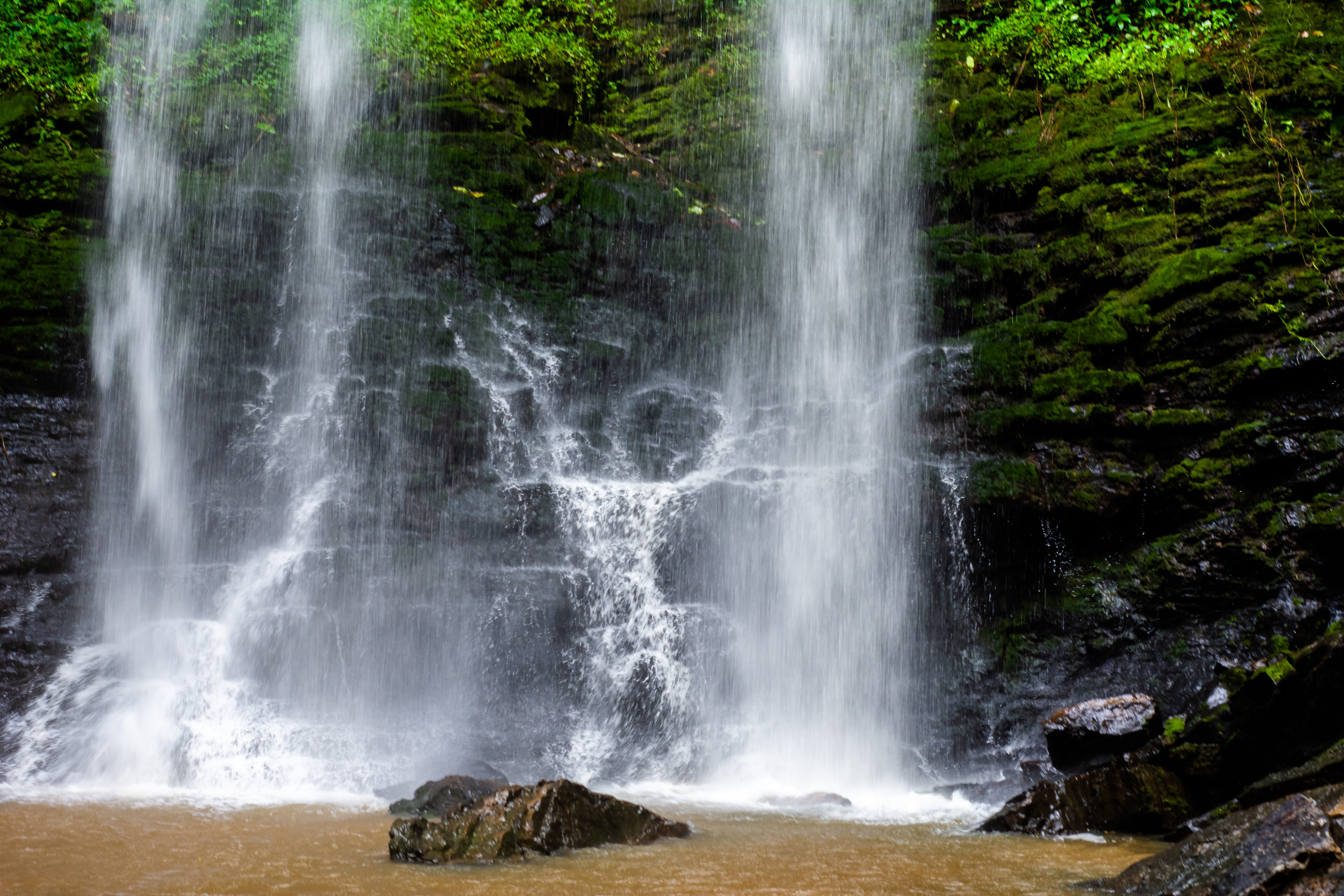
Asenema Waterfall, Eastern Region, Ghana

== See also ==
- Umbrella Rock
- Akaa Falls
- Boti Falls
- List of waterfalls
