= Ashalaja =

Town in the Greater Accra region of Ghana

- Location within Ghana
- Coordinates: 5°39′52″N 0°21′54″W
- Country: Ghana
- Region: Greater Accra Region
- District: Ga West Municipality
- Time zone: GMT
  - Summer (DST): GMT
- Postcode district: GB

Ashalaja is a town near Amasaman in the Ga West Municipality in the Greater Accra region of Ghana.
