= Koforidua Jackson Park =

Community center

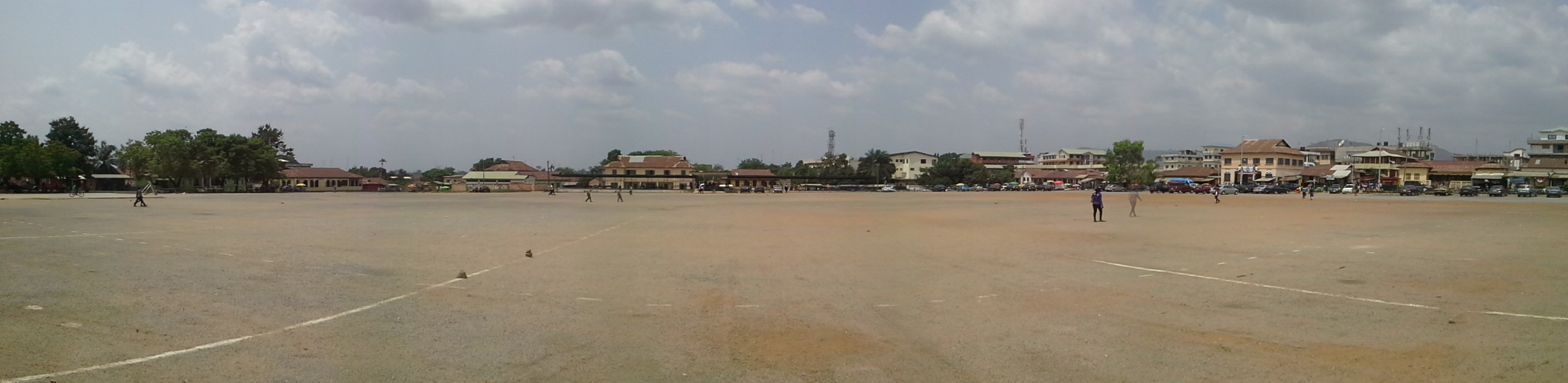
- Koforidua Jackson Park
- Interactive map of Koforidua Jackson Park
- Former names: Oforidua
- Address: Koforidua; Ghana
- Location: Easter Region
- Coordinates: 6.08913°N 0.25848°W

Koforidua Jackson Park, situated in Koforidua, the capital of the Eastern Region of Ghana, serves as both a community center and a public service park. This facility hosts a wide range of events, including funerals, weddings, church activities, concerts, government functions, and more.

== History ==
According to Nana Yaa Daani II, the Queenmother of New Juaben, the park's history traces back to the colonial era. Originally named Oforidua after a man who planted neem trees for shade for the Ga and Akyem traders, who traded in fish, salt and plantain, it later became known as Jackson Park, named after a white man involved in the cocoa trade. Jackson's passion for sports like basketball, football, and other sports on the park, led to the renaming of the park.

On July 5, 2021, The New Juaben South Municipal Assembly, in collaboration with the Ministry of Local Government, Decentralization, and Rural Development, launched the Koforidua Jackson Park redevelopment project. This initiative received financial backing from the World Bank under the Ghana Secondary Cities Support Program (GSCSP).

== Events ==
- On 13th August, 2025, a vigil night was held at the Koforidua Jackson Park to honour Dr Edward Omane Boamah(former defence minister) and seven others who died in the August 6 helicopter crash.
