= Densuano (Koforidua) =

Village in Ghana

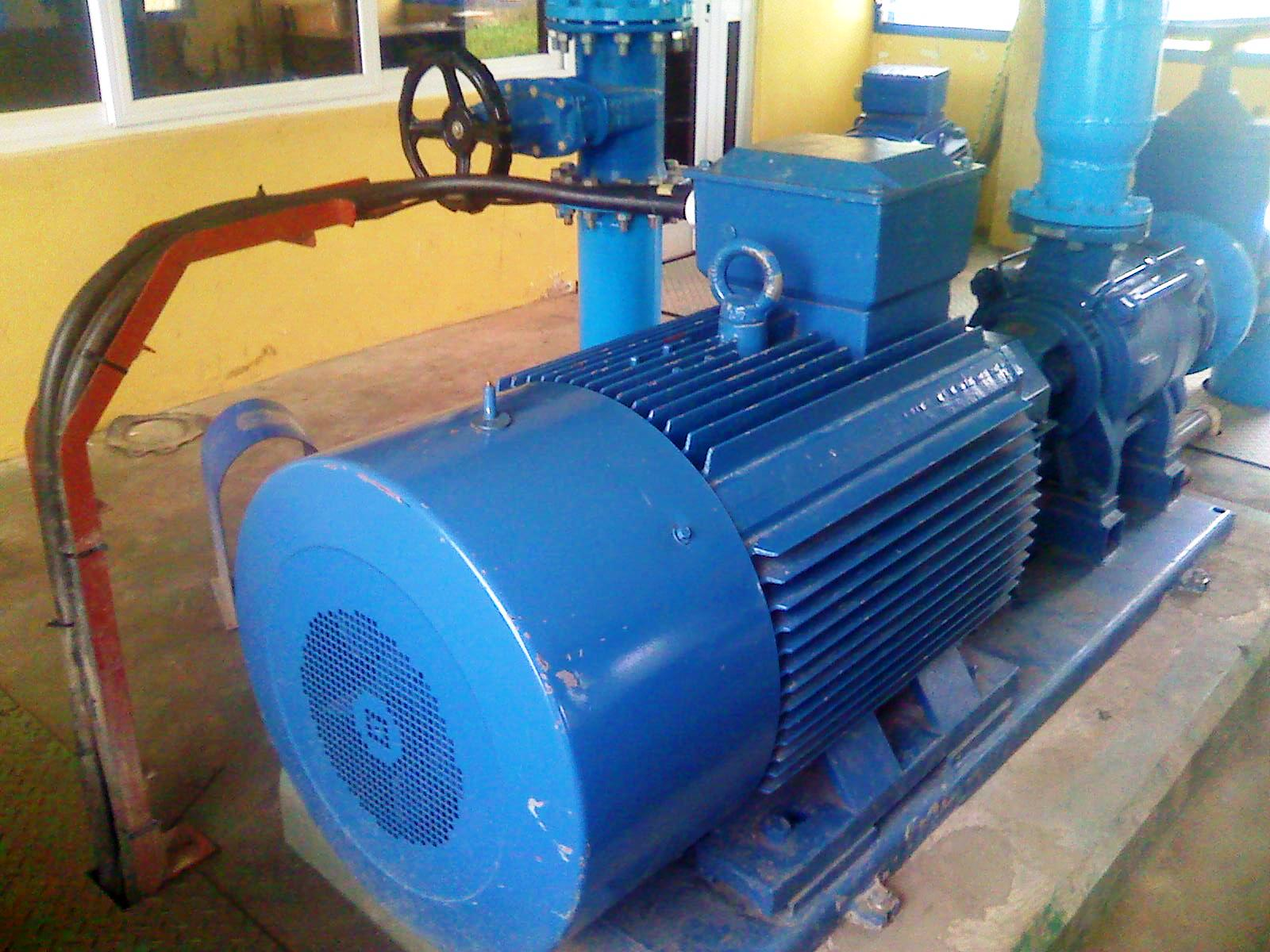
Eastern region's and Densu River's Densuano water supply pumping station at Koforidua in the New-Juaben Municipal

Densuano, also called Water Works, is a small village in Koforidua in the Eastern Region of Ghana. Densuano is a village with not more than 2,000 inhabitants. The village is near the Densu dam which used to serve the Koforidua township and its neighboring environment. For several years, this dam supplied water to a filtering station at Ada for further treatment.

== Etymology ==
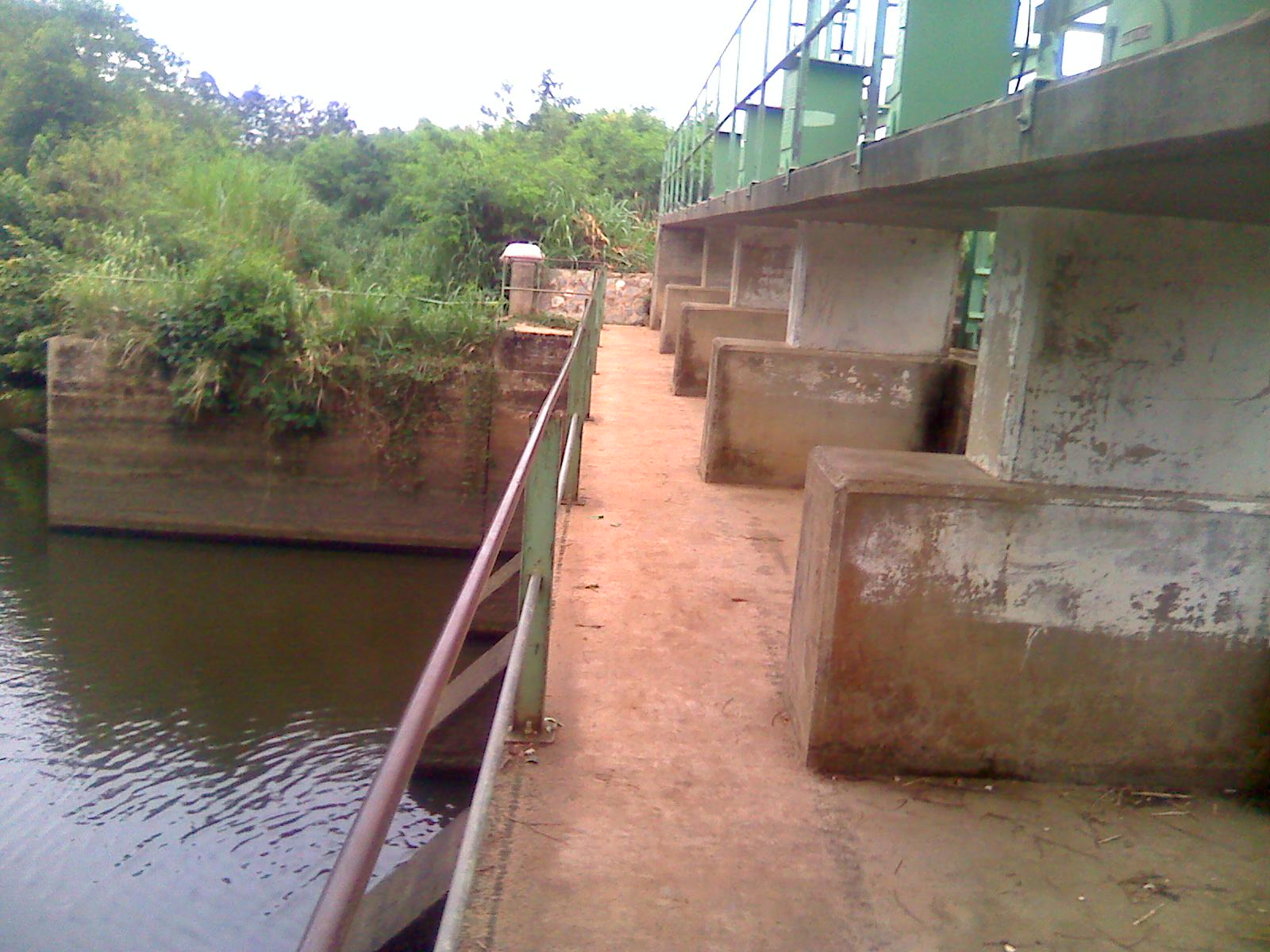
Eastern region's Densuano Dam at Koforidua in the New-Juaben Municipal

The word Densu is a name of a river which source from the Eastern Region. It passes through Koforidua at this small village. The Densu river is believed to be a god which is worshiped by many. At times, in serious issues, people rely on this river for curses and other rituals. In certain instances, sacrifice is delivered to the river for a purpose, such as for peace, rainfall, etc.

In Twi, the ending part of the word, Ano literally means mouth or beginning or start of. The village therefore was called Densuano simply meaning the beginning of Densu. However, the village is not at the source of the Densu river. Other inhabitants live across the dam, making the dam form a division. The name of the area of those living across the river is Densuagya, meaning outskirt of Densu.

== Description ==
Inhabitants of this village are basically palm wine tappers, fishermen and farmers. Abɛ, which in English means, Palm Tree, is highly respected in the area for its ability to produce palm wine which can further be processed to get Akpɛteshie, a strong dry gin. Many of the youth in the area are also laborers in masonry. The village has a football team, a cinema center, and a video game center.

== Administration ==
Densu River Dam in Koforidua

The Assembly Woman of Densuano, called Esther Gyeki, won assembly level elections in the year 2011 and was sworn in 2012. Apart from the Assembly Woman who represents Densuano in legal matters and as a government representative, there are other leaders, of which the most recognized of all is the Odikurow, who is the local chief.

== Future Plans ==
The road leading to Densuano is planned to link Koforidua to Suhum through to Accra. The dam in the village which was constructed some decades ago will be renovated to allow road traffic on it. This alternative is being worked on since the bridge at Suhum is dilapidated and poses risk of harming motorists and pedestrians.

Densuano has an airport demarcated area and some reserved hotel lands.
