= Oyoko (disambiguation) =

Oyoko is one of the eight clans of the Akans. The name has been used to refer to some towns in Ghana.

== Clan ==
Oyoko (clan)

== Towns ==
- Oyoko
- Oyoko, Koforidua

== Other ==
- Oyoko Methodist Senior High School
