= Alfred Jonas Dowuona-Hammond =

Ghanaian politician

Member of the Ghana Parliament for Effutu constituency
- In office 1965–1966

Member of the Ghana Parliament for Awutu constituency
- In office 1954–1965

Minister of Communications
- In office 1964–1966
- President: Dr. Kwame Nkrumah
- Preceded by: Krobo Edusei

Minister of Education and Social Welfare
- In office 1960–1964
- President: Dr. Kwame Nkrumah
- Succeeded by: Kwaku Boateng

Parliamentary Secretary at the Ministry of Education
- In office 1957–1960
- President: Dr. Kwame Nkrumah

Personal details
- Born: 17 June 1920 Pampanso, Gold Coast
- Citizenship: Ghanaian
- Education: Mfantsipim School, Accra Academy, O'Reilly Institute

Alfred Jonas Dowuona-Hammond was a Ghanaian politician and a state minister in the first republic. He served as Minister of Education and Social Welfare and Minister of Communications in the Nkrumah government.

== Early life and education ==
Dowuona-Hammond was born on 17 June 1920 at Pampanso; a village in the Eastern Region to Hansen Dowuona-Hammond and Madam Beatrice Nettey.

He had his early education at Sempe Government Junior Boys' School and Rowe Road Government Senior Boys' School in Accra. He had his secondary education at Mfantsipim School, the Accra Academy and O'Reilly Educational Institute where he obtained his Cambridge School Certificate with exemption from the London Matriculation Examination in 1940.

== Career ==
After completing his secondary school education in 1940, Alfred joined the staff of the O'Reilly Educational Institute rising to the position of assistant head master in his two-year tenure as a staff of the school. In 1942 he was employed by the United Africa Company (UAC) as probationer manager. He served in the company for five years working in Koforidua, Accra and Sekondi. He joined the staff of CPP's national schools in 1947. He founded the Winneba Secondary School in 1949 and in 1950 he served the government as an inspector of cooperatives.

== Politics ==
In 1950, CPP leaders were arrested and the CPP national schools were consequently closed down, however, in 1951, he was called to the movement's headquarters in Winneba when the CPP won the general election that year. In 1954, he was elected member of the legislative assembly representing the Awutu constituency; where his mother's hometown is situated. He won the seat in the subsequent elections that took place in the first republic. In 1956, he was appointed parliamentary secretary to the ministry of Labour and Co-operatives. He was promoted as Minister of Education when Ghana became a republic in July 1960. He served in this capacity for four years. In 1964 he was appointed Minister of Communications. He remained in this position until February 1966 when the Nkrumah government was overthrown by the NLC.

== Personal life ==
His hobbies included gardening, football, athletics and music.

== See also ==
- Nkrumah government
- Minister for Education (Ghana)
- Minister for Communications (Ghana)
