= Achiaman =

Town in Greater Accra, Ghana

- Location within Ghana
- Coordinates: 5°41′54″N 0°19′43″W
- Country: Ghana
- Region: Greater Accra Region
- District: Ga West Municipality
- Time zone: GMT
  - Summer (DST): GMT
- Postcode district: GB

Achiaman is a town near Amasaman in the Ga West Municipality in the Greater Accra region of Ghana.
