= New Juaben Municipal District =

- Former Municipal District
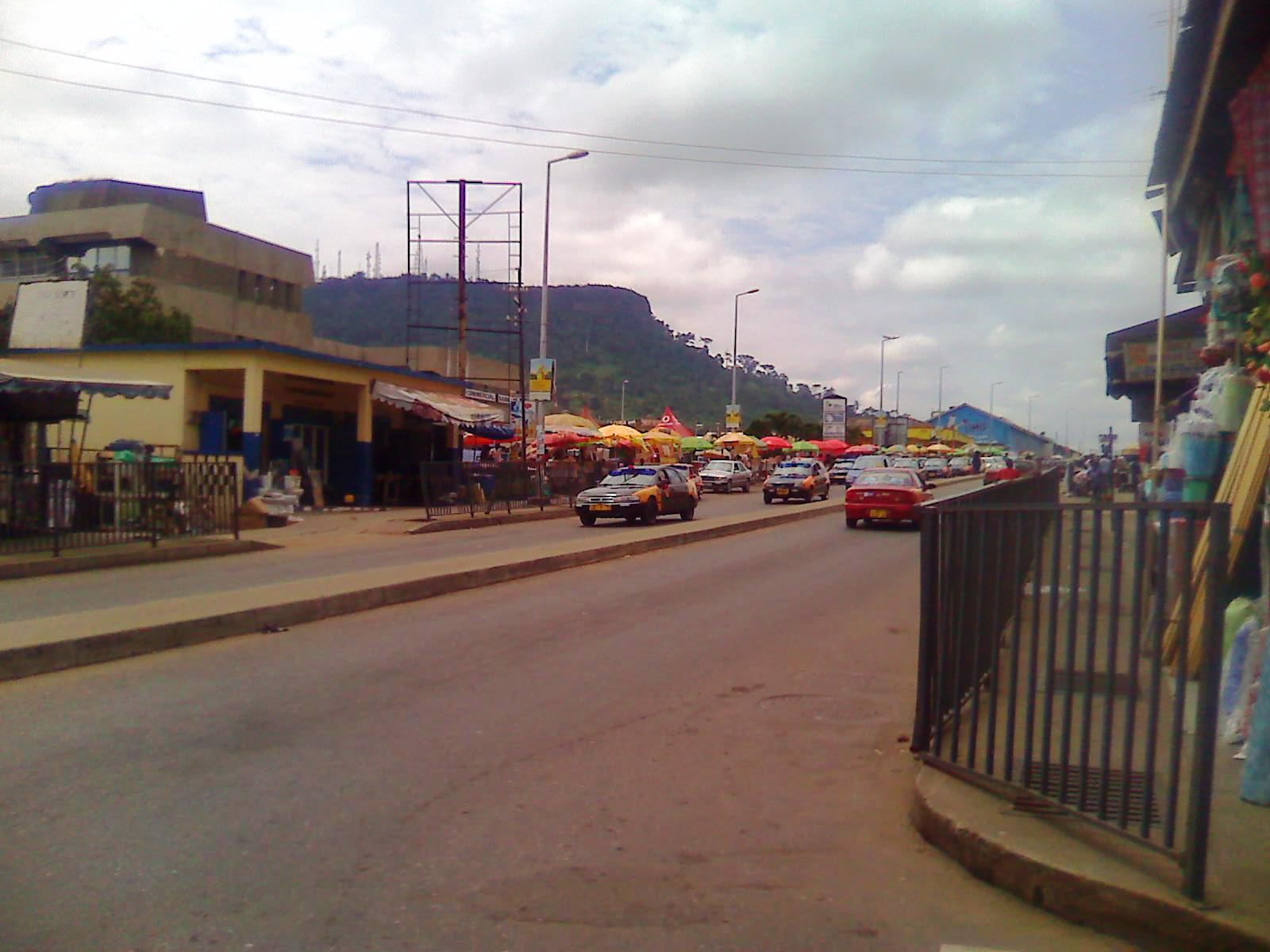
- Highway in Koforidua

- Seal

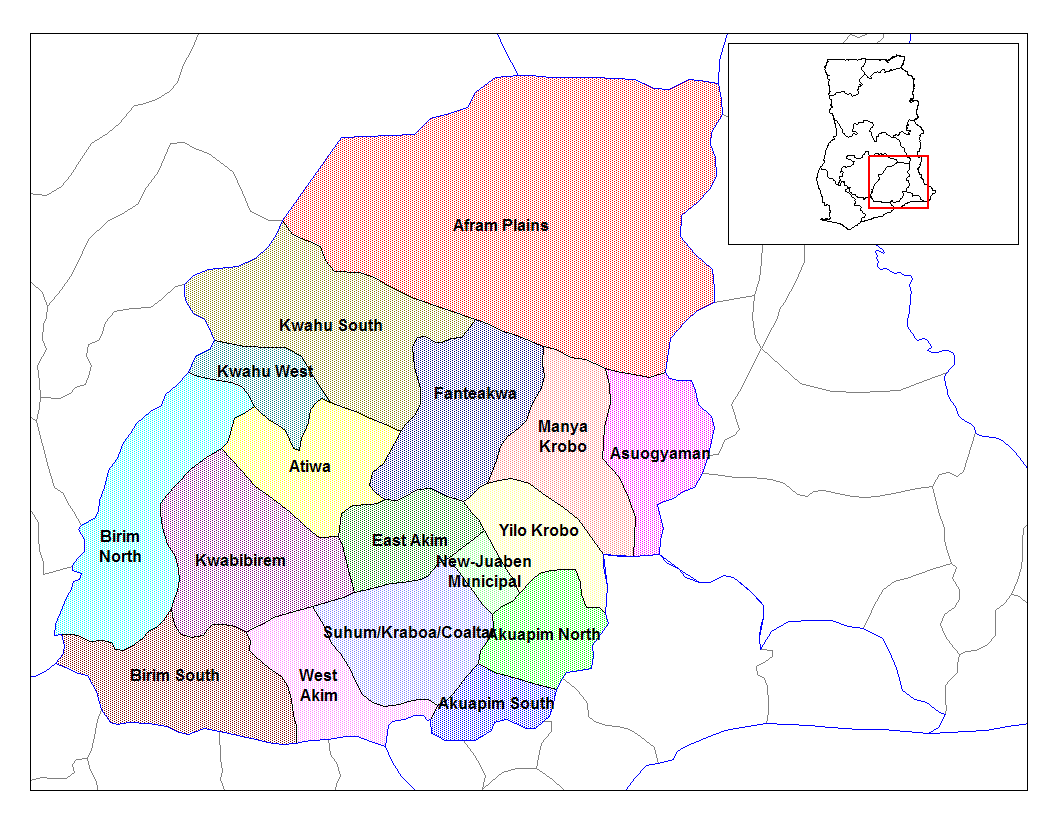
- Districts of Eastern Region

- Location of New Juaben Municipal District within Eastern
- Coordinates: 6°5′38.4″N 0°15′32.4″W
- Country: Ghana
- Region: Eastern
- Capital: Koforidua

Government
  - Municipal Chief Executive: Kwasi Adjei-Boateng

Population (2012)
  - Total: —
- Time zone: UTC+0 (GMT)

New Juaben Municipal District is a former district that was located in Eastern Region, Ghana. Originally created as a municipal district assembly in 1988. However on 1 November 2017 (effective 15 March 2018), it was split out into two new municipal districts: New Juaben South Municipal District (capital: Koforidua) and New Juaben North Municipal District (capital: Effiduase). The municipality was located in the central part of Eastern Region and had Koforidua as its capital town.

== Geography ==
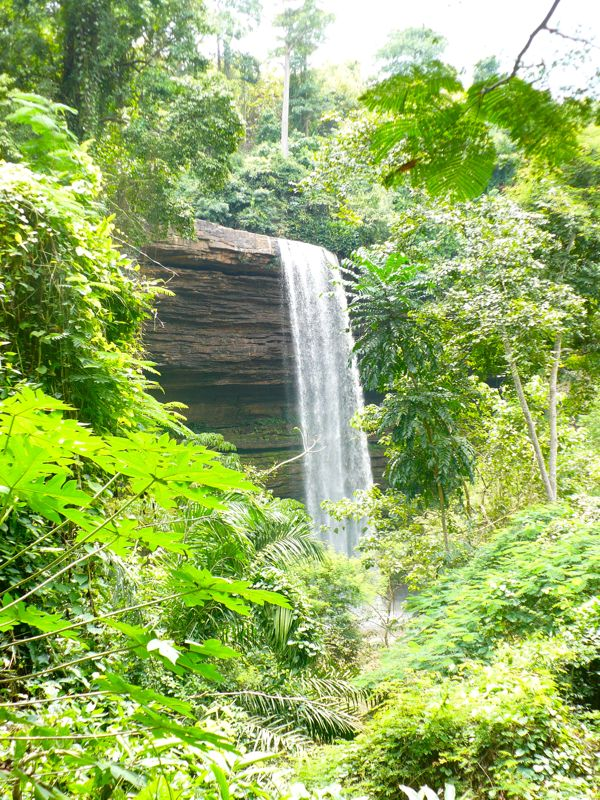
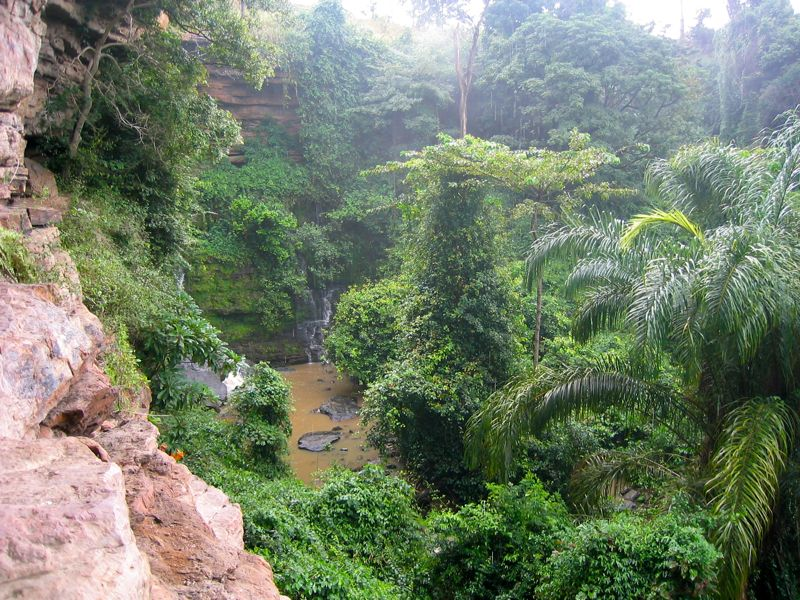
Left:Boti Falls. Right:Akan Falls.

New Juaben Municipal District fell within Eastern Region of Ghana. New Juaben Municipality covered an estimated area of 110 square kilometers constituting 0.57% of the total land area of Eastern Region.

A predominant natural feature in Koforidua is the 'Obuo Tabri' Mountain, which is considered sacred. Nearby is Akosombo Dam which holds Lake Volta, the world's largest man-made lake. Waterfalls in the area such as Akan Falls and Boti Falls and the Umbrella Rock attract tourists to New Juaben Municipal District and Eastern Region.

=== Weather ===
New Juaben Municipal District had an annual rainfall ranging from 50 – 120 inches and 20 – 32 Celsius mean annual temperatures.

== Boundaries ==
New Juaben Municipal District shared boundaries with East Akim Municipality to the northeast, Akuapim North District to the east and south and Suhum Kraboa Coaltar District to the west.

== List of settlements ==
Settlements of New Juaben Municipal District
No.	Settlement	Population	Population year
1	Abotanso		
2	Adom Ponsu Boampong		
3	Akwadum		
4	effiduase		
5	Asikasu Asuogya		
6	Asokore		
7	Betom		
8	Dansuagya		
9	Densu Dam Site		
10	Effiduase		
11	Jumapo		
12	Ketenkye		
13	Kofikrom		
14	Koforidua	130,810	2013
15	Koforidua-Ada		
16	Koforidua Korle Kwanta		
17	Mpaem		
18	Nyerede Okper		
19	Nyerede Trom		
20	Oyoko		
21	Srodae		
22	Suhyen		
23			
