= Weija Dam =

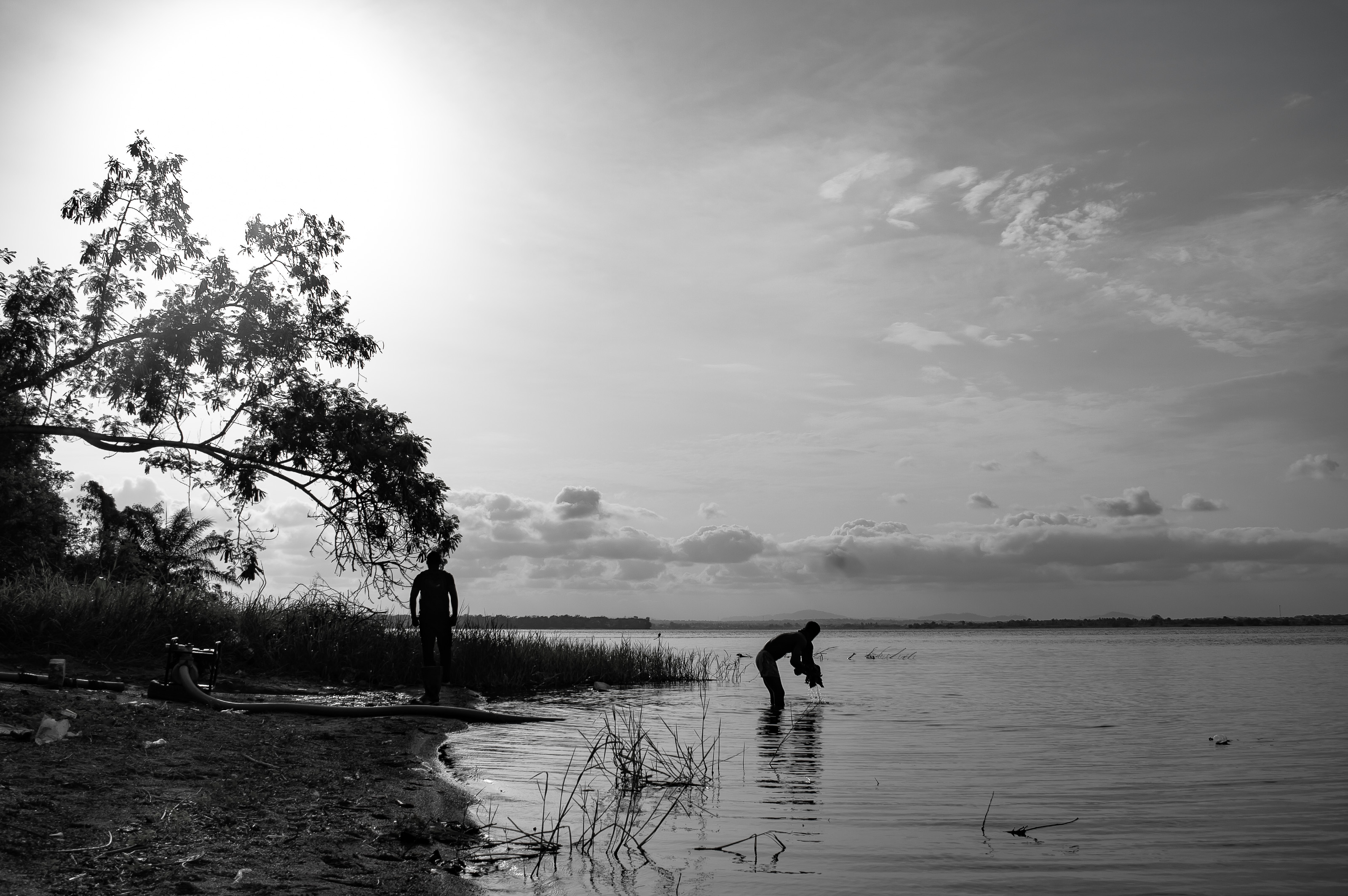

- Location within Ghana
- Country: Ghana
- Location: Weija, Accra, Greater Accra Region
- Coordinates: 5°34′11″N 0°20′39″W
- Purpose: Municipal water supply
- Status: Operational
- Operator: Ghana Water Company

Dam and spillways
- Impounds: Densu River

Weija Dam is a dam on the Densu River which supports the main water treatment plant for Accra. It is operated by the Ghana Water Company. The dam supplies about 80 percent of the potable water for the entire city of Accra and its surrounding environs. Its construction began in 1974 and was completed in 1978 by Messrs Tahi, an Italian Company.

== Spillage ==
In June 2014, there was spillage from the dam that caused flooding in the area of Glefe. Victims claimed that the flooding was as a result of the Bortianor Traditional Council refusal to dredge the river that flowed into the sea until the Homowo festival had ended.

In March 2017 the Ghana Water Company began to spill water from the dam to prevent the water contained in it exceeding its maximum limit. This was necessary due to the rainy season. This caused flooding in the Tetegu, and Oblogo areas.

In March 2021 the gates were opened due to an abrupt rise of 1.9 feet of water over a 24-hour period. This increased the water level from 46.2 feet to 48.1 feet which was 1.1 feet above the safe operating level which is 47 feet. This was necessary to guard against the risk of the dam collapsing.

In October 2022, the dam was spilled twice. This was due to heavy rainfall.The water level when the gates of the dam were opened at the beginning of the month was 49.5 feet and 47.9 feet when it was spilled later.
