= Ga West Municipal Assembly =

Municipal District in Greater Accra Region, Ghana

- Municipal Assembly
- Districts of Greater Accra Region

- Location of Ga West Municipal Assembly within Greater Accra
- Coordinates: 5°42′9″N 0°18′0″W
- Country: Ghana
- Region: Greater Accra
- Capital: Amasaman

Government
  - Municipal Chief Executive: Hon. Ebenezer Nii Armah Tackie
  - Succeeded: Hon. Nana Bra, Okae

Population (2021)
  - Total: 314,299
- Time zone: UTC+0 (GMT)
- ISO 3166 code: GH-AA-GW

Ga West Municipal Assembly is one of the twenty-nine districts in Greater Accra Region, Ghana. Originally it was formerly part of the then-larger Ga District in 1988, until the eastern part of the district was split off to create Ga East District in 2004; thus the remaining part has been renamed as Ga West District. Later, the western part of the district was split off to create the first Ga South Municipal Assembly on 29 February 2008 (which was later split into two new districts: Weija Gbawe Municipal Assembly (capital: Weija) and the present Ga South Municipal Assembly (capital: Ngleshie Amanfro) on 15 March 2018), with Weija as its capital town; while Ga West was later elevated to municipal district assembly status during that same year to become Ga West Municipal District. However on 15 March 2018, the eastern part of the district has split off to create Ga North Municipal Assembly, thus the remaining part has been retained as Ga West Municipal Assembly. The municipality is located in the western part of Greater Accra Region and has Amasaman as its capital town.

== History ==
The Ga West Municipal Assembly was established by L.I 1858 in November 2007 and it is the gateway to Accra on the Kumasi Accra route. The Municipality lies within latitude 50°48’ North, 5°39 North and longitude 0°12 west and 0°22 West. It shares common boundaries with Ga East and Accra Metropolitan Assembly to the East, Akuapem South to the North and Ga South to the south and West. It occupies a land area of approximately 305.4sq km with about 193 communities. The Ga West Municipal Area is located within the Densu River Basin, making it a very important riparian zone. Ga East and Ga South were created out of the then Ga District now Ga West Municipal Assembly (GWMA).

== Sources ==
- "Districts of Ghana". Statoids.
- GhanaDistricts.com
