= Effiduase (disambiguation) =

Effiduase may refer to

- Effiduase a town in the Ashanti Region
- Koforidua-Effiduase a town in the Eastern Region of Ghana
