= Ga District =

- Former District
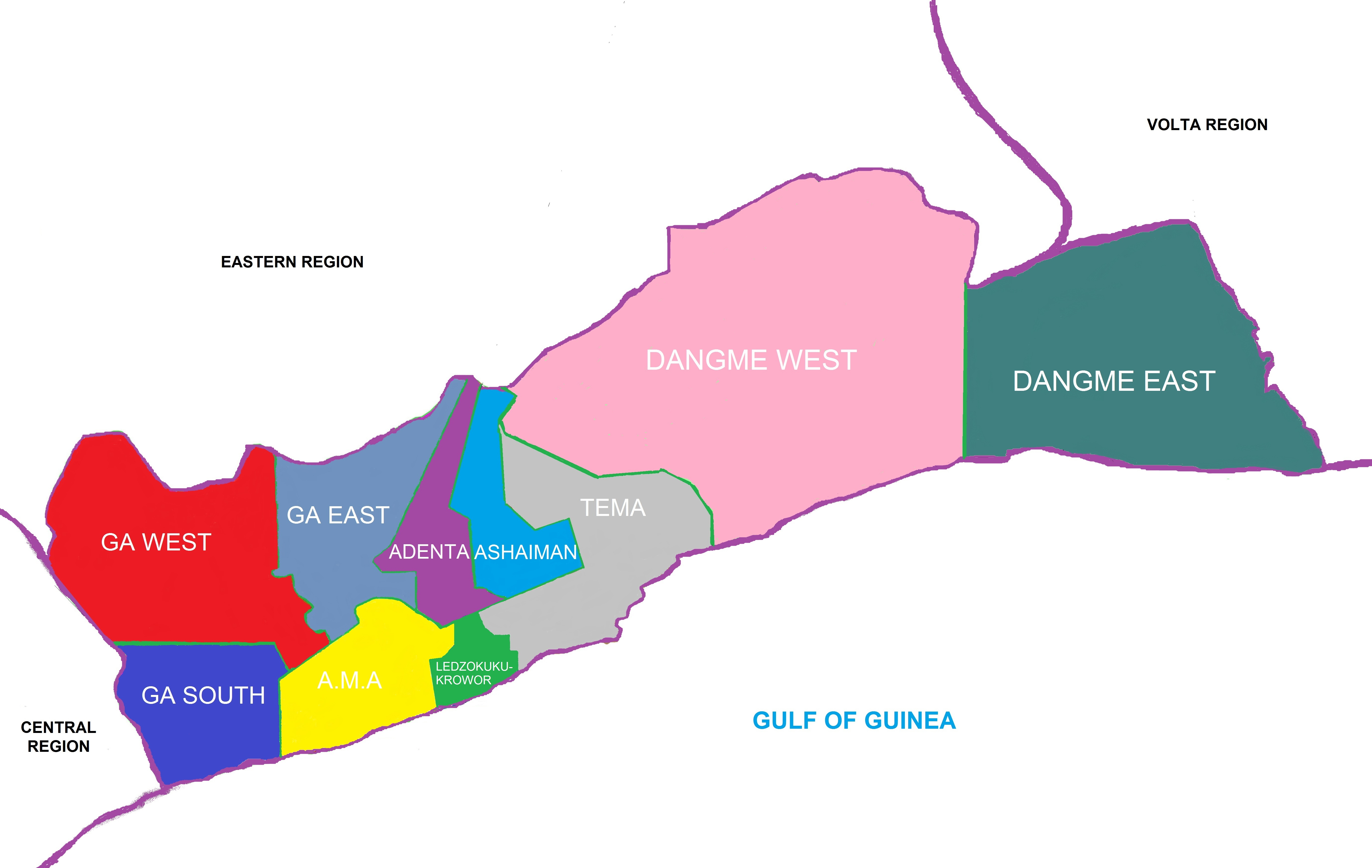
- Districts of Greater Accra Region

- Location of Ga District within Greater Accra
- Coordinates: 5°42′22.32″N 0°18′6.84″W
- Country: Ghana
- Region: Greater Accra
- Capital: Amasaman
- Time zone: UTC+0 (GMT)
- ISO 3166 code: GH-AA-GA

Ga District is a former district that was located in Greater Accra Region, Ghana. Originally created as an ordinary district assembly in 1988. However in 2004, it was split off into two new districts: Ga West District (which it was elevated to municipal district assembly status on 29 February 2008; capital: Amasaman) and Ga East District (which it was also elevated to municipal district assembly status on 29 February 2008; capital: Abokobi). The district assembly was located in the western part of Greater Accra Region and had Amasaman as its capital town.

== Tribes ==
The Ga District is divided in different sub-areas. The Ga people are the original citizens of the Ga District. Today Ga is a melting pot of different cultural and ethnic groups from all over the world.

== Important historical GaDangmemei ==
Great GaDangme historical personalities who contributed significantly to the development of the GaDangme people, traditions, and culture, and Ghana (formerly, the Gold Coast) include:

- Dr. Ebenezer Ako Adjei (1916-2002)
- Dr. Benjamin Quartey-Papafio (1859-1924)
- Lt. General Joseph Arthur Ankrah (1915-1992), soldier and head of state 1966–69.
- Sir Emmanuel Quist (died 1959), judge and politician
- Nene Annorkwei II (born 1900), QMC, GM
- Rev. Carl Christian Reindorf (1834-1917)
- Rev. Samuel Richard Brew Attoh-Ahuma (1863-1921)
- Christian Josiah Reindorf (1868-1937)
- Edmund Bannerman (1832-1903)
- Rev. John Ahoomah Solomon
- George Cleland
- Daniel Quaye Tawiah ("Kwei Nungua")
- Rev. E. A. W. Engmann (1903-1983)
- King Tackie Yaaboi
- Hon. John Glover-Addo (1873-1933), lawyer and politician
- King Tackie Tawiah I
- Hon. Thomas Hutton-Mills, Sr. (1865-1931), lawyer and politician
- Chief John Vanderpuije
- Hon. Sir Nene Azu Mate-Kole
- Hon. Dr. Frederick Nanka-Bruce (1878-1953), physician, journalist and politician
- Tetteh Quarshie (1842-1892), father of Ghana's cocoa industry
