= Akuapim =

Akuapim may refer to:

- Akuapim North District, a district of the Eastern Region of Ghana
- Akuapim South District, a district of the Eastern Region of Ghana
