= Nsawam Adoagyire (municipal district) =

Nsawam-Adoagyire Municipal District
- Municipal District
- Districts of Eastern Region

- Location of Nsawam-Adoagyire Municipal District within Eastern
- Coordinates: 5°48′36.09″N 0°21′0.68″W
- Country: Ghana
- Region: Eastern
- Capital: Nsawam

Government
  - Municipal Chief Executive: Godfred Osei-Bonsu Twum

Area
  - Total: 440 km^{2} (170 sq mi)

Population (2021)
  - Total: 155,597
- Time zone: UTC+0 (GMT)

Nsawam-Adoagyire Municipal District is one of the thirty-three districts in Eastern Region, Ghana. Originally created as an ordinary district assembly in 1988 when it was known as the first Akuapim South District, which it was created from the former Akuapim District Council; until it was elevated to municipal district assembly status to become Akuapim South Municipal District, with Nsawam as its capital town. However on 6 February 2012, the northeast part of the district was split off to create a new Akuapim South District, with Aburi as its capital town; thus the remaining part has been renamed as Nsawam-Adoagyire Municipal District, with Nsawam as its capital town. The municipality is located in the southeast part of Eastern Region and has Nsawam as its capital town.

== Geography ==
Nsawam-Adoagyire Municipal District lies in the southwestern part of the Eastern Region. It borders Suhum Municipal District in the northwest, and Akuapim North Municipal District in the northeast. It covers an area of 440 square kilometres (170 sq mi).

=== Topography ===
It has an undulating topography with two main ecological zones, the moist semi-deciduous forest and coastal savannah grassland. The district is dependent on the river Densu for water supply at the Nsawam-Adoagyire Municipal District water treatment plant.

== List of settlements ==
Settlements of Nsawam-Adoagyire Municipal District
No.	Settlement	Population	Population year
1	Aburi	18,701	2013
2	Adoagyiri		
3	Adamorobe		
4	Adeiso		
5	Ahwerase		
6	Ahwerease		
7	Amanfrom		
8	Ankwa Dobro		
9	Anoff		
10	Berekuso		
11	Dago		
12	Darmang		
13	Fotobi		
14	Konkonuru		
15	Kitase		
16	Nsakye		
17	Nsawam	44,522	2013
18	Ntoaso		
19	Owuraku		
20	Pakro		
21	Pampanso		
22	Pokrom		
23	Sekyikrom		
24	Peduase		

== Sources ==
- "Akuapim South Municipal District". Statoids.
- Districts: Akuapim South Municipal District
