= Dedeiman =

Community in Greater Accra Region, Ghana

- Town
- Location of Dedeiman in Greater Accra Region
- Coordinates: 05°45′10.5″N 00°24′36″W
- Country: Ghana
- Region: Greater Accra Region
- District: Ga West District
- Time zone: UTC0 (GMT)

Dedeiman is a community in the Ga West District in the Greater Accra Region of Ghana. currently under the leadership of Abusuapanin Nana Kwaku Nyarko II and his family elders. As of January 13, 2026, the family head of the community is Abusuapanyin Nana Kwaku Nyarko II in the absence of Nana Odei former chief and Osiahene of Brekusu who passed 5 years ago and was buried in June 2026. A new Chief and Osiahene of Deideman and Brekusu respectively is yet to be installed.

== Education ==
Dedeiman M/A School is located in the community.

== Notable natives ==
- Beatrice Agbalenyo, Assembly member of the community.
