= Adoagyiri =

Adoagyiri Nsawam-Adoagyiri
- Village
- Location of Adoagyiri in Eastern Region
- Coordinates: 5°49′N 0°21′W
- Country: Ghana
- Region: Eastern Region
- municipality: Nsawam Adoagyire Municipal District

Population (2013)
  - Total: —
- Time zone: GMT
  - Summer (DST): GMT

Adoagyiri is a town in the Nsawam Adoagyire Municipal District, a district in the Eastern Region of Ghana. Adoagyiri is controlled by Akuapim South Municipal District (ASMD). The main ethnic group is Akan, followed by Ewe.

It has Densu river acting as a border between itself and Nsawam. Densu River, is the main source of water for both domestic and industrial purposes for people in and around Nsawam and Adoagyiri.

== Education ==
The town is known for the Saint Martin's Secondary School. The school is a second cycle institution.
