= Awuah Panin III =

Ashanti Nana (born 1966)

- Nana
- Coronation: 2003
- Born: ~1966
- Occupation: Middle manager at an endoscopy company

Awuah Panin III, known in the United States as Harry Danso, is an Ashanti nana from the Asokwa area, which includes his hometown of Koforidua, Ghana. He lives in Worcester, Massachusetts, but visits his native country several times a year.

== Nana ==
He immigrated to the United States in 1985 and as of 2016 was a middle manager at an endoscopy company. When he left Ghana there were several other men ahead of him in line for the throne, but the title eventually fell upon him. He accepted it, but discourages his Ghanaian co-workers from using the title nana in the workplace.

== Personal life ==
Panin is involved with the New Juaben Association of New England, which sends X-ray machines, gloves, and syringes to a cash-strapped hospital in Ghana. He was named to Worcester’s Human Rights Commission in 2011. He has a college degree, is married, and has children.

== See also ==
- Otumfuo Nana Osei Tutu II
