= New Juaben North Municipal Assembly =

New Juaben North Municipal District
- Municipal District
- Districts of Eastern Region

- Location of New Juaben North Municipal District within Eastern
- Coordinates: 6°6′N 0°16′W
- Country: Ghana
- Region: Eastern
- Capital: Effiduase

Population (2021)
  - Total: 93,201
- Time zone: UTC+0 (GMT)

New Juaben North Municipal District is one of the thirty-three districts in Eastern Region, Ghana. Originally it was formerly part of the then-larger New Juaben Municipal District in 1988, until the northern part of the district was split off to create New Juaben North Municipal District on 15 March 2018; thus the remaining part has been renamed as New Juaben South Municipal District. The municipality is located in the central part of Eastern Region and has Effiduase as its capital town.
