= Tetegu =

Suburb of Accra, Ghana

- Country: Ghana
- Region: Greater Accra Region
- District: Weija-Gbawe Municipality

Tetegu is a community in the Weija-Gbawe Municipality of the Greater Accra Region of Ghana. The Densu River passes through Tetegu.

== Infrastructures ==
- Tetegu Police Station
- Tetegu Community-Based Health Planning and Services
