= Akuapim District =

- Former District Council
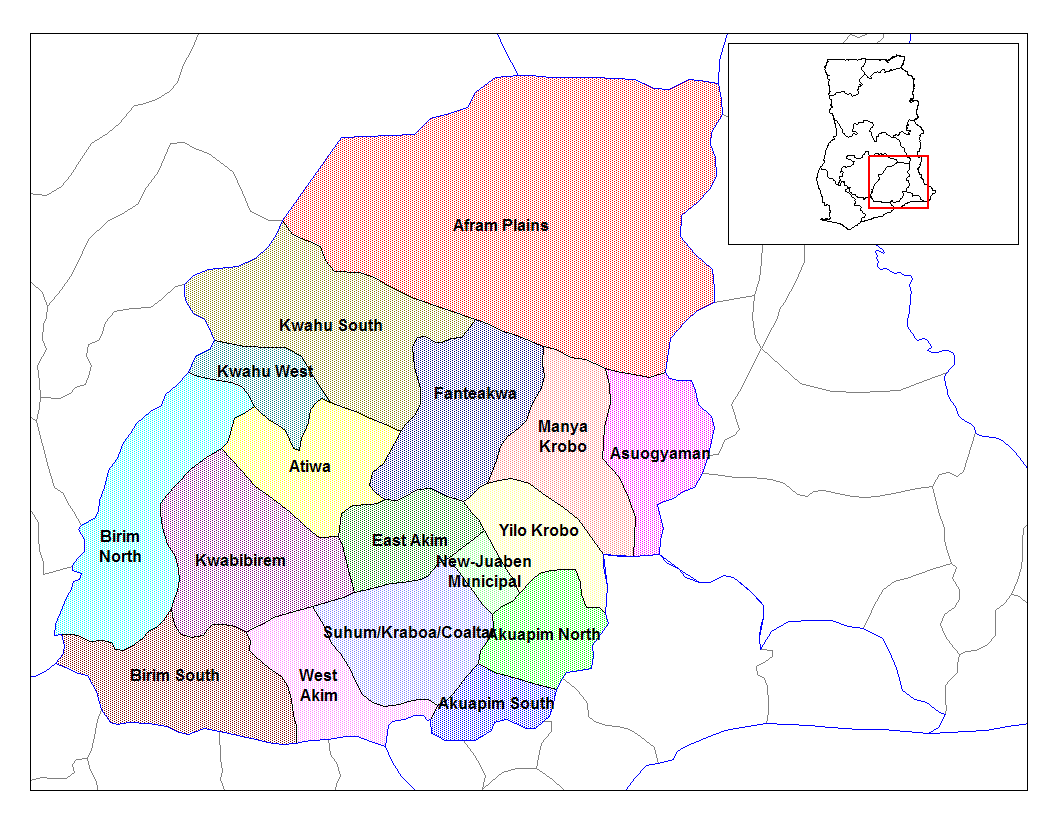
- Districts of Eastern Region

- Location of Akuapim District within Eastern
- Coordinates: 5°49′10.2″N 0°21′4.68″W
- Country: Ghana
- Region: Eastern
- Capital: Nsawam
- Time zone: UTC+0 (GMT)

Akuapim District is a former district council that was located in Eastern Region, Ghana. Originally created as an ordinary district assembly in 1975. However, on 10 March 1989, it was split off into two new district assemblies: Akuapim South District (capital: Nsawam) and Akuapim North District (capital: Akropong). The district assembly was located in the southeast part of Eastern Region and had Nsawam as its capital town.
