= Oyoko Methodist Senior High School =

High school in Koforidua, Ghana

Coordinates: 6.1433°N 0.2876°W

Location
- Tafo Road; Oyoko, Koforidua, New-Juaben Municipal District, Eastern Region; Ghana

Information
- School type: Public high school
- Established: 1989
- Grades: 9-12
- Website: www.omess.org

Oyoko Methodist Senior High School (abbreviated OMESS) is a high school located in Oyoko, Koforidua, Eastern Region of Ghana. It was established in 1989 as a successor of Oyoko Methodist Agricultural Secondary School (OMASS) and included to the public educational system in 1993.

The educational subjects are divided to 6 fields:

1. Agricultural science
2. Business
3. General arts
4. Pure science
5. Home economics
6. Visual arts

Students participate in various public activities including planting trees, in 2008 they planted about 1,500 seedlings of various tree species to mark the World Environment Day Celebration.

The school equipment is partly donated by various institutions and private donors, in November 2011 OMESS received 50 laptops from Ministry of Environment of Ghana.

In October 2013 OMESS won a quiz competition organized by Eastern Regional Directorate of National Health Insurance Authority in Koforidua.
