= Hiired tuules (album) =

2003 album by Dagö

Hiired Tuules

Studio album by Dagö
- Released: 2003
- Studio: Finnvox
- Genre: Folk rock
- Label: Hyper Records
- Producer: Lauri Saatpalu & Peeter Rabane (tracks 1–6 and 8–11), Holger Loduus (additional production on track 6), Jukka Immonen (track 7)

Dagö chronology
Toiduklubi (2002)	Hiired Tuules (2003)	Joonistatud mees (2006)

Hiired Tuules (The Mice In The Wind) is the third Dagö album, released in 2003.

== Track listing ==
1. Isaga draakonil (Riding A Dragon With Me And My Dad)
2. Teine Kadriorg (The Other Kadriorg)
3. Miisu (Kitty)
4. Silmalaud (Eyelids)
5. Öövalges (In The Silver Night)
6. Sinihabe (Bluebeard)
7. Vaadake paremat poolt (Look On The Bright Side)
8. Kabaree (The Cabaret)
9. Kaks takti ette (Star Search)
10. Ahmed
11. Hiired tuules (The Mice In The Wind)
