= Akaa Falls =

Pair of waterfalls in Ghana

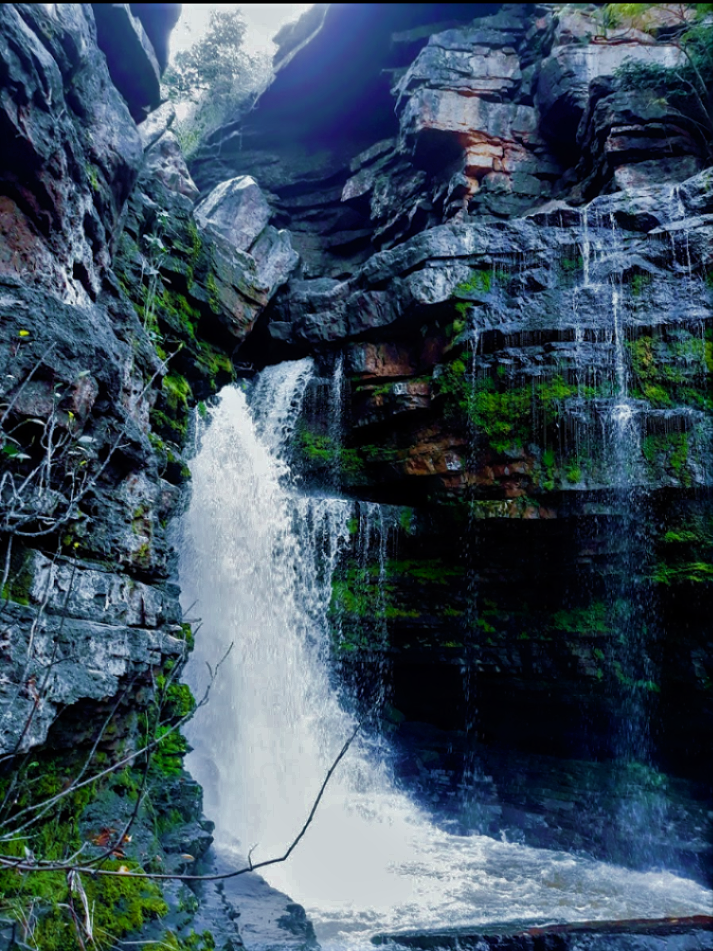

- Location within Ghana
- Location: Akaa, Akuapem North District, Eastern Region
- Coordinates: 6.17503°N 0.19614°W

The Akaa Falls is located near the Akyeremanteng village in the Akuapem North District, is about 21 kilometres northeast of Koforidua in the Eastern Region of Ghana. Akaa Falls is barely seven kilometres away from Boti Falls and takes it source from the Boti river, the very river from which the Boti Falls takes its source.

The Akaa Falls is a 60-meter cascade, surrounded by dense vegetation.

== See also ==
- Umbrella Rock
- List of waterfalls
