= Nsawam =

Town in Eastern Region, Ghana

- Town
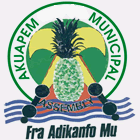
- Akuapim South Municipal District logo

- Location of Nsawam in Eastern Region, Ghana
- Coordinates: 05°48′00″N 00°21′00″W
- Country: Ghana
- Region: Eastern Region
- District: Nsawam-Adoagyire Municipal

Population (2013)
  - Total: 44,522
- Time zone: GMT
  - Summer (DST): GMT

Nsawam is a town in south Ghana and is the capital of the Nsawam-Adoagyire Municipal District, a district in the country's Eastern Region. The town's main ethnic group is Akan, followed by Ga and then Ewe. Nsawam is controlled by Nsawam-Adoagyire Municipal District (ASMD). As of 2013, Nsawam has a population of 44,522. Nsawam is situated on the main railway between Accra and Kumasi and the highway to Kumasi. The Densu River, which acts as a border between Nsawam and Adoagyiri, is the main source of water for both domestic and industrial purposes for people in Nsawam and its environs.

== Name ==
There are two other places in Ghana with the same name.

== Security Prison ==
Nsawam is the location of Nsawam Medium Security Prison.

== Education ==
=== Secondary education ===
Nsawam has two major secondary schools – St. Martins Secondary School and Nsawam Secondary School. Nsawam has several prominent junior high schools, Prince Boateng Memorial School, Nana Osae Djan and Perseverance school complex debatably being the most prominent among others such as Rev. Father Wieggers Roman Catholic school, Presby kindergarten, Primary & JHS. Ignis School, Anglican A & B Basic school, Jerisam International School, Nsawam Methodist BasicSchool,Royal Stars International School, Good foundation international school and Nsawam SDA JHS.

=== Higher education ===
Also situated in Nsawam are other schools, including Prince Boateng Memorial school, which runs from the nursery to senior high school and a vocational institute, in addition to BOPA College of Arts and Sciences, a private vocational school for young women where they learn sewing, catering and designing of clothing. In Nsawam there is also a Business Complex School dedicated to the grooming of Secretaries and entry-level business students. This school, Millennium Kings Academy, located on the Court Street, Nsawam, was established almost 30 years ago.

== Climate ==
Climate data for Nsawam
Month	Jan	Feb	Mar	Apr	May	Jun	Jul	Aug	Sep	Oct	Nov	Dec	Year
Mean daily maximum °C (°F)	32 (90)	32 (90)	32 (90)	32 (89)	31 (87)	29 (85)	28 (82)	28 (82)	28 (82)	30 (86)	32 (89)	31 (88)	32 (90)
Mean daily minimum °C (°F)	24 (75)	24 (75)	24 (76)	24 (76)	24 (75)	23 (73)	23 (73)	23 (73)	23 (73)	23 (73)	23 (73)	23 (73)	23 (73)
Average precipitation mm (inches)	7.6 (0.3)	25 (1.0)	25 (1.0)	100 (4.0)	150 (6.0)	150 (6.0)	76 (3.0)	25 (1.0)	76 (3.0)	76 (3.0)	25 (1.0)	5.1 (0.2)	750 (29.5)
Source: Myweather2.com

== Healthcare ==
The town of Nsawam is the most preferred hotspot for health care in the Nsawam-Adoagyire Municipal District as it houses the Nsawam Government Hospital, not far from the Nsawam Medium Security Prisons, New Life Hospital, Notre Dame Clinic all in Adoagyiri, and over five other recognised health centres

== Transport ==
=== Train and road ===
Nsawam is served indirectly by a railway station on the Ghana national railway network, which serves as a link between Accra and Kumasi.

Nsawam serves as the major business centre for most farming communities such as Pakro, Fotobi, Asiaw-Krom, Dobro, Nkyenekyene, Ahodjo, among others.

== See also ==
- Railway stations in Ghana
