= Joonistatud mees =

2003 album by Dagö

Joonistatud Mees

Studio album by Dagö
- Released: 2006
- Genre: Folk rock

Dagö chronology
Hiired tuules (2003)	Joonistatud Mees (2006)	Möödakarvapai (2008)

Joonistatud Mees (The Picture Perfect Man) is the fourth Dagö album, released in 2006.

== Track listing ==
1. Muusik (Singer)
2. Pöide
3. Näitleja (Actor)
4. Maantee (Highway)
5. Ma jään (I Will Be)
6. Hallid majad (Gray Houses)
7. Summer
8. Armastan sind kaugelt (I Love You From A Distance)
9. Joonistatud mees (The Picture Perfect Man)
10. Ma ei tea (I Don't Know)
11. Tõuseb traavile (On Horse's Back)
