= Ga South Municipal Assembly =

- Municipal Assembly
- Districts of Greater Accra Region

- Location of Ga South Municipal Assembly within Greater Accra
- Coordinates: 5°32′7.08″N 0°23′54.24″W
- Country: Ghana
- Region: Greater Accra
- Capital: Ngleshie Amanfro

Area
  - Total: 258 km^{2} (100 sq mi)

Population (2021 census)
  - Total: 350,121
  - Density: 1,360/km^{2} (3,510/sq mi)
- Time zone: UTC+0 (GMT)
- ISO 3166 code: GH-AA-GS

Ga South Municipal Assembly is one of the twenty-nine districts in Greater Accra Region, Ghana. Originally it was formerly part of the then-larger Ga West District in 2004, until the western part of the district was split off to create the first Ga South Municipal District on 29 February 2008, with Weija as its capital town; thus the remaining part was elevated to municipal district assembly status to become Ga West Municipal Assembly. Later, a small portion of the district was split off to create Ga Central Municipal District on 28 June 2012; thus the remaining part has been retained as Ga South Municipal District. However on 15 March 2018, the northern part of the district was split off to create a new Ga South Municipal District, with Ngleshie Amanfro as its capital town; thus the remaining part has been renamed as Weija-Gbawe Municipal District, with Weija as its capital town. The municipality is located in the western part of Greater Accra Region and has Ngleshie Amanfro as its capital town.
