= New Juaben South Municipal Assembly =

Municipal district in Eastern region, Ghana

New Juaben South Municipal District
- Municipal District
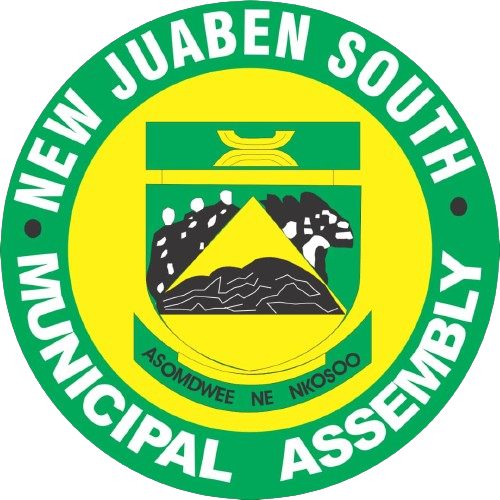
- Logo

- Districts of Eastern Region

- Location of New Juaben South Municipal District within Eastern
- Coordinates: 6°5′38.4″N 0°15′32.4″W
- Country: Ghana
- Region: Eastern
- Capital: Koforidua

Population (2021)
  - Total: 125,256
- Time zone: UTC+0 (GMT)

New Juaben South Municipal Assembly is one of the thirty-three districts in Eastern Region, Ghana. Originally it was formerly part of the then-larger New Juaben Municipal District in 1988 until the northern part of the district was split off to create the New Juaben North Municipal Assembly on 15 March 2018; thus the remaining part has been renamed as the New Juaben South Municipal Assembly. The municipality is located in the central part of the Eastern Region and has Koforidua as its capital town. The population of the Municipal Assembly according to 2021 population and housing census stands at 125,256 with 60,567 males and 64,689 females.

The New Juaben South Municipal District shares boundaries with the following assemblies: New Juaben North Municipal Assembly to the north, Akuapim North Municipal Assembly to the southeast, and Yilo Krobo Municipal Assembly to the east.
