= Boti Falls =

Pair of waterfalls in Ghana

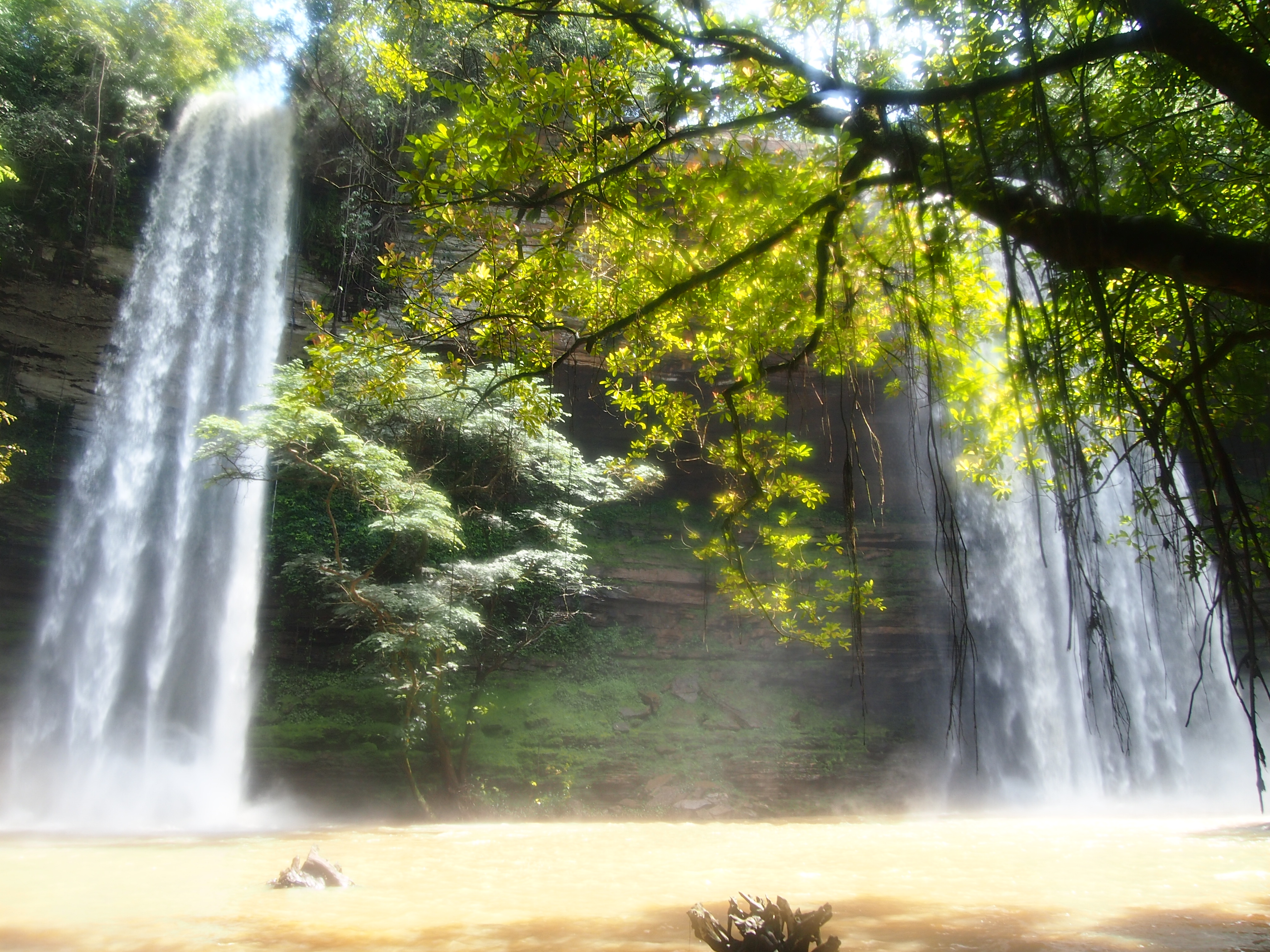
- The twin falls

- Location within Ghana
- Location: Boti, Yilo Krobo District, Eastern Region
- Coordinates: 6.19295°N 0.21875°W
- Total height: 30 metres (98 ft)

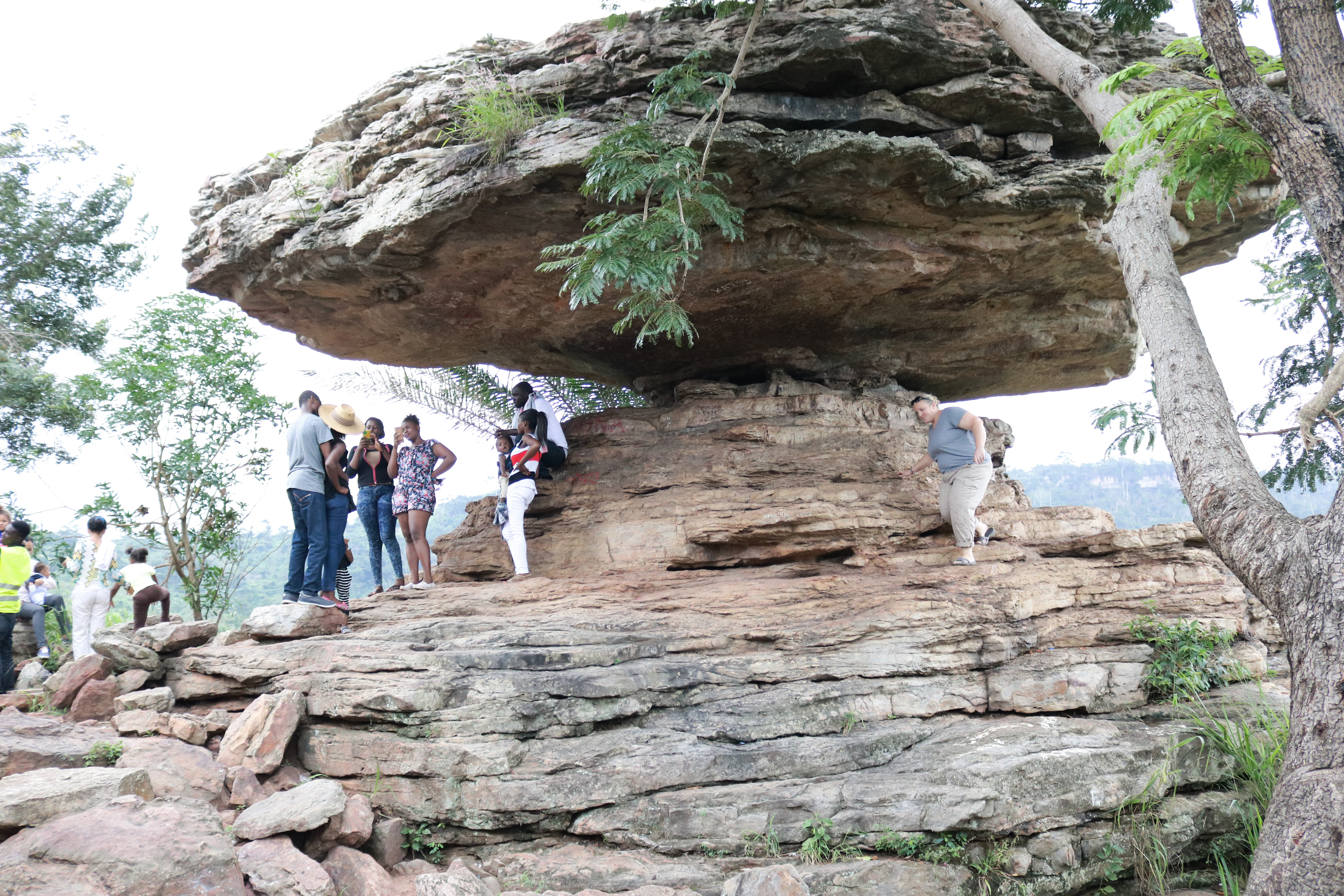
Umbrella rock at Boti falls

Boti Falls is a twin waterfall located at Boti in Yilo Krobo District in the Eastern Region of Ghana. These twin falls, which come from two rivers, are referred to as female and male; according to local myth, a rainbow is formed when they merge. Boti is a seasonal falls is a double side-by-side falls during the high flow and at the bottom of 250 concrete steps. During full flow you are surrounded in a canyon of falling water. It can be found in the forest of Huhunya. The larger one is mythically believed to be the male and the smaller one the female.

== Location ==
The falls are 17 km (11 mi) northeast of Koforidua, which is the eastern regional capital. It is just over 30 minutes drive from Koforidua, and more than 90 minutes from Accra, depending on the means of transportation.

Description

Boti Falls is a double waterfall that falls side by side separated by a small rocky bored. Some call it twins, and are believe to be a male and a female, which the bigger side is the male and the other small fall is a female.

The Boti Falls is 30 meters high from the ground level. The waterfalls find its source from Ponmpon River which runs through the Huhunya forest reserve. The waterfall runs through the mountainous rock into a pool of water at the ground. Many locals swim in the pool of water on the ground.

According to oral history from the Boti falls managers, Kingdom Ventures, the Boti falls was found in the forest by a white catholic priest surveying the area. In the 1960’s the waterfall was very famous, being visited by the first president of the Republic of Ghana, Dr. Kwame Nkrumah.

=== When to Visit ===
The peak flow of Boti Falls occurs during the rainy season from June to August, when the two waterfalls merge. The resulting spray frequently generates a rainbow, an event referred to by the local people as “a mating ceremony.”

It cost about GH₵ 100 to enter the Boti falls. This takes care of ones guided tour and hiking.

== See also ==
- Umbrella Rock
- Akaa Falls
- List of waterfalls
