= Dago, Ghana =

Dago Diego
- Village
- Location of Dago in Eastern Region
- Coordinates: 5°52′N 0°16′W
- Country: Ghana
- Region: Eastern Region
- District: Nsawam Adoagyire Municipal District
- Elevation: 397 ft (121 m)
- Time zone: GMT
  - Summer (DST): GMT

Dago is a village in the Nsawam Adoagyire Municipal district, a district in the Eastern Region of Ghana.
