= Dego =

Dego may refer to:

== People ==
- Baruch Dego (born 1982), Ethiopian-born Israeli football player
- David Dego (born 2001), Israeli football player
- Messay Dego (born 1986), Ethiopian-born Israeli football player

== Places ==
- Dego, Liguria, Italy
- Dego (mountain)

== Other ==
- French ship Dégo (1798)
