= Weija =

- District Capital
- Location in Ghana
- Coordinates: 5°34′N 0°20′W
- Country: Ghana
- Region: Greater Accra Region
- District: Ga South Municipal District
- Elevation: 20 ft (6 m)

Weija is a small town and is the capital of Ga South Municipal District, a district in the Greater Accra Region of Ghana. Weija has become a hotspot for economic activity because of the ultra modern shopping center, the West Hills Mall, which has been built there.
