= Dagö (band) =

Estonian musical group

- Origin: Estonia
- Genres: Folk rock
- Years active: 1998–2008, 2010–present
- Members: Lauri Saatpalu; Peeter Rebane; Raul Vaigla; Taavi Kerikmäe; Toomas Rull; Michael Gallagher; Petteri Hasa
- Past members: Tiit Kikas
- Website: Official website

Dagö is a folk rock band from Tallinn, Estonia.

Dagö was formed in 1998 by Lauri Saatpalu, Peeter Rebane and Tiit Kikas. Dagö is the old name of Hiiumaa, an Estonian island. The band's first album, Dagö, was released in 2000, and received the Folk/Ethno Album Of The Year award in Estonia. Toomas Rull (drums) and Raul Vaigla (bass) joined the band soon after. In 2001, Dagö won first prize in the Midsummer Night’s Improvisational Festival in Pärnu. Tiit Kikas left the group in 2002, and producer and musician Kristo Kotkas became the “invisible member” of the band. The second album, Toiduklubi (Food Club), was released in the same year, and Taavi Kerikmäe, a keyboard player, joined the band soon after. Their third album, Hiired Tuules (Mice in the Wind), was released in 2003, and in the same year drummer Petteri Hasa also joined the band. The fourth album, Joonistatud mees (The Picture Perfect Man), was released in 2006. Also in 2006, the band were awarded the folk rock Group Of The Year award in Estonia. The fifth album, Möödakarvapai (Smoothing Caress), was released in 2008, and soon after, the band announced that they were disbanding. In autumn 2010 the band started recording again, with new members, and in March 2011 they released their sixth studio album, Plaan Delta.

In the autumn of 2010, Dagö started working in the studio again and the new album "Plan Delta", recorded with a new line-up, was released in March 2011. The official presentation concert of the album took place on April 10 at Nokia Concert Hall. In the summer of 2011, an all-Estonian tour "Plan D: Music with Eggs" took place together with Bonzo and Tõun, during which 9 concerts were given: in Türi (July 22), Pärnu (July 23), Haapsalu (July 24), Pirita (July 26), Rakvere (July 27), Tartu (July 28), Võru-Kubija (July 29), Kuressaare (July 30) and Rapla (July 31).

In the spring of 2020, Dagö's seventh studio album "Heating" was released.

== Members ==
- Lauri Saatpalu (vocals)
- Peeter Rebane (guitar)
- Raul Vaigla (bass)
- Taavi Kerikmäe (keyboards)
- Toomas Rull (drums)
- Petteri Hasa (drums)

== Albums ==
- 2000: Dagö
- 2002: Toiduklubi
- 2003: Hiired tuules
- 2006: Joonistatud mees
- 2008: Möödakarvapai
- 2011: Plaan Delta
- 2020: Küte
