= Ngleshie Amanfro =

Town in Greater Accra Region, Ghana

- Town
- Location of Ngleshie Amanfro in Greater Accra Region
- Country: Ghana
- Region: Greater Accra Region
- District: Ga South Municipality

Population
  - Total: —
- Time zone: GMT
  - Summer (DST): GMT

Ngleshie Amanfro (also called Ngleshie Amanfrom) is a town near Kasoa located in the Ga South Municipality of the Greater Accra Region in Ghana. It is along the Accra-Cape Coast road. As at 2023, the Assembly Member of the community is Mr Pursues Amadum Kwashie. As at 2023, the Queen mother of the town is Nana Tambia IV.

Ngleshie Amanfro Senior High School is located in the town.
