= Pampanso =

- Village
- Location of Pampanso in Eastern Region
- Coordinates: 5°53′N 0°21′W
- Country: Ghana
- Region: Eastern Region
- District: Nsawam Adoagyire Municipal District
- Elevation: 240 ft (73 m)

Population (2013)
  - Total: —
- Time zone: GMT
  - Summer (DST): GMT

Pampanso is a village in the Nsawam Adoagyire Municipal district, a district in the Eastern Region of Ghana.
