= Oyoko, Koforidua =

Oyoko
- Village
- Location in Ghana
- Coordinates: 6°06′N 0°16′W
- Country: Ghana
- Region: Eastern
- District: New-Juaben
- Time zone: GMT
  - Summer (DST): GMT
- Area code: 034

Oyoko is a small community in the New-Juaben Municipal District of the Eastern Region of Ghana. It lies 4 km north from Koforidua, the regional capital.

In the New-Juaben Municipal District list of settlements Oyoko has number 20.

== Notable places ==
The municipality contains several schools; the best known is Oyoko Methodist Senior High School, which is included in the List of schools in Ghana.

There is also the Oyoko Chiefs Palace which serves as the residence of the Chief of Oyoko.

== See also ==
- Koforidua
