= Pakro =

- Village
- Location of Pakro in Eastern Region
- Coordinates: 5°54′N 0°19′W
- Country: Ghana
- Region: Eastern Region
- District: Akuapim South Municipal
- Elevation: 260 ft (80 m)

Population (2013)
  - Total: —
- Time zone: GMT
  - Summer (DST): GMT

Pakro is a village in the Akuapim South Municipal district, a district in the Eastern Region of Ghana.
