= Akuapim South District =

District in Eastern Region, Ghana

- District
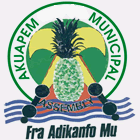
- Seal

- Districts of Eastern Region

- Location of Okere District within Eastern
- Coordinates: 5°50′50.28″N 0°10′30″W
- Country: Ghana
- Region: Eastern
- Capital: Adukrom

Area
  - Total: 229.4 km^{2} (88.6 sq mi)

Population (2021)
  - Total: 76,922
- Time zone: UTC+0 (GMT)

Akuapim South District is one of the thirty-three districts in Eastern Region, Ghana. Originally it was formerly part of the then-larger and first Akuapim South District in 1988, which it was created from the former Akuapim District Council; until it was elevated to municipal district assembly status to become Akuapim South Municipal District, with Nsawam as its capital town. However on 6 February 2012, the northeast part of the district was split off to create a new Akuapim South District, with Aburi as its capital town; thus the remaining part has been renamed as Nsawam Adoagyire Municipal District, with Nsawam as its capital town. The district assembly is located in the southeast part of Eastern Region and has Aburi as its capital town.
