= Dagö (album) =

2000 album by Dagö

Studio album by Dagö
- Released: 2000
- Recorded: 1999–2000
- Studio: Music Island Studios
- Genre: Folk rock
- Label: Hyper Elwood
- Producer: Teet Kehlmann

Dagö chronology
Dagö (2000)	Toiduklubi (2002)

Dagö is the first album by the Estonian band Dagö, released in 2000.

== Track listing ==
1. "Šveits" – 4:02
2. "Armastuslaul" – 3:10
3. "24.02.00" – 3:41
4. "Moedem" – 3:26
5. "Hei tuul" – 4:05
6. "Härra Sannikov" – 3:51
7. "Kuula, kuula" – 4:30
8. "Mõnikord ei vea" – 3:57
9. "Mööda" – 4:03
10. "Hallid päevad" – 3:38
11. "Tuuletallajad" – 3:47
12. "Cindy" – 4:06
13. "Aeg on maas" – 2:37
14. "Väikene mees" – 3:09
