= Koforidua-Effiduase =

Effiduase
- Urban area
- Country: Ghana
- Region: Eastern Region
- District: New Juaben North Municipal District
- Time zone: GMT
  - Summer (DST): GMT

Effiduase is a town in the New Juaben North Municipal District of the Eastern Region of Ghana.
