= Amasaman =

- District Capital
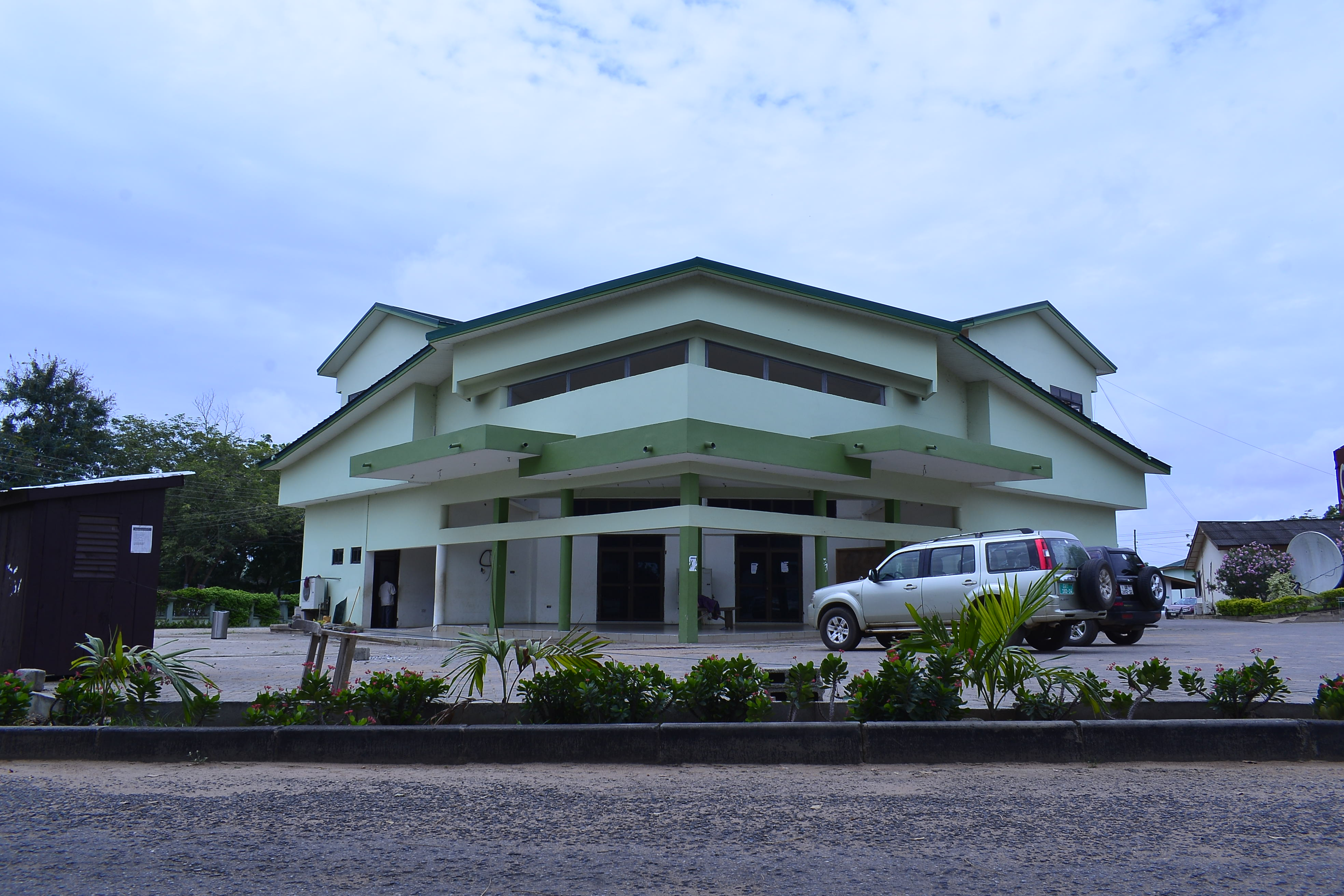
- This is Amasaman Municipal Assembly Hall building in the Ga West of the Greater Accra of Ghana.

- Location in Ghana
- Coordinates: 5°42′N 0°18′W
- Country: Ghana
- Region: Greater Accra Region
- District: Ga West Municipal District
- Elevation: 200 ft (61 m)

Amasama is a small town and is the capital of Ga West Municipal District, an MMDA located within the Greater Accra Region of Ghana. The town is known for the Amasama Secondary Technical School. The school is a second cycle institution.
