= Umbrella Rock =

Geological site in Ghana

Coordinates: 6°10′56.244″N 0°13′18.66″W

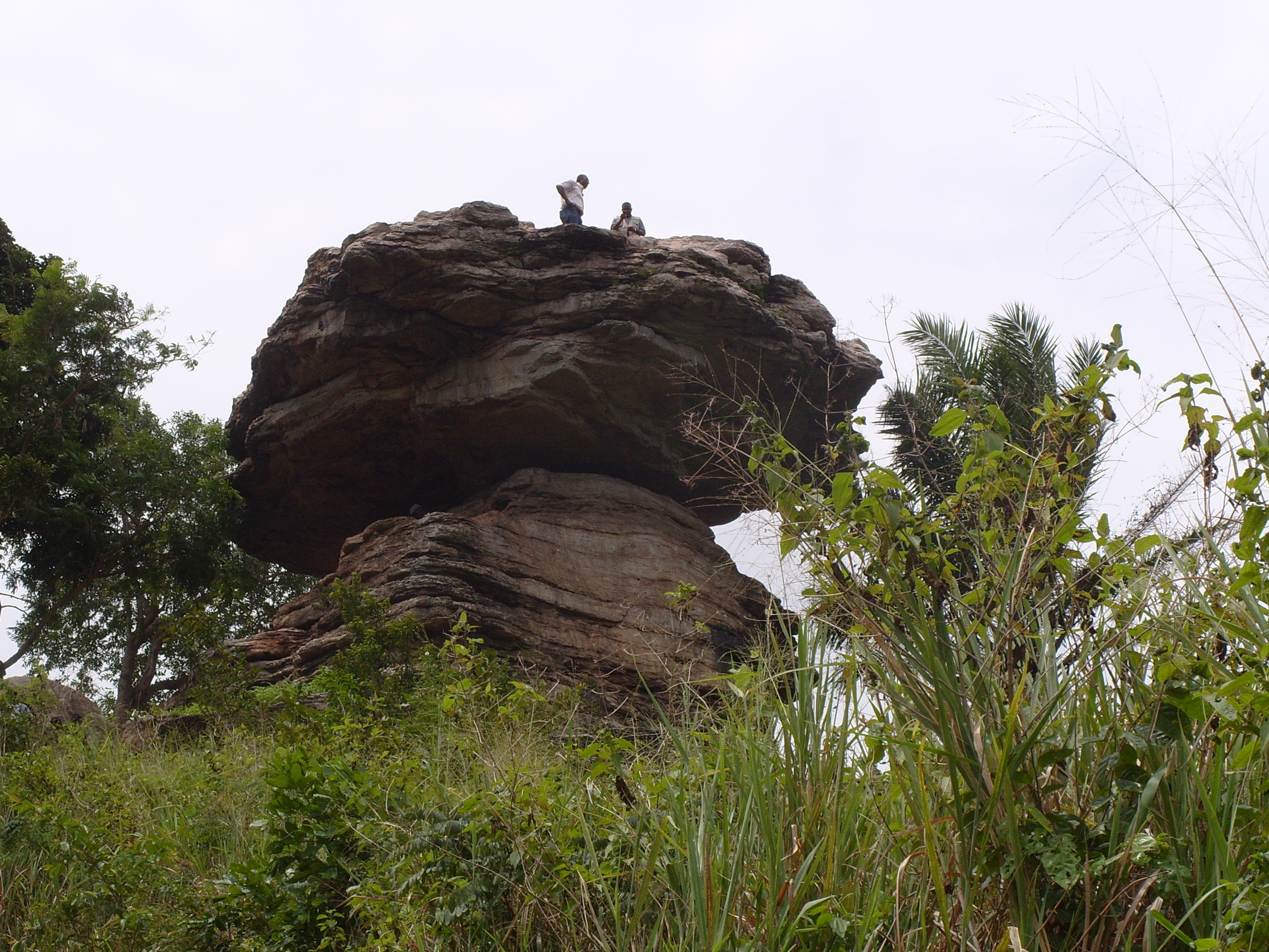
Umbrella Rock, Koforidua, Ghana

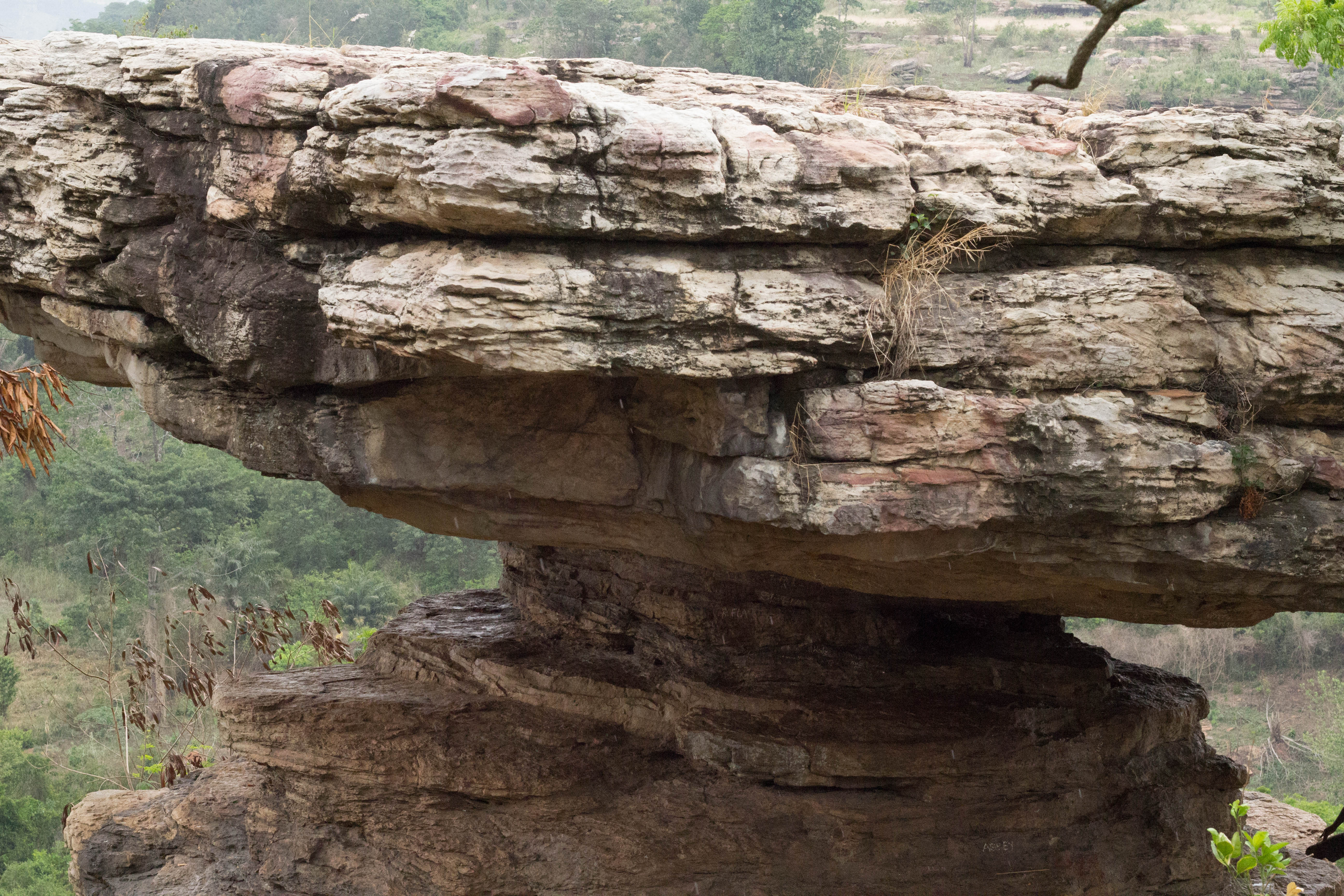
Umbrella Rock, 2004

The Umbrella Rock is a mysterious rock located just about seven kilometres close to the Boti Falls in the Yilo Krobo District, Ghana, hence tourists who visit Boti Falls usually take advantage to pass by and experience the mystery of nature of the rock. The Umbrella rock is one of the main tourist attractions in the country's Eastern Region. As the name implies, Umbrella Rock has an overhang on the top large enough to cover 12 to 15 people at once.

Yearly, many tourists travel to Boti Falls for its natural beauty, and the umbrella rock is visible through much of the trek to the falls.

== See also ==
- List of individual rocks
