= Koforidua =

- City
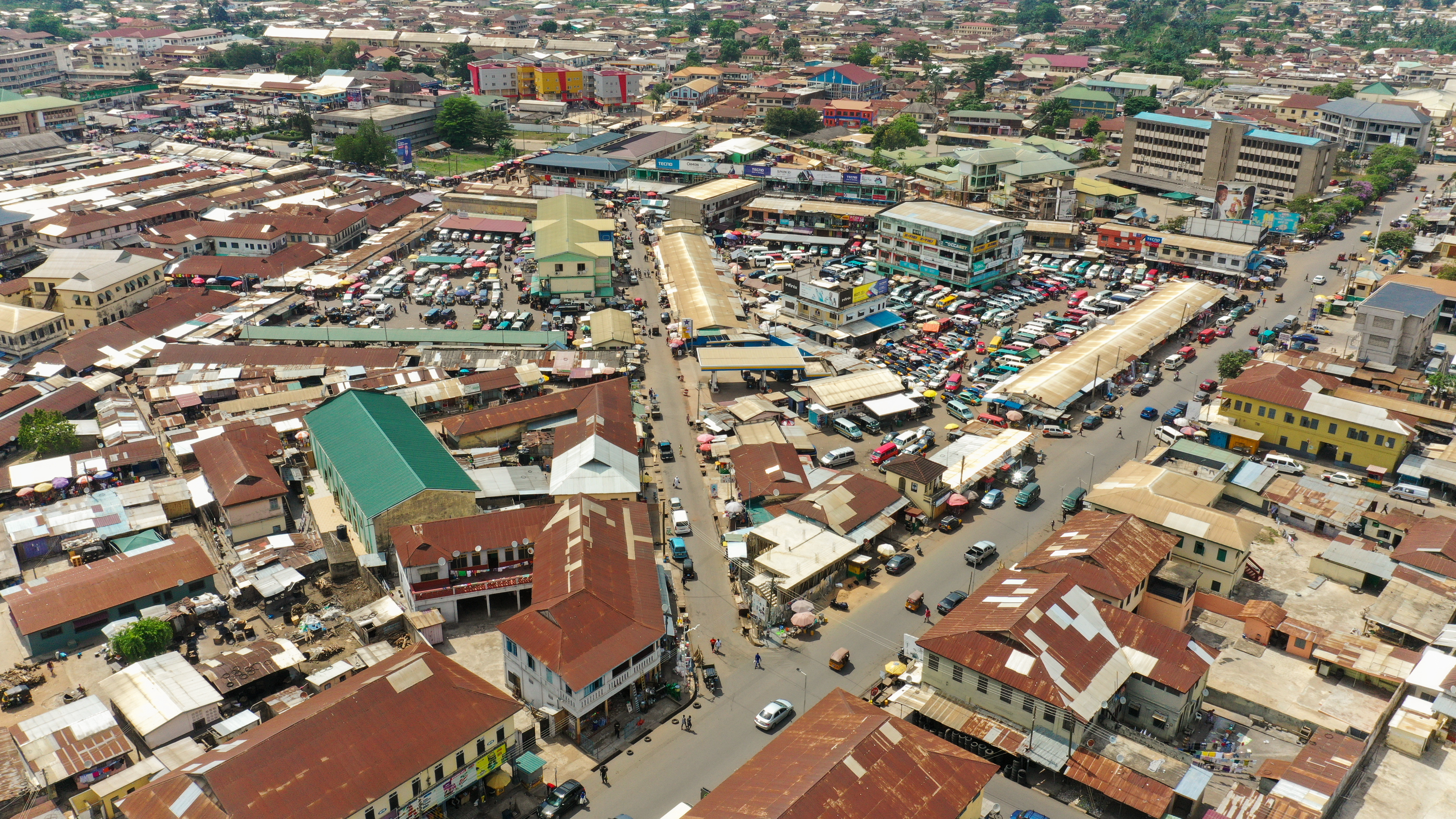
- View of Koforidua and central market

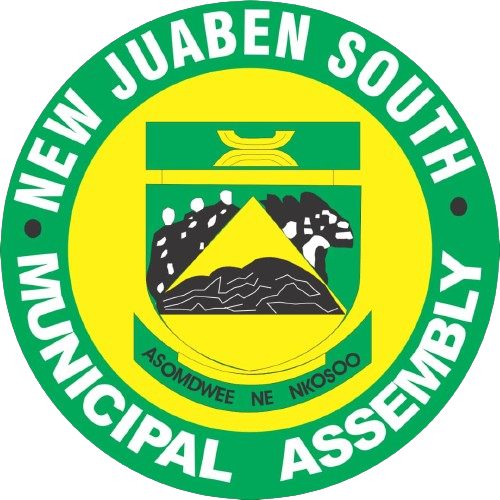
- New Juaben South Municipal District
- Nickname: Kofcity
- Location of Koforidua in Eastern region, Ghana
- Coordinates: 6°06′N 0°16′W
- Country: Ghana
- Region: Eastern Region
- District: New Juaben South Municipal District
- Settled: 1875
- Elevation: 238 m (781 ft)

Population (2012)
  - Total: 183,727
- Time zone: GMT
  - Summer (DST): GMT
- Area code: 034

Koforidua, also popularly known as K.dua or Koftown is a city and the capital of the Eastern Region of Ghana. The city has an estimated population of 151,255 people as of 2025. The city is a blend of colonial and modern architecture.

Koforidua serves as the commercial centre for the Eastern region. The city is home to many businesses, with the exception of heavy-duty industries. The city is home to Intravenous Infusions Limited, one of the oldest pharmaceutical companies in West Africa. The recent construction of the four-lane highway road linking the Koforidua Technical University and Koforidua to Oyoko brings commerce to the city. The highway also serves as a valid alternative route to reach Kumasi. Koforidua today is a multi-ethnic city with people from various ethnic groups in Ghana calling the city their home.

On 6th March 2024, Koforidua played host to the celebration of the 67th anniversary of the independence of Ghana.

== Etymology ==
Based on oral tradition, the city owes its name to an Akan man named Kofi Ofori, who had built his hut under a huge mahogany tree. This tree provided shelter for weary farmers who were returning from their farms. Over time, it became common for the farmers to say that they were going to rest under Kofi Ofori's tree. In their local language, Twi, the word for 'tree' is 'dua'. The combination of Ofori's name and tree becomes 'Koforidua'.

== History ==
Koforidua was founded in 1875 by Akan migrants from Asanteman. The completion of the Kumasi railway in 1923 saw Koforidua becoming an important road and rail junction. Koforidua is one of the country's oldest cocoa-producing centres. It is also noted today for its weekly Thursday bead market, which draws bead buyers and sellers from all over the Eastern region.

The moniker "Koforidua Flowers" has firmly entrenched itself and is likely to endure, even though some older individuals have attempted to explain that the name originated from the abundant flowers spanning the stretch between Akwadum and Koforidua as one approached the city. However, the prevailing and widely accepted perspective contradicts this.

This figurative name has been in circulation since the 1950s. As recounted by certain elderly residents of the city, the name finds its roots in the allure of the women who migrated to the city during the turn of the century for trading endeavours. Many of these women chose to make the city their permanent home, effectively becoming part of the local population. Primarily in their late teens and early twenties, they were predominantly hailing from areas like Krobo and Akyem, with a notable contingent also originating from the Kwahu mountains. Koforidua, during that era, held a significant status as a trading hub, hosting numerous lively events every week, and therefore, was home to a substantial female population.

=== Legend ===
According to legend, the Obuotabiri mountain, found in New Juabeng, both north and south districts, was the home to the gods who protected the people. It was believed to be inhabited by dwarfs and thus was considered to be the soul of the area.

== Geography ==
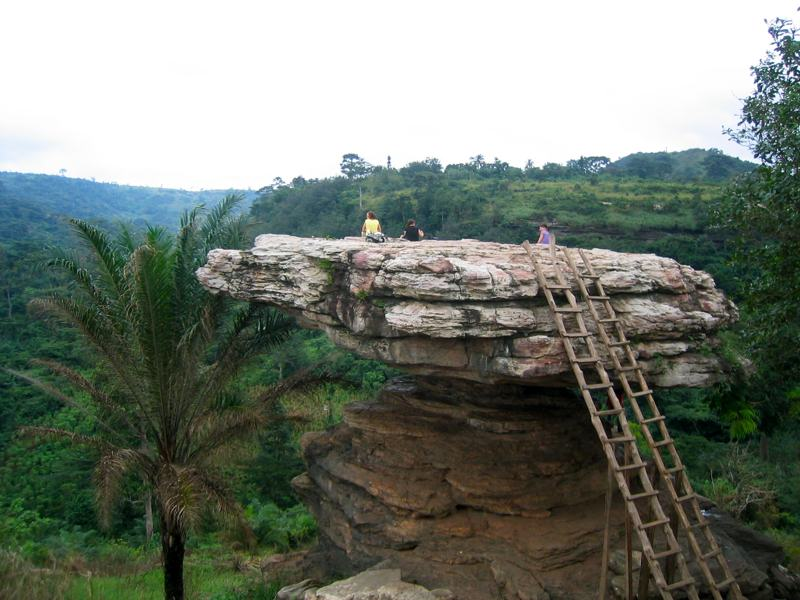
Umbrella Rock near Koforidua

The New Juaben Municipality falls within the Eastern Region of Southern Ghana. The municipality covers an estimated area of 110 square kilometres, constituting 0.57% of the total land area of the Eastern Region. The municipality has 48 electoral areas.

The New Juaben municipality shares boundaries with East Akim Municipality to the northeast, Akwapim North District to the east and south, and Suhum-Kraboa-Coaltar District to the west. The city of Koforidua (New Juabeng) is made up of several neighbourhoods and settlements, including Effiduase, Asokore, Oyoko, Jumapo, Suhyen, Dansuagya, Betom, and Srodae. Koforidua is two hours by road from Accra.

== Climate ==
The city is located in the heart of the Dahomey Gap, resulting in it having a tropical savanna climate (Köppen Aw). The weather is hot and humid year-round, but significant rainfall is usually only seen between April and June, although in wetter years September and October also will see substantial falls.

Climate data for Koforidua (1991–2020)
Month	Jan	Feb	Mar	Apr	May	Jun	Jul	Aug	Sep	Oct	Nov	Dec	Year
Record high °C (°F)	38.3 (100.9)	39.5 (103.1)	39.5 (103.1)	38.2 (100.8)	36.5 (97.7)	34.6 (94.3)	33.5 (92.3)	34.5 (94.1)	34.5 (94.1)	34.9 (94.8)	36.1 (97.0)	37.6 (99.7)	39.5 (103.1)
Mean daily maximum °C (°F)	34.0 (93.2)	35.1 (95.2)	34.5 (94.1)	33.8 (92.8)	32.7 (90.9)	30.8 (87.4)	29.4 (84.9)	29.3 (84.7)	30.5 (86.9)	31.9 (89.4)	32.9 (91.2)	33.2 (91.8)	32.3 (90.1)
Daily mean °C (°F)	27.6 (81.7)	28.9 (84.0)	28.8 (83.8)	28.6 (83.5)	27.8 (82.0)	26.7 (80.1)	25.9 (78.6)	25.6 (78.1)	26.5 (79.7)	27.2 (81.0)	27.7 (81.9)	27.6 (81.7)	27.4 (81.3)
Mean daily minimum °C (°F)	21.0 (69.8)	22.7 (72.9)	23.2 (73.8)	23.4 (74.1)	23.0 (73.4)	22.7 (72.9)	22.3 (72.1)	21.9 (71.4)	22.4 (72.3)	22.5 (72.5)	22.4 (72.3)	21.9 (71.4)	22.4 (72.3)
Record low °C (°F)	12.9 (55.2)	14.9 (58.8)	14.4 (57.9)	19.5 (67.1)	19.7 (67.5)	19.5 (67.1)	18.6 (65.5)	17.2 (63.0)	19.5 (67.1)	19.0 (66.2)	17.6 (63.7)	12.6 (54.7)	12.6 (54.7)
Average precipitation mm (inches)	27.1 (1.07)	57.4 (2.26)	115.6 (4.55)	133.6 (5.26)	167.4 (6.59)	196.6 (7.74)	109.6 (4.31)	73.2 (2.88)	144.7 (5.70)	162.1 (6.38)	74.2 (2.92)	30.3 (1.19)	1,291.8 (50.86)
Average precipitation days (≥ 1.0 mm)	2.3	4.7	8.3	8.4	10.9	11.9	9.4	8.3	11.9	13.2	7.6	3.1	100.0
Mean monthly sunshine hours	192.3	185.7	202.1	209.4	207.7	152.1	119.4	104.0	128.8	198.9	221.3	219.7	2,141.4
Source: NOAA

== Demographics ==
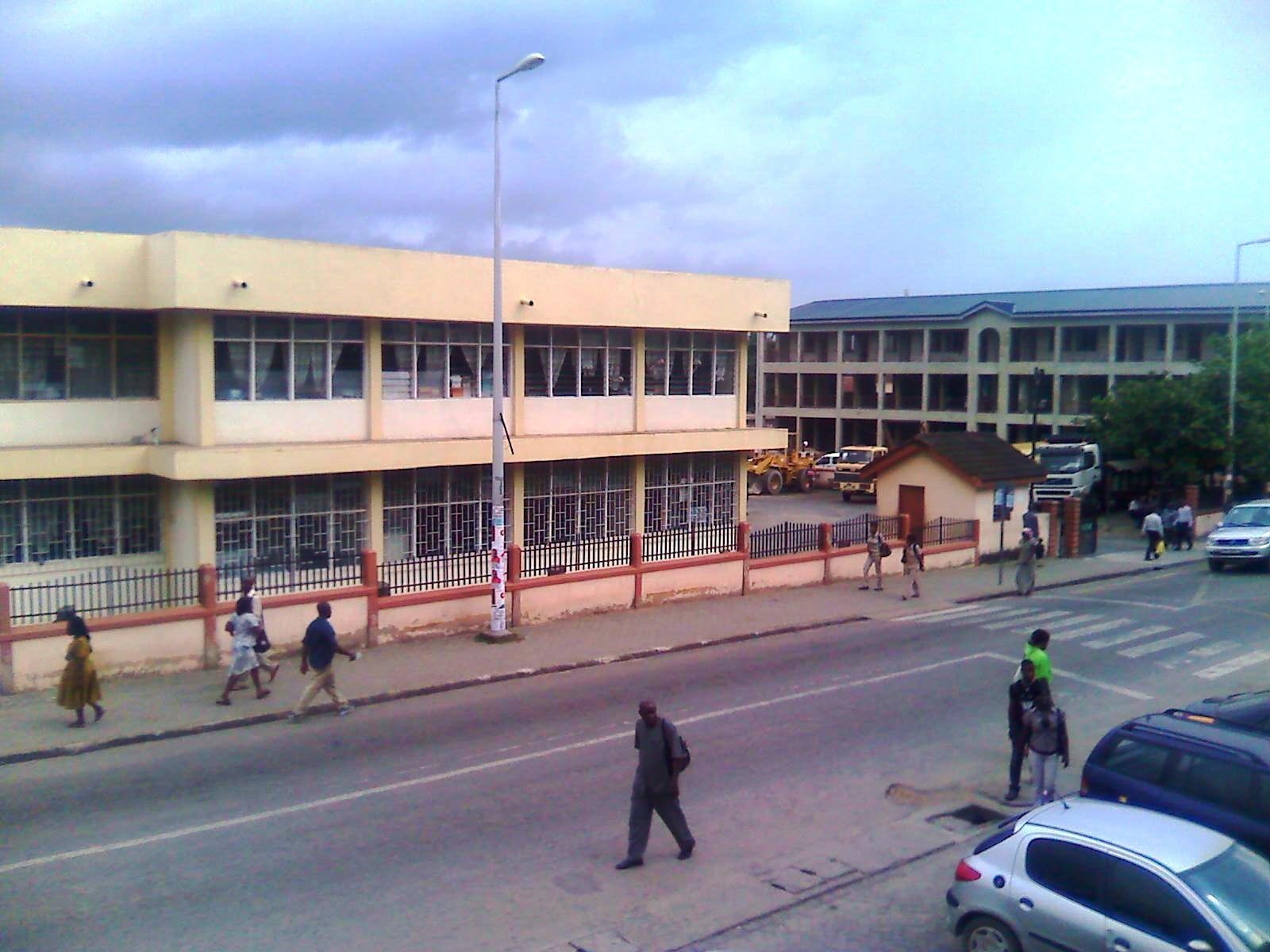
Main Street in Koforidua

Presently the city's population is 127,334 people and is dominated by Akans. The 'Akwantukese' (The Big Journey Festival) is celebrated yearly to mark the movement of the inhabitants of Koforidua's ancestors from 'Asanteman' to their present location of Koforidua.

== Economy ==
=== Industries ===
The city is home to one of Ghana's oldest pharmaceutical manufacturing companies, i.e., Intravenous Infusion Ltd, which manufactures drips and injections for the West African market. Other industrial activities of Koforidua include textiles, crafts, soap, carpentry and joinery, traditional medicine, pottery and ceramics, and the production of alcoholic and non-alcoholic beverages.

=== Financial services ===
Koforidua is also home to many financial services companies, ranging from universal banks, microfinance, rural banks and savings and loans companies to insurance companies.

=== Agriculture ===
The city currently depends mainly on government administration, retailing, hospitality, commercial and education services. With inhabitants in the Cornubations (outskirt surrounding communities) engaging in some form of subsistence farming.

=== Cocoa production ===
Koforidua produces cocoa. However, as cocoa production has moved westward to the Ashanti Region and Brong-Ahafo Region areas of virgin soil, Koforidua has become increasingly dependent upon its commercial and business administrative functions. The city of Koforidua has only small- to medium-scale industries today.

=== Market ===
Koforidua accommodates several markets within its township, encompassing the Central Market, Agatha Market (also referred to as the Farmer's Market), Effiduase Market, Adweso Market, and the Zongo Market, among several other small markets. Koforidua, characterised by its Akan majority population, fits into this classification by designating Mondays and Thursdays as market days. On these particular days, the municipality experiences a temporary halt as individuals converge from both distant and nearby locales to purchase essential groceries.

The focal point of this bustling activity is the Agartha Market, a satellite marketplace situated to the south of the Eastern Regional Coordinating Council (ERCC) vicinity, along the route leading to the Old Estate community.

== Natural landmarks ==
Theora Video of the Waterfall and Tourist attraction (Boti falls) in the Suburbs of Koforidua in the Eastern region of Ghana.

Koforidua is close to predominant tourism attractions such as Obuo Tabri Mountain, Akosombo Dam (which holds Lake Volta, the world's largest man-made lake), Akaa Falls, Boti Falls, and the Umbrella Rock.

== Education ==
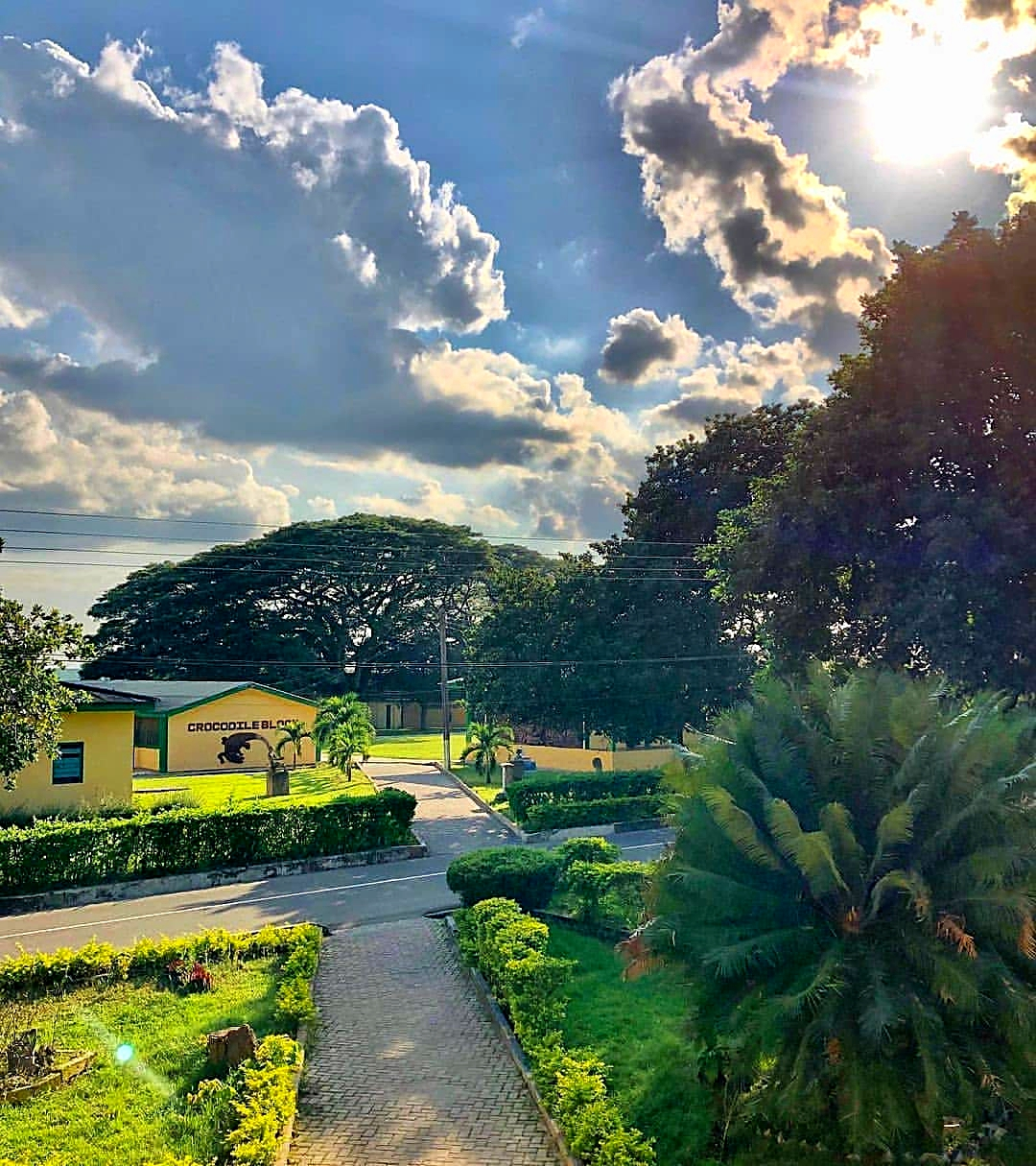
Ghana Senior High School, Koforidua

Koforidua is a major hub of education, not just in the region but in the country as a whole. Pope John Senior High School and Minor Seminary was ranked 9th of the over 200 senior high schools in Ghana. The city is home to the Koforidua Technical University, All Nations University and Ghana Telecom University College. The city is also home to a couple of notable high schools. High schools in Koforidua include:

- Koforidua Secondary Technical Senior High School (K.S.T.S)
- Pope John Senior High and Junior Seminary
- Oti Boateng Senior High School
- Pentecost Senior High School
- Ghana Senior High School
- New Juabeng Senior High School
- SDA Senior High School
- Oyoko Methodist Senior High School

The schools listed have been consistent in representing the municipality and the region at large in the famous annual National Science and Maths Quiz.

== See also ==
- Railway stations in Ghana
- Aburi Botanical Gardens
- Awuah Panin III
