= Densu River =

River in Ghana

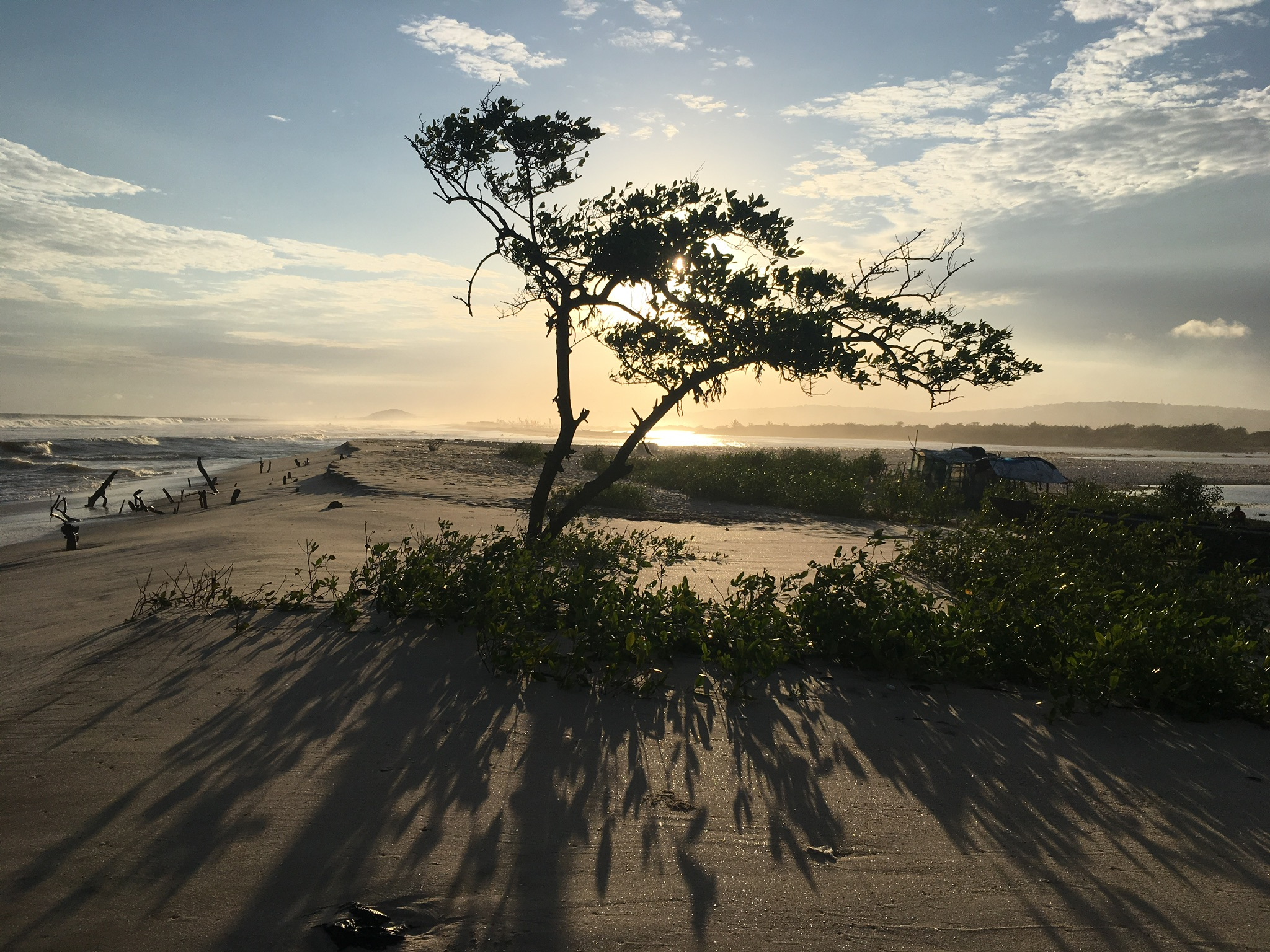

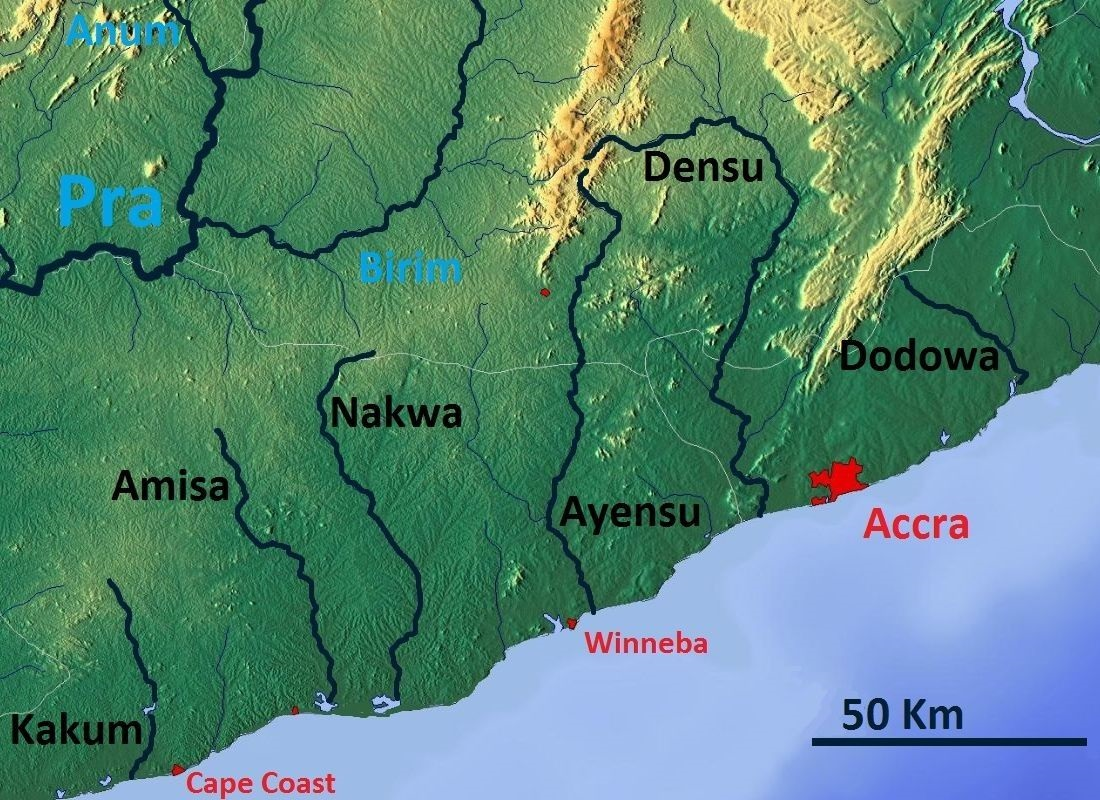

Location
- Country: Ghana

Physical characteristics
- Mouth: Atlantic Ocean
  - coordinates: 5°31′0″N 0°19′0″W
- Length: 116 km (72 mi)
- Basin size: 2,490 km^{2} (960 sq mi)
- Discharge
  - location: Mouth

Designations

Ramsar Wetland
- Official name: Densu Delta Ramsar Site
- Designated: 14 August 1992
- Reference no.: 564

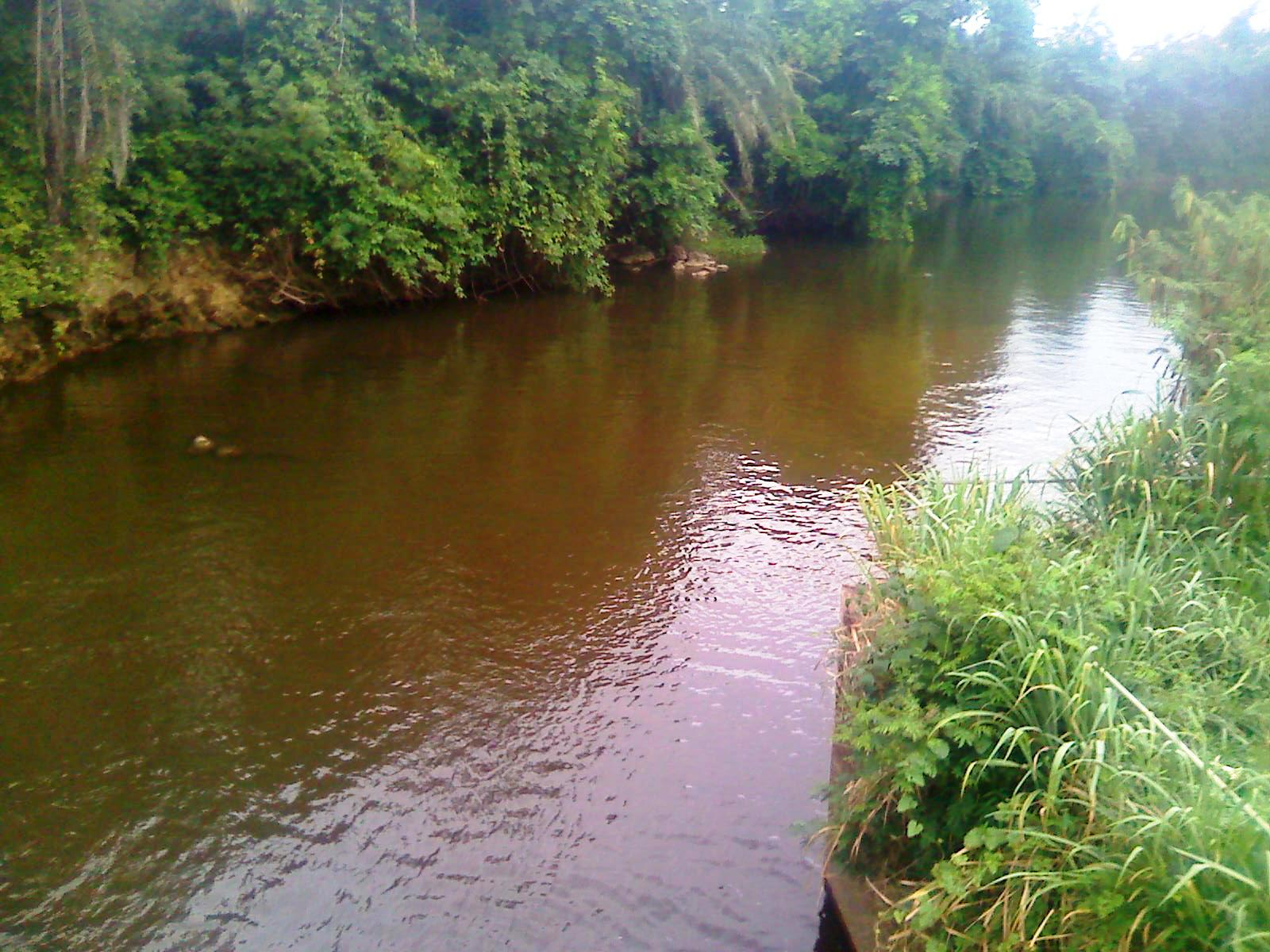
Estuary

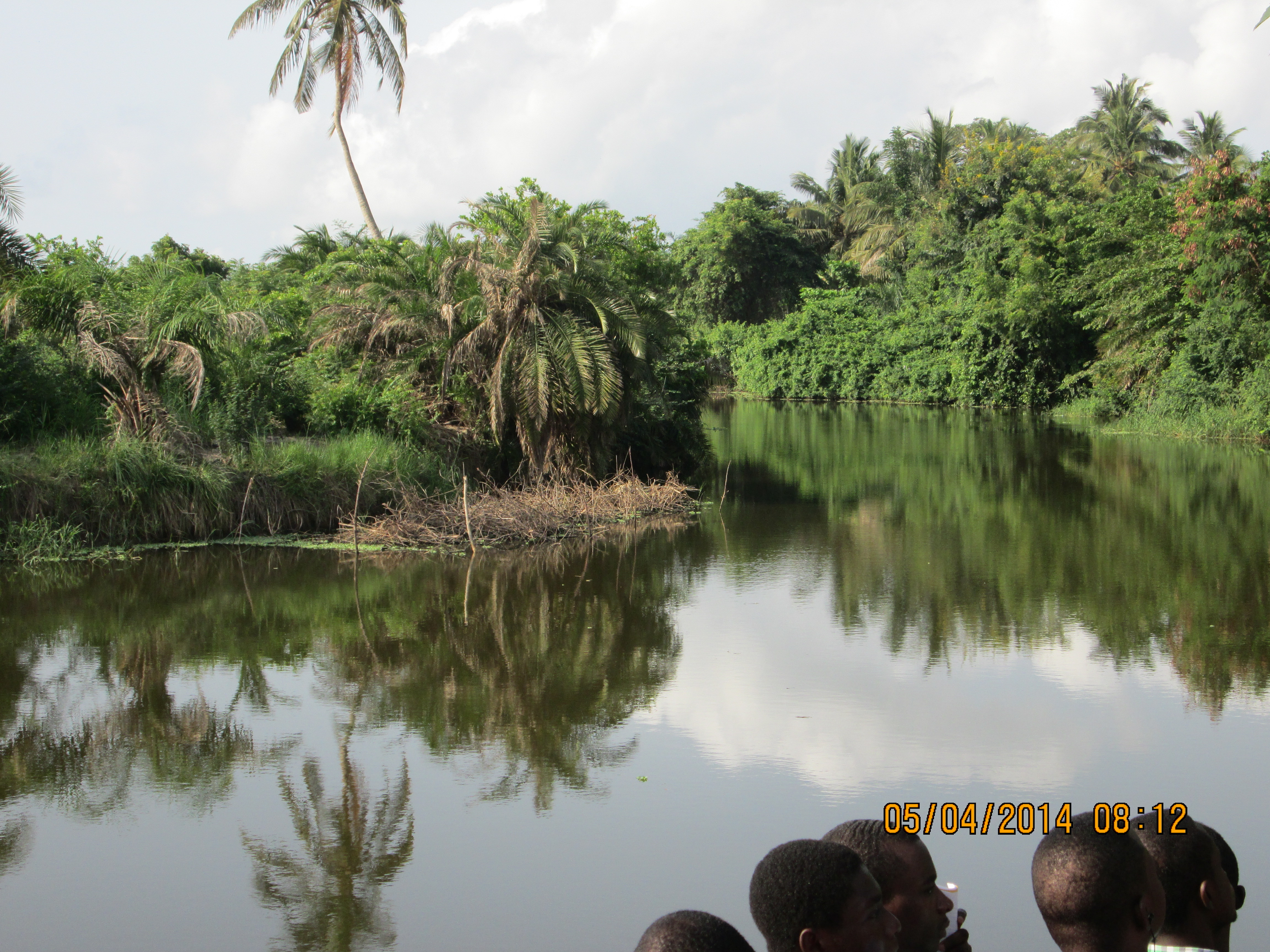
Meander

The Densu River is a 116km long river in Ghana rising in the Atewa Range. It flows through an economically important agricultural region, supplies half the drinking water to Ghana's capital city of Accra. The river ends in an ecologically significant wetland delta on the coast of the Atlantic Ocean. The Densuano Dam and Weija Dam are situated on the Densu River.

== Geography ==
The Densu River is located in southern Ghana and is part of the Coastal River Basin system. Its catchment area is approximately 2,490–2,600 km², spanning parts of the Eastern (72%), Central (5%), and Greater Accra(23%) Regions.The river originates from the Atewa-Atwiredu Range, a forested highland area that serves as a major hydrological source for several Ghanaian rivers.The river ultimately discharges into the Gulf of Guinea through a wetland system known as the Densu Delta, which is influenced by tidal and lagoon dynamics.

== Ecological Importance ==
The lower part of the river forms the Densu Delta Ramsar Site, a wetland of international importance designated in 1992. The site covers approximately 5,893 hectares and includes lagoons, mangroves, salt pans, and marsh ecosystems. It has also been identified as an Important Bird Area (IBA) by BirdLife International because it supports significant populations of non-breeding and wintering waterbirds, especially terns, including western reef egrets, spotted redshanks, and little, black, roseate, common, Sandwich and royal terns.The wetland plays a critical ecological role as a natural flood buffer, sediment trap, and coastal stabilizer, protecting surrounding communities from erosion and storm surges.

== Hydrology and Tributaries ==
The Densu River system is fed by several tributaries, including streams such as the Nsaki, Dobro, Kuia, Adaiso, and Pompon rivers, which contribute to its seasonal flow variability.

Hydrologically, the basin experiences a bi-modal rainfall pattern, leading to seasonal fluctuations in discharge. The northern portion of the basin is more humid and forested, while the southern portion is relatively dry and urbanized.

The river is also regulated by major hydraulic infrastructure, including the Weija Dam, which plays a key role in water storage and supply for metropolitan Accra.

== Economic and Social Importance ==
The Densu River is one of the most important freshwater sources for Ghana's capital city, Accra, supplying a significant proportion of treated drinking water through the Weija Water Treatment Plant. The Weija Dam on the river serves as the primary source of water in the Greater Accra Region. The dam supplies 80 percent of the potable water used by the entire Region.

The basin supports major agricultural activities, including irrigation farming and livestock production, particularly in rural and peri-urban areas.

Additionally, communities along the lower basin depend on the river and its wetlands for fishing, salt production, and small-scale commerce, especially within the delta region.

== Threats ==
The population density of the Densu Basin is approximately 240 persons per square kilometre. Part of the Densu River has become a dumping site by some residents in the area, causing water pollution. Other activities include farming, sand mining and quarrying.

== In popular culture ==
- Ghanaian artist Kojo Antwi named his second studio album, released in 2002, after the river.
- Osibisa, an Afrobeat band, composed a song titled Densu, explaining about the different varieties of fishes and the song the fishermen sing.

== See also ==
- Volta River (Ghana)
- Atewa Range Forest Reserve
- Weija Dam
- Ramsar Convention
