= Adomako =

Adomako or Adomakoh is an Akan language surname with Ashanti origins. Notable people with this surname include:

- Albert Adomakoh (1922–2016), Ghanaian economist, former governor of the Bank of Ghana
- Alex Adomako-Mensah (born 1962), Ghanaian politician, member of the Parliament of Ghana
- Daniel Adomako (born 1979), Ghanaian sprinter
- Daniel Adomako (musician) (born 1991), Ghanaian-Italian Artiste, winner of Italia's Got Talent - 4
- Evans Adomako (born 1997), Ghanaian professional footballer

The name is also used in the following contexts:

- R v Adomako, a 1994 House of Lords case on gross negligence manslaughter
