= ABii National =

Ghanaian financial institution

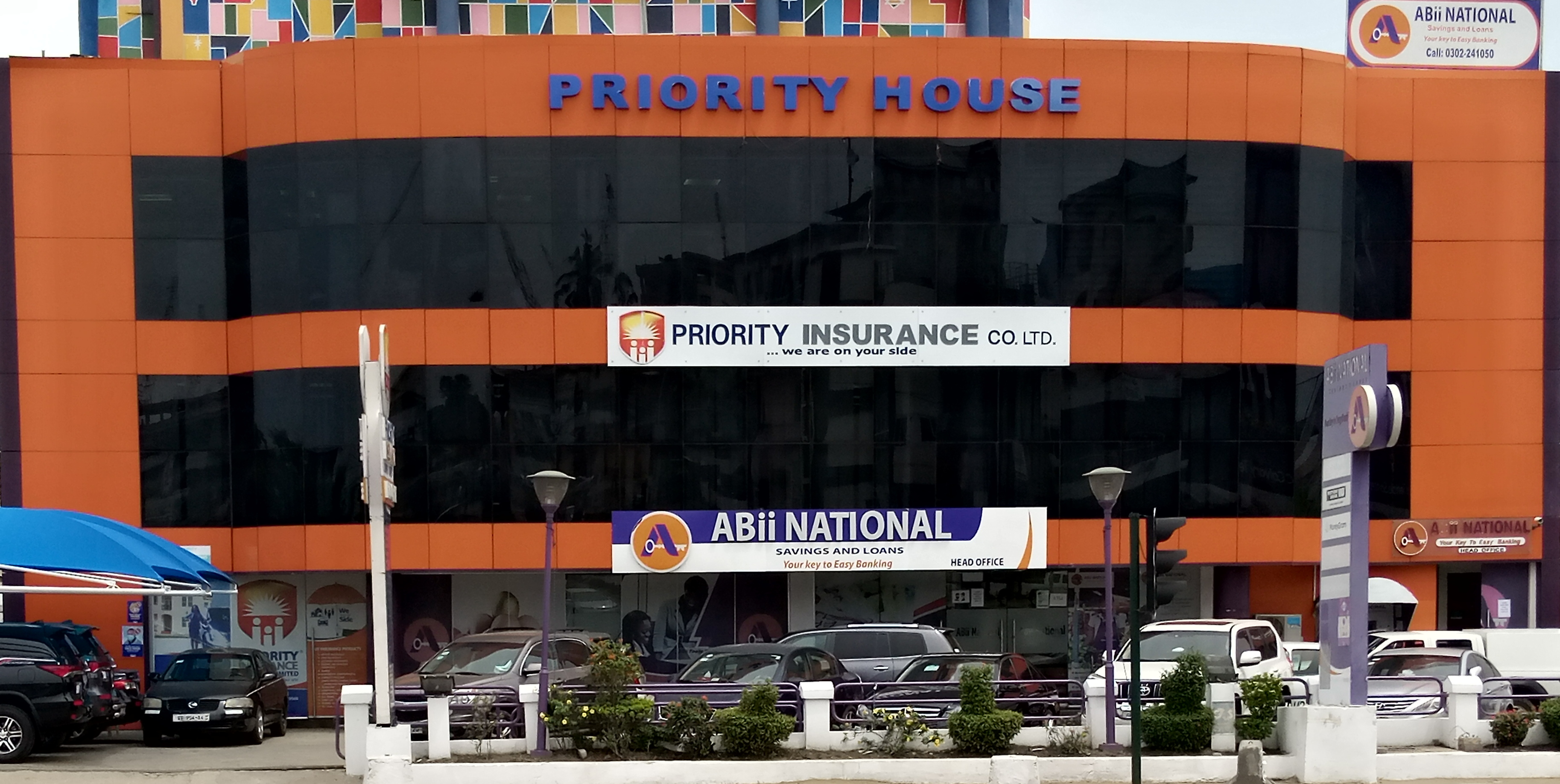
- ABii National
- Type: Subsidiary
- Industry: Savings and Loans Company
- Founded: 2011; 15 years ago
- Headquarters: Accra, Ghana
- Number of locations: 7 (2015)
- Number of employees: <10,000 (2015)
- Parent: Tobinco
- Website: abiinational.net

ABii National is a Savings and Loans Company in Ghana that provides financial service to the general public.

ABii National was established as a Savings and Loans company, as defined in Ghanaian law, in 2011. In February 2013, the Bank of Ghana granted the company a provisional license as a bank and in September of that year this was converted into a full license. By that time, it had six branches. A seventh branch was opened at Takoradi in March 2015, by which time the company had nearly 10,000 customers.

Based in Accra, the company is a subsidiary of Tobinco.
