= Ministry of Finance and Economic Planning (Ghana) =

Government ministry of Ghana

Ministry of Finance and Economic Planning, Ghana

Agency overview
- Formed: 1957
- Jurisdiction: Republic of Ghana
- Headquarters: Ghana
- Minister responsible: Hon. Cassiel Ato Forson
- Website: Official website

The Ministry of Finance and Economic Planning is the government ministry responsible for the economic and monetary health of Ghana. The Ministry is involved with economic planning, fiscal policy, national accounting, the national budget, and creating an environment for investment and growth.

The main offices of the Ministry are located in Accra.

== History ==
Komla Agbeli Gbedemah was the first Finance Minister of independent Ghana under Kwame Nkrumah between 1954 and 1961.

== The Budget ==
Ahead of Ghana's budget presentation on March 11, 2025, a government official emphasized the importance of accuracy and consistency in presenting the country's economic data. He cautioned Finance Minister Dr. Ato Forson against manipulating economic figures for political gain, stressing that Ghana's economic record should be based on data from institutions like the Bank of Ghana and the Ghana Statistical Service. He warned that presenting an overly optimistic or distorted view of the economy could scare investors away and damage the country's credibility.¹

== E-levy ==
The Electronic Levy (E-levy), was introduced in 2022 with a 1.75% rate on all transactions. It is set to be abolished by the government. This move is expected to boost mobile money usage, promote financial inclusion, and enhance business operations for mobile money service providers. Ghana ranked as the best in the world for Mobile Money regulation according to the 2024 GSMA Mobile Money Regulatory Index, is anticipated to see increased mobile money transactions, encouraged digital payment systems, and expanded access to financial services following the E-levy's removal.

== Departments and agencies ==
The following are government agencies of the Ministry:

- Financial Intelligence Center
- Institute of Accountancy Training
- Ghana Revenue Authority (GRA)
- Controller and Accountant General's Department
- Public Procurement Authority (PPA)
- Ghana Infrastructure Investment Fund

The Ministry has the oversight responsibilities with regard to:

- Bank of Ghana (BOG)
- National Lotteries Authority (NLA)
- Public Procurement Board (PPB)
- Ghana Cocoa Board (Cocobod)
- Revenue Agencies Governing Board (RAGB)

Divisions under the ministry include:

- Advisor(s)
- Budget
- Debt Management
- Economic Research & Forecasting
- External Economic Relations
- Financial Sector
- General Administration
- Information and Communication Technology (ICT) Directorate
- Internal Audit
- Legal
- Public Investment
- Real Sector

== List of ministers ==
The first Ghanaian to head this ministry is Komla Agbeli Gbedemah who assumed this position in 1954 when the Britain allowed Kwame Nkrumah to form a government prior to gaining full independence in 1957. The Ministry has at various times been designated as Ministry of Finance or as it is currently, the Ministry of Finance and Economic Planning.

Number	Minister	Took office	Left office	Government	Party
1	Komla Agbeli Gbedemah (MP) (First Ghanaian in this position)	1954	1957	Colonial government	Convention People's Party
1	Komla Agbeli Gbedemah (MP) (First Ghanaian in this position)	1957	1961	Nkrumah government	Convention People's Party
2	Ferdinand Koblavi Dra Goka (MP)	1961	1964	Nkrumah government	Convention People's Party
3	Kwesi Amoako-Atta (MP)	1964	1966	Nkrumah government	Convention People's Party
4	Akwasi Afrifa; Emmanuel Noi Omaboe	1966	1969	National Liberation Council	Military government
5	Joseph Henry Mensah (MP)	1969	1972	Busia government	Progress Party (Ghana)
6	Ignatius Kutu Acheampong	1972	?	National Redemption Council	Military government
7	Amon Nikoi	?	?	National Redemption Council	Military government
8	Robert K. A. Gardiner	14 October 1975	May 1978	Supreme Military Council (Ghana)	Military government
9	J. L. S. Abbey	?	1979	Supreme Military Council (Ghana)	Military government
9	J. L. S. Abbey	1979	1979	Armed Forces Revolutionary Council	Military government
10	Amon Nikoi	1979	1981	Limann government	People's National Party
11	George Benneh	May 1981	December 1981	Limann government	People's National Party
12	Kwesi Botchwey	1982	1993	Provisional National Defence Council	Military government
12	Kwesi Botchwey	1993	1995	Rawlings government	National Democratic Congress
13	Richard Kwame Peprah	1995	2001	Rawlings government	National Democratic Congress
14	Yaw Osafo-Maafo	2001	2005	Kufuor government	New Patriotic Party
15	Kwadwo Baah Wiredu	2005	2007	Kufuor government	New Patriotic Party
16	Anthony Akoto Osei	2007	2009	Kufuor government	New Patriotic Party
17	Kwabena Duffuor	2009	2012	Mills government	National Democratic Congress
17	Kwabena Duffuor	2012	2013	Mahama government	National Democratic Congress
18	Seth Terkper	2013	6 January 2017	Mahama government	National Democratic Congress
19	Ken Ofori-Atta	27 January 2017	14 February 2024	Akufo-Addo government	New Patriotic Party
20	Mohammed Amin Adam	14 February 2024	6 January 2025	Akufo-Addo government	New Patriotic Party
21	Cassiel Ato Forson	January 2025	Incumbent	Maham's 2nd government	National Democratic Congress

== See also ==
- Controller and Accountant General (Ghana)
- Economy of Ghana
- Government of Ghana
