= Nashiru Issahaku =

Ghanaian governance expert and governor of Bank of Ghana

Dr. Nashiru Issahaku
- In office 1 Apr 2016 – 31 March 2017
- Preceded by: Dr Henry kofi Wampah
- Succeeded by: Dr. Ernest Addison

Governor of The Bank of Ghana

Personal details
- Born: Tamale, Ghana
- Education: University of Georgia, Maharishi University of Management
- Occupation: Economist

Abdul-Nashiru Issahaku is a Ghanaian governance expert, economist, and former Governor of the Bank of Ghana (BoG).

== Career ==
Issahaku's work experience includes Chief Executive Officer (CEO) of the Export Development and Agricultural Investment Fund (EDAIF) and a position at the World Bank.

=== Bank of Ghana ===
The Central Bank of Ghana should have two deputy governors but when then Governor Kwesi Beko Amissah-Arthur was made Vice President of Ghana Henry Kofi Wampah was promoted to acting governor, and the bank had to work with only one deputy governor in eight months from July 2012 to April 2013, when Issahaku was appointed. Prior to his appointment by John Mahama in April 2016, Issahaku was the Second Deputy Governor with Millison Kwadwo Narh as the First Deputy Governor since 2013.

== Resignation from Bank of Ghana ==
Dr. Issahaku announced his resignation on 29 March 2017, which took effect on 31 March 2017. He was succeeded by Dr. Ernest Addison.
