= Hubert Kessels =

Hubert C. Kessels was an economist and a governor of the Bank of Ghana. He served as governor of the bank from 21 August 1959 to 8 September 1962.

Government offices
Preceded by Alfred Eggleston	Governor of Bank of Ghana; 1959–1962	Succeeded by W.M.Q. Halm
