= Nsano =

Ghanaian Fintech company

Nsano Limited
- Industry: Financial services
- Founded: 2013; 13 years ago
- Headquarters: Accra, Ghana
- Key people: Priscilla Hazel (CEO), Kofi Owusu-Nhyira (Founder and Executive Chairman)
- Products: payment processor, mobile money aggregator, remittance etc.
- Website: www.nsano.com

Nsano Limited is a Ghanaian Fintech company founded in 2013 headquartered in Accra, Ghana but in other African countries including Ivory Coast, Zambia and Uganda. Nsano facilitates the termination of financial payments in about 15 African markets as they push financial inclusion.

== History ==
Nsano is one of the first Ghanaian Fintech companies to receive the Payment Service Provider (Enhanced) License from the Bank of Ghana in 2021. Nsano is currently headquartered in Ghana. In 2019 they set up a fraud management center and got awarded their ISO 27001:2013 certificate.

In 2019 they were awarded a grant of $250,000 as part of the Remittance Grant Facility challenge.

In March 2023 Nsano celebrated 10 years of its existence as a Fintech Company. Nsano created a platform to help customer secure mobile money payments helping fight fraud.

In January 2025 Nsano announced Priscilla Hazel as their new CEO who will take over from former CEO and Founder Kofi Owusu-Nhyira.

Nsano has partnered with Arab Financial Services (AFS) to transform the payment ecosystem by connecting mobile money and card payments through the combined technology and expertise of both companies.

They also have been received the Payment Aggregation and Payment Remittances Service Licenses (Category II and III) by the National Bank of Rwanda. This follows them setting up an office in Rwanda.

== Awards and recognition ==
- Excellence Award in Team Building & Engagement at the HR Professionals Summit & Awards.
- The founder and Chairman of Nsano Kofi Owusu-Nhyira was named among 2024 Bloomberg New Economy Catalyst list.
