= Gloria Amon Nikoi =

Former Ghana Foreign Minister

19th Minister for Foreign Affairs
- In office June 26, 1979 – September 24, 1979
- Preceded by: Colonel Roger Felli
- Succeeded by: Dr. Isaac K. Chinebuah

Personal details
- Born: 6 June 1927 Ghana
- Died: 10 November 2010 (aged 83) Washington, D.C.
- Spouse: Amon Nikoi (m. 1959)
- Education: Achimota College
- Occupation: Diplomat

Gloria Adwoa Amon Nikoi, née Addae (6 June 1927 – 10 November 2010) was a Ghanaian diplomat who served as the Foreign Minister in 1979 under the Armed Forces Revolutionary Council (AFRC) government. She was the first Ghanaian woman to hold this position.

== Career ==
She attended Achimota College. Nikoi was the Deputy Chief of Mission to the United Nations from 1969 to 1974. Gloria Nikoi later worked as a senior official in the Ghanaian Ministry of Foreign Affairs.

After the military coup of June 4, 1979, which overthrew the Supreme Military Council government, she was made foreign minister for about four months in the Armed Forces Revolutionary Council (AFRC) government of Flight lieutenant Jerry Rawlings. This ended on September 24, 1979, when the Third Republic under Dr. Hilla Limann's People's National Party government was inaugurated.

Gloria Nikoi became the Chairperson of the erstwhile Bank for Housing and Construction, a Ghanaian bank, in 1981. She had also been a director of the African Development Bank (AfDB). She became the first Chairperson of the Council of the Ghana Stock Exchange when it was inaugurated on November 12, 1990.

== Personal life ==
She was married to Amon Nikoi, a former Governor of the Bank of Ghana and Finance minister, with whom she had three children.

== Death and funeral ==
She died of natural causes in Washington, D.C., on 10 November 2010 at the age of 83. Her funeral service was held at the Accra Ridge Church, where she was a congregant.

== See also ==
- Minister for Foreign Affairs (Ghana)

Political offices
Preceded by Colonel Roger Felli	Foreign Minister; 1979	Succeeded by Dr. Isaac K. Chinebuah
