= The Bank Square =

Headquarters of the Bank of Ghana

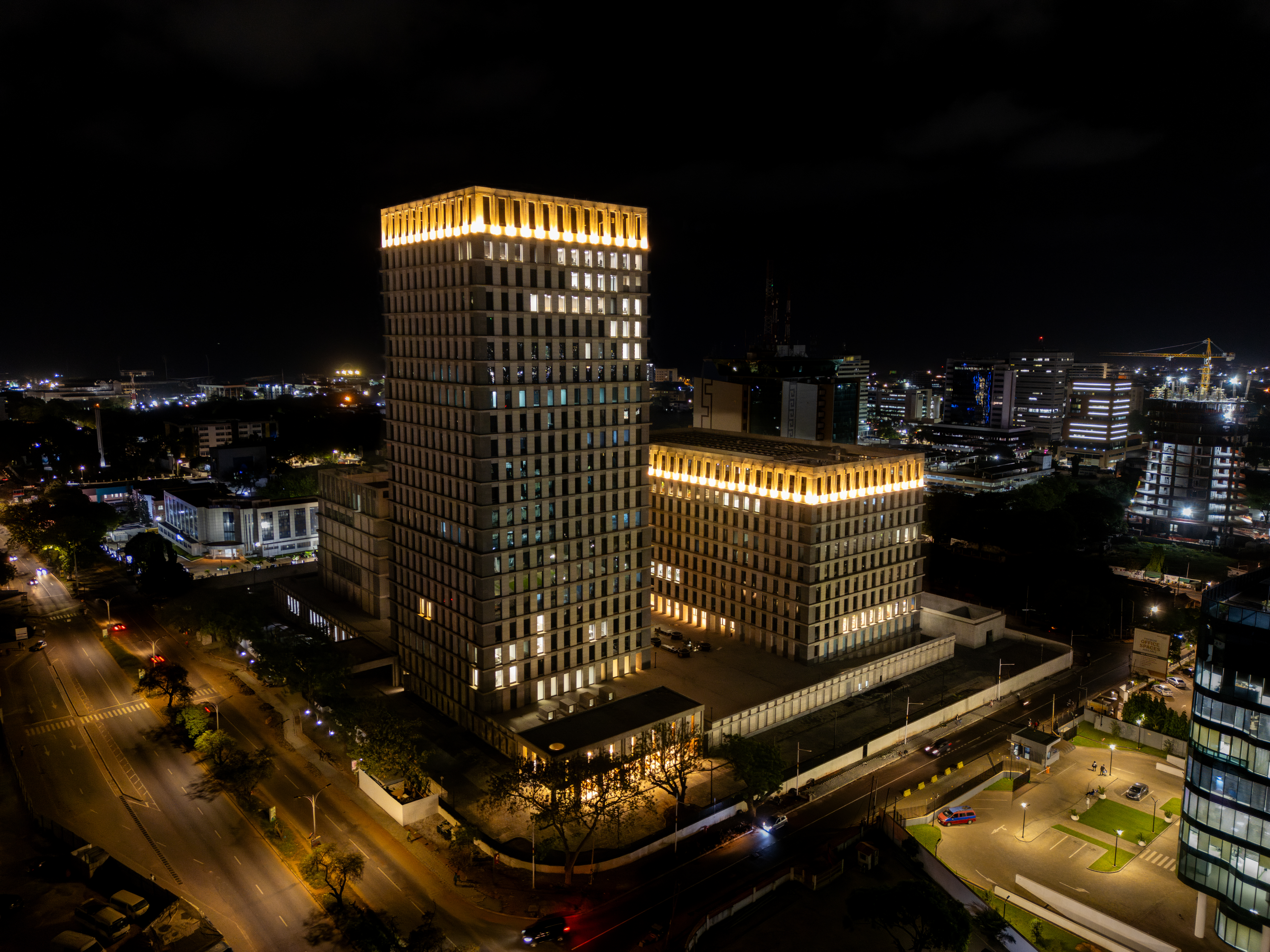
- The Bank Square in 2024

General information
- Status: Completed
- Location: Accra, Ghana
- Completed: 2024
- Opened: 20 November 2024; 16 months ago
- Cost: $250 million
- Owner: Bank of Ghana

Technical details
- Floor area: 150,000 sq m

Design and construction
- Main contractor: Goldkey Properties

The Bank Square is the head office complex of the Bank of Ghana, located in Accra. It was designed by David Adjaye and constructed by Goldkey Properties. The Bank Square was inaugurated in 2024 to replace the former headquarters of the Bank of Ghana.

Plans for a new headquarters had been made in the 1990s. The unsafe condition of the old headquarters necessitated the construction of the complex. Construction began in 2021 until completion in 2024. The Bank Square constitutes seven structures of which The Tower is Ghana’s tallest building reaching 100 meters with 22 floors

== Background ==
In August 2023, the Bank of Ghana (BOG) made a statement to justify the construction of a new headquarters. After structural integrity assessment, the BOG stated that the old headquarters dated to the 1960s, was vulnerable especially in the case of disasters such as tremors.

Within that month, the Governor of the bank of Ghana, Ernest Addison, explained in a press conference that plans for rebuilding a new head office dated back to the 1990s. In 2018, vacant land belonging to the SIC Insurance Company at Ridge was acquired by the BOG and an Executive Instrument was issued by the Government to authorize the acquisition. In 2019, the decision was made to begin construction of the new headquarters. The contract was awarded in 2020 as the contractor commenced construction in 2021. The project was met with mixed reaction as minority in Parliament opposed the project. Progress stood at 41% by August 2023. The headquarters was commissioned in November 2024 and officially named as The Bank Square.

== Architecture ==
David Adjaye handled the design while Goldkey Properties delivered the construction. The Bank Square is made up of 7 structures covering 150,000 square meters. One of such structures is The Tower which became the tallest building in Ghana rising at 100 meters with 22 floors upon completion in 2024. The 9-storey Urban Block, located within the complex, hosts a solar canopy which powers the entire complex. The Bank Square was built at a cost of $250 million.
