= Seth Terkper =

Ghanaian chartered accountant and politician

The Honourable Seth Terkper
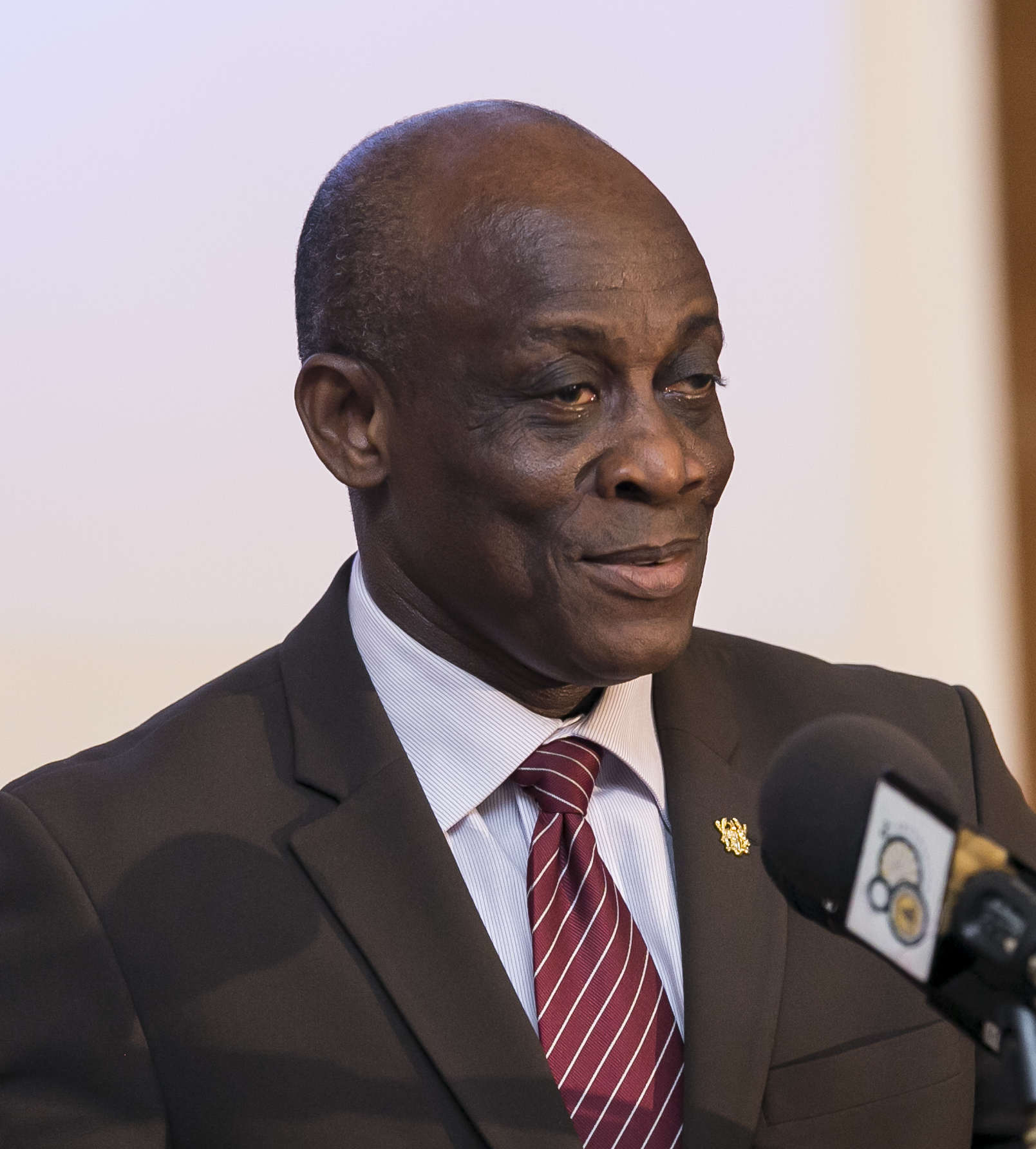

17th Minister for Finance and Economic Planning
- In office Jan 2013 – Jan 2017
- President: John Dramani Mahama
- Preceded by: Kwabena Duffuor
- Succeeded by: Ken Ofori-Atta

Deputy Minister for Finance and Economic Planning
- President: John Evans Attah-Mills
- Preceded by: George Gyan-Baffour
- Succeeded by: Cassiel Ato Forson

Personal details
- Party: National Democratic Congress
- Education: University of Cape Coast; Harvard University
- Occupation: Chartered Accountant

Seth Emmanuel Terkper is a Ghanaian chartered accountant and politician who served as the Minister for Finance and Economic Planning of Ghana from 2013 to 2017 under the John Mahama Government. He is currently serving as Economic Advisor to the president of the republic of Ghana.

== Early life and education ==
Seth Terkper was born in Somanya in the Eastern Region of Ghana, where he started his elementary school education in the Presby cluster of schools.

He obtained his first degree in B.Comm from the UCC in Ghana. He is also a Chartered Accountant who holds an MPA degree from the Kennedy School, Harvard University.

== Early career ==
Between July 1999 and February 2009, Terkper held various positions (last as Senior Economist) in the Fiscal Affairs Dept. (FAD) of the IMF in Washington, DC.

He participated in, and led, several technical assistance (TA) missions to member-states to improve the organization, process and legislation for revenue institutions. In so doing, he worked with colleagues in the Tax Policy [TP] and other Divisions in FAD; the African and Legal departments; the Caribbean Technical Assistance Centre [CARTAC]; and other IMF units to achieve critical TA goals. As a chartered accountant and public administrator, he follows fiscal, accounting, and other economic trends closely.

Before joining the IMF, Terkper worked in staff and management positions—including National VAT Coordinator and Deputy Commissioner—in the National Revenue Secretariat MOFEP and revenue agencies in Ghana. He played a key role in the introduction of the Value Added Tax (VAT) in Ghana.

== Political career ==
=== Deputy Minister for Finance and Economic Planning ===
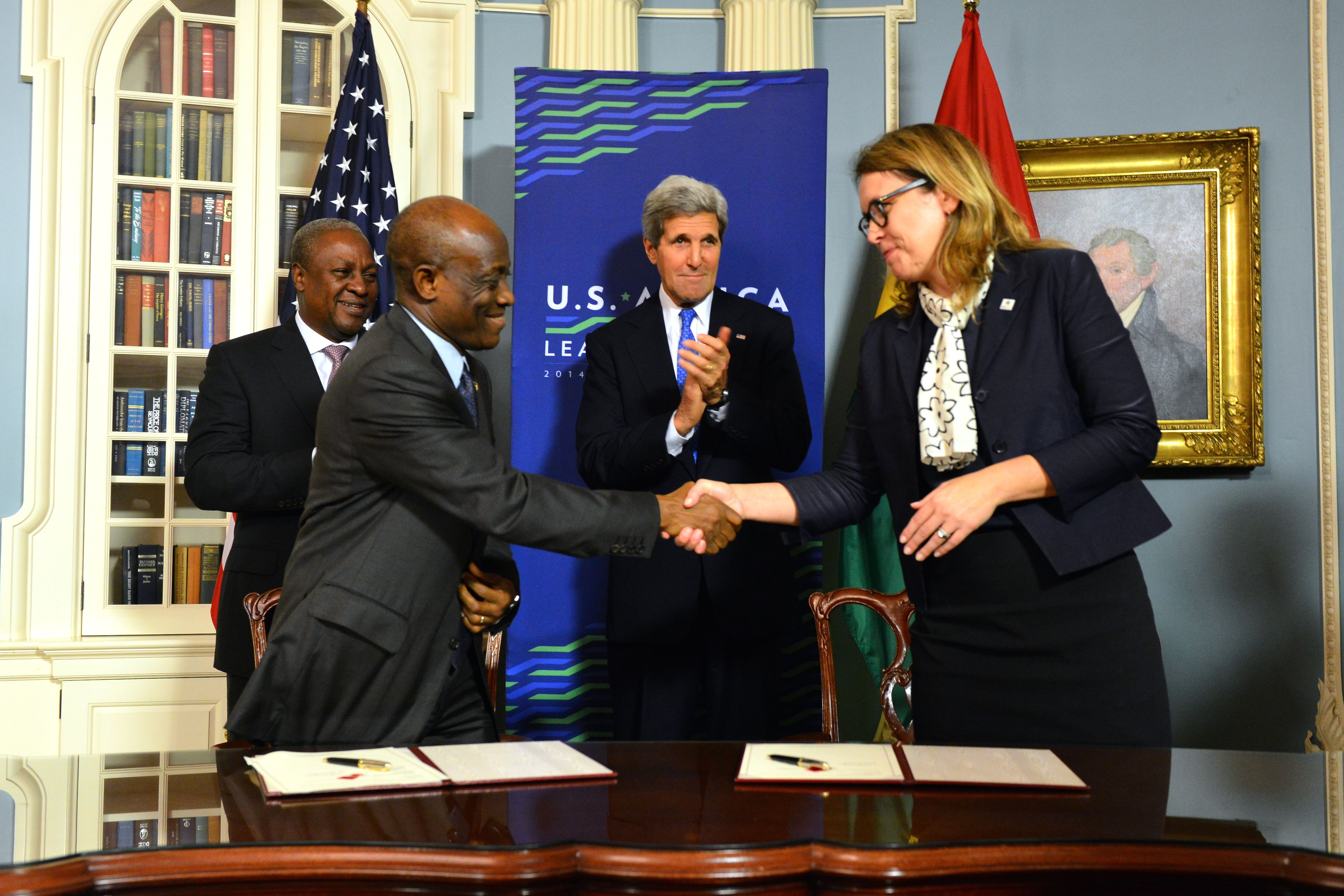
U.S.-Africa Leaders Summit MCC Ghana Compact. (Seth Tekper on the left side with President John Mahama behind him).

As a Deputy Minister in the MOFEP from March 2009 to January 2013, Terkper worked mainly on the Budget and Medium-Term Expenditure Framework (MTEF) as well as on revenue policy and administration. During the period, he became very active in working on government business in Parliament, including the passage of Bills and approval of International Agreements.

He is a member of the board of directors of the BOG and chaired the joint Steering Committee of the Ghana Revenue Authority (GRA) and Ghana Integrated Financial Management Information System (GIFMIS) reforms.

=== Minister for Finance and Economic Planning ===
In 2013 Terkper was appointed to serve as the 17th Minister for Finance and Economic Planning by President John Dramani Mahama after serving as the deputy minister in the John Evans Atta Mills Government.

He has consulted for the IMF; Harvard Institute for International Development (HIID), Harvard International Tax Program (ITP); African Development Bank (AfDB), and UN Committee of Tax Experts. He was a correspondent for Tax Analysts, USA.

Terkper has been part of and participated in leadership positions in local government (including membership of the Yilo District Assembly), social, religious, and student bodies.

== Author ==
Terkper published a book on VAT (VAT Handbook by Thompson-Reuters) in 2011 and continues to maintain a keen interest in research, publications, reviews and teaching.

== See also ==
- List of Mahama government ministers

== External links and sources ==
- Seth Terkper on Ministry of Finance and Economic Planning website

Political offices
Preceded by Kwabena Duffuor	Minister for Finance and Economic Planning; 2013 – 2017	Succeeded by Ken Ofori-Atta
