= Vincent Ekow Assafuah =

Ghanaian lawyer and politician

Hon. Vincent Ekow Assafuah MP
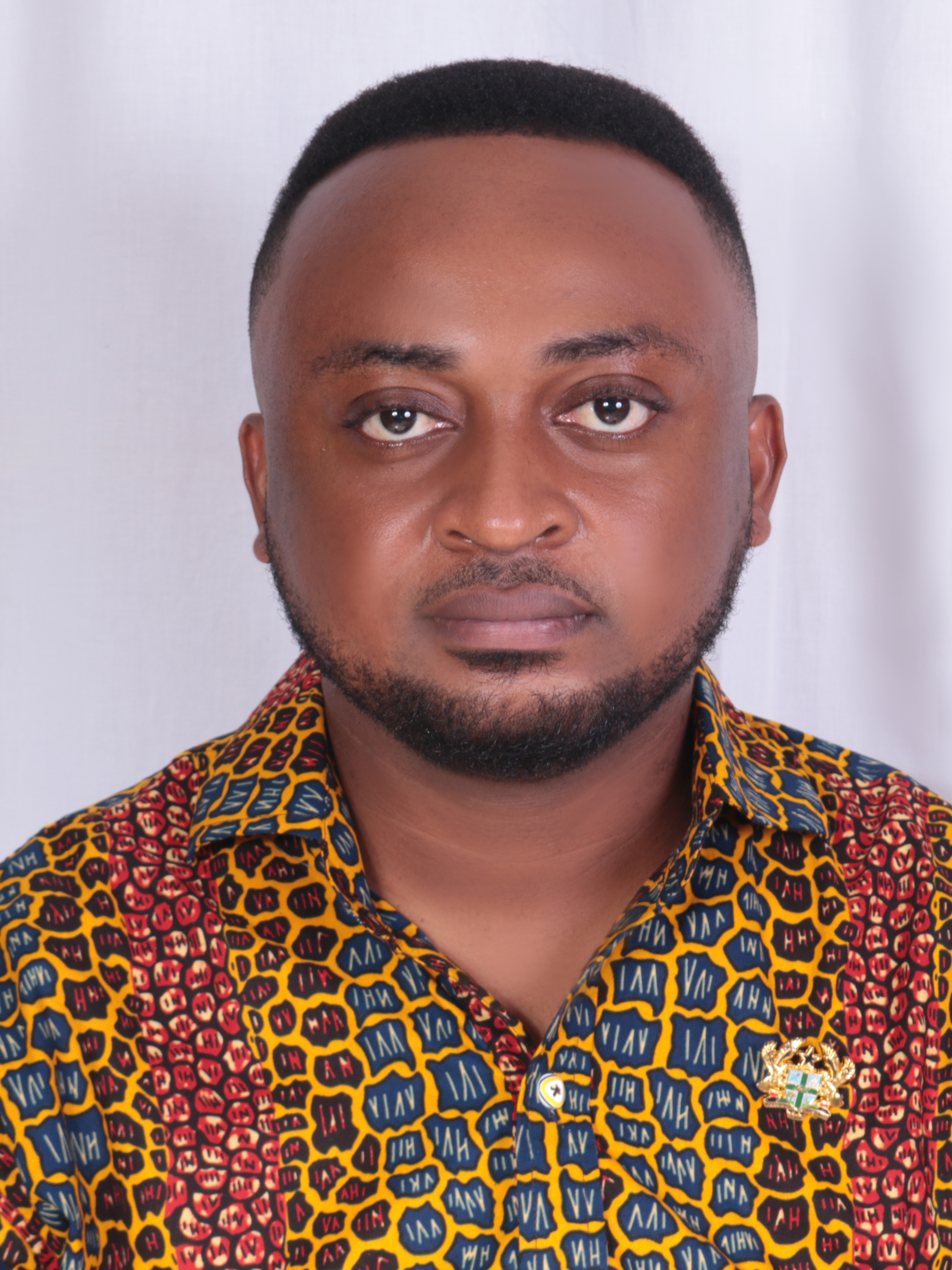

Member of the Ghana Parliament for Old Tafo
- Incumbent
- Assumed office 7 January 2021
- Preceded by: Anthony Akoto Osei

Personal details
- Born: 27 September 1990 (age 35)
- Party: New Patriotic Party
- Education: Kwame Nkrumah University of Science and Technology
- Profession: Lawyer, politician
- Committees: House Committee; Education Committee, Youth and Sports (Ranking Member)

Vincent Ekow Assafuah (born 27 September 1990) is a Ghanaian lawyer and politician who is a member of the New Patriotic Party (NPP). He was the public relations officer (PRO) for the Ministry of Education. He is the member of Parliament for the Old-Tafo Constituency in the Ashanti Region.

== Early life and education ==
Vincent Ekow Assafuah was born to Polykarp Assafuah and Paulina Assafuah in Kumasi. He attended Martyrs of Uganda Junior High School and proceeded to study General Arts at the St. Huberts’ Seminary in Kumasi. Assafuah holds a Bachelor of Arts degree in political science from the Kwame Nkrumah University of Science and Technology (KNUST), and Master of Arts degree in Economic Policy and a Master of Science in Development Finance both from University of Ghana (UG), Legon. He also holds a Bachelor of Law Degree (LLB) from Central University and a Professional Law Certificate from the Ghana School of Law. He later proceeded to the Ghana Institute of Journalism where he obtained a Master of Arts in Public Relations. He is currently pursuing a Ph.D. degree in Public Administration and Public Policy.

== Career ==
Assafuah contested and won the National Service Personnel Association (NASPA) National president whilst doing his National Service after his unsuccessful attempt in USAG presidential election, he served in that role for one year. He was a special assistant to the Second lady Samira Bawumia from 2015 to 2017. In 2017, he was the acting Deputy Communication Director of the New Patriotic Party (NPP). After the New Patriotic Party came in power in January 2017, He was subsequently appointed as the head of public relations at the Ministry of Education in 2018. He is also a part-time lecturer at the Dominion University College.

== Politics ==
In June 2020, Assafuah stood for the New Patriotic Party seat for the Old Tafo Constituency after the incumbent Anthony Akoto Osei declared his intention not to contest the 2020 election. With a total votes of 299, Assafuah won the primaries against the 5 other contenders. His closest contender Dr. Louisa Serwaa Carole got 133 whilst the others which included Prince Odeneho Oppong got 90, Archibald Acquah had no votes, Emmanuel Obeng and Lord Inusah Lansah had 44 votes and 27 votes respectively.

He won the 2020 December parliamentary elections for the Old Tafo Constituency. He was declared the winner with 42,616 votes representing 74.55% against his closest contender Sahmudeen Mohammed Kamil of the National Democratic Congress (NDC) who had 14,405 votes representing 25.20%.

In 2024, He was appointed as a Deputy Minister for Local Government and Rural Development.

=== Committees ===
He is a member of the Youth and Sports, House Committee and was also a member of the Education Committee.

== Personal life ==
Assafuah is a Christian and a man well grounded in the catholic faith. He is among the few Ghanaian politicians who still honours his role as a mass servant in the Catholic Church.
