= Isaac Chinebuah =

Ghanaian politician and academic (1929–2006)

Isaac K. Chinebuah

20th Minister for Foreign Affairs (Ghana)
- In office 1979–1981
- Preceded by: Mrs. Gloria Amon Nikoi
- Succeeded by: Dr. Obed Asamoah
- Constituency: Nzema East (now Ellembelle in 4th Republic)

Personal details
- Born: October 7, 1929 Tarkwa
- Died: June 8, 2006 (aged 76) Accra, Ghana
- Party: People's National Party
- Spouse: Jane Chinebuah
- Children: 8
- Occupation: Academic

Dr.Isaac K. Chinebuah (7 October 1929 – 8 June 2006) was an academic and the foreign minister in the People's National Party (PNP) government of the Third Republic of Ghana.

== Career ==
Dr. Chinebuah was a former headmaster of Achimota School from 1963 to 1966 and also a former lecturer at the Institute of African Studies of the University of Ghana, Legon. He was a Minister for Education and Information in Dr. Kwame Nkrumah's Convention People's Party government in the First Republic of Ghana.

Dr. Chinebuah became the Member of Parliament for Nzema East (now Ellembelle) constituency after the 1979 elections. He was appointed Minister of Foreign Affairs in the PNP government by Dr. Hilla Limann in the Third Republic from 1979 until its overthrow in a coup d'état on December 31, 1981. He became the running mate to Dr. Hilla Limann during the 1992 presidential election.

He died at the age of 78 on June 8, 2006. He was married to Jane Chinebuah. He had eight children.

== See also ==
- Minister for Foreign Affairs (Ghana)
- Limann government

Parliament of Ghana
New title	Member of Parliament for Nzema East (now Ellembelle in 4th Republic); 1979 – 1981	Parliament suspended after coup
Political offices
Preceded by Gloria Amon Nikoi	Foreign Minister; 1979 – 1981	Succeeded by Dr. Obed Asamoah
