= J. S. Addo =

Former Governor of the Bank of Ghana

John Saka Addo is a Ghanaian economist and statesman, who was governor of the Bank of Ghana from 29 March 1983 to 3 June 1987 and a member of the Council of State. He is a co-founder and former managing director of Prudential Bank Limited.

== Biography ==
Addo was born at Korle Gonno to Thomas Kpakpo Addo and Emelia Okaikor Addo (née Mensah of James Town).

He attended Achimota School and then studied economics at the University of Ghana, Legon, and was hired as a probationary officer at the Bank of Ghana in 1958. In 1963, he was appointed secretary to the board of directors. In 1965, he was appointed executive director and was promoted to deputy governor in 1968.

In 1983, he was appointed governor of the Bank of Ghana and served in that capacity until 1987. He is a co-founder of Prudential Bank Limited and was its chairman. In 2005, he was made a member of the Council of State.

== Career ==
After Achimota Training College, he taught at Accra Royal School for four months in 1951. In January 1952, he was invited by the late Mr. Attoh Okine, a former teacher at Achimota School to assist him establish a new secondary school at Dormaa Ahenkro in the Brong Ahafo Region. He was there from 1952 to 1953 teaching English and Mathematics before he left for further studies at the University of Ghana, Legon. His banking career at the Bank of Ghana as a Probationary Officer (officer trainee) started in 1958 after graduating in Economics from the University of Ghana, Legon. In 1963 he was appointed Secretary to the Board of Directors and in 1965 he was appointed Executive Director he was promoted to Deputy Governor in 1968. A feat he achieved within 10 years.

In 1983, he was appointed Governor of the Bank of Ghana he served in that capacity until 1987. His consultancy firm, J.S. Addo Consultants Limited, did the study for the establishment of Ecobank Ghana and he later became the first Chairman of the Bank. He is also a former Managing Director and Chairman of National Investment Bank (NIB). He and two colleagues from the National Investment Bank founded Prudential Bank Limited nearly eleven years ago and he has since been Chairman of the Bank. In 2005 he was made a member of the Council of State.

== Personal life ==
As a boy growing up in the neighbourhood of Korle Gonno, Accra, Saka was so inquisitive about the traditions of his people that anytime his father attended traditional functions such as outdooring and marriage or enstoolment ceremonies, he accompanied him. It was during such functions that he learnt about dances and the songs of his people, the Gas. His desire to know more about the traditions of the Ga people caught the attention of his colleagues at Achimota School, where he had his secondary school and teacher training education. He was made the head of the Ga group of the school in 1949. That leadership role gave him the opportunity to educate some of the students on the traditions and culture of the Gas through organised plays, dances and talks.

Hon J.S. Addo is married to Mrs Ida Amatechoe Addo (nee Laryea) and they have four children.

After the death of his first wife, Addo married Evelyn Naa Otua Addo (née Bonney), with whom he has one child called Genevieve Naa-Aku Addo.

Government offices
Preceded by A.E.K. Ashiabor	Governor of Bank of Ghana; 1983–1987	Succeeded by G.K. Agama
