= R v Adomako =

UKHL case on gross negligence manslaughter

- Court: House of Lords
- Full case name: Regina (Respondent) v. Adomako (Appellant)
- Decided: 30 June 1994
- Citations: 98 Cr App R 282; [1994] 3 All ER 79; [1994] 3 WLR 288; (1994) 98 Cr App R 282; [1994] UKHL 6; [1995] AC 171; [1995] 1 AC 171
- Transcript: transcript at BAILII
- Cases cited: R v. Seymour (Edward) [1983] 2 A.C. 493; R v. Bateman 19 Cr. App. R. 8; Andrews v. Director of Public Prosecutions [1937] A.C. 576; R v. Lawrence (Stephen) [1982] A.C. 510; R v. Williamson (1807) 3 C. & P. 635; Kong Cheuk Kwan v The Queen (1985) 82 Cr. App. R. 18; R v. Stone [1977] Q.B. 354; R v. West London Coroner, Ex parte Gray [1988] Q.B. 467

Court membership
- Judges sitting: Lord Mackay of Clashfern; Lord Keith of Kinkel; Lord Goff of Chieveley; Lord Browne-Wilkinson; Lord Woolf

Keywords
- Gross Negligence Manslaughter; Duty of Care; Breach of Duty; Reasonable Foreseeability; Involuntary Manslaughter; Criminal Act; Omissions; Adomako test; Anaesthetist; Circularity

R v Adomako [1994] UKHL 6, was a landmark United Kingdom criminal law case where the required elements to satisfy the legal test for gross negligence manslaughter at common law were endorsed and refined. It was held that in cases of manslaughter by criminal negligence involving a breach of duty the gross negligence test relied on by the Court of Appeal was sufficient and that it was not necessary to direct a jury to consider whether the recklessness definition should be applied.

The test, as set out in R v Bateman 19 Cr. App. R.8 and Andrews v DPP [1937] AC 576, confirmed that there needed to be in existence a breach of duty of care where the serious and obvious risk of death was reasonably foreseeable and that the breach or omission in question caused actual death and that the conduct of the defendant, when all the circumstances were considered, was so bad as to amount to a criminal act or omission.

The requirement to show that the defendant's breach of duty was "gross" helped develop the definition of gross negligence.

== Facts ==
On 4 January 1987, Alan Loveland, a thirty-three-year-old man, underwent an eye operation for detached retina. At 9:45 am, anaesthesia and paralysis were induced by the intravenous administration of drugs and an endotracheal tube was inserted to enable the patient to breathe with the aid of a mechanical ventilator.

At 45 minutes into the operation there was a change of anaesthetist from the registrar, Dr. Said and his assistant, to Dr John Adomako, a locum peripatetic. Around 35 minutes later, the supply of oxygen to the patient was interrupted by the endotracheal tube becoming disconnected. The disconnected ventilator went unnoticed and unremedied by the appellant, Dr Adomako. It was not until an alarm sounded on a blood pressure monitoring machine that the anaesthetist was alerted to a problem of some kind at which point Dr Adomako checked various pieces of equipment but failed to notice the disconnected oxygen tube which by now had not been supplying oxygen for at least four and a half minutes. A period of hypoxia led to cardiac arrest at 11:14 am, some 11 minutes after the tube became disconnected. It was the eye surgeon who noticed that the ventilator was disconnected and this was after resuscitation had commenced. Although Alan Loveland was successfully resuscitated, the prolonged period of oxygen deprivation caused cerebral hypoxia leading to severe brain damage. Alan Loveland never regained consciousness and died 6 months later.

On 26 January 1990 a jury convicted John Adomako of gross negligence manslaughter by a majority of 11 to 1. Mr Adomako appealed his conviction challenging the basis that a breach of duty should not have amounted to involuntary manslaughter, however, his conviction was upheld by the House of Lords.

== Judgment ==
Mr Adomako's appeal was dismissed. The House of Lords held that the ordinary common law principles of negligence had to be applied and that it needed to be established whether the appellant's negligent conduct was so bad in all the circumstances as to amount to a criminal act or omission. Adomako was under a duty to act as a reasonable anaesthetist.

The House of Lords in R v Adomako clarified the requisite elements (Note: The Court of Appeal in R v Prentice made reference to ingredients at [1994] Q.B. 302 and in R v Rudling [2016] EWCA Crim 741 at para. 18, as critical ingredients) for gross negligence manslaughter at common law with a four-part test which became known as the Adomako test:

- The existence of a duty of care which was owed to the deceased
- That this duty was breached by the accused
- That the breach must have either caused or significantly contributed to the death
- That the breach falls under the ordinary principles of gross negligence and therefore amounts to a crime

Lord Mackay of Clashfern expanded on how the test for involuntary manslaughter was formulated:

On this basis in my opinion the ordinary principles of the law of negligence apply to ascertain whether or not the defendant has been in breach of a duty of care towards the victim who has died. If such breach of duty is established the next question is whether that breach of duty caused the death of the victim. If so, the jury must go on to consider whether that breach of duty should be characterised as gross negligence and therefore as a crime. This will depend on the seriousness of the breach of duty committed by the defendant in all the circumstances in which the defendant was placed when it occurred. The jury will have to consider whether the extent to which the defendant's conduct departed from the proper standard of care incumbent upon him, involving as it must have done a risk of death to the patient, was such that it should be judged criminal.

— Lord Mackay of Clashfern L. C., R v. Adomako [1995] 1 A.C. 171., BAILII transcript

== Circularity of the Adomako test ==
The application of the test for gross negligence manslaughter in Adomako has been identified as involving an element of circularity. Lord Mackay conceded that the formulation of the test involved a circularity element but that this was not fatal to this test being the right one in order to identify how far the defendant's "conduct must depart from accepted standards to be characterised as criminal". The circularity problem is that the jury must be directed to convict the defendant if they, the jury, believe the conduct of the defendant was "criminal". This, however, leaves the burden of a question of law to be decided by the jury where they would not usually be expected to supply reasons for their verdicts which, in turn, leads to the problem of not being able to readily identify which criteria the jury applied for their determination in a certain case.

== Grossness element ==
The determination of the element of "grossness" in negligence can be variable and inexact. In a criminal court, it must be established that there is mens rea, where the extent of the defendant's liability depends on the amount of damage done and the degree of negligence. It is for the jury to examine the defendant's conduct in order to determine whether the element of "grossness" is sufficiently serious that it amounts to a criminal offence and would therefore warrant criminal liability for manslaughter. In the case of Adomako, the breach of duty was so serious that the appellant's conduct amounted to "a gross dereliction of care".

== See also ==
- Roe v Minister of Health (1954) - English tort law decision involving an objectivity test
