= Alex. E.K. Ashiabor =

Ghanaian economist

Alex E.K. Ashiagbor (December 1931 – 19 May 2017) was an economist and a former governor of the Bank of Ghana. He was governor from 15 July 1977 to 8 March 1983. Ashiagbor started his career at the Bank of Ghana after earning his degree in economics with a concentration in money and banking at the London School of Economics. He moved from the bank to become principal assistant secretary at the Ghana Ministry of Finance. In 1971 he was seconded from the ministry to the International Monetary Fund in Washington, D.C., as a senior economist, returning to Ghana and the Ministry of Finance as senior principal secretary in 1973. Ashiagbor was appointed Governor of the Bank of Ghana in 1977. Following his time at the bank, he was appointed director of the Commodities Division of the United Nations Conference on Trade and Development (UNCTAD) in Geneva. He held that position until he retired in 1994 and returned to Ghana, where he led the World Bank's Financial Sector Adjustment Program until 2000. Ashiagbor continued to serve his country well into his retirement and in 2006, was awarded the Order of the Star of Ghana in recognition of his contributions to the nation. He died on 19 May 2017 at the Korle Bu Teaching Hospital in Accra.

Government offices
Preceded by Amon Nikoi	Governor of Bank of Ghana; 1977–1983	Succeeded by J.S. Addo
