= Paul Acquah =

Ghanaian economist

Paul Amoaful Acquah is a Ghanaian economist and a former Deputy Director for the Africa Department of the International Monetary Fund from 1998 to 2001. He is also a former Governor of the Bank of Ghana (2001-2009).

== Early life and education ==
He was born in Juabo in the Western Region of Ghana. Acquah had his secondary education at St. Augustine's College. He later obtained his degree in Economics from the University of Ghana, Legon. He proceeded to obtain his master's degree from Yale University and his PhD from University of Pennsylvania.

== Career ==
Acquah joined the International Monetary Fund as an economist. He worked for the fund and served in various capacities till 1998 when he became the fund's deputy director of its Africa department. In 2001 he resigned from the IMF and was appointed by the then President of Ghana, John Kufuor as the Governor of the Bank of Ghana until 2009.

In September 2009, Acquah was placed on a four-person team set up to rescue the Tema Oil Refinery.

== Awards ==
In 2005, Acquah won the Emerging Markets award for Africa Central Bank Governor of the Year.

Government offices
Preceded by Kwabena Duffuor	Governor of Bank of Ghana; 2001–2009	Succeeded by Kwesi Amissah-Arthur
