= Anthony Akoto Osei =

Ghanaian politician (1953–2023)

Hon. Anthony Akoto Osei

Minister for Monitoring and Evaluation
- In office 7 February 2017 – 20 March 2023

Member of the Ghana Parliament for Old Tafo Constituency
- In office 7 January 2005 – 20 March 2023
- Preceded by: Constituency split

Minister for Finance and Economic Planning
- In office 2007 – 6 January 2009
- Preceded by: Kwadwo Baah Wiredu
- Succeeded by: Kwabena Duffuor

Deputy Minister for Finance and Economic Planning
- In office May 2003 – 2007

Personal details
- Born: 18 April 1953 Sunyani, Gold Coast (now Ghana)
- Died: 20 March 2023 (aged 69)
- Party: New Patriotic Party
- Children: 3
- Education: Howard University, American University, Oberlin College
- Profession: Economist/ Banker/ Insurer
- Committees: Finance Committee, Defense Committee(7th Parliament of 4th Republic of Ghana)

Anthony Akoto Osei (18 April 1953 – 20 March 2023) was a Ghanaian banker and politician. Osei was in the cabinet of President John Agyekum Kufuor first as Minister of State for Finance and Economic Planning and then Acting Minister of Finance. He was a member of Parliament for the electoral district of Old Tafo in the Ashanti region.

== Early life and education ==
Osei was born in Kumasi, the capital of the Ashanti Region, on 18 April 1953. He had his secondary level education at Achimota School and Opoku Ware Senior High School. He continued at Oberlin College in Ohio where he obtained a Bachelor's degree in economics. He earned a Master of Arts degree in applied economics from the American University in the USA. He also graduated from Howard University in 1987 with a PhD in economics.

== Career ==
Osei was an economist by profession. On 27 March 2002, Osei became a member of the management board of Merchant Bank (Ghana) Ltd. Previously, he worked as associate professor at Dillard University (USA) and before that as a research assistant at the Centre for Policy Analysis (Ghana).

== Political career ==
=== Deputy Finance Minister ===
Osei worked as the deputy minister of Finance and Economic Planning in May 2003 and was an economic advisor to the government. He was elevated to substantive acting Minister for Finance and Economic Planning after the death of the then Minister of Finance, Kwadwo Baah Wiredu. He served in that role until 6 January 2009 when the New Patriotic Party handed government over to the opposition National Democratic Congress, which had won the 2008 general election.

=== Minister for Monitoring and Evaluation ===
In February 2017, Osei was sworn in as Minister of Monitoring and Evaluation after being nominated by President Nana Akufo-Addo and going through the vetting process in the parliament of Ghana. Monitoring and Evaluation was a newly created ministry to monitor and plan review summits and forums, in fulfilment of the government's policies on evaluating the progress of its own ministries.

==== Cabinet Minister ====
In May 2017, President Nana Akufo-Addo named Anthony Akoto Osei as one of 19 ministers who would form his cabinet. The names of the 19 ministers were submitted to the Parliament of Ghana and announced by the Speaker of the House, Right Honourable Professor Aaron Mike Oquaye. As a cabinet minister, Osei was part of the president’s inner circle and assisted in key decision-making in Ghana.

=== Other positions held ===
Centre for Policy Analysis (CEPA), Accra; consultant to the World Bank (Korean Division), 1987; associate professor in economics at Howard University from 1984 to 1995; Special Advisor, Ministry of Finance and Economic Planning, 2001–2003; Deputy Minister of Finance, 2003–2007; Minister of State, 2007–2008; Acting Minister of Finance, September 2008 - 6 January 2009; MP for Old Tafo-Pankrono and MP for Old Tafo (January 2005 to January 2017).

== Elections ==
Osei was elected as the member of parliament for the Old Tafo constituency of the Ashanti Region of Ghana for the first time in the 2004 Ghanaian general election. He won on the ticket of the New Patriotic Party. His constituency was one of the 36 parliamentary seats out of 39 seats won by the New Patriotic Party in that election in the Ashanti Region. The New Patriotic Party won a majority total of 128 out of 230 parliamentary seats. He was elected in 2004 with 34,957 votes out of 44,000 total valid votes cast. This was equivalent to 79.4% of total valid votes cast. He was elected over Salu Ibrahim of the National Democratic Congress, Andrews K Asamoah-Akoto of the Convention People's Party and Amediku Dominic D Quarshie an independent candidate. These three candidates obtained 7,116 (16.2%), 426 (1%) and 1,501 votes (3.4%), respectively, of the total valid votes cast.

In 2008, Osei won the general election on the ticket of the New Patriotic Party for the same constituency. His constituency was among the 34 parliamentary seats out of 39 seats won by the New Patriotic Party in that election in the Ashanti Region. The New Patriotic Party won a minority total of 109 parliamentary seats out of 230 seats. Osei was elected with 36,171 votes out of 47,478 total valid votes cast. This was equivalent to 76.18% of total valid votes cast. He was elected over Swallah Ali of the People's National Convention, Dominic Kwabena Anomah of the National Democratic Congress, Issah Abdul Salam of the Convention People's Party and Mohammed Rabui Umar of the Reformed Patriotic Democrats. These candidates obtained 427, 10,386, 375 and 119 votes, respectively, out of the total valid votes cast: equivalent to 37.59%, 5.43% and 1.28%, respectively, of the total vote.

In 2012, Osei won the general election once again for the same constituency. He was elected with 43,561 votes out of 57,478 total valid votes cast. This was equivalent to 75.79% of total valid votes cast. He was elected over Memuna Kabore Abu-Bakr Siddique of the National Democratic Congress, Faruk Muhammed Tankoh of People's National Convention and Issah Abdul Salam of the Convention People's Party. These obtained 13,454, 149 and 314 votes, respectively, of the total valid votes cast: equivalent to 23.41%, 0.26% and 0.55%, respectively, of the total votes cast.

== Personal life and death ==
Osei was a Catholic. He was married with three children. He died on 20 March 2023 at the age of 69.

== See also ==
- Kufuor government
- List of Ghanaian politicians
