= Roe v Minister of Health =

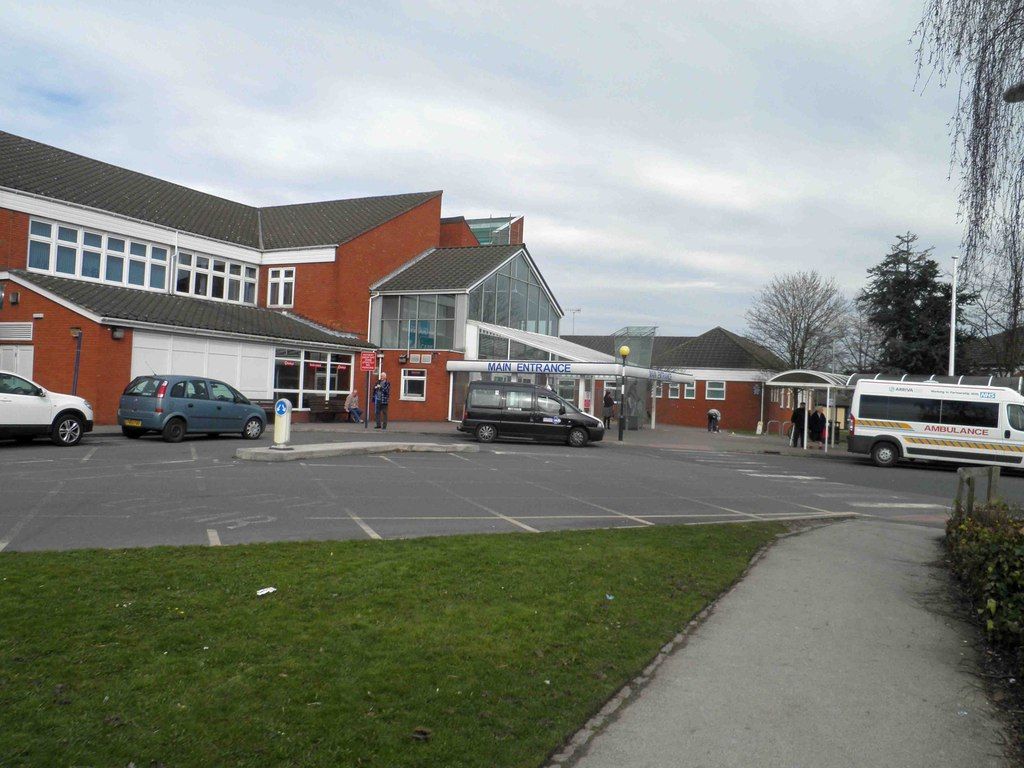
- Chesterfield Royal Hospital
- Court: Court of Appeal
- Decided: 8 April 1954
- Citation: [1954] 2 All ER 131 [1954] EWCA Civ 7 [1954] 2 QB 66 [1954] 2 WLR 915

Court membership
- Judge sitting: Denning LJ Buckley LJ Somervell LJ

Roe v Minister of Health [1954] 2 All ER 131 is an English tort law decision of the Court of Appeal of England and Wales which has had a significant influence on the common law throughout the common law world.

== Facts ==
Roe and Woolley underwent surgery on 13 October 1947 at the Chesterfield Hospital. It was managed under the general supervision of the Minister of Health. Before entering the operating theatre, an anaesthetic consisting of Nupercaine was administered by means of a lumbar puncture. The spinal anaesthetics had been given by Dr Malcolm Graham. At that time, it was common practice to store such anaesthetic in glass ampoules immersed in a phenol solution to reduce the risk of infection. Unknown to the staff, the glass had a number of micro-cracks which were invisible to the eye. An expert witness at the trial stated that the micro-cracks had allowed the phenol to penetrate the ampoules, and so when used, the phenol-contaminated anaesthetic caused permanent paraplegia.

== Legal Background ==
As the law then stood, to find negligence proved, there must be a duty of care, the defendant must have breached that duty, and that breach must have caused the loss or damage sustained by the plaintiff. The standard of care required of defendants was judged by applying an objective test, considering what a "reasonable man" would or would not have done in the same situation. In Hall v Brooklands Auto Racing Club (1933) 1 KB 205, it was held that it was the duty of the operators to ensure that the racing track they had designed was as free from danger as reasonable care and skill could make it, but that they were not insurers against accidents which no reasonable diligence could foresee. Similarly, in Glasgow Corporation v Muir (1943) 2 AER 44, a defendant was not negligent in allowing a group to enter a tea room to escape bad weather, because the "reasonable man" would not have foreseen that these invitees would be injured (scalded) upon entering the tearoom.

== Judgment ==
The court held that there was no negligence, since Dr Graham and the hospital had followed what was at the time considered to be best medical practice.

Denning LJ. "We must not look at the 1947 incident with 1954 spectacles." It was held that the micro-cracks were not foreseeable given the prevailing scientific knowledge of the time. Thus, since no reasonable anaesthetist would have stored the anaesthetic differently, it was inappropriate to hold the hospital management liable for failing to take precautions. That the profession had changed its practice in the light of experience proved that the profession was responsible in its self-regulation. In 1954, anaesthetists coloured the phenol with a dye. If a vial became contaminated, the dye showed inside the vial. These vials were then discarded. But, given that the hospital was applying the best practice of the time, there was no negligence.

Somervell LJ. "It is now clear that phenol can find its way into an ampoule of nupercaine stored in a solution of phenol through cracks which are not detectable by the ordinary visual or tactile examination which takes place in an operating theatre—these cracks were referred to in the evidence as "invisible cracks"—or through molecular flaws in the glass. The attention of the profession was first drawn to this risk in this country by the publication of Professor Macintosh's book on Lumbar Puncture and Spinal Anaesthesia in 1951. In 1947 the general run of competent anaesthetists would not appreciate this risk. (Dr Mcintosh, Day 3, 18, 19, 42-E; Dr Organe, Day 8, 61; Dr Cope, Day 9, 25). Dr Graham certainly did not appreciate this as a risk. I accordingly find that by the standard of knowledge to be imputed to competent anaesthetists in 1947, Dr Graham was not negligent in failing to appreciate this risk and a fortiori the theatre staff were not negligent."

Morris LJ "It is now known that there could be cracks not ordinarily detectable. But care has to be exercised to ensure that conduct in 1947 is only judged in the light of knowledge which then was or ought reasonably to have been possessed. In this connection the then-existing state of medical literature must be had in mind. The question arises whether Dr Graham was negligent in not adopting some different technique. I cannot think that he was."

== Medical Analysis ==
Even at the time of the case, doctors (including Dr Graham) and medical journals doubted that phenol had caused the paralysis (judging by the effects the claimants had suffered and the timeline). A later analysis in 1990 suggests that the most probable cause of the paralyses was in fact an acidic descaler which, by an oversight, had been allowed to remain in the sterilizing water boiler. When the spinal needles and syringes were then boiled, the acid contaminated the spinal anaesthetic solution when it was withdrawn from the ampoule before injection.

The adverse publicity around the case and the uncertainty as to the paraplegia's true cause is alleged to have significantly limited the adoption and usage of spinal anaesthesia in the UK by 20–25 years.

== See also ==
- Bolam v Friern Hospital Management Committee
- List of cases involving Lord Denning
- R v Adomako UK criminal case on gross negligence manslaughter involving anaesthesia
