= Kwabena Duffuor =

Former Finance Minister of Ghana (born 1946)

Hon. Kwabena Duffuor
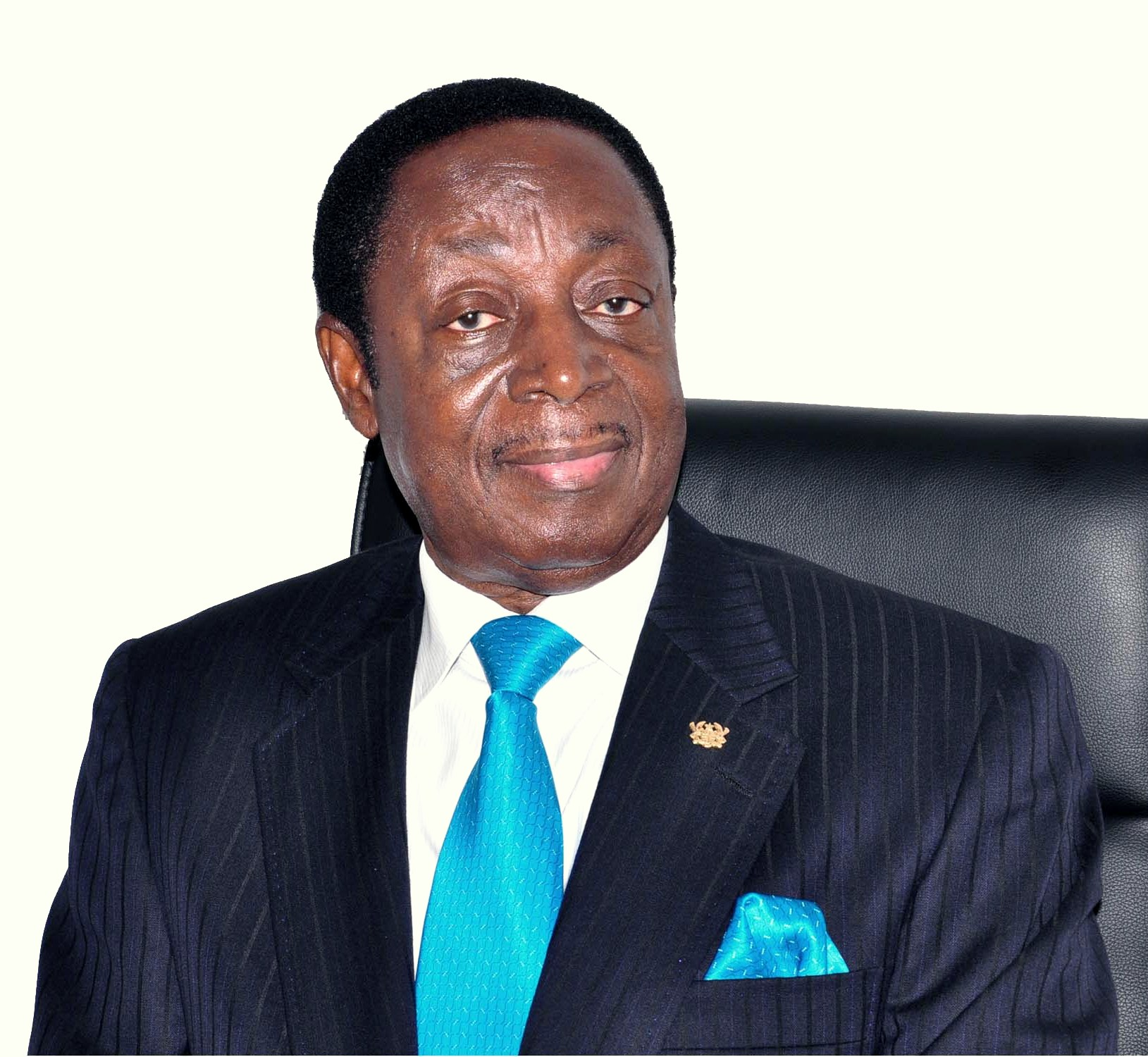

Finance Minister
- In office January 2009 – January 2013
- President: John Atta Mills
- Preceded by: Anthony Akoto Osei
- Succeeded by: Seth Terkper

Governor, Bank of Ghana
- In office July 1997 – September 2001
- President: Jerry Rawlings
- Preceded by: G.K. Agama
- Succeeded by: Paul Acquah

Personal details
- Born: 1946 (age 79–80)
- Party: National Democratic Congress
- Children: 5
- Education: University of Ghana; Syracuse University
- Profession: Banker, lecturer, politician

Kwabena Duffuor was the Finance Minister of Ghana. He served as the governor of the Bank of Ghana. He was named as one of the four best Central Bank Governors in the World at an IMF/World Bank meeting in 1999. He is a Fellow of the Akuafo Hall, University of Ghana, and a Fellow of the Chartered Institute of Bankers.

Duffuor is the founder and chairman of HODA Holdings, a business entity comprising Insurance, Banking, Real Estates, Farming, Mining and Media. He is also the founder and president of the Institute for Fiscal Studies in Ghana, a non-profit think-tank providing economic advocacy and training which he established in March, 2013. He is also the founder of uniBank which controversially collapsed in 2018.

== Early life and education ==
In 1958, Kwabena Duffuor entered Prempeh College in Kumasi for his secondary school education through the Ghana Cocoa Marketing Board scholarship, where he obtained both his O-Level and A-Level certificates in 1962 and 1964 respectively. He proceeded to the University of Ghana where he graduated in 1968 with a B. Sc. degree in Economics. And after working briefly with the Volta River Authority, he started his career with the Ghana Commercial Bank in 1969. Between the years 1973 and 1979, while working with GCB Bank, Duffuor obtained a USAID and African Graduate Fellowship Awards to pursue further studies at Syracuse University in New York. He obtained an MBA in Finance and Banking, an MA in economics in 1975 and a PhD in 1979, all from the Maxwell School of Citizenship and Public Affairs at the Syracuse University. He was also awarded a Doctorate of Philosophy in International Finance in 1979 at the same university.

After working briefly as an economist at the IMF in Washington, Duffuor returned to Ghana and combined his banking work at Ghana Commercial Bank with Lecturing in Economics and Finance at the University of Ghana between 1980 and 1991.

== Career ==
Duffuor started work with the Ghana Commercial Bank in 1969, where he rose to become chief economist and head of research department. Between 1982 and 1991, Duffuor worked full-time as a banker. He also worked as a part-time lecturer in economics, finance and banking at the Economics Department and the School of Administration at the University of Ghana. He was appointed an external examiner in finance from 1985 at the university. In 1995, he became deputy governor of the Bank of Ghana. In July 1997, President Jerry Rawlings appointed Duffuor as the governor of the Bank of Ghana. He held this position till his four-year term ended in September 2001.

At Ghana Commercial Bank, he rose through the ranks, becoming general manager and head of London Branch in 1991. Under his tenureship the GCB London Branch registered very impressive growth. The bank's profits soared from £1.5 million in 1991 to £3.6 million in 1994. Consequently, the Income/Expense ratio dropped from 75per cent in 1991 to 55 per cent by the end of 1994. During the same period Duffuor led a group of international banks including chemical bank (London), standard chartered bank (London) in arranging a syndicated loan of $140 million for Ghana Cocoa Board and $65 million for Ghana National Petroleum Corporation (GNPC).

By 1994, the GCB London had become so visible in the city of London that he was invited to the prestigious Annual Dinner of the Lord Mayor of London at Mansion House on 14 June 1994. The invitation was to give Dr Duffuor opportunity to meet notable personalities including the Chancellor of Exchequer, governor of the Bank of England, head of Lloyd's of London and the lord mayor of London as well as captains of industry and finance in the United Kingdom.

In July 1995, Duffuor was appointed the Deputy Governor of the Bank of Ghana, and therefore came back home. As deputy governor he focused on the restructuring of Government Accounts, Human Capital Development, Commercial Banking Services and Treasury Services and Foreign Exchange Market Development of the bank. He again initiated the introduction of two-way quotation system (offer/bid rates in the Foreign Exchange transaction in the bank and thereby removed the subsidy to users of foreign exchange. In 1996, he arranged US$100 million Syndicated Facility with Societe General Bank (London) Branch for the Government of Ghana through the Ministry of Finance.

In July 1997, he was appointed governor of the bank; driving a range of reforms in the bank, including the conversion of Ghana Commercial Bank London Branch into a UK incorporated Bank – Ghana International Bank, plc in March 1998. In November 1997, an honorary fellowship was conferred on Dr Duffuor by the Institute of Bankers in Ghana for his loyal and meritorious service to the banking industry. He was nominated Ghana's man of the year by the readers of The Independent newspaper.

== Board engagements ==
In March 2003, Duffuor was appointed chairman of the Presidential Committee on Promotion and Revitalization of the Industrial Sector on Sustainable Basis. Again in December 2003, the governments of Ghana and Denmark jointly appointed him to the chairmanship of the Programme Committee for the Business Sector Programme Support (BSPS) which the Danish Government sponsored for the Ghanaian Private Sector Development for the period 2003–08.

Duffuor is currently the chairman of Ghana Heart Foundation and Kumawuman Rural Bank. He has also served in a number of directorship positions in various companies, including Accra Brewery Limited, Shell Ghana Limited, Ecobank Cote d'lvoire, State Gold Mining Corporation. Ghana Cocoa Board, Ashanti Goldfields Company Limited, and, Ghana International Bank Plc. London where he was the board chairman between 1998 and 2001.

He is a Fellow of the Akuafo Hall, University of Ghana, and a Fellow of the Chartered Institute of Bankers.

== Politics ==
Kwabena Duffuor was a member of the Convention People's Party. He was appointed as finance minister in John Atta Mills's National Democratic Congress government in February 2009.

Duffour filed a nomination form in 2023 to run against John Dramani Mahama as the flagbearer of the National Democratic Congress, but he later withdrew from the campaign due to concerns about the neutrality and transparency of the party's election process.

== Awards ==
In 1998, Duffuor was voted "Personality of the Year" by the Independent newspaper in Ghana. In this same year, he was again voted "Marketing Man of the Year" by the Chartered Institute of Marketing, Ghana (CIMG). For his loyal and meritorious service to the banking industry in Ghana the Institute of Bankers – Ghana, conferred an Honorary Fellowship on Duffuor in November 1997. In September 1999, he was commended for being one of the best four Central Bank Governors in the World by Euromoney Publications at the IMF/World Bank meeting held in Washington, DC. In May 2002, Duffuor was honoured by the GCB Bank in recognition of his 26 years of loyal and dedicated service to the bank as well as the honour done to the bank in his appointment to the high office of the governor of the Bank of Ghana.

In February 2002, the Rural Bankers’ Association of Ghana honoured Duffuor for his immense contribution to the development of the Rural Banking sector in the country. In September 2002, The Ashanti Regional chapter of the Rural Banker's Association's appreciated and honoured Duffuor for being founder and first president of the association who also made very significant contribution to the development of a vibrant rural banking industry in the Ashanti Region.

In July 2010, Duffuor was awarded the International Distinguished Merit Award by the West African Insurance Institute, in recognition for his outstanding contribution to the development of Insurance in Africa and specifically for his unreserved support for the promotion of insurance education in the region and especially to the West African Insurance Institute.

In 2011 he was named by The Banker as Africa's finance minister of the Year 2011. Also in October 2011, Africa investor (Ai), a leading international investment research and communication group awarded Duffuor the African Finance Minister of the Year 2011 Award during the prestigious Africa investor (Ai) Investment and Business Leader Awards held in Washington during the World Bank Annual Meetings.

Duffuor received a Lifetime Achievement Award in Banking and Finance from Corporate Initiative Ghana, organizers of Ghana Banking Awards, at a ceremony held in December 2014. In January 2015, TV station Viasat 1 named Dr Duffuor "Man of the Year 2014" in Ghana, for his outstanding success in business. This was the second time this ‘‘Man of the Year ’’ award has been given to the same person in his lifetime in Ghana.

In July 2015, Duffuor received an Exceptional Achievement Award from GUBA at an event that took place at the Hilton Metropole Hotel, London. In September 2015, he was awarded a Special Music Pillar Honour award by MUSIGA at an event which took place at the Banquet Hall, State House. In recognition of his extraordinary contribution to the development of this country, the Republic of Ghana conferred on Dr Kwabena Duffuor the State honour of Companion of the Order of the Volta (CV) in December 2015.

== Controversies and allegations ==
Duffuor was a founder of uniBank, a defunct major Ghanaian bank. The bank was set up in 1997 at a time when he was Governor of the BoG. The bank was put into administration by the Bank of Ghana (BoG) in 2018 and then consolidated with four other defunct banks during Ghana's banking crisis. At the time of its administration the bank was led by his son Dr Kwabena Duffuor jr.

In taking over the bank, the BoG cited weak supervisory standards, weak operations and persistent liquidity shortfalls and breaches in its cash reserve requirements as reasons for taking over the bank. At the time of its administration, it was reported that it had a negative capital adequacy of -24% at December 2017 and had been reliant on more than 2.2 billion cedis (US$498m at the time) of liquidity support from the BoG to continue to operate.

The bank's Receivers subsequently sued Duffuor, HODA, his son and a number of others for the return of 5 billion cedis in assets. The Receivers allege that Directors and shareholders of the bank engaged in illegal transactions by giving out unlawful loans as well as illegal acquisition of assets in the name of related interests.

Duffuor has attempted to regain control of the bank by countersuing the Ghana Government alleging the bank had been effectively expropriated. The lawsuit disclosed that almost all of uniBank's loan book was classed as impaired. His son has also sued the administrator KPMG and its staff alleging deceit and that they aimed to enrich themselves by deliberately misleading the Government into collapsing the bank.

== See also ==
- List of Mills government ministers

Government offices
Preceded by G.K. Agama	Governor of Bank of Ghana; 1997–2001	Succeeded by Paul Acquah
Political offices
Preceded by Anthony Akoto Osei	Ministry of Finance and Economic Planning; 2009–2013	Succeeded by Seth Terkper
