= G.K. Agama =

Ghanaian economist and a governor of the Bank of Ghana

Hon. Godfried Kportufe Agama

Member of Parliament for South Tongu Constituency 1979-81
- President: Hilla Limann

Personal details
- Born: 28 April 1936 Asidovui-Agava, Volta Region
- Died: 5 August 2009 (aged 73) Accra
- Party: United National Convention
- Children: 4
- Education: Mfantsipim School, McGill University, Toronto University
- Occupation: Economist
- Profession: Politician

Godfried Kportufe Agama (28 April 1936 – August 5, 2009) was a Ghanaian economist and a governor of the Bank of Ghana. He held the record to date for being the longest-serving governor of the bank. He was also a politician and Member of Parliament in the 1979 Ghanaian parliament representing the South Tongu Constituency in the Volta Region of Ghana.

== Early life and education ==
Agama hailed from Asidovui-Agava in the Tongu District of Volta Region in Ghana. He attended the McGill University in Montreal and the Toronto University. He had his Doctor of Philosophy from the McGill University.

== Politics ==
Agama was a member of the Constituent Assembly of Ghana from 1968 to 1969. He was a member of United National Convention and also the member of parliament representing the South Tongu constituency in the Volta Region from 1979 to 1981.

== Personal life ==
Agama was married to Comfort Henrietta Agama and they had 4 children.

== Death and burial ==
Agama died on 5 August 2009 at the 37 Military Hospital. He was buried on 4 September 2009 at Asidowhi near Agave in the South Tongu District in the Volta Region of Ghana.

Government offices
Preceded by J.S. Addo	Governor of Bank of Ghana; 1986–1997	Succeeded by Kwabena Duffuor
