= Amon Nikoi =

Ghanaian economist

Amon Nikoi OV
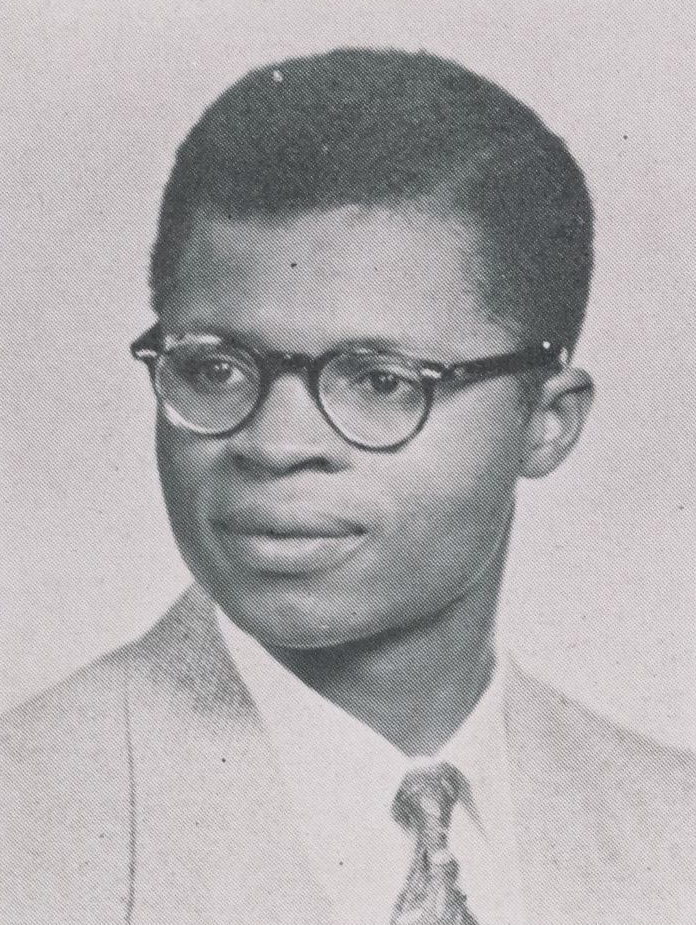
- Nikoi in the Amherst College yearbook, 1953

Minister for Finance and Economic Planning
- In office September 1979 – May 1981
- President: Hilla Limann
- Preceded by: J. L. S. Abbey
- Succeeded by: George Benneh

Governor, Bank of Ghana
- In office 16 March 1973 – June 1977
- President: Ignatius Kutu Acheampong
- Preceded by: J.H. Frimpong-Ansah
- Succeeded by: A.E.K. Ashiabor

Permanent Representative of Ghana to the United Nations
- In office 1957–1960
- President: Kwame Nkrumah

Personal details
- Born: Seth Amon Nikoi; 19 January 1930 Accra, Gold Coast
- Died: 5 September 2002 (aged 72) Accra, Ghana
- Spouse: Gloria Amon Nikoi (m. 1959)
- Relations: List: Nii Amaa Ollennu (uncle); Nathan Quao (uncle); Nicholas T. Clerk (cousin); George C. Clerk (cousin)
- Children: 3
- Education: Achimota College; Amherst College (B.A.); Harvard University (MPA, Ph.D.)
- Occupation: Economist; Diplomat

Amon Nikoi, born Seth Amon Nikoi, OV (19 January 1930 – 5 September 2002) was a Ghanaian economist and diplomat. He was the Permanent Representative of Ghana to the United Nations between 1957 and 1960 as well as the Governor of the Bank of Ghana from 16 March 1973 to June 1977. He had a stint as the Finance minister and a presidential advisor between September 1979 to May 1981 under Hilla Limann during the Third Republic.

== Early life and education ==
Nikoi was born in the Accra suburb of La on 19 January 1930 to Ga parents. His father, Gottfried Ashaley Nikoi was a civil servant while his mother, Agnes Betty Oboshie Quao was a teacher and a textiles trader. Amon Nikoi's maternal great-grandfather, Nii Ngleshie Addy I was the oldest son of Nii Tetteh Tsuru I, the founder and ruler of the Otuopai Clan, a royal house in Ga Mashie.

Amon Nikoi had his primary and middle education at the Roman Catholic Jubilee School in Cape Coast followed by his secondary school at Achimota College between 1945 and 1948. He graduated from Amherst College in 1953 with a bachelor's degree in Economics. He proceeded to Harvard University as a Fellow from 1953 to 1955 for his master's degree in Public Administration and a doctorate in Political Economy and Government. Both degrees were conferred upon Nikoi in 1956. Amon Nikoi's Ph.D. dissertation was titled, "Indirect rule and government in Gold Coast Colony 1844-1954; a study in the history, ecology and politics of administration in a changing society."

== Career ==
From 1957 to 1960, he worked with the Commonwealth and Foreign Service as an economic and political affairs secretary-attaché at the Embassy of Ghana in Washington, DC and the Permanent Representative of Ghana to the United Nations (UN). In 1960, he was appointed the Alternate Executive Director of the International Monetary Fund (IMF) until 1966 when he was promoted to the level of executive director of the IMF. He left the IMF to return to his homeland at the end of 1968. In January 1969, he became the first Director of Budget at the Ministry of Finance and Economic Planning. He was quickly given the portfolio of Senior Principal Secretary of the Ministry of Finance, a position he remained in until February 1973.

The Ghanaian government selected and confirmed him as the new governor and chairman of the board of directors of the Bank of Ghana in March 1973 until his forced retirement in June 1977 by the military government, National Redemption Council (NRC) led by Army General Ignatius Kutu Acheampong.

When constitutional rule returned in 1979, the Third Republican government of the Hilla Limann-led People's National Party (PNP) made him Minister of Finance and Economic Planning and later, a presidential advisor. He entered private practice as an Economic and Financial Consultant to various private sector firms and public institutions both home and abroad. He was also the chairman of Ashanti Goldfields Company (AGC) and Grains Warehousing Company.

In recognition of his services to Ghana in Public Administration and Banking, the government at the time, Supreme Military Council II led by military general, Fred Akuffo awarded him the State Honour of the Order of the Volta (Civil Division).

== Personal life and family ==
He was married to Gloria Amon Nikoi (née Addae), Ghana's first female foreign minister. They had three children. His younger brother, Gottfried Dzane Nikoi worked in the Attorney–General's Department as a state attorney. His maternal uncle was the Ghanaian barrister and judge, Nii Amaa Ollennu who was elected the Speaker of the Parliament of Ghana during the Second Republic as well as serving as the Chairman of the Presidential Commission and acting President of Ghana from 7 August 1970 to 31 August 1970. The diplomat and public servant, Nathan Quao was also his uncle. His first cousins were the brothers, Nicholas and George Clerk.

== Death and funeral ==
Nikoi died of natural causes on 5 September 2002. His funeral service was held at the Accra Ridge Church where he was a congregant and his remains were buried at the La Public Cemetery.

Government offices
Preceded by J.H. Frimpong-Ansah	Governor of Bank of Ghana; 1973–1977	Succeeded by A.E.K. Ashiabor
Political offices
Preceded by J. L. S. Abbey	Ministry of Finance and Economic Planning; 1979-1981	Succeeded by George Benneh
