= W. M. Q. Halm =

Ghanaian economist

William Marmon Quao Halm (born 24 July 1902) was a Ghanaian economist. He was a governor of the Bank of Ghana from 5 October 1962 to 13 August 1965. He was born in Akuse. From 1959 to 1962 ambassador of Ghana to the USA.

Government offices
Preceded by H. Kessels	Governor of Bank of Ghana; 1962–1965	Succeeded by A. Adomako
