= J. H. Frimpong-Ansah =

Ghanaian economist

J. H. Frimpong-Ansah (22 October 1930 – 21 April 1999) was an economist and a Governor of the Bank of Ghana. He was governor from 8 March 1968 to 28 February 1973.

Government offices
Preceded by A. Adomako	Governor of Bank of Ghana; 1968–1973	Succeeded by Amon Nikoi
