= Ernest Addison =

Ghanaian economist

Governor of the Bank of Ghana
- In office March 2017 – February 2025
- President: Nana Akuffo-Addo
- Preceded by: Nashiru Issahaku
- Succeeded by: Johnson Pandit Asiama

Personal details
- Born: Ernest Kwamina Yedu Addison; 1963 (age 62–63) Ghana
- Education: Mfantsipim School, University of Ghana, Cambridge University, McGill University
- Occupation: Banker
- Profession: Economist

Ernest Kwamina Yedu Addison (born 1963) is a Ghanaian economist who served as the 15th governor of the Bank of Ghana. He had previously worked at the same central bank as director of research from 2003 to 2011, and as an economist at the African Development Bank.

== Early life and education ==
Addison attended Mfantsipim School, a Methodist college in Cape Coast with alumni such as former UN Secretary General Kofi Annan. After Mfanstipim he went to the University of Ghana for his Bachelor of Arts degree in economics from 1982 to 1986. He proceeded to Cambridge University for his Master of Economics from 1987 to 1989. In 1993, he obtained his Doctor of Philosophy (Ph.D.) degree in economics from McGill University. His Ph.D. dissertation, done under the direction of John Kurien, studied the Macroeconomic implications of sectoral policy incentives under structural adjustment: a general equilibrium analysis of sectoral terms of trade changes in the Ghanaian economy.

== Career ==
After completing his doctorate at McGill, Addison returned to Ghana and joined the Bank of Ghana in 1994 as an economist. He rose through the ranks to become the Deputy Chief and Head of the Economic Analysis and Policy Division of the Research Department. During his tenure at the bank he was a member of several committees including the Open Market Operations Committee, Money Market Auction Committee and the Editorial Committee and also secretary to the Financial Programme Implementation Committee and the Financial Policies Committee.

He chaired an Economic Community of West African States Task Force set up by the Authority of Heads of State of ECOWAS to perform feasibility studies culminating in the setting up of the West African Monetary Institute. Addison served as the chief economist with the West African Monetary Institute from 2000 to 2003. Prior to leaving the Bank of Ghana, he worked under Kwesi Amissah-Arthur, who was then its governor and later became vice-president of Ghana. In 2012, Addison was a lead economist at the African Development Bank's Southern African Resource Centre in Pretoria, South Africa.

=== Governor of the Bank of Ghana ===
In March 2017, Nana Addo Danquah Akufo-Addo, the president of Ghana, forwarded Addison's name to the Council of State for consideration and approval as the governor of the Bank of Ghana. This was to fill the vacancy left by the resignation of the then governor Dr. Abdul Nashiru Issahaku. He was subsequently approved and then appointed as the governor of the Bank of Ghana on 1 April 2017 with a 4-year tenure which ended in March 2021.

In February 2021, President Akufo-Addo reappointed him as the governor of the Bank of Ghana and renewed his tenure for another 4 years, awaiting for approval by the Council of State.

Under his leadership in mid-2026, the bank expresseed strong confidence that cedi stability will endure as pressure from the US dollar erased.

== Other positions ==
As central bank governor, Addison automatically served as a member on many Government of Ghana and international agencies that deal with financial policy and management, including

- International Monetary Fund (IMF), ex officio member of the board of governors
- Ghana Interbank Payment and Settlement Systems Limited (GhIPSS), ex-officio chairman of the board
- Ghana Cocoa Board, member
- Financial Stability Board (FSB), member of the Regional Consultative Group for Sub-Saharan Africa

Government offices
Preceded by Nashiru Issahaku	Governor of Bank of Ghana; 2017– {{s-Johnson Pandit Asiama}}
