= Kofi Wampah =

Ghanaian economist

Dr. Henry Akpenamawu Kofi Wampah
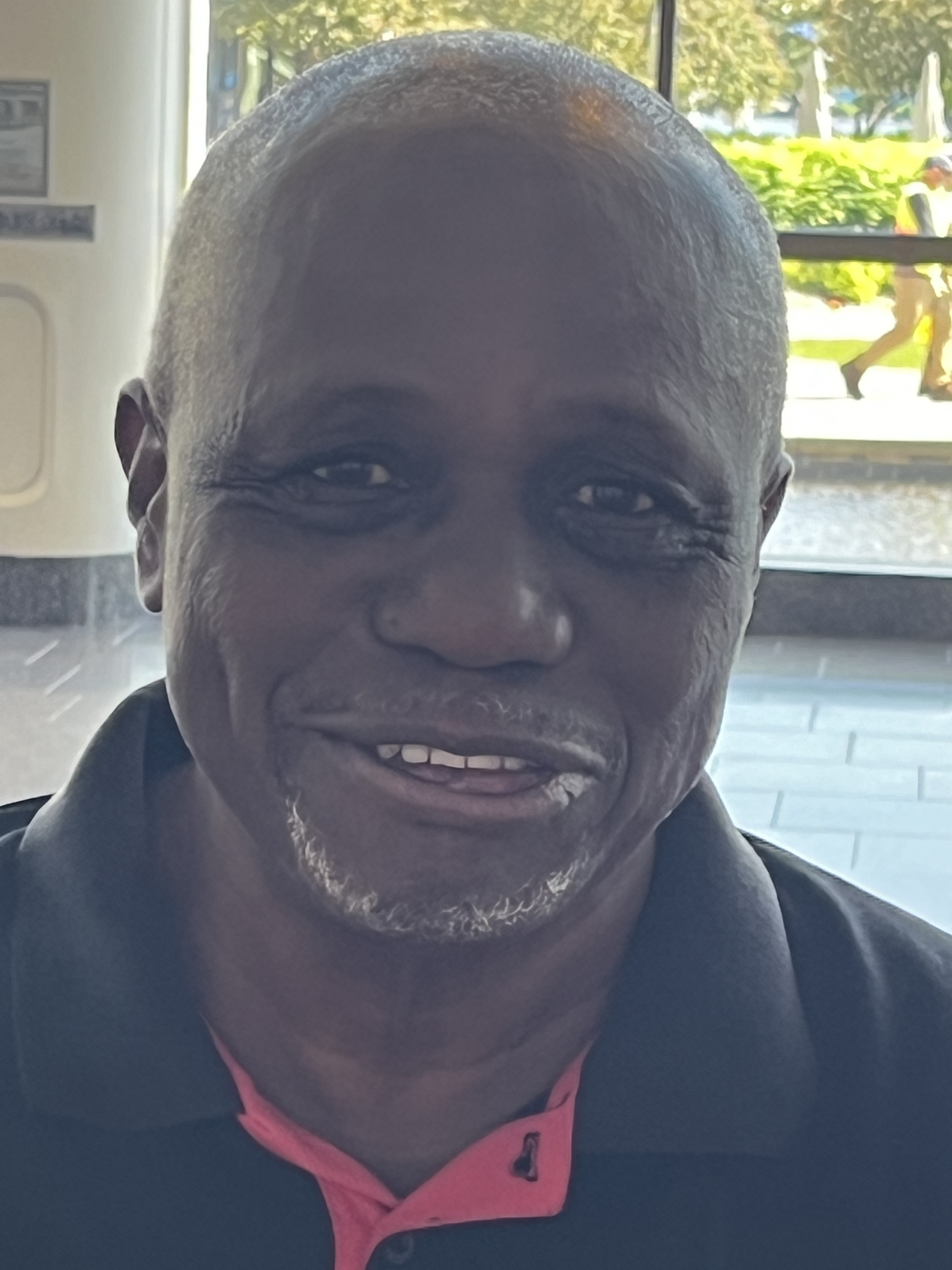
- Education: Hohoe E. P. Secondary School; Konongo-Odumase Secondary School
- Alma mater: University of Ghana; McGill University
- Occupations: Economist; Former governor of the Bank of Ghana
- Children: 4

Henry Akpenamawu Kofi Wampah is a Ghanaian economist and former Governor of the Bank of Ghana.

== Academic background ==
Wampah schooled at Hohoe E. P. Secondary School for his GCE 'O' Level certificate and Konongo-Odumase Secondary School for his GCE 'A' Level certificate. He proceeded to the University of Ghana where he obtained his degree in Economics and Statistics in 1977. Dr Wampah holds a master's degree (1983) and a PhD (1986) in Economics from McGill University, Montreal, Canada.

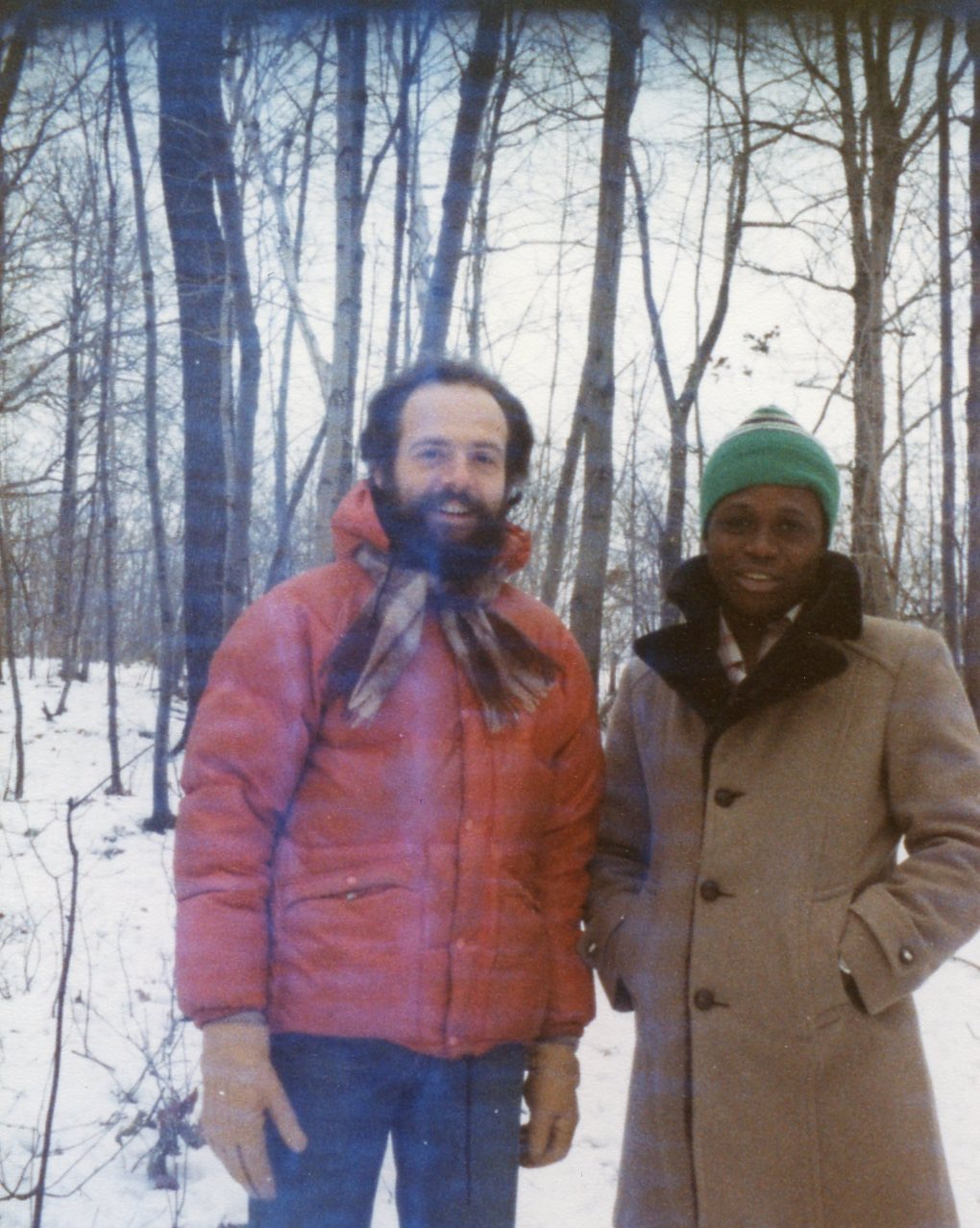
Photo of Dr. Kofi Wampah and Wes Darou on Mount Royal, above McGill University, when Dr. Wampah was a graduate student.

== Professional life ==
Wampah started his working life at the Bank of Ghana in September 1986. His first appointment was as a Deputy Manager of the Bank. From February 2001 to February 2006 he was the Head of the Research Department of the Bank. During this period he worked as part-time staff at the International Monetary Fund (IMF), Washington, D.C., as a special appointee from May to December 1998 and thereafter with the Monetary Operations Division of the Monetary and Exchange Affairs Department and the Africa Department. In 2002, he was appointed director of the Research and Statistics Department at the West African Monetary Institute. While at the Institute he oversaw the planning and implementation of the Macroeconomic Convergence monitoring programme of the West African Monetary Zone. Wampah served first as the Acting Chairman of Ghana International Bank Public Limited Company and the Director from 25 November 2009.

== Governorship ==
In April 2009 he returned to the Bank and became the first deputy governor of the Bank of Ghana by appointment of President John Evans Atta Mills. In 2012 he was appointed as the Acting Governor of the Bank of Ghana. This was because when President Mills died, his vice-president, John Mahama, took over as president. Kwesi Amissah-Arthur, the then Governor of the Bank of Ghana, was confirmed by the Parliament of Ghana as vice-president of Ghana, creating a vacancy in the Bank's leadership. On 4 April 2013, he was sworn in as the substantive Governor of the Bank of Ghana by President John Dramani Mahama. He served until 2017.

A prolific speaker, Wampah has presented before numerous national and international fora, particularly in the areas of monetary policy, public finance, and development economics. He is currently the Chairman of Central Bank Governors in West Africa. He replaced the head of the Nigerian Central Bank, Sanusi Lamido Sanusi. As chair of this subregional group, he coordinates the activities of central bank governors from five other countries namely Nigeria, Sierra Leone, Gambia, Liberia and Guinea.

Preceded by Kwesi Amissah-Arthur	Governor of the Bank of Ghana; 2009–2015	Succeeded by Nashiru Issahaku
