= Anglo Continental Holidays Ltd v Typaldos Lines (London) Ltd =

English contract law case

Anglo Continental Holidays Ltd. v. Typaldos Lines (London) Ltd. is a notable English legal case with a judgement by Lord Denning which clarified much of the common law relating to small print conditions.

A trip was advertised for the Atlantica (with two swimming pools and spacious accommodation) but the line substituted the much smaller Angelika. Tapaldos Lines also shortened a two-day call at Haifa, Israel to just eight hours. The line referred to a clause in the passenger contract that indicated, "..steamers, sailing, rates and itineraries are subject to change without prior notice." The court ruled that the substitution was a radical departure from the performance of the contract and granted monetary damages to the plaintiffs. Denning said: "In my opinion a steamship company cannot rely on a clause of this kind so as to alter the substance of the transaction..." The case is still cited in legal opinions regarding injury to commercial reputation.

The case is very relevant today where it is often customary and expected that after the act of purchase of a piece of technology the customer will agree to a huge amount of conditions which they assume are fair.

If the person receiving the ticket did not see or know that there was any writing on the ticket, he is not bound by the conditions; If he knew there was writing, and knew or believed that the writing contained conditions, then he is bound by the conditions; If he knew there was writing on the ticket, but did not know or believe that the writing contained conditions, nevertheless he would be bound, if the delivering of the ticket to him in such a manner that he could see there was writing upon it, was reasonable notice that the writing contained conditions.
