= Johnson Pandit Asiama =

Ghanaian economist and central banker

Governor of the Bank of Ghana
- Incumbent
- Assumed office February 2025
- Preceded by: Ernest Addison

Personal details
- Born: May 5, 1968 (age 58) Ghana
- Education: University of Southampton
- Occupation: Central banker
- Profession: Economist

Johnson Pandit Asiama is a Ghanaian economist and central banker who became Governor of the Bank of Ghana in February 2025. He previously served in senior roles at the Bank of Ghana, including Second Deputy Governor.

== Early life and education ==
Asiama holds a PhD in economics from the University of Southampton. He is from Kpalime Duga in Ghana’s Volta Region.

== Career ==
Asiama has held various senior positions at the Bank of Ghana prior to his appointment as Governor. His work has focused on monetary policy formulation, financial sector regulation, and financial stability management.

He has been associated with the Bank’s Monetary Policy Committee and has participated in decisions relating to interest rate policy and inflation management. Asiama has worked at the Bank of Ghana for over two decades in roles related to research, banking supervision, and monetary policy. He served as Second Deputy Governor between April 2016 and January 2018.

== Governorship of the Bank of Ghana ==
At his first Monetary Policy Committee meeting as governor in March 2025, Asiama said inflation remained "uncomfortably high" and called for a policy stance that supported disinflation without undermining the economic recovery. Asiama has also addressed issues relating to currency stability and monetary policy management. He has highlighted the role of media engagement in economic communication and discussed the licensing of non-interest banking in Ghana.

Asiama was appointed Governor of the Bank of Ghana in February 2025, succeeding Ernest Addison. His tenure has included oversight of monetary policy, banking sector regulation, and financial stability measures.

He has addressed issues relating to enforcement of foreign exchange regulations and financial sector reforms.

As Governor of the Bank of Ghana, Asiama has been involved in banking sector reforms aimed at strengthening financial stability.

== Legal matters ==
Prior to his appointment as governor, Asiama was involved in legal proceedings relating to Ghana’s banking sector crisis. In January 2025, the attorney-general discontinued the case.
