= Minister for Foreign Affairs (Ghana) =

Ghanaian government official

The Minister for Foreign Affairs is a government official responsible for overseeing the foreign policy and international diplomacy of Ghana. Currently Samuel Okudzeto Ablakwa, the minister is usually one of the most senior members of Cabinet. Under pre-1992 military regimes in Ghana, the title minister has been replaced by commissioner or secretary.

During the government rule of Nana Akufo-Addo of the New Patriotic Party between January 2017 and January 2025, the ministry was combined with other portfolios to form the Ministry of Foreign Affairs and Regional Integration under Shirley Ayorkor Botchwey. On 18 September 2025, the ministry awarded diplomatic passport to the following Ghanaians, Ibrahim Mahama, Wade Maya, Rocky Dawuni, Anita Erskine and Dentaa.

== List of ministers ==
=== Ministers of External Affairs ===
Number	Minister	Took office	Left office	Government	Party
1	Kwame Nkrumah (MP)	1957	1958	Nkrumah government	Convention Peoples' Party
2	Kojo Botsio (MP)	1958	1959	Nkrumah government	Convention Peoples' Party
3	Ako Adjei (MP)	1959	1960	Nkrumah government	Convention Peoples' Party
4	Imoru Egala (MP)	1960	1961	Nkrumah government	Convention Peoples' Party

=== Ministers of Foreign Affairs ===
Number	Minister	Took office	Left office	Government	Party
1	Ako Adjei (MP)	1961	1962	Nkrumah government	Convention Peoples' Party
2	Kwame Nkrumah	1962	1963	Nkrumah government	Convention Peoples' Party
3	Kojo Botsio (MP)	1963	1965	Nkrumah government	Convention Peoples' Party
4	Alex Quaison-Sackey	1965	24 February 1966	Nkrumah government	Convention Peoples' Party
5	Lt. Gen. Joseph A. Ankrah	1966	1967	National Liberation Council	Military government
6	John Willie Kofi Harlley	1967	1968	National Liberation Council	Military government
7	Patrick Dankwa Anin (MP)	1969	1969	Busia government	Progress Party
8	Victor Owusu (MP)	1969	1969	Busia government	Progress Party
9	Patrick Dankwa Anin (MP)	1969	1969	Busia government	Progress Party
10	Victor Owusu (MP)	1969	1971	Busia government	Progress Party
11	William Ofori Atta (MP)	1971	13 January 1972	Busia government	Progress Party
12	Major General Nathan Apea Aferi	1972	1972	National Redemption Council	Military government
13	Lt. Colonel Kwame R.M. Baah	1972	1975	National Redemption Council	Military government
14	Colonel Roger Felli	1975	4 June 1979	Supreme Military Council	Military government
15	Mrs. Gloria Amon Nikoi	1979	24 September 1979	Armed Forces Revolutionary Council	Military government
16	Isaac Chinebuah	1979	31 December 1981	Limann government	Peoples National Party
17	Obed Asamoah	1982	6 January 1993	Provisional National Defence Council	Military government
18	Obed Asamoah	7 January 1993	1997	Rawlings government	National Democratic Congress
19	Kwamena Ahwoi (acting)	1997	1997	Rawlings government	National Democratic Congress
20	James Victor Gbeho	1997	6 January 2001	Rawlings government	National Democratic Congress
21	Hackman Owusu-Agyeman (MP)	2001	2003	Kufuor government	New Patriotic Party
22	Nana Addo Dankwa Akufo-Addo (MP)	2003	July 2007	Kufuor government	New Patriotic Party
23	Akwasi Osei-Adjei (MP)	2007	7 January 2009	Kufuor government	New Patriotic Party
24	Muhammad Mumuni	2009	24 July 2012	Mills government	National Democratic Congress
24	Muhammad Mumuni	24 July 2012	6 January 2013	Mahama government	National Democratic Congress
25	Hanna Tetteh (MP)	30 January 2013	6 January 2017	Mahama government	National Democratic Congress
26	Shirley Ayorkor Botchwey (MP)	28 January 2017	6 January 2025	Akufo-Addo government	New Patriotic Party
27	Samuel Okudzeto Ablakwa	7 February 2025	incumbent	Mahama government from 2025	National Democratic Congress (Ghana)

== See also ==
- Ministers of the Ghanaian Government
- List of current foreign ministers
- Foreign relations of Ghana
- List of ambassadors and high commissioners of Ghana

== External links and sources ==
- Ministry of Foreign Affairs and Regional Integration, official Website
- Current Minister for Foreign Affairs on the Ghana government website
- Rulers.org - Foreign Ministers
