= Albert Adomakoh =

Albert Adomakoh (8 April 1922 – 16 August 2016) was an economist and a Governor of the Bank of Ghana.

Mr Adomakoh was the inaugural managing director for the World Investment Bank.He also held the position of commissioner for agriculture under the national liberation council government. Additionally, he served as Assistant Director-general at the Food and Agriculture organisation of the United Nation and worked as an investment director at the World Bank.

He was governor from 10 September 1965 to 9 February 1968.

Government offices
Preceded by W.M.Q. Halm	Governor of Bank of Ghana; 1965–1968	Succeeded by J.H. Frimpong-Ansah
