= Savings and Loans Company =

Legal term in Ghanaian finance

Savings and Loans Company is a statutory term used for non-bank financial institutions in Ghana. There are 37 Savings and Loans Companies released by the Bank of Ghana as at January 2017. Such institutions are licensed by the Bank of Ghana under the Financial Institutions non-Banking Law 1993 (PNDC Law 328).

== Activities ==
A savings and loans limited is a financial institution that specializes in accepting savings deposits and making mortgage and other loans. They are also known as thrift institutions in the United States, United Kingdom, Ireland and some Commonwealth countries. It is a system of banking (even though it is not a bank) where depositors and borrowers are members with voting rights, and has the ability to direct the financial and managerial goals of the organization. According to Dr. Emmanuel O. Owusu, the president of the Ghana Association of Savings and Loans Companies (GHASALC), savings and loans companies are classified under the first – tier of the Non – Banking Act. Savings and Loans Companies can operate deposit, current, and savings accounts; receive and clear checks through their sister banking institutions; and offer a wide range of credit facilities and money transfer services. Notwithstanding of these, savings and loans companies are not allowed to operate foreign accounts.
