= Controller and Accountant General (Ghana) =

Head of Ghana's Controller and Accountant-General's Department

Controller and Accountant-General’s Department
- CAGD

Agency overview
- Formed: 1885 (as Treasury); 1937 (as Accountant-General’s Dept.); 1967 (as CAGD)
- Jurisdiction: Government of Ghana
- Headquarters: Accra, Ghana
- Employees: Over 6,000 (approx.)
- Agency executive: Kwasi Agyei, Controller and Accountant General
- Parent department: Ministry of Finance (Ghana)
- Website: www.cagd.gov.gh

The Controller and Accountant General (CAG) is the head of the Controller and Accountant-General's Department), a civil service department under the Ministry of Finance of the Republic of Ghana. The office is responsible for preparing and managing public accounts, controlling expenditures, administering salary payments, and serving as the government's chief accounting officer.

== History ==
The department was established in 1885 during the pre-independence era of the Gold Coast, originally known as the "Treasury". In 1937, it was renamed the "Accountant-General’s Department". It acquired its current designation; Controller and Accountant-General's Department in 1967, reflecting expanded responsibilities in financial control and budget execution. It operates under the Civil Service Act, 1960 (CA. 5), the 1992 Constitution of the Republic of Ghana, and the Public Financial Management Act, 2016 (Act 921).

== Organizational structure ==
The Controller and Accountant-General's Department operates under the Ministry of Finance and oversees multiple directorates responsible for payroll, pensions, national accounts, financial monitoring, treasury, public debts, and ICT management. It also serves as the chief advisor to the Minister of Finance on accounting and public finance matters.

== List of controllers and accountant generals ==
- Kwasi Kwaning-Bosompem – served for nearly five years before resigning in early 2024.
- Kwasi Agyei – appointed acting Controller and Accountant-General on 15 April 2024.

== See also ==
- Ghana Civil Service
- Auditor-General of Ghana
