= Alfred Eggleston =

Ghanaian economist

Alfred Eggleston CBE (born 1901, date of death unknown) was an economist and the first Governor of the Bank of Ghana. He served as Governor of the Bank of Ghana from August 1957 to April 1959.
