= Old Tafo (Ghana parliament constituency) =

Constituency in the Ashanti Region of Ghana

- constituency for the Parliament of Ghana
- District: Kumasi Metropolitan Assembly
- Region: Ashanti Region of Ghana

Current constituency
- Party: New Patriotic Party
- MP: Vincent Ekow Assafuah

Old Tafo is one of the constituencies represented in the Parliament of Ghana. It elects one Member of Parliament (MP) by the first past the post system of election

Vincent Ekow Assafuah is the member of parliament for the constituency. He was elected on the ticket of the New Patriotic Party (NPP) and won the 2020 December parliamentary elections for the Old Tafo Constituency. He was declared the winner with 42,616 votes representing 74.55% against his closest contender Sahmudeen Mohammed Kamil of the National Democratic Congress (NDC) who had 14,405 votes representing 25.20%.

== See also ==
- List of Ghana Parliament constituencies
