= Chapman v Hearse =

Judgement of the High Court of Australia

- Court: High Court of Australia
- Decided: 8 August 1961

Court membership
- Judges sitting: Dixon CJ, Kitto, Taylor and Windeyer JJ

Chapman v Hearse is a significant case in common law related to duty of care, reasonable foreseeability and novus actus interveniens within the tort of negligence. The case concerned three parties; Chapman who drove negligently, Dr Cherry who assisted him on the side of the road, and Hearse who, in driving negligently, killed Dr Cherry while he was assisting Chapman. In the Supreme Court of South Australia, Hearse was found liable for damages to Dr Cherry's estate under the Wrongs Act 1936. Hearse sought to reclaim damages from Chapman due to his alleged contributory negligence; Chapman was found liable to one quarter of the damages. Chapman appealed the case to the High Court of Australia on August 8, 1961, but it was dismissed as the results of his negligence were deemed reasonably foreseeable. A duty of care was established between Chapman and the deceased and his claim of novus actus interveniens was rejected. Dr Cherry was considered a 'rescuer' and his respective rights remained.

== Facts ==
On a dark wet evening in September 1958 Chapman was driving intoxicated and collided with another vehicle. Chapman fell out of his car rendering him unconscious and was noticed by an oncoming driver, Dr Cherry, who stopped and sought to assist Chapman. While attending to the unconscious Chapman another driver - Hearse - unwittingly hit and killed Dr Cherry.

The executor of Dr Cherry's estate sought damages from Hearse under the Wrongs Act 1936. During the case, Hearse stated that if he was found liable he should also receive compensation from Chapman as Dr Cherry would not have been on the road had it not been for Chapmans' contributory negligence. Judge Napier C.J. found Hearse's driving to be negligent and Hearse was ordered to compensate Dr Cherry's family. The trial judge also found that Chapman was liable to make a contribution to Hearse of one quarter of the damages.

Preceding this case between Hearse and Dr. Cherry's estate, Chapman lodged an appeal to the full court of the Supreme Court of South Australia against Hearse on the grounds that he had no duty of care to the deceased and that Hearse's action had broken the chain of causation. Chapman's appeal was dismissed and he appealed his case to the High Court of Australia.

== Issues ==
Chapman v Hearse sought to answer whether or not Chapman (the appellant) owed a duty of care to Dr Cherry which would result in him being free from making contributions to Hearse (the respondent).

The court needed to look at whether Chapman would have been liable in the same suit Hearse faced against the executor of Dr.Cherry's estate. This required considering whether Chapman owed Dr. Cherry a duty of care; whether the separate acts were too remote; and whether the events were reasonable foreseeability.

=== Chapman's arguments ===
- That Chapman owed no duty of care to the plaintiff.
- That the respondent's actions were not reasonably foreseeable.
- That the respondent's negligent actions that resulted in the plaintiff's death were an act of novus actus interveniens, breaking the chain of causation of Chapman's liability.
  - Proving these to be true would make him no longer liable for damages owed to the respondent.

== Judgment ==
=== Reasonable foreseeability ===
The judgement took place on August 8, 1961, in a joint decision by judges Dixon CJ, Kitto, Taylor and Windeyer, JJ. Chapman argued that he owed no duty of care as Dr Cherry's death was a sole result of Hearse's negligent driving; he emphasised that Dr Cherry's death was far too remote to fix Chapman with responsibility and by extension liability for compensation to Hearse or Cherry.

Chapman argued that the likelihood of someone being deposited in the middle of the road, and for the first car to visibly see him be occupied by a doctor who happened to get hit himself while assisting someone, was in no way reasonably foreseeable. In a joint decision made by the judges it was found to be reasonably foreseeable that the events that happened after Chapmans accident were not unlikely to follow between two vehicles on a dark, wet night on a busy highway. The judges also acknowledge that what is 'reasonable and probable' may be, and will continue to be, heavily debated.

The case Overseas Tankship (UK) Ltd v Morts Dock and Engineering Co Ltd (The Wagon Mound) [1961] AC 388 is comparable on its commentary on reasonable foreseeability to Chapman v Hearse. The obiter dicta from Overseas Tankship (UK) Ltd v Morts Dock and Engineering Co Ltd (The Wagon Mound) [1961] AC 388 argued that a reasonable man, concerned for the safety of others would avoid the risk of putting others in harms way. In relation to Chapman v Hearse, it contextualises how the appellant should have considered the implications of his actions on others and whether the result of the appellants negligence (the death of Dr Cherry) was truly reasonably foreseeable. The court also affirmed that while one can forever speculate about the consequences of negligent behaviour one will never know what damages should be attributed to an act until it has actually happened. The High Court made clear that the result of Chapmans negligence could have been anticipated. Specifically, that it is reasonably foreseeable that driving negligently could result in another person being struck. The appellants argument failed here.

=== Novus actus interveniens ===
Chapman argued that Hearse's negligent driving broke the chain of causation that made Chapman liable through a novus actus interveniens, the Latin term for 'new act intervening'. This is when an act is definitely unrelated to those acts which create damage. Chapman's argument was that Hearse's negligent driving singlehandedly caused Dr. Cherry's death, and Chapman's own actions were unrelated intervening acts. If this argument were successful the chain of causation would be broken and Chapman's liability would cease, therefore owing no damaged to Dr Cherry's estate.

The judges rejected Chapman's argument of novus actus interveniens because the "last opportunity" rule existed in the context of the case. The last opportunity rule, or the 'last clear chance' rule, is a doctrine that a negligent plaintiff can invoke where liability can be minimised or recovery can be gained if the defendant had the last opportunity to avoid the accident. The rule applies to the facts of the case as Hearse had the last chance to avoid the accident; had Hearse exercised reasonable care then Chapman would be discharged from all liabilities. Similarly, if Chapman had also been injured from Hearse's driving he would be able to recover all his damages against Hearse as it would be unreasonable for him to make a full recovery and then be expected to pay damages. This factor was a contributory factor which undermined Chapman's novus actus interveniens argument.

"In the course of argument, it was emphasised that Hearse's intervening act was negligent, and it was contended that on the analogy of the last opportunity rule this should relieve Chapman from responsibility. The High Court, while acknowledging that the last opportunity rule had been treated in many cases as if it had assumed the role of a test causation, made clear that the rule only applied in cases where the plaintiffs negligence was in fact a cause of the damage."

The High Court held that because the intervening act was negligent, Chapman would still be liable for damages because "no clean dividing line could be drawn to show that it was not reasonably foreseeable".

== Significance ==
=== Duties to Rescuers ===
When questioning Dr Cherry's intention and considering his preliminary actions when responding to the unconscious Chapman, the judges affirmed that Dr Cherry acted morally and correctly given the situation. It was questioned whether Dr Cherry's actions, and their consequent risk in assisting the appellant were reasonable. While it was decided that Dr Cherry should have taken more care when assisting Chapman, his actions were a result of human nature and a want to assist. Considering Dr Cherry's occupation as a doctor it was reasonable that he fulfilled a moral obligation to a person in need especially considering his ability to aid. This is significant as Dr Cherry's reaction was defined as legitimate; "a person who negligently creates a dangerous situation is liable to the rescuer for any injury sustained by him in aiding the person imperilled".

The judges affirmed that assisting or rescuing should be promoted (although with more caution to oneself when taking the risk). This notion of encouraging rescuers has a longer history, as noted in the ratio and obiter dicta of former Associate Justice of the Supreme Court of the United States Benjamin Cardozo in Wagner v International Railway Co 133 NE 437 (1921): "Danger invites rescue. The wrong that imperils life is a wrong to the imperilled victim; it is a wrong also to his rescuer".

In NSW, the concept of duties to rescuers in the tort of negligence is legislatively enshrined in the NSW Civil Liability Act 2002, in Part 8 (sections 55–58), titled "Good Samaritan"; defining it as "a person who, in good faith and without expectation of payment or other reward, comes to the assistance of a person who is apparently injured or at risk of being injured." The legislation states 'good samaritans' are protected from incurring personal civil liability, with notable exceptions.

=== Reasonable Foreseeability and Duty of Care ===
Chapman v Hearse set a precedent in the interpretation of reasonable foreseeability and the duty of care. Chapman argued that Hearse's negligence was not reasonably foreseeable. In response, the High Court made clear that the reasonable foreseeability was "sufficient in the circumstances of this case to ask whether a consequence of the same general character as that which followed was reasonably foreseeable as one not unlikely to follow a collision between two vehicles on a dark wet night upon a busy highway". Chapman v Hearse advanced on how reasonable foreseeability is defined and applied. Where in previous cases reasonable foreseeability was applied in a narrow sense which tended to include those actions that were rationally predictable, Chapman v Hearse broadly interpreted the definition to include liability for "all damage which is of the same general nature as damage which could have been reasonably foreseen".

The Court held that Chapman owed a duty of care to the doctor as it was reasonably foreseeable to fulfil a moral obligation to come to someones aid:

"…to establish the prior existence of a duty of care with respect to a plaintiff subsequently injured as the result of a sequence of events following a defendant's carelessness it is not necessary for the plaintiff to show that the precise manner in which his injuries were sustained was reasonably foreseeable. It is sufficient if it appears that injury to that class of persons which he was one might reasonably have been foreseen as a consequence".

This is significant as the judges affirmed protections to aiding rescuers. This is also of importance because it reiterated a precedent similar to Overseas Tankship (UK) Ltd v Morts Dock and Engineering Co Ltd (The Wagon Mound) [1961] AC 388, that a person committing a negligent act must consider how their actions will effect others.
