= Kwesi Amissah-Arthur =

Vice-President of Ghana from 2012 to 2017 (1951-2018)

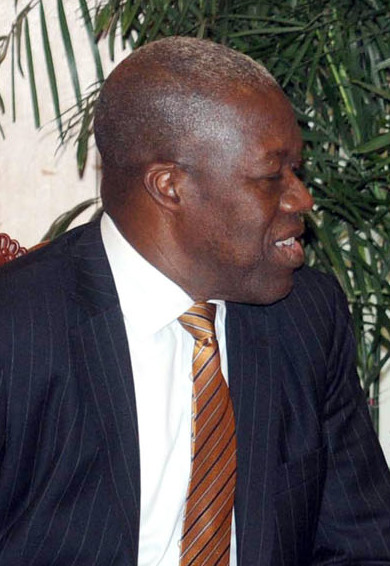
- Amissah-Arthur in 2014

6th Vice President of Ghana
- In office 6 August 2012 – 7 January 2017
- President: John Mahama
- Preceded by: John Mahama
- Succeeded by: Mahamudu Bawumia

12th Governor of Bank of Ghana
- In office 1 October 2009 – 6 August 2012
- President: John Atta Mills
- Preceded by: Paul Acquah
- Succeeded by: Kofi Wampah

Deputy Minister for Finance
- In office April 1993 – March 1997
- President: Jerry Rawlings

Deputy Secretary for Finance and Economic Planning
- In office February 1986 – March 1993
- President: Jerry Rawlings

Personal details
- Born: William Edmund Davidson Amissah-Arthur; 29 April 1951 Cape Coast, Gold Coast
- Died: 29 June 2018 (aged 67) Accra, Ghana
- Party: National Democratic Congress
- Spouse: Matilda Amissah-Arthur
- Children: Kwesi Nyan Amissah-Arthur; Araba Amissah-Arthur
- Education: Mfantsipim School; University of Ghana
- Occupation: Economist; Consultant; Academician; Politician

Paa Kwesi Bekoe Amissah-Arthur (born William Edmund Davidson Amissah-Arthur) (29 April 1951 – 29 June 2018) was a Ghanaian economist, academic and politician who was the sixth vice president of Ghana under President John Mahama from August 2012 until January 2017. Previously he was the 12th governor of the Bank of Ghana from 2009 to 2012.

He was nominated by President John Dramani Mahama to be the vice-president a week after Mahama himself was sworn in. This followed the sudden death of John Atta Mills on 24 July 2012. He was sworn in as vice-president on 6 August 2012, following vetting by the Parliament of Ghana.

== Early life and education ==
Amissah-Arthur was born at Cape Coast on 29 April 1951, the capital of the Central Region of Ghana, at the time organized as British Gold Coast Colony. His mother, Effie Amissah-Arthur is from the Hutchful family while his father, Jabesh Richmond P. Amissah-Arthur, an educator was from the Amissah-Arthur family and served as the second and longest serving headmaster of the Oda Secondary School at Akyem-Oda in the Eastern Region from September 1961 to December, 1977. Both families originated from Cape Coast and are of Fante ethnic origin. Kwesi Amissah-Arthur had five other siblings - one brother and four sisters.

He attended the Aboom Methodist 'B' Primary School in Cape Coast and passed the Common Entrance examination from the Akim Oda Methodist School in 1964. He completed his secondary education at the Mfantsipim School, where he obtained the GCE Ordinary Level in 1969 and the GCE Advanced Level in 1971. At Mfantsipim, he was a resident of Lockhart-Schweitzer House. He proceeded to the University of Ghana at Legon, where he obtained the B.Sc. in 1974 and M.Sc. in 1976, both in Economics.

== Economics and consultancy ==
Amissah-Arthur was a research assistant at the Institute of Statistical, Social and Economic Research between 1974 and 1975. He later joined the Economics Department as a teaching assistant from 1977 to 1978, going on to become an assistant lecturer in 1979. He lectured at the Department of Economics at the University of Ghana between 1980 and 1988. He was also a lecturer at the Department of Economics, Anambra State College of Education, Awka, Anambra State, Nigeria (August 1981 – July 1983).

He went into politics until 1997 when he resigned from the public sector and went into finance and economic consultancy. He worked as a consultant for the World Bank in The Gambia. He also served as a consultant for the Netherlands' government education project in Ghana. He then worked as Senior Economist for the Sigma One Corporation in Ghana between 1998 and 2000. Between 2001 and 2002, he was on assignment for the Ministry of Foreign Affairs of Denmark.

== Politics ==
=== Finance and Economic Planning Portfolio ===
From 1983 to 1986, Amissah-Arthur served as a special assistant to the Secretary of Finance and Economic Planning, Kwesi Botchwey, in the Provisional National Defense Council government. Subsequently, he was Deputy Secretary for Finance in the PNDC government from February 1986 to March 1993. From April 1993, he continued as the Deputy Minister for Finance in the Rawlings government after the establishment of constitutional rule until March 1997. He also served on the board of the erstwhile state-owned Bank for Housing and Construction (BHC).

=== Governor of the Bank of Ghana ===
Amissah-Arthur was appointed as Governor of the Bank of Ghana in October 2009 by President John Atta Mills. He held this position until 6 August 2012, when he became vice-president of Ghana following the death of Atta Mills. He was responsible in ensuring the general development of the national economy, promote by monetary measure the stabilisation of the value of the currency within and outside Ghana and also to formulate and implement monetary policy aimed at achieving the objective of the Bank and Ghana in a whole, among others.

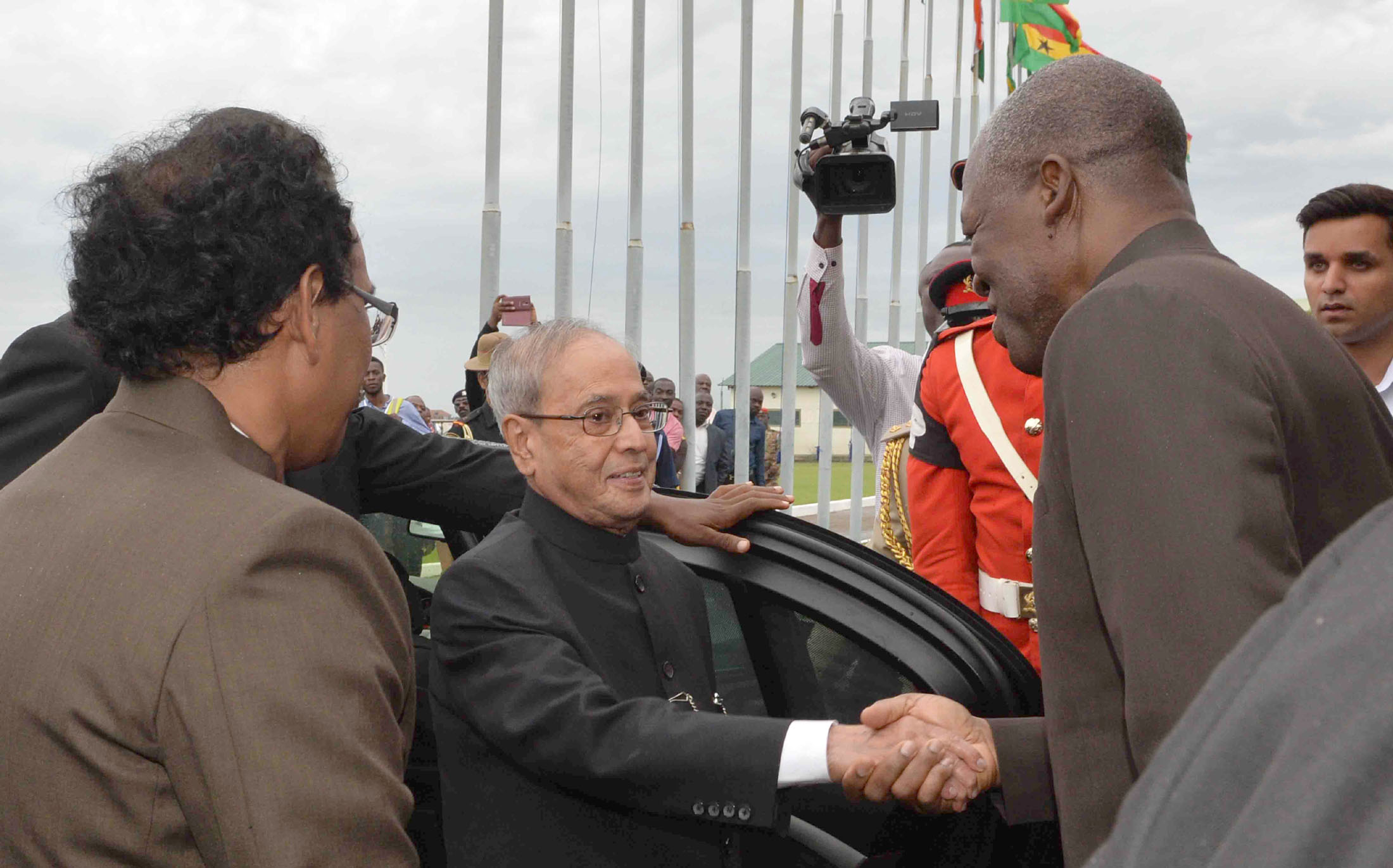
Indian President, Shri Pranab Mukherjee being received by Amissah-Arthur on his arrival, at Kotoka International Airport, in Accra, Ghana on June 12, 2016

=== Vice President of Ghana ===
After the Death of the President John Atta Mills, his successor the then Vice President John Dramani Mahama who had been sworn in as president, named him as his vice president to fill in the gap he had evacuated. He was sworn in as vice president on 6 August 2012 in Parliament by the then Chief Justice Georgina Wood, after going through a vetting process by the Parliament of Ghana. He was maintained by the John Dramani Mahama in his bid to win the 2012 elections as his running mate. John Dramani Mahama won the 2012 Elections by a 50.7% majority of the votes. automatically making him the Vice President-Elect of Ghana. They were sworn in as president and Vice President on 7 January 2013.

== Personal life ==
Amissah-Arthur was married to Matilda Amissah-Arthur with two children, Kwesi, an ophthalmologist-academic and Araba, a lawyer. He was a Christian and was known to worship at the Calvary Methodist Church at Adabraka in Accra. He enjoyed football and playing of Tennis. Due to his love for sports especially football, he was a supporter and a major shareholder in the football club, the Accra Hearts of Oak S.C.

== Death and state funeral ==
Amissah-Arthur died on 29 June 2018 at the 37 Military Hospital after reportedly collapsing at the Air Force Gym during his routine morning workout session. A state funeral, attended by several dignitaries, was held for him on 27 July 2018 at the Accra International Conference Centre after which his body, accompanied by a military cortège, was conveyed to the new Military Cemetery at Burma Camp for interment amid the sounding of the Last Post by army buglers and a 19-gun salute.

== Legacy and memorial ==
The Ghanaian government renamed the Moree Senior High School as Amissah-Arthur Senior High School, Moree in his memory. A learning centre, consisting of a library and an ICT complex, located at Ohawu in the Volta Region was named in his honour. On the occasion of the first anniversary of his death, his family sponsored the establishment of a doctoral fellowship and a research chair at the Department of Economics at the University of Ghana.

== See also ==
- List of Mahama government ministers
- National Democratic Congress

Political offices
Preceded by Paul Acquah	Governor of Bank of Ghana; 2009–2012	Succeeded by Kofi Wampah
Preceded by John Dramani Mahama	Vice-President of Ghana; 2012–2017	Succeeded by Mahamudu Bawumia
Party political offices
Preceded by John Mahama	National Democratic Congress nominee for Vice President of Ghana; 2012, 2016	Succeeded by Jane Naana Opoku-Agyemang
