= Bank of Ghana =

Monetary authority of Ghana

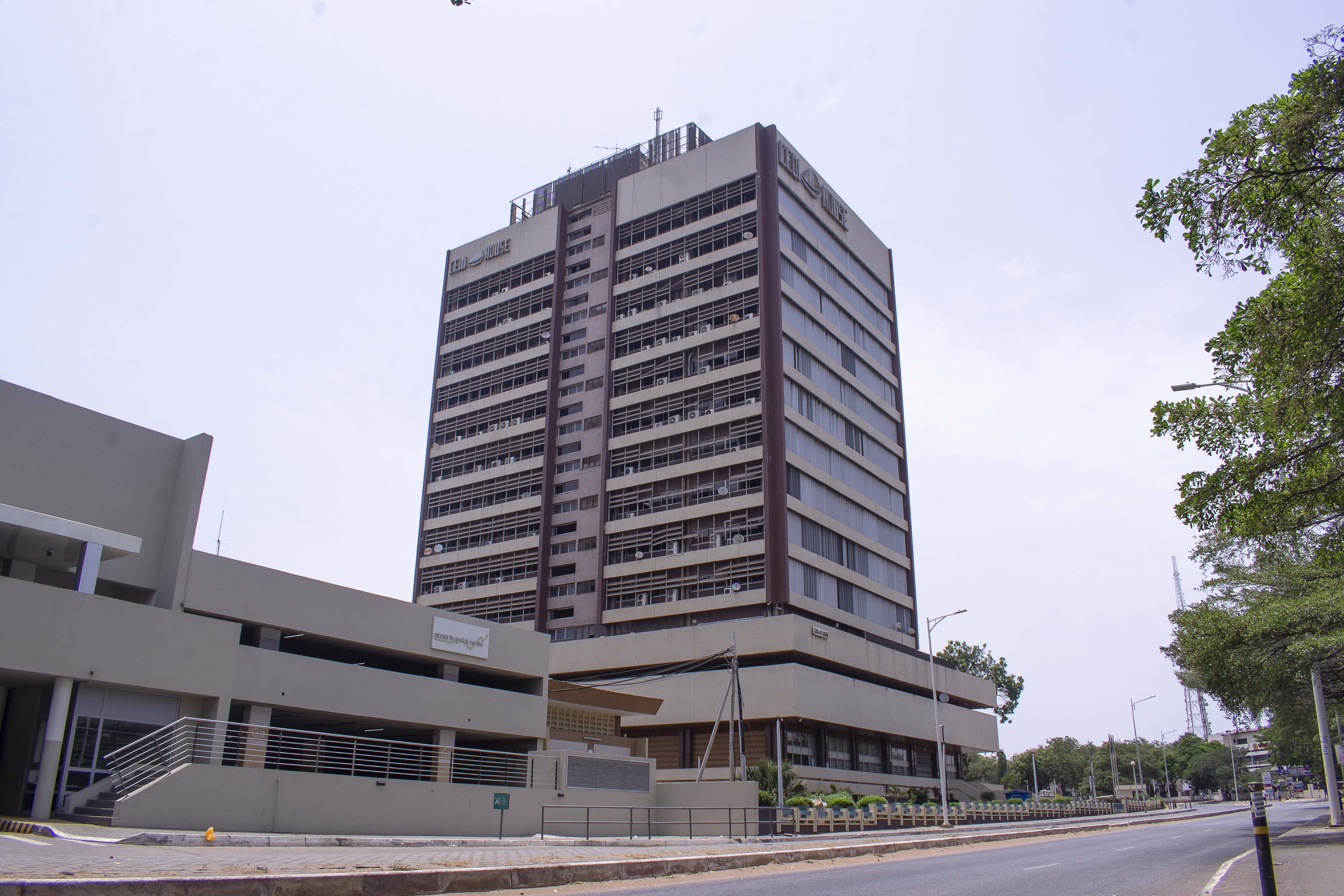
- The Cedi House hosts and the stock exchange.
- Central bank of: Ghana
- Headquarters: Accra, Greater Accra, Ghana
- Established: 1957; 69 years ago
- Ownership: 100% state ownership
- Governor: Dr. Johnson Pandit Asiama.
- Currency: Ghanaian cedi GHS (ISO 4217)
- Website: www.bog.gov.gh

The Bank of Ghana (BoG) is the Central Bank of Ghana. It is located in Accra and was formed in 1957. The Bank of Ghana has Seven Regional Offices in addition to its head office in Accra. The regional offices are located in the following cities, Hohoe, Kumasi, Sunyani, Tamale, Takoradi, Bolgatanga, Wa. The regional offices are responsible for implementing the policies and directives of the Bank of Ghana in their respective regions. They also provide banking services to the government, financial institutions, and the public.

The bank is active in developing financial inclusion policies and is a member of the Alliance for Financial Inclusion.

In mid-2026,the central bank expressed strong confidence that cedi stability will endure as pressure from the US dollar began easing.

== Establishment of the Bank of Ghana ==
The Bank of Ghana was formally established on 4 March 1957, just two days before Ghana's declaration of political independence. The British Parliament passed the Bank of Ghana Ordinance (No. 34) of 1957 to make it official. By mid-July 1957, all necessary preparations were completed for the official inauguration of the Bank's new Head Office on High Street.

Since 1957, the Bank of Ghana has experienced various legislative changes. The original Bank of Ghana Ordinance (No.34) of 1957 was replaced by the Bank of Ghana Act (1963), Act 182, which was later amended by the Bank of Ghana (Amendment Act) 1965, (Act 282). Eventually, the Bank of Ghana Law, 1992 PNDCL 291, consolidated the legal framework for the bank by repealing both Acts 182 and 282.

== History ==
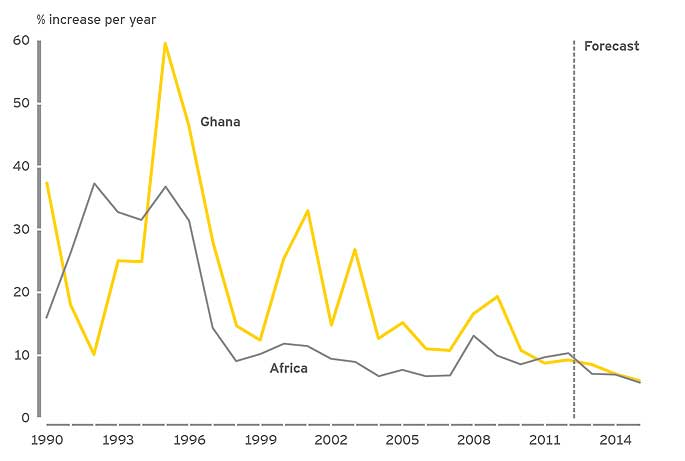
Ghana economical inflation rate of change in percentage

The Central Bank of Ghana traces its roots to the Bank of the Gold Coast (BGC) or Ghana Commercial Bank, where it was nurtured. As soon as local politicians and economists saw political independence in sight in the mid-1950s the agitation for a central bank was revived. It was argued that a central bank was one institution which would give true meaning to political independence. It may be recalled that way back in 1947, some leading politicians had called for the establishment of a national bank, with central bank functions to act as banker to government and to cater for the indigenous sector of the economy.

Proposals of the advocates for a central bank were accepted and in early 1955, another select committee was set up by the government to take a new look at the Trevor Report and prepare the grounds for the establishment of a central bank in Ghana. The BGC had already set the stage for central banking: all that was needed was specially trained personnel in central banking and suitable accommodation for the bank to take off.

By the end of 1956, all was set for the establishment of the Bank of Ghana. A new and modern five-storey building had been put up on the High Street, adjacent to the Accra Metropolitan Assembly (AMA) to house both the Bank of Ghana and the Ghana Commercial Bank (GCB).

In March 2012, the Bank of Ghana announced it would be making specific commitments to financial inclusion under the Maya Declaration.

== Governance of the Bank of Ghana ==
The first governor of the bank was Mr. Alfred Eggleston, the former managing director of BGC and an accomplished Scottish banker on secondment to Ghana from the Imperial Bank of India. His deputy governor was one Mr. Douglas F. Stone, another renowned British central banker also on secondment from Bank of England.

The general administration of the bank was entrusted in the hands of a seven-member board of directors under the chairmanship of the governor.

The first board was as follows:

1. Alfred Eggleston, chairman
2. Douglas F. Stone, deputy governor
3. R. S. Blay, director
4. N. T. Clerk, director
5. C. E. Osei, director
6. R. C. Parkin, director

The governor of the bank and his deputy were appointed by the governor of the Gold Coast on the recommendation of the prime minister, in accordance with Section 10 (1) of the 1957 Ordinance. The governor and his deputy were each appointed for a term of five years and were eligible for reappointment. Those two officials were answerable to the board for their acts and decisions in the course of general administration of the affairs of the bank. The board itself was also answerable to the Ministry of Finance for efficient management of the bank. The other directors of the board were also appointed by the Prime Minister with the approval of the governor of the Gold Coast for a term of three years, subject to renewal.

=== Governors ===
The following is a list of governors till date

- Alfred Eggleston 1 August 1957 – 3 April 1959
- Hubert Kessels 21 August 1959 – 8 September 1962
- W.M.Q. Halm 5 October 1962 – 13 August 1965
- A. Adomako 10 September 1965 – 9 February 1968
- J.H. Frimpong-Ansah 8 March 1968 – 28 February 1973
- Amon Nikoi 16 March 1973 – June 1977
- A.E.K. Ashiabor 15 Jul 1977–8 Mar 1983
- J. S. Addo 29 March 1983 – 3 June 1987
- G.K. Agama 15 July 1988 – 16 July 1997
- Kwabena Duffuor 17 July 1997 – 30 September 2001
- Paul A. Acquah 1 October 2001 – 30 September 2009
- K. B. Amissah-Arthur 1 October 2009 – 6 August 2012
- Henry Kofi Wampah 6 August 2012 – 31 March 2016
- Abdul Nashiru Issahaku 1 April 2016 – 31 March 2017
- Ernest Addison 1 April 2017 – 2025
- Johnson Pandit Asiama 3 February 2025 – Present

== Departments ==
In 1957, the bank commenced business with six main departments namely:

- The governors' office
- The administration/personnel department
- The banking department
- The issue department
- Accounts/audit department
- Economics/statistics department

The governors' office was headed by the secretary to the board, while the other departments were headed by managers who reported directly to the deputy governor or in special cases to the governor. The departments were run by the managers in accordance, with policies and decisions arrived at by an in-house management accordance with policies arrived at by an in-house management committee comprising the governor, the deputy governor and three or four heads of department appointed by the governor.

With that initial organisational arrangements, the Bank of Ghana assumed its central role in the banking system of Ghana, which then comprised the central bank, two expatriate commercial banks – the British Bank of West Africa (BBWA) (now Standard Chartered Bank) and Barclays Bank Limited (Dominion, Colonial and Overseas); and the new Ghana Commercial Bank (GCB).

There was also the Post Office Savings Bank (POSB), which was in fact, not a bank by definition; it was only an institution set up by the government to mobilize public savings through the agency of the numerous post offices in the country, for investment in government paper.

Relations with the other banks in the system were set out under sections 39 – 42 of the 1957 Ordinance. Initially, the relation were not very strong. The Central Bank was to act as banker to other banks and co-operate with them to promote and maintain adequate and reasonable banking services for the public. It was also to ensure high standards of conduct and management in the banking system. The bank was also given powers to require the banks to maintain a proportion of their assets in specified form and to submit monthly returns on their operation to the Central Bank. However, banking supervision or bank examination was not specifically highlighted in the Ordinance.

The bank's FinTech head emphasized in 2026 that mobile money transaction histories should be leveraged to unlock loans and insurance structures for informal sector workers.

== Functions ==
As a Central Bank of Ghana, it function is as follows:

- Formulate and implement a monetary policy aimed at achieving the objectives of the Bank;
- Promote by monetary measure the stabilization of the value of the currency within and outside Ghana;
- Institute measures that are likely to have a favorable effect on the balance of payments, the state of public finances, and the general development of the national economy;
- Regulate, supervise, and direct the banking and credit system and ensure the smooth operation of the financial sector;
- Promote, regulate, and supervise payment and settlement systems;
- Issue and redeem the currency notes and coins;
- Ensure effective maintenance and management of Ghana's external financial services;
- license, regulate, promote, and supervise non-banking financial institutions;
- Act as banker and financial adviser to the Government;
- Promote and maintain relations with international banking and financial institutions and subject to the Constitution or any other relevant enactment, implement international monetary agreements to which Ghana is a party; and
- Do all other things that are incidental or conducive to the efficient performance of its functions under this Act and any other enactment.
- In 2026,the bank reported a 40% drop in internal staff fraud though cash theft remained a persistent industry issue.

== Bank of Ghana in the news ==
=== Lawsuits ===
==== Dr. Papa Kwesi Nduom and the Others ====
In August 2019, Dr. Papa Kwesi Nduom and other individuals filed a lawsuit against the Bank of Ghana and other parties concerning the cancellation of the license of GN Bank/Savings.

The Bank of Ghana disputed the High Court's jurisdiction by asserting that, as per the Banking Act, license revocation matters should be resolved through arbitration instead of court proceedings.

=== Controversies ===
==== New Bank of Ghana Headquarters ====
In August 2023, the Bank of Ghana through a press briefing described with justifications, its move to building a new headquarters to replace its current building. The Bank of Ghana in Accra released a document on August 21, 2023, containing this disclosure.

The decision to build the new edifice was met with mixed reactions as the Minority in Parliament of Ghana and some Civil Society Organizations strongly opposed the new building, stating that such projects are unnecessary given the current economic situation of the country. Consequently, they criticized the Governor of the Bank of Ghana and his deputies, urging them to step down and declared their plan to stage a protest at the Bank of Ghana on September 5, 2023, seeking the departure of these officials.

Other distinguished members of the society including the Dormaahene, Osagyefo Oseadeeyo Agyemang Badu II have also expressed their reservations towards the decision of the Bank of Ghana's leadership.

On the other side, the Deputy Minister for Trade, Dr Stephen Amoah, called the action of those calling for the resignation of the governor as unnecessary.

== Awards and honours ==
In October 2020, the Bank of Ghana was adjudged the best central bank at the seventh Central Banking Awards.

== See also ==
- Savings and Loans Company
- Cedi, the currency of Ghana
- Central banks and currencies of Africa
- Economy of Ghana
- List of financial institutions in Ghana
- List of central banks
- List of financial supervisory authorities by country
