= List of MPs elected in the 1979 Ghanaian parliamentary election =

Colonial Era
1951 Assembly	(election)
1954 Assembly	(election)
1956 Assembly	(election)
First Republic
1957 Parliament	(election)
1965 Parliament	(election)
Second Republic
1969 Parliament	(election)
Third Republic
1979 Parliament	(election)
Fourth Republic
1st Parliament	(1992)
2nd Parliament	(1996)
3rd Parliament	(2000)
4th Parliament	(2004)
5th Parliament	(2008)
6th Parliament	(2012)
7th Parliament	(2016)
8th Parliament	(2020)
9th Parliament	(2024)

The election of Members of Parliament (MPs) to the Parliament of the Third Republic was held on 18 June 1979.

== Current composition ==
Affiliation	Members
People's National Party	71
Popular Front Party	42
United National Convention	13
Action Congress Party	10
Social Democratic Front	3
Independent	1
Total	140
Government Majority	2

== List of MPs elected in the general election ==
The following table is a list of MPs elected on 18 June 1979, ordered by region and constituency. The previous MP and previous party column shows the MP and party holding the seat prior to the election.

Table of contents:

Ashanti Region • Brong Ahafo Region • Central Region • Eastern Region • Greater Accra Region
Northern Region • Upper Region • Volta Region • Western Region
Postponed polls • Changes • By-elections • Notes and References • See also • External links and sources

=== Ashanti Region - 22 seats ===
Constituency	Elected MP	Elected Party	Majority
Adansi	Samuel Asante-Fosuhene	PFP	
Asokwa	Osei Asibey	PNP	
Obuasi	F. K. Mensah	PNP	
Atwima Nwabagya	John Kufuor	PFP	
Asante-Akim North	Nana Akuoko Sarpong	PFP	
Afigwa Kwabre	Kwadwo Ofori-Kuragu	PFP	
Agona Kwabre	Isaac Kwasi Boakye	PFP	
Ahafo Ano	John Asante	PFP	
Amansie Central	K. P. Agyekum	PFP	
Amansie East	Kwame Adum-Atta	PFP	
Amansie West	Joseph Kofi Obeng	PFP	
Atwima Amansie	Yaw Joseph Owusu	PFP	
Atwima Mponua	Daniel Donkor	PFP	
Asante-Akim South	Sampson Kwaku Boafo	PFP	
Bantama	Kwabena Adai Mensah	PFP	
Juaben Ejisu	John Emmanuel Amoah	PFP	
Manhyia	Charles Amankwah	PFP	
Mampong North	Gen. A. A. Afrifa (deceased)	UNC	
Mampong South	Kwadwo Okyere Mpiani	PFP	
Offinso	Kwadwo Takyi-Berko	PFP	
Sekyere	Basoa Reo Addai	PFP	
Subin	T. K. Aboagye	PFP	
=== Brong Ahafo Region - 12 seats ===
Constituency	Elected MP	Elected Party	Majority
Techiman	Gyewu Baafour Osafo	PFP	
Kwame Danso	J. E. Adarkwa- Yiadom	PNP	
Asunafo	Alfred Badu-Nkansah	PFP	
Asutifi	Thomas Broni	PFP	
Atebubu	Abdul Rahman Mohammed	PNP	
Berekum	J. H. Owusu-Acheampong	PFP	
Dormaa	S. A. Manson	PFP	
Jaman	Martin Adane	PFP	
Nkoranza	Kwadwo Apeah-Kubi	PFP	
Sunyani	Kwadwo Owusu-Sekyere	Indp.	
Tano	Badu Kyet	PFP	
Wenchi West	Joseph K. Amankwah	PFP	
=== Central Region - 15 seats ===
Constituency	Elected MP	Elected Party	Majority
Agona	Haizel S. Kwesi	PNP	
Assin	Ebeneezer A. Anti	PNP	
Denkyira	Agatha A. Awuah	PNP	
Efutu	Kow N. Arkaah	PNP	
Ekumfi	James Kow Rockson	PNP	
Gomoa Akyempim	Kankam da Costa	PNP	
Swedru	Emmanuel K. B. Mintah	PNP	
Twifu	Francis K. Buah	PNP	
Abura	Thomas K. Afful	ACP	
Ajumako	Nana Y. Impraim	ACP	
Cape Coast	K. Bassa Quansah	ACP	
Esikuma	Mrs. Constance Commey	ACP	
Komenda	Francis Ekow Eshun	ACP	
Mfantisman	Benjamin A. Yemoah	ACP	
Gomoa Assin	G. K. Benjah	ACP	
=== Eastern Region - 21 seats ===
Constituency	Elected MP	Elected Party	Majority
Akropong	Kwasi Akoto	PNP	
Asamankese	Adjei Alexander	PNP	
Densuagya	Mrs. Elizabeth Kusi-Aidoo	PNP	
Koforidua	Samuel Kwasi Amofa	PNP	
Krobo	Charles Kwesi Narh	PNP	
Manya	Rev. Gabriel Narh Kumasa	PNP	
Mid-Volta	Michael Paul Ansah	PNP	
Nsawam	Edwin T. Aboah	PNP	
Oda	S. B. Attafua	PNP	
Suhum	Ayisi E. A. Kwabena	PNP	
Yilo Osodoku	Emmanuel Kwadwo Obuadey	PNP	
Abetifi	Emmanuel Kwadwo Adu	PFP	
Afram	Benson Benjamin Ofori	PFP	
Begoro	Jones Ofori-Atta	PFP	
Birim	Afrifa Yaw Ahenkora	PFP	
Birim Anafo	S. K. A. Gyebi- Ofosu	PFP	
Nkwakwa	Kwaku Baah	PFP	
Abuakwa	Alexander K. Otchere	UNC	
Akwatia	Lionel Kofi Ablordepey	UNC	
Asiakwa	Asante Kwesi Yeboa	UNC	
Kade	A. B. Ankomah	UNC	
=== Greater Accra Region - 10 seats ===
Constituency	Elected MP	Elected Party	Majority
Kpeshie	Peter Ala Adjetey	UNC	
Osu Clottey	Harry Sawyerr	UNC	
Ada	Eunice Ametor-Williams	PNP	
Ayawaso	Alhaji Mohammed Farl	PNP	
Dangbe Shai	E. V. T. Engmann	PNP	
Ga	E. S. M. Commodore	PNP	
Okaikwei	J. Nee Amartey Hyde	PNP	
Tema	Seth Laryea Tetteh	PNP	
Ashiedu Keteke	S. A. Odoi Sykes	PFP	
Ablekuma	Adotey Nelson-Cofie	UNC	
=== Northern Region - 14 seats ===
Constituency	Elected MP	Elected Party	Majority
Bunkpurugu	John Laar Nurokina	PNP	
Gonja East	Francis Kwame Donkor	PNP	
Gonja Central	Seidu Zakaria	PNP	
Gonja West	Yakubu Saaka	PNP	
Nalerigu	Mahama Edmond Dramani	PNP	
Namumba	Adam Marshal Adu	PNP	
Walewale	John S. Nabila	PNP	
Chereponi	Samuel U. Dalafu	PFP	
Gushiegu	Abdulai Al-Hassan	PFP	
Tolon	Roland Issifu Alhassan	PFP	
Yendi	Shani Alhaji Mohammed	PFP	
Mion-Nanton	Oliver Sigli Mahamudu	SDF	
Savelugu	P. W. Iddrisu Ardani	SDF	
Tamale	Alhaji Abubakar Alhassan	SDF	
=== Upper Region -16 seats ===
Constituency	Elected MP	Elected Party	Majority
Bawku	Frank Abdulai Ayariga	PNP	
Bawku West	Mathias K. Atubiga	PNP	
Bolgatanga	Awulimbond Nicholas Adamboe	PNP	
Bongo	Asoko Asampambila	PNP	
Chiana Paga	Kubaje Andrea Amidila	PNP	
Jirapa-Lambussie	Dyyaka S. Bawa	PFP	
Lawra	Gandaa Naabomo	PNP	
Nadawli	J. I. Asaman	PNP	
Navrongo	Noble A. M. Bayeridzoa	PNP	
Sandema	Paul Oscar Anala	PNP	
Talensi	David Zanlerigu	PNP	
Tampane-Garu	Dominic A. Akudago	PNP	
Tumu	John Kofi Benin	PNP	
Wa	Abdul Moomin Alhaji	PNP	
Wa East	Sakara Adam Badoun	PNP	
Zebilla	Agbango G. Akeya	PNP	
=== Volta Region - 16 seats ===
Constituency	Elected MP	Elected Party	Majority
Dzodze	Peter Atsu Dzila	PNP	
Anlo	Hugh C. Tamakloe	UNC	
Akan	Kojo Obed Amoako-Prempeh	PNP	
Avenor	Joseph B. Yegbe	UNC	
Biakoye	Kwadzo Amoah	PNP	
Buem	Monica P. Atenkah	PNP	
Dayi East	Nelson Avega Agbesi	PNP	
Dayi West	Constance C. Fitih	PNP	
Ho East	Togbe Zokah III	PNP	
Ho West	Samuel Yao Dzebu	PNP	
Keta	Leo P. Torsu	UNC	
Krachi	Joseph Kofi Kapi	PNP	
Krachi Nkwanta	Kwame Benjamin Nyame	PNP	
Some-Aflao	Benjamin Kwabla Kpesese	UNC	
Tongu-North	Jonathan K. Dowokpor	PNP	
Tongu South	Godfried K. Agama	UNC	
=== Western Region - 13 seats ===
Constituency	Elected MP	Elected Party	Majority
Ahanta	John Bennett Grant	PNP	
Amenfi	Paul K. Damoah	PFP	
Aowin	W. K. Asamoah-Tannor	PNP	
Bibiani	A. O. F. Tawiah	PNP	
Jomoro	J. V. L. Mensah	PNP	
Nzema East	Isaac Chinebuah	PNP	
Sefwi-Wiawso	Isaac K. Fuakye	PNP	
Sekondi	Joseph E. Arbuah	ACP	
Shama	Ernest Nii Tachie-Otoo	ACP	
Takoradi	William N. Gram	ACP	
Tarkwa-Aboso	Kwamena Ocran	PNP	
Wassa-East	Anthony L. Ntsiako	PNP	
Wassa-West	Roland Atta-Kesson	PNP	

== By-elections ==
- Mampong North constituency - Akwasi Afrifa was executed on 26 June 1979, eight days after he was elected MP. In a by-election later, Ebenezer Augustus Kwasi Akuoko was elected to replace his vacant seat.

== See also ==
- 1979 Ghanaian parliamentary election
- Parliament of Ghana
- Jacob Hackenbug Griffiths-Randolph - Speaker of the Parliament of the 3rd Republic.
