= Akim Abuakwa North (Ghana parliament constituency) =

Constituency in the Eastern Region of Ghana

- constituency for the Parliament of Ghana
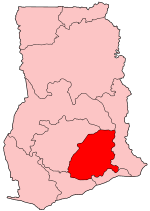
- District: East Akim Municipal District
- Region: Eastern Region of Ghana

Current constituency
- Created: 2004
- Party: New Patriotic Party
- MP: Nana Ampaw Kwame Addo-Frempong

Akim Abuakwa North is one of the constituencies represented in the Parliament of Ghana. It was created out of the Abuakwa constituency in 2004. As a constituency,it elects one member of parliament who represents the constituents at parliament. The constituency is located in the Abuakwa North Municipal District of the Eastern Region of Ghana. Its administrative capital is Kibi.

== Members of Parliament ==
First elected	Member	Party
Abuakwa constituency
1956	C. E. Nimo	Convention People's Party
1969	Gibson Dokyi Ampaw	Progress Party
1979	Alexander K. Otchere	United National Convention
1992	Owuraku Amofah	Every Ghanaian Living Everywhere
1996	Nana Akufo-Addo	New Patriotic Party
Akim Abuakwa North constituency
2004	J. B. Danquah-Adu	New Patriotic Party
2008	Samuel Kwadwo Amoako	New Patriotic Party
2012	J. B. Danquah-Adu	New Patriotic Party
2016	Gifty Twum Ampofo	New Patriotic Party
2024	Nana Ampaw Kwame Addo-Frempong	New Patriotic Party

Samuel Kwadwo Amoako was the member of parliament for the constituency between January 2009 and January 2013. He was elected on the ticket of the New Patriotic Party (NPP)and won a majority of 5,046 votes to become the MP. He succeeded J. B. Danquah-Adu who had won the seat in December 2004 with the NPP. J. B. Danquah-Adu won the seat back in the 2016 Ghanaian general election. J. B. Danquah-Adu was murdered on 9 February 2016 at his home. Gifty Twum Ampofo then succeeded J. B. Danquah-Adu and became the member of Parliament of the constituency now (2023) and served in the 6th and 7th and parliament of Ghana on the ticket of the NPP.

Nana Ampaw Kwame Addo-Frempong succeeded Gifty Twum-Ampofo after winning the 2024 Ghanaian general election to become the member of parliament for the 9th parliament of the fourth republic representing the New Patriotic Party.

== Capital ==
The capital of Akim Abuakwa North is Kukurantumi. The population in the 2021 census was 91,297.

== See also ==
- List of Ghana Parliament constituencies
