= All People's Party (Ghana) =

- Leader: Victor Owusu
- Chairperson: John Bilson
- General Secretary: Obed Asamoah
- Deputy: Mahama Iddrisu
- Vice Chairperson: Nii Armaa Amarteifio; J. H. Mensah
- Founded: 1981
- Banned: 31 December 1981
- Merger of: Popular Front Party and United National Convention

The All People's Party was a former political party in Ghana. It was formed by the merger between the Popular Front Party (PFP) led by Victor Owusu, the United National Convention (UNC) led by William Ofori Atta and other parties in June 1981. It became the main opposition party in Ghana during the Third Republic until the military coup d'état on 31 December 1981 after which all political parties were banned by the Provisional National Defence Council. The ruling party at the time was the People's National Party under President Hilla Limann.

Five opposition parties initially set out to form the APP. These are the PFP, UNC, the Action Congress Party (ACP), the Social Democratic Front (SDF) and the Third Force Party (TFP). The new party elected Victor Owusu of the PFP as its leader and Mahama Iddrisu of the UNC as deputy leader. Obed Asamoah, also of the UNC became the General Secretary with Obeng Manu as his deputy. John Bilson, leader of the TFP was elected as the chairman while Nii Amaa Amarteifio and J. H. Mensah of the PFP were appointed as deputy chairpersons. The ACP however withdrew from the merger before it was finalised.

== See also ==
- List of political parties in Ghana
