= Subin (Ghana parliament constituency) =

Constituency in the Ashanti Region of Ghana

- constituency for the Parliament of Ghana
- District: Kumasi Metropolitan Assembly
- Region: Ashanti Region of Ghana

Current constituency
- Party: New Patriotic Party
- MP: Kofi Obiri Yeboah

Subin is one of the constituencies represented in the Parliament of Ghana. It elects one Member of Parliament (MP) by the first past the post system of election

Kofi Obiri Yeboah is the member of parliament for the constituency. He was elected on the ticket of the New Patriotic Party (NPP) to become the MP. He succeeded Eugene Boakye Antwi who had represented the constituency also on the ticket of the NPP.

== Members of Parliament ==
First elected	Member	Party
First Republic
1965	Mohammed Babaley Sulemana	Convention People's Party
Second Republic
1969	Thomas Kwame Aboagye	Progress Party
Third Republic
1979	Thomas Kwame Aboagye	Popular Front Party
Fourth Republic
1992	Joseph Alexander Tuffour Sarkodie	National Democratic Congress
1996	Sampson Kwaku Boafo	New Patriotic Party
2008	Isaac Osei	New Patriotic Party
2016	Eugene Boakye Antwi	New Patriotic Party

== Elections ==
2020 Ghanaian general election: Subin:
Party	Candidate	Votes	%	±%
New Patriotic Party	Eugene Boakye Antwi	41,238	72.5	+—
National Democratic Congress	Abubakar Mohammed Murtala	15,610	27.5	+—
Majority		25,628	45.0	+—
Turnout				
Registered electors		73,147		

== See also ==
- List of Ghana Parliament constituencies
