= Kwasi Annoh Ankama =

Ghanaian lawyer and politician

Kwasi Annoh Ankamah MP

MP for Atiwa
- In office January 2009 – 1 July 2010
- President: John Evans Atta Mills
- Succeeded by: Kwesi Amoako Atta

Personal details
- Born: 1 June 1957 Ghana
- Died: 1 July 2010 (aged 53) London
- Party: New Patriotic Party
- Children: 3
- Education: University of Ghana, Ghana School of Law
- Occupation: Politician
- Profession: Lawyer

Kwasi Annoh Ankamah (1 June 1957 – 1 July 2010) was a Ghanaian lawyer and politician. He was a Member of Parliament of the Atiwa constituency and a member of the New Patriotic Party. He died while in office on an official delegation to London. He was succeeded as MP by Kwesi Amoako Atta.

== Early life and education ==
Kwasi Ankamah was born at Abomosu in the Eastern Region of Ghana. He obtained a Bachelor of Arts degree in Law and Political Science from the University of Ghana, Legon, in 1984. He then proceeded to the Ghana School of Law, Makola, graduating in 1986. He obtained a post-graduate diploma in Housing Law from the University of London in 1997.

== Career and political life ==
Annoh Ankamah worked as a lawyer and was a Special Assistant to President John Agyekum Kufour.

In 2008, he contested and won the Atiwa constituency election by obtaining 26,423 votes out of the 34,570 valid votes cast, representing 76.4 percent of the vote. Annoh Ankamah served on various parliamentary committees, including the Subsidiary Legislation Committee, Judiciary Committee, and Local Government and Rural Development Committee of Parliament.

His parliamentary seat was declared vacant on 7 July 2010 by Joyce Bamford-Addo, the then Speaker of Parliament. A by-election held to fill the vacant seat was won by Kwesi Amoako Atta.

== Personal life ==
Annoh Ankamah was married with three children. He was a Christian and a member of the Catholic Church in Ghana.

== Death ==
In June 2010, Annoh Ankamah was part of an official government delegation that traveled to the United Kingdom for political consultations. He fell ill during the trip and was taken to a hospital in London, but died while receiving treatment on July 1. His body was returned to Ghana for burial on August 20, and interred later that month.
