= Kwaku Danso-Boafo =

Ghanaian academic, diplomat and politician (born 1949)

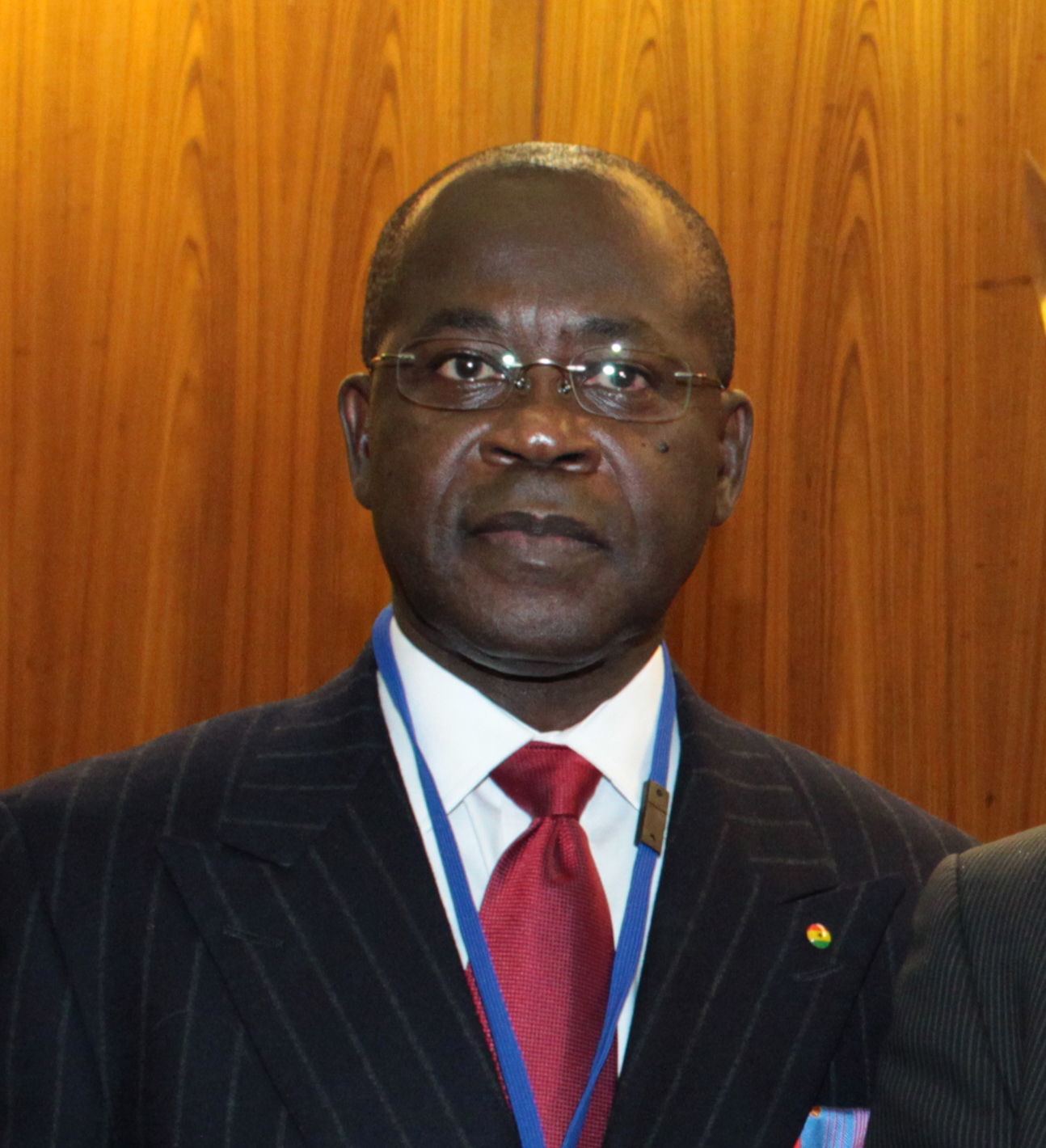

Ghana's High Commissioner to the United Kingdom and Ireland
- In office September 2009 – January 2014
- Preceded by: Samuel Nuamah Donkor
- Succeeded by: Richard Winfred Anane

Minister for Health
- In office January 2000 – February 2001
- Preceded by: Isaac Osei
- Succeeded by: Victor Emmanuel Smith

Ghana's Ambassador to Cuba, Jamaica, Trinidad and Tobago, Nicaragua and Panama
- In office 1997 – January 2000

Personal details
- Born: Alex Kwaku Danso-Boafo; 23 November 1949 (age 76) Abomosu, Atiwa District, Akyem Abuakwa
- Spouse: Dorothy Danso-Boafo
- Education: Ofori Panin Secondary School
- Alma mater: Winneba College of Education; Suffolk University; Howard University

Alex Kwaku Danso-Boafo (born 23 November 1949) is a Ghanaian academic, diplomat and politician and He currently serves as Cabinet Secretary of the Republic of Ghana. He is a member of the National Democratic Congress. Between 1997 and January 2000, he served as Ghana's Ambassador to Cuba with concurrent accreditation to Jamaica, Trinidad and Tobago, Nicaragua and Panama. He also served as the Minister of Health from January 2000 to February 2001 and Ghana's High Commissioner to the United Kingdom and Ireland from 2009 to 2014.

== Early life and education ==
Danso-Boafo was born on 23 November 1949 at Abomosu, a town in the Atiwa West District, Eastern Region of Ghana. He had his secondary school education at Ofori Panin Secondary School in New Tafo and at Winneba College of Education. He attended Suffolk University, Boston, Massachusetts, where he obtained a Bachelor of Science degree in 1976. He proceeded to the Northeastern University, completing a Master of Public Administration degree (MPA) in 1977. He also received a Doctor of Philosophy degree (PhD) from Howard University, Washington, D.C. in 1981. His doctoral thesis was titled ''The Political Biography of Dr. Kofi Abrefa Busia'', a Ghanaian politician who was the second Prime Minister of Ghana.

== Academic career ==
=== University of Ghana ===
Danso-Boafo started his academic career in 1982 as a lecturer in the University of Ghana, Legon, where he taught at the Department of Political Science and later the School of Administration now University of Ghana Business School.

From 1982 to 1985, he played several roles in the university, including serving as the General Secretary of the University Teachers Association of Ghana (UTAG), Legon Chapter, and as a member of the national UTAG executive committee. Within that same period, he was a fellow of Akuafo Hall and a member of the University Admissions Committee. Danso-Boafo also took on other teaching assignments including serving as a visiting lecturer at the Rural Development College which is now the Institute of Local Government Studies at Madina and Ghana Armed Forces Staff College at Teshie.

=== Clark Atlanta University ===
Danso-Boafo moved to the United States to teach at the Atlanta University, later Clark Atlanta University in Atlanta, Georgia from 1986 to 1997 and from 2001 to 2005. At the university, Danso-Boafo assumed several roles, most notably serving as the Head of Department of Public Administration from 1989 to 1990 and Head of the Post-Graduate Program in International Affairs and Development from 1991 to 1997 and for a second tenure from 2002 to 2005.

In 1994, Danso-Boafo attained the academic rank of Associate Professor.

== Diplomatic and political career ==
=== Ambassador ===
Danso-Boafo is a member of the National Democratic Congress (NDC). In 1997, he took a break from lecturing to serve as Ghana's Ambassador to Cuba with concurrent and multiple accreditation to Trinidad and Tobago, Jamaica, Nicaragua and Panama.

In January 2009, after his party won the 2008 elections, Danso-Boafo was given a role to serve as a member of John Atta Mills' transition team, working under the International Relations sub-committee. He was later appointed by John Evans Atta Mills to serve as Ghana's High Commissioner to the United Kingdom and Ireland. He served in that role until 2014 when he was succeeded by Victor Emmanuel Smith.

=== Politics ===
In January 2000, Danso-Boafo was appointed by President Jerry Rawlings to serve as Minister for Health taking over from Samuel Nuamah Donkor. In his role as the Minister of Health, Danso-Boafo attended several international forums and health summits, such as the 2000 World Health Assembly in Geneva, Switzerland, on which occasion he was elected to chair the World Health Organization (WHO) discourse on health systems. Others included the Roll Back Malaria Summit in Abuja, Nigeria in April 2000, the Global Symposium on Health and Welfare Systems Development in the 21st Century in Kobe, Japan in November 2000, where he presented a paper titled "A case study of Health and Welfare Reform in Ghana". He also participated in the summit meeting on HIV/AIDS in Abuja, Nigeria, in April 2001 and the United Nations Conference on Trade and Development (UNCTAD) summit on Least Developed Countries (LDC) in Brussels, Belgium, in May 2001.

At the party level, he was assigned to the NDC's Manifesto Drafting and Constitutional committees in 2000. His party however lost power in the December 2000 elections which meant the end of his ministerial work in January 2001 when the new government assumed office.

In October 2019, Danso-Boafo was appointed as the chairman of the NDC's 2020 Manifesto Committee with several notable people serving as members of the committee including Haruna Iddrisu, Ekwow Spio-Garbrah, Jane Naana Opoku-Agyemang and Nana Oye Lithur.

In January 2025, Prof Kwaku Danso-Boafo was appointed by President John Drama Mahama as Cabinet Secretary

== Personal life ==
Kwaku Danso-Boafo married his first wife Carol, in 1980 and had a son, Kwabena. He later married Judith Koranteng in 1989. They have two children, Kwadjo Sintim Misa born in November 1989, and Adjoa Difie born in January 1992. He also has a son born in December 1994 with Rosalind Arthur. He later re-married Dorothy Owusu-Ankoma, wife number two. He was the president of the Association of Ghanaians in Atlanta from 1992 and 1994. He is an advisory council member of the Walter Rodney Foundation.

=== Professional association ===
Danso-Boafo is a member of the American Society for Public Administration, American Public Health Association, Academy of Political Science, African Studies Association, Association of Third World Studies and International Development Association.

== Honours ==
On 20 September 2012, Danso-Boafo was honoured at the launch of the Ghana UK-Based Achievement (GUBA) Awards 2012 for his service to the Ghanaian community in the United Kingdom and for his years of service and support to the awards scheme. On 11 December 2013, he was honoured as a fellow of the Ghana College of Physicians and Surgeons for his contribution to medical education and research at the postgraduate level.

== Published works ==
Danso-Boafo has worked on research works within the political science, history, governance and health care.

- The Political Biography of Dr. Kofi Abrefa Busia, doctoral thesis, Howard University, 1981 (331 pages)
- The Political Biography of Dr. Kofi Abrefa Busia, Ghana Universities Press, 1996 (179)
- J. J. Rawlings and the Democratic Transition in Ghana, 2014

Political offices
Preceded by Kofi Awoonor	Ghana's Ambassador to Cuba, Jamaica, Trinidad and Tobago, Nicaragua and Panama; 1997–2000	Succeeded by Isaac Antwi Omane
Preceded by Samuel Nuamah Donkor	Minister for Health; 2000–2001	Succeeded by Richard Winfred Anane
Preceded by Isaac Osei	Ghana's High Commissioner to the United Kingdom and Ireland; 2009–2014	Succeeded by Victor Emmanuel Smith
