= J. B. Danquah-Adu =

Ghanaian politician (1965–2016)

Joseph Boakye Danquah

MP for Akim Abuakwa North
- In office 7 January 2013 – 9 February 2016
- President: John Mahama
- Preceded by: Samuel Kwadwo Amoako
- Succeeded by: Gifty Twum Ampofo

MP for Akim Abuakwa North
- In office 7 January 2005 – 6 January 2009
- President: John Agyekum Kufour
- Preceded by: Nana Akufo-Addo
- Succeeded by: Samuel Kwadwo Amoako

Personal details
- Born: 2 July 1965 Old Tafo, Eastern Region
- Died: 9 February 2016 (aged 50)
- Party: New Patriotic Party
- Children: 2
- Occupation: Politician
- Profession: Chartered Accountants

Joseph Boakye Danquah Adu (2 July 1965 – 9 February 2016), was a Ghanaian chartered accountant and politician. He was a member of the Parliament of Ghana for the New Patriotic Party between 2005 and 2009, and once more from 2013 until his death.

== Early life ==
JB Danquah Adu was born on 2 July 1965 at Old Tafo in the Eastern Region of Ghana. His grandfather, J. B. Danquah after whom he was named, played a role in Ghana's struggles for independence, a member of a group of politicians nicknamed the Big Six, and later an opponent of Kwame Nkrumah, Ghana's first prime minister and president. The name Danquah is sometimes spelt as Dankwa. His secondary school education was at the Presbyterian Boys' Senior High School at Legon.

== Personal life ==
He was married and had two children.

== Life in politics ==
He joined Ghana's parliament when he won a seat in the Ghana's general elections in 2004 to represent Abuakwa North. He was appointed as Deputy Minister for Women and Children's Affairs by the John Agyekum Kufuor administration. He lost the seat to, Samuel Kwadwo Amoako, a member of his own party, the New Patriotic Party in the 2008 general elections. He however won it back in the 2012 general elections by beating the National Democratic Congress's Victor Smith. He was a member of both the Special Budgets Committee and the Trade, Industry and Tourism Committee in Ghana's 5th parliament of the 4th Republic.

== Death ==
On 9 February 2016, he was stabbed dead in the early hours of the morning. Subsequently, the police arrested a man for the murder. The man, Daniel Asiedu, later confessed to killing the MP, in a struggle as he tried to rob him, and was charged with murder.
