= Danso (name) =

Danso is a surname. Notable people with the surname include:

Surname:

- Kwaku Danso-Boafo (born 1949), Ghanaian diplomat
- Benjamin Danso (born 1984), German rugby union player
- Erixon Danso (born 1989), Ghanaian-Dutch footballer
- Kevin Danso (born 1998), Austrian footballer
- Mamadou Danso (born 1983), Gambian footballer
- Megan Danso (born 1990), Canadian actress
- Mustapha Danso (born 1981), Gambian constable, soldier
- Richard Danso (born 2000), Ghanaian footballer
