= Laurette Korkor Asante =

Ghanaian politician

Hon. MP Korkor Laurette Asante

Member of the Ghana Parliament for Atiwa West
- Incumbent
- Assumed office January 7, 2025
- Preceded by: Kwasi Amoako Atta

Personal details
- Born: November 12, 1962 (age 63) Kwabeng Ghana
- Party: New Patriotic Party
- Education: Barnard College; Rutgers Law School
- Occupation: Politician, Lawyer

Laurette Korkor Asante (born November 12, 1962) is a Ghanaian politician, lawyer and member of the New Patriotic Party (NPP). She is the member of Parliament for the Atiwa West constituency in the Eastern Region (Ghana). She represents the constituency in the Ninth Parliament of the Fourth Republic of Ghana as a member of the New Patriotic Party.

== Early life and education ==
Laurette hails from Kwabeng in the Eastern Region (Ghana) of Ghana. She obtained her Bachelors of Arts degree in economics from the Barnard College,Columbia University 1986. She later earned a Juris Doctor from the Rutgers Law School in 1994.

== Career ==
Laurette before her parliamentary victory served as the deputy-director in charge of operations and benefits at Social Security and National Insurance Trust. She also worked as a non-executive director at Societe Generale Ghana.

== Political life ==
In January 2024, she contested and won the NPP parliamentary primaries for Atiwa West (Ghana parliament constituency) in the Eastern Region of Ghana. She subsequently won the parliamentary seat during the 2024 Ghanaian general election with 16,395 representing 67.04% of total votes to become part of the ninth parliament of the fourth Republic of Ghana.<reff name="norvanreports_2024-12-17"/>
