= Nana Ampaw Kwame Addo-Frempong =

Ghanaian politician and lawyer

Hon. Nana Ampaw Kwame Addo Frempong

Member of Parliament for Akim Abuakwa North (Ghana parliament constituency)
- Incumbent
- Assumed office 07 January 2025 - Present
- Preceded by: Gifty Twum-Ampofo

Personal details
- Born: November 5, 1983 (age 42) Kukurantumi, Ghana
- Party: New Patriotic Party
- Spouse: Nana Afoa Addo-Frempong
- Children: 2
- Education: Presbyterian Boys' Senior High School; Technical University of Munich; University of Ghana
- Occupation: Politician, Researcher
- Nickname: Chief Buffalo

Nana Ampaw Kwame Addo-Frempong (born 5 November 1983) is a Ghanaian politician and researcher. He is currently the member of parliament for the Akim Abuakwa North (Ghana parliament constituency) in the 9th parliament of the fourth republic. He previously served as a board member of the Ghana National Buffer Stock Company during the Nana Akufo-Addo administration.He is married to Nana Afoa Addo-Frempong with two children.

== Early life and education ==
Nana Ampaw was born in Kukurantumi in the Eastern Region of Ghana.He had his Senior High Education at the Presbyterian Boys' Senior High School and continued to the University of Ghana where he obtained a Bachelors of Arts in Geography and Resource Development with Information Studies. In 20218, he graduated with an MSC in Sustainable Resource Management from the Technical University of Munich and subsequently pursuing his PhD degree.

== Personal life ==
He is married to Nana Afoa Addo-Frempong With two children

== Politics ==
In January 2024, he contested and won the NPP parliamentary primaries for Akim Abuakwa North (Ghana parliament constituency) in the Eastern Region of Ghana.

He subsequently won this parliamentary seat during the 2024 Ghanaian general elections.
