= Osei Asibey =

Ghanaian politician and medical doctor

Member of Parliament
- Constituency: Asukwa

Personal details
- Party: Popular Front Party
- Occupation: Politician, medical doctor
- Known for: Member of Parliament for Asukwa Constituency

Osei Asibey was a Ghanaian politician and medical doctor. He was the Member of Parliament in the 1979 Ghanaian parliament for the Asukwa Constituency in the Ashanti region of Ghana.

== Politics ==
Asibey was a member of the Popular Front Party and was elected in the 1979 Ghanaian general election to represent the people of Asukwa in the 1st Parliament of the 3rd Republic of Ghana.
