= Asamang Tamfoe =

Community in Eastern Region, Ghana

- Town
- Country: Ghana
- Region: Eastern Region
- District: Atewa East District

Population
  - Total: —
- Time zone: GMT
  - Summer (DST): GMT

Asamang Tamfoe is a mining and farming community near Anyinam in the Atewa East District in the Eastern Region of Ghana. The community is located in the Akyem Abuakwa Traditional Area. The Chief of Asamang Tamfoe is Osaberima Kwame Kuoh II. The Birim River and the Kobeng River runs through the community.
