= Kengen (disambiguation) =

Kengen may refer to:

- E. T. Kengen, Colonel in the Royal Netherlands Army during World War II and a senior member of the short lived American-British-Dutch-Australian Command. In 1945 he was Commander of the Royal Netherlands East Indies Army Air Force
- Kengen, Ghana, originally called Kenrene is a town in Jomoro District of Nzima West Constituency of the Western Region of Ghana
- Kengen, a Japanese era name, spanning the years from 1302 through 1303, it comes after Shōan and before Kagen.
- Kenya Electricity Generating Company, that is usually shortened to "KenGen". It is the largest power producing company in Kenya producing about 80% of the electricity consumed in the country.
