= 1979 Ghanaian general election =

- Presidential election
← 1960	18 June 1979 (first round); 9 July 1979 (second round)	1992 →
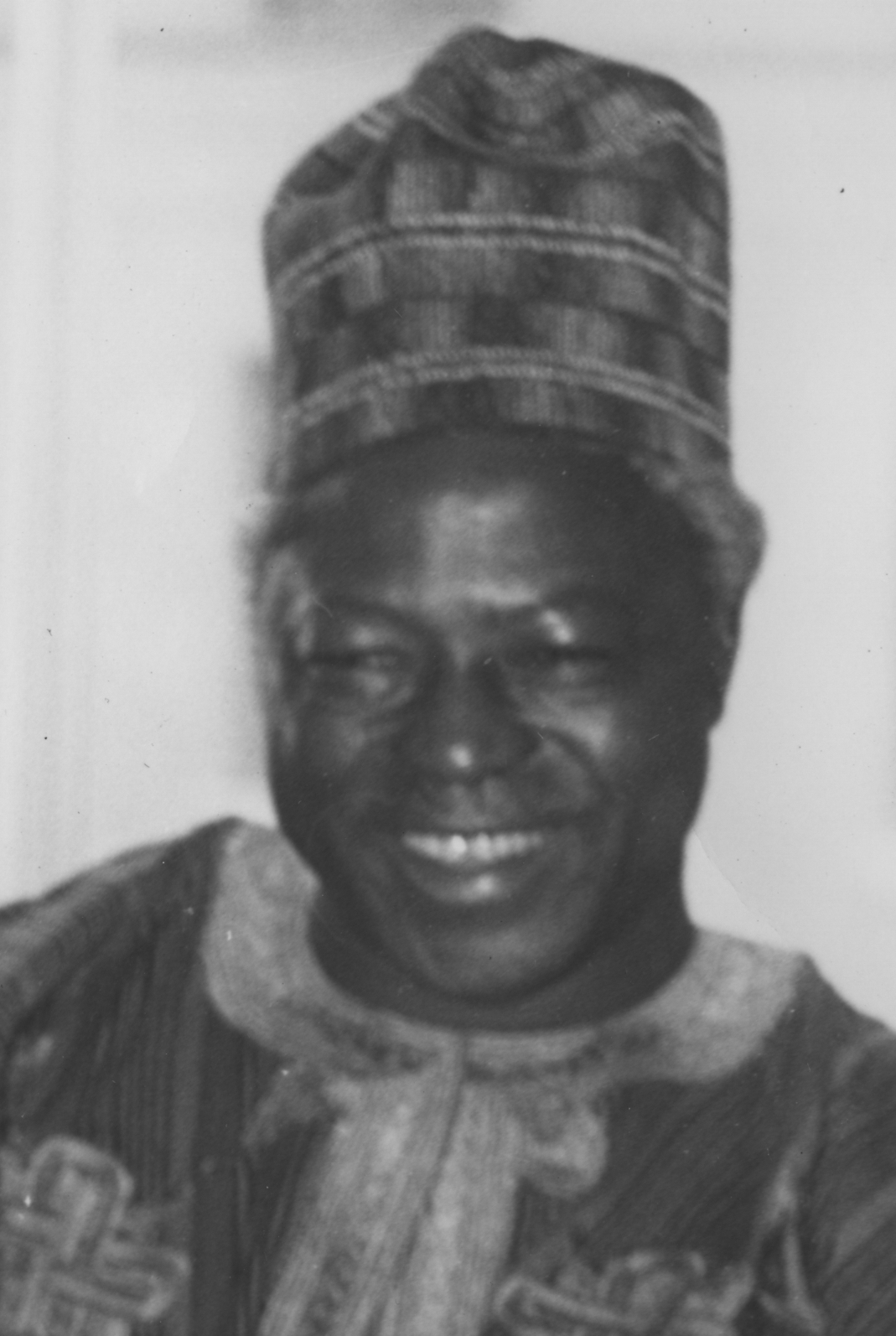

Nominee	Hilla Limann	Victor Owusu
Party	PNP	PFP
Popular vote	1,118,305	686,097
Percentage	61.98%	38.02%
- Results by region
President before election
Jerry John Rawlings
Military
President-elect
Hilla Limann
PNP
- Parliamentary election
← 1969	18 June 1979	1992 →
- All 140 seats in Parliament; 71 seats needed for a majority
Party	Vote %	Seats
People's National Party	36.44	71
Popular Front Party	30.60	42
United National Convention	17.51	13
Action Congress Party	8.84	10
Social Democratic Front	3.90	3
Independents	0.91	1
This lists parties that won seats. See the complete results below.

General elections were held in Ghana on 18 June 1979, with a second round of the presidential election on 9 July 1979. The presidential election resulted in victory for Hilla Limann of the People's National Party, who received 62% of the vote in the run-off, whilst his PNP won 71 of the 140 seats in Parliament. According to one scholar, the elections were conducted "in as free and fair a manner as might be considered humanly possible under local conditions" and the losing candidates publicly accepted defeat. Around 5,070,000 people were registered to vote.

The Electoral Commissioner during the elections was Joseph Kingsley-Nyinah, an Appeal Court Judge who was appointed by the Supreme Military Council (SMC). Although the SMC was overthrown on 4 June 1979, the Armed Forces Revolutionary Council military government which replaced it allowed the elections to proceed just two weeks later.

== Results ==
=== President ===
Candidate	Party	First round		Second round	
Candidate	Party	Votes	%	Votes	%
Hilla Limann	People's National Party	631,559	35.32	1,118,305	61.98
Victor Owusu	Popular Front Party	533,928	29.86	686,097	38.02
William Ofori Atta	United National Convention	311,265	17.41		
Frank Bernasko	Action Congress Party	167,775	9.38		
Ibrahim Mahama	Social Democratic Front	66,445	3.72		
John Bilson	Third Force Party	49,104	2.75		
R. P. Baffour	Independent	8,812	0.49		
Kwame Nyanteh	Independent	8,490	0.47		
Mark Diamond Addy	Independent	5,957	0.33		
Imoru Ayarna	Independent	4,874	0.27		
Total		1,788,209	100.00	1,804,402	100.00
Registered voters/turnout		5,070,000	–		
Source: Nohlen et al.

=== Parliament ===
Party	Votes	%	Seats
People's National Party	645,080	36.44	71
Popular Front Party	541,659	30.60	42
United National Convention	310,062	17.51	13
Action Congress Party	156,484	8.84	10
Social Democratic Front	69,052	3.90	3
Third Force Party	31,887	1.80	0
Independents	16,165	0.91	1
Total	1,770,389	100.00	140
Source: African Elections Database

==== Seats won by region ====
Party	Central	Accra	Eastern	Ashanti	Brong-Ahafo	Volta	North	Upper	Western	Total
People's National Party	8	6	11	2	2	11	7	15	9	71
Popular Front Party	0	1	6	19	10	0	4	1	1	42
United National Convention	0	3	4	1	0	5	0	0	0	13
Action Congress Party	7	0	0	0	0	0	0	0	3	10
Social Democratic Front	0	0	0	0	0	0	3	0	0	3
Independents	0	0	0	0	1	0	0	0	0	1
Total	15	10	21	22	13	16	14	16	13	140
Source: Jeffries

== See also ==
- List of MPs elected in the 1979 Ghanaian parliamentary election
