= Kwasi Amoako Atta =

Ghanaian politician

Kwesi Amoako Atta MP
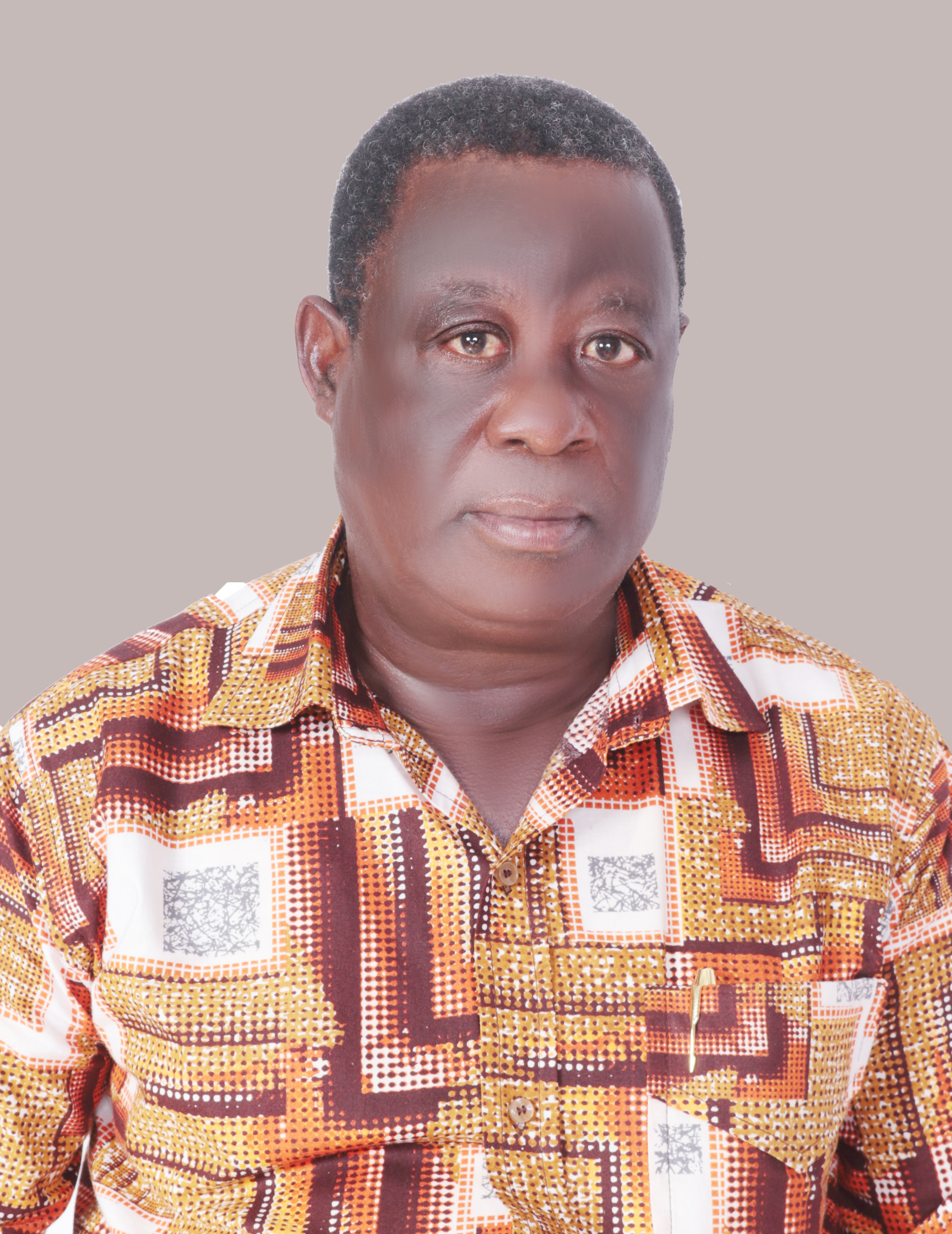

MP for Atiwa West
- Incumbent
- Assumed office 19 October 2010
- President: J. A. Mills, John D. Mahama, Nana Akuffo-Addo
- Preceded by: Kwasi Annoh Ankama

Minister for Ministry of Roads and Highways
- In office February 2017 – 14 February 2024
- President: Nana Akuffo-Addo

Personal details
- Born: 5 August 1951 (age 75) Ghana
- Party: New Patriotic Party
- Children: 4
- Education: University of Ghana, Ghana School of Law
- Occupation: Politician
- Profession: Lawyer

Kwasi Amoako-Attah (born 5 August 1951) is a Ghanaian lawyer, management consultant and politician. He is the Member of Parliament of the Atiwa West constituency in the Eastern Region of Ghana. He is a member of the New Patriotic Party and, as of 2017. He is a former Ghana's Minister for Roads and Highways.

== Early life and education ==
Kwesi Amoako Atta was born on 5 August 1951 at Akyem-Awenare in the Eastern Region of Ghana. He attended Abuakwa State College where he received his GCE Ordinary Level certificate and continued to Tarkwa Senior High School for his GCE Advanced Level certificate. He obtained a Bachelor of Science degree in Administration from the University of Ghana, Legon. He then proceeded to the Ghana School of Law, Makola and was called to the Ghana Bar in 2002. He obtained an Executive Master of Business Administration from the University of Ghana.

== Working life ==
After graduation from the University of Ghana, Atta was employed from 1979 to 1985 at the now defunct Meat Marketing Board as a regional manager. He then joined Unilever Ghana, where he was first made the brands manager then head of logistics and marketing. When he was called to the Ghana Bar, he joined the legal department, where he rose to Group Legal Advisor of Vlisco Ghana Group. He left the company in 2010 to pursue a career in politics.

== Political life ==
Atta entered the Ghanaian political scene in 2010 when he contested the Atiwa West seat. Three other candidates, namely Emmanuel Atta Twum of the National Democratic Congress, George Padmore Apreku of the New Vision Party, and Kasum Abdul-Karim of the People's National Convention also contested in the 2010 by-election of Atiwa held on 31 August 2010. Atta won the election by obtaining 20,282 votes out of 27,540 cast, representing 75.0 percent of total valid votes.

He was sworn into the Parliament of Ghana on 19 October 2010 by Joyce Bamford-Addo. He went on to win the two subsequent Atiwa constituency elections in the 2012 parliamentary elections and in the 2016 parliamentary elections.

== Minister of Roads and Highways ==
In January 2017, President Nana Akuffo-Addo nominated Atta for the position of Minister of Roads and Highways in Ghana. Atta was tasked with improving urban and feeder roads in the country, especially those in Ghana's agricultural belt. This would improve the country's food security.

=== Parliamentary vetting ===
The Appointments Committee of Parliament met Atta on 2 February 2017 and vetted him on his vision for the ministry. He told the committee of his vision to automate all toll booths in the country. He articulated that prior to the automation process, he would personally oversee the recruitment of persons with disabilities as toll collectors at the various toll booths across the country. This policy would ensure that 50 percent of all toll collectors would be persons with disabilities. According to Atta, this would reduce the economic burden of the country towards the upkeep of people living with disabilities.

Akuffo-Addo swore in all the ministers who had been approved by Parliament on 10 February 2017. Atta was among ten other ministers who received their ministerial charters to begin work in their various ministries.

=== Ministerial activities ===
In July 2017 he launched the Persons with Disability Road Toll Initiative. The first group of 80 persons with disabilities completed the training program and were duly allocated toll booths to work in. Atta reiterated the fact that a total of 200 persons with disabilities would be employed under the initiative. He is currently the Minister for Roads and Highways.

== Personal life ==
Atta is married with four children. He is a member of the Presbyterian Church of Ghana.

Political offices
Preceded by ?	Minister of Roads and Highways; Ghana; 2017–	Incumbent
