= James Van Leuven Mensah =

Ghanaian politician, accountant and banker

Hon. James Van Leuven Mensah (J.V.L Mensah)
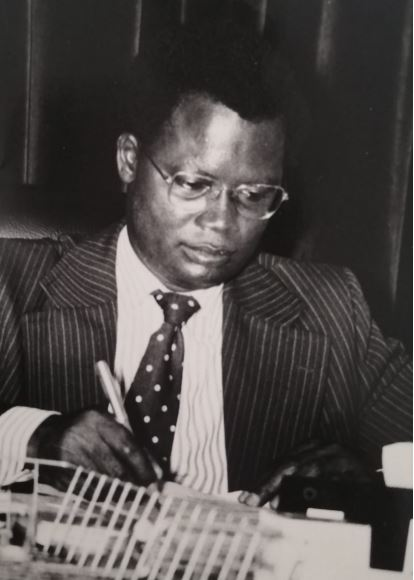

Member of Parliament for Jomoro Constituency 1979-81
- President: Hilla Limann
- Preceded by: Hon Amenlema
- Succeeded by: Joseph Emmanuel Ackah

Personal details
- Born: 8 February 1937 Kengen, Ghana
- Died: 29 October 2021 (aged 84) Kengen, Ghana
- Party: People's National Party
- Education: Penn State Law, University of Buckingham, Achimota School
- Occupation: Public Servant / Banker / Politician
- Profession: Accountant

James Van Leuven Mensah (also known as J.V.L. Mensah) was a Ghanaian accountant, public servant, banker, and politician.

== Early life and education ==
He was born at Kengen, Ghana to Joseph Mensah and Yanke Adela on 8 February 1937. After settling at Kengen, Joseph named his son after a Dutch missionary he worked with, Fr. Van Leuven, at the local Saint Mary's Catholic Church.

Mensah attended the local school and sat the Common Entrance Examination at Axim. Following an interview at Cape Coast, he was admitted to Achimota School. He completed Cambridge Overseas School Certificate GCE Ordinary Level equivalent in 1955. He went to the College of Technology, Kumasi in 1956. In 1962, he attended the School of Administration, Achimota, where he studied ACCA intermediate Accountancy. In 1965, he went to England to complete his ACCA Final in Accountancy at Balham and Tooting College of Commerce and became a member of the ACCA that year. He became a Fellow (FCCA) in 1973.

In 1983, while in the UK he enrolled on an inter LLB course at Charts University College London. He later transferred to University of Buckingham where he was awarded an honours degree in 1985. He went to the US to start a Masters in law at Penn State Law in 1986.

== Career and public life ==
Mensah worked with the United Africa Company (UAC) from 1957 to 1965 as a management trainee and trainee accountant before travelling to the UK. While there, he also worked for the United Africa Company. When he returned to Ghana after his studies, he started with the Bank of Ghana as an internal auditor. He later became the Chief Internal Auditor and Bank Examiner. In May 1975, Mensah took up the position of Managing Director of the then-Ghana Supply Commission (now Ghana Supply Company Limited). As the Managing Director, he represented the Commission both in the country and abroad and dealt with administrative and legal matters on behalf of the commission. He tried to collect debt owed to the Commission and the Government of Ghana from Trefalcon a company that had been dealing with the commission and had defaulted in payments. While working for the Ghana Supply Commission, he protected the best interests of the Government of Ghana against outside businesses through legal proceedings and by so doing set legal precedents widely used in commercial law, textbooks and law studies.

== Political life ==
Mensah had a brief political career. In 1979, he was elected to the seat for Jomoro (Ghana parliament constituency) (Nzema West) and became the Member of Parliament for that area under the People's National Party led by Hilla Limann. As a Member of Parliament, it was reported that he advised the youth of the Jomoro area to refrain from chieftaincy affairs at a fundraising ceremony organised by the youth at Tikobo Number 2 in January 1981 but rather direct their efforts towards the development of the area. His input was curtailed by the coup of 31 December 1981 which brought Jerry Rawlings and the Provisional National Defence Council to power in Ghana.

== Rural banking work ==
On his return to Ghana after a period of absence, living in England, USA, and Ivory Coast, he worked with his local Jomoro Rural Bank Tikobo 1 which he was instrumental in setting up in 1981, as Chairman of the Board of Directors. Addressing the 12th Annual General Meeting of shareholders in 2008, he reported that he ran the bank satisfactorily despite stiff competition and loss of customers to traditional and foreign banks in the area. He increased net profit by 47.90 per cent from GH¢14,000 in the previous year to GH¢ 27,630 during the year under review. Investments of the bank rose from GH¢744,149 in 2006 to GH¢808,242 in 2007 and advanced loans to GH¢652,292 from GH¢512,872 in the previous year, an increase of 21.27 per cent. He tackled bank fraud leading to the prosecution at Sekondi High Court of three syndicate members who swindled the bank in April 2007.

== Personal life ==
He died at his home in Kengen on 29 October 2021 aged 84.
