= Yaw Brempong-Yeboah =

Ghanaian politician (1954–2026)

Dr. Yaw Brempong-Yeboah

MP for Atiwa West
- In office 7 January 2001 – 6 January 2009
- President: John Agyekum Kufour

Personal details
- Born: 5 May 1954 Atiwa West, Eastern Region Region, Gold Coast (now Ghana)
- Died: 30 January 2026 (aged 71)
- Party: New Patriotic Party
- Education: University of Ghana
- Occupation: Politician
- Profession: Entomologist

Yaw Brempong-Yeboah (5 May 1954 – 30 January 2026) was a Ghanaian politician who was a member of the fourth parliament of the fourth Republic of Ghana representing the Atiwa West constituency in the Eastern Region of Ghana. He served as a Senior Lecturer in Entomology, at the Crop Science Department of the then Faculty of Agriculture of the University of Ghana, from 1989 to 2000.

== Early life and education ==
Yeboah was born on 5 May 1954 in Atiwa West in the Eastern Region of Ghana. He attended the University of Ghana and obtained his Bachelor of Science after he studied Agricultural science.

== Politics ==
Yeboah was first elected into parliament on the ticket of the New Patriotic Party during the December 2000 Ghanaian General elections representing the Atiwa West Constituency in the Eastern Region. He polled 18,689 votes out of the 27,959 valid votes cast representing 66.80%. He polled 25,468 votes out of the 34,314 valid votes cast representing 74.20% in 2004. He was defeated by Kwasi Annoh Ankamah in their Party's Parliamentary Primary in 2008.

== Career ==
Yeboah was entomologist by profession. He was the Deputy minister of Foreign Affairs and a former member of Parliament to the Atiwa West Constituency.

== Personal life and death ==
Yeboah was a Christian. He died on 30 January 2026, at the age of 71.
