= Capital punishment in the Gambia =

Capital punishment remains a legal penalty for multiple crimes in The Gambia. However, the country has taken recent steps towards abolishing the death penalty.

== Execution methods ==
Under Gambian law, hanging and the firing squad are both permitted methods for carrying out executions. The Minister of Justice is tasked with deciding which method would be used in each execution. The Gambian Criminal Code historically called for executions to take place by hanging, and human rights organization Amnesty International published a 1989 document titled When the State Kills in which they identified hanging as Gambia's sole method of execution. However, in 2012, Gambia allegedly carried out nine executions by lethal injection.

== Post-independence developments ==
The first person to be executed after Gambia won independence from the British Empire in 1965 was Mustapha Danso. Danso, a constable in the military of the Gambia, was convicted of murdering Emmanuel Mahoney, the deputy commander of the Gambia's paramilitary field force. The murder, which took place in October 1980, and Danso's conviction and death sentence in July 1981, led to an attempted coup d'état of the government on 30 July 1981. On 30 September 1981, he was executed in the nation's capital, Banjul. Until 2012, this was the most recent execution in the country.

Between independence from the British Empire in 1965 and their initial plans to abolish the death penalty in April 1993, 87 people were sentenced to death. Most of them were sentenced due to their involvement in an unsuccessful coup attempt against President Dawda Jawara which took place on July 30, 1981. The coup attempt resulted in many deaths and many trials; by May 1984, there were 64 people involved in the coup attempt who were under death sentences. All of the sentences were commuted to life imprisonment by 1985. In September 1985, Jawara announced publicly that he was personally opposed to the death penalty.

The number of death sentences in The Gambia steadily decreased from 1984 onward. Sometime in 1992, businessman Lamin Darbo was convicted of murder and sentenced to death, becoming the first person to be sentenced to death by Gambia since 1987. In January 1992, two men received death sentences for murder from the Supreme Court of The Gambia, and in March of the same year, a third man, also convicted of murder, was sentenced to death as well. However, on December 31, 1992, the two prisoners who received their death sentences in January 1992 allegedly had their death sentences commuted to life imprisonment.

In August 1991, Mamadu Jarju, a prisoner and a criminal suspect, was tortured and ultimately died in custody due to his mistreatment while in custody. Two police officers were judged to have been responsible for Jarju's death, and they went on trial in October 1991. In February 1992, the Supreme Court of The Gambia found them guilty of "assault occasioning bodily harm" and sentenced them to three years' imprisonment; a third officer was acquitted. Following that court decision, Gambia's Director of Public Prosecutions appealed both the acquittal and the court's failure to convict the other two officers of murder, as a murder conviction could have led to a death sentence. In December 1992, the third officer's acquittal was affirmed on appeal, but the Court of Appeal of The Gambia ruled that the other two officers should have been convicted of murder for Jarju's death, and they were sentenced to death afterwards.

In April 1993, President Jawara formally proposed abolishing the death penalty. The Gambian Parliament passed bills to remove the country's death penalty laws from their criminal code in April 1993 by overwhelmingly supportive margins. Between independence in 1965 and the initial abolition in 1993, only one execution, that of Danso, was carried out in the country.

In 1994, Yahya Jammeh took power following a coup. In 1995, he reinstated the death penalty.

== 21st century usage ==
In April 2011, The Gambia abolished the death penalty for drug offences. In December 2011, there were approximately 42 inmates under a death sentence in Gambia. Gambian law currently permits the death penalty for treason, murder, and terrorism. The Gambian Constitution specifically prohibits the death penalty for any civilian crimes other than murder.

Prior to 2012, the most recent execution in The Gambia had been that of Mustapha Danso in 1981. Like many sub-Saharan African nations, The Gambia had taken measures throughout the end of the 20th century and the beginning of the 21st century to reduce both the number of crimes that were punishable by death, and the number of prisoners that they would sentence to death.

On August 23, 2012, The Gambia ended a 31-year moratorium on executions with the executions of nine death row inmates. President Jammeh claimed that his motivation for carrying out the executions, and his plans to expand the list of crimes punishable by death in the Gambian criminal code, was motivated by a rising violent crime rate. Although some reports state that the executions were carried out by firing squad, other accounts state that they were all actually carried out by lethal injection; if the latter is true, it would have been the first time the country ever utilized that method of execution. Two of the executed inmates were Senegalese, including one woman. Three of the inmates had purportedly been executed for treason. Six were civilians, while three were members of the military. All of the inmates were convicted of crimes involving murder. One of the men executed was Lamin Darbo, the businessman who was convicted of murder in 1992; the others were Lamin Jarju, L.F. Jammeh, Alieu Bah, Gibril Bah, Malang Sonko, Abubacar Yarbo, Dawda Bojang, and the female Senegalese national Tabara Samba. The executions took place at the infamous Mile 2 Prison located between Serrekunda and Banjul. At the time, there had been 47 or 48 condemned inmates on Gambia's death row. After the nine executions, the remaining 38 or 39 death row inmates were moved from their cells to the site where executions in the country took place, with officials announcing plans to execute them all by mid-September 2012. Gambian officials transported the bodies out of the prison via van, but they refused to disclose the locations where they had buried the executed inmates.

The executions, and The Gambia's plans to execute the rest of their death row inmates, drew worldwide condemnation, particularly from human rights groups. The African Union, the European Union, and the United Kingdom condemned the executions as well. Senegal also condemned the executions and demanded that The Gambia spare the life of another Senegalese national who was among the 38 or 39 inmates awaiting execution and remaining on death row. The executions were criticized for several reasons, with one being that at least three of the inmates (Malang Sonko, Tabara Samba, and Abubacar Yarbo) had not yet exhausted their appeals or had their cases heard by the Supreme Court of the Gambia, which was a violation of the Gambian Constitution. Amnesty International also claimed that the inmates were not informed that they were to be executed until they were removed from their cells and taken to the place of execution; the organization called the executions "a violation of international and regional human rights standards, as well as applicable national law." Several of the inmates, particularly those convicted of treason and other political crimes, were alleged to have not received fair, traditional trials or due process. On behalf of the United Nations' Office of the High Commissioner for Human Rights, Christof Heyns, assigned by the UN, sent a message to then-President Jammeh to condemn the completed and planned executions. The UN Special Rapporteur on Extrajudicial Executions and the UN Special Rapporteur on Torture criticized the "secret" and "arbitrary" nature of the executions, with the latter stating, "Secret executions violate the rights of the convict and the family members to prepare for death. . . . Secrecy and the refusal to hand over remains to families are especially cruel features of capital punishment." Four years after the executions, the families of the executed inmates still had not received the bodies.

== Moratorium and moves towards abolition ==
In January 2012, Amadou Scattred Janneh, a former Minister of Information and Communication, was convicted of treason. However, the High Court in Banjul, a trial court, ordered him to be sentenced to a maximum of life imprisonment, as they found in sentencing him that the death penalty for treason was unconstitutional. In October of the same year, however, the Gambian Supreme Court upheld the death penalty for treason, albeit not in Amadou Janneh's case, and his life sentence was allowed to stand.

On 21 September 2017, Gambian President Adama Barrow signed the Second Optional Protocol to the International Covenant on Civil and Political Rights. Countries that are signatories to the Second Optional Protocol commit themselves to abolishing the death penalty.

On February 18, 2018, while commemorating the 53rd anniversary of The Gambia's independence from the British Empire, Barrow announced an official moratorium on executions. The gesture was also part of Barrow's attempt to rebuild and introduce human rights reforms after the removal of authoritarian President Jammeh, a proponent of the death penalty, the previous year. In September of the same year, Gambia also formally ratified the Second Optional Protocol to the International Covenant on Civil and Political Rights.

On May 7, 2019, President Barrow commuted the death sentences of all 22 people remaining on The Gambia's death row. Alongside the commutations, the Attorney General and Minister of Justice, Abubacar Tambadou, announced The Gambia's commitment to abolishing the death penalty permanently. As of May 2019, Gambia has no prisoners under a death sentence. Officials from Amnesty International announced that they had met with President Barrow to discuss initiatives Barrow could take towards protecting Gambian human rights, involving abolishing the death penalty and commuting all death sentences to life imprisonment. Tambadou also acknowledged that public opinion on the death penalty among Gambian citizens is split and that the country is awaiting the results of a report by the Constitutional Review Commission (CRC) before taking further steps on the future of capital punishment.

== See also ==
Death Penalty in the British Commonwealth
