= New Vision (disambiguation) =

New Vision may refer to:

== Media ==
- New Vision, a Ugandan English language newspaper
  - New Vision Group, a Ugandan publishing group
- New Vision Television, a Californian broadcasting company
- New Vision 9, a brand name once used by Philippine television network Radio Philippines Network

== Arts ==
- New Vision (Neues Sehen), a photographic movement of the 1920s and 1930s
- New Vision Gallery, a former art gallery in Auckland, New Zealand
- Al Ru’yah al Jadida (The New Vision), a 20th-century artists' collective in Iraq

== Other uses ==
- New Vision (electoral alliance), an electoral alliance in the Republic of Ireland
- New Vision Party, a political party in the Republic of Ghana
