= Omane =

Omane could be both a middle name and a surname. Notable people with this name include:

- Edward Omane Boamah (1974–2025), Ghanaian politician
- Isaac Antwi Omane, former Ghanaian diplomat
- S. S. Omane (died 2014), Ghanaian police officer
