= Asafo (disambiguation) =

Asafo may refer to:

- Asafo, traditional Akan fighting group
- Kwahu Asafo, a town in the Eastern Region of Ghana
- Asafo Kumasi, a town
