= Legon Observer =

Newspaper agency in Legon, Ghana

The Legon Observer, the journal of the Legon Society for National Affairs (LSNA), was established in July 1966 as a fortnightly publication. With a base in the political science faculty of the University of Ghana at Legon, it established itself as an important critical voice during the military rule of the National Liberation Council. In the 1969 elections it called for a "third force", between Komla Agbeli Gbedemah's National Alliance of Liberals and Kofi Abrefa Busia's Progress Party. Some supported the All People's Congress, led by John Bilson, who later ran for president as a Third Force Party candidate. From 1974 to 1978 the newspaper was effectively banned: General Acheampong withheld foreign exchange to block the import of newsprint, and arrested and detained editors.

Editors included Yaw Twumasi and Kwame Arhin.

In 2007 a New Legon Observer was launched, under the acting editorship of Ernest Aryeetey, then Director of Institute of Statistical, Social and Economic Research (ISSER) and now (year 2013) vice chancellor of the University of Ghana.
