= Atiwa (Ghana parliament constituency) =

Constituency in Ghana

- constituency for the Parliament of Ghana
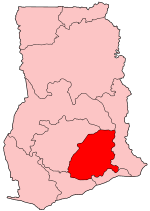
- District: Atiwa District
- Region: Eastern Region of Ghana

Current constituency
- Party: New Patriotic Party
- MP: Kwesi Amoako Atta

Atiwa is one of the constituencies represented in the Parliament of Ghana. It elects one Member of Parliament (MP) by the first past the post system of election. Atiwa is located in the Atiwa district of the Eastern Region of Ghana.

== Boundaries ==
The constituency is located within the Atiwa District of the Eastern Region of Ghana.

== Members of Parliament ==
Election	Member	Party
1992	William Obeng Boateng	National Convention Party
1996	Yaw Baning-Darko	New Patriotic Party
2000	Charles Yaw Brempong-Yeboah	New Patriotic Party
2004	Charles Yaw Brempong-Yeboah	New Patriotic Party
2008	Kwasi Annoh Ankamah	New Patriotic Party
2010	Kwesi Amoako Atta	New Patriotic Party

== Elections ==
A by-election was scheduled for 31 August 2010 following the death of Kwasi Annoh Ankama, NPP MP for Atiwa. He died during a trip to London. Kwesi Amoako Atta also of the NPP, won the seat with a vote of 20,282 (75%). This gave him a majority of 14,092 (52.1%).

2010 by-election: Atiwa Source:Ghana Home Page
Party	Candidate	Votes	%	±%
New Patriotic Party	Kwesi Amoako Atta	20,282	75.0	−1.4
National Democratic Congress	Emmanuel Atta Twum	6,190	22.9	0.2
New Vision Party	George Padmore Apreku	477	1.8	—
People's National Convention	Kasum Abdul-Karim	94	0.3	−0.6
Majority		14,092	52.1	−1.6
Turnout		27,540	53.3	−20.9

2008 Ghanaian parliamentary election: Atiwa Source:Electoral Commission of Ghana
Party	Candidate	Votes	%	±%
New Patriotic Party	Kwasi Annoh Ankamah	26,423	76.4	2.2
National Democratic Congress	Emmanuel Atta Twum	7,851	22.7	1.3
People's National Convention	Kasum Abdul-Karim	296	0.9	−0.3
Majority		18,572	53.7	−8.5
Turnout		34,931	74.2	−14.9

2004 Ghanaian parliamentary election: Atiwa Source:Electoral Commission of Ghana
Party	Candidate	Votes	%	±%
New Patriotic Party	Charles Yaw Brempong-Yeboah	25,468	74.2	5.4
National Democratic Congress	John Amponsah-Kyei	7,313	21.4	−9.0
Every Ghanaian Living Everywhere	Sarpong Aboagye Isaac	1,126	3.3	—
People's National Convention	Appiah Gyekye Dan King	407	1.2	−0.1
Majority		18,155	58.2	21.8
Turnout		34,868	89.1	—

2000 Ghanaian parliamentary election: Atiwa Source:Adam Carr's Election Archives
Party	Candidate	Votes	%	±%
New Patriotic Party	Charles Yaw Brempong-Yeboah	18,689	66.8	5.8
National Democratic Congress	Ben Ohene-Kwapong	8,489	30.4	−3.7
Convention People's Party	Joseph Baah	428	1.5	—
People's National Convention	Daniel Kingsley G. Appiah	353	1.3	−3.6
Majority		10,200	36.4	9.5
Turnout		29,959	—	—

The following table shows the parliamentary election results for Atiwa constituency during the 1996 Ghanaian general election.

1996 Ghanaian parliamentary election: Atiwa Source:Electoral Commission of Ghana
Party	Candidate	Votes	%	±%
New Patriotic Party	Yaw Baning-Darko	19,735	50.50	—
National Democratic Congress	Ben Ohene-Kwapong	10,480	26.80	—
People's National Convention	Emmanuel Darkwa-Adae	1,516	3.90	—
Majority		19,735	50.50	—
Turnout		31,731	81.3	50.9

1992 Ghanaian parliamentary election: Atiwa Source:Electoral Commission of Ghana
Party	Candidate	Votes	%	±%
National Convention Party	William Obeng Boateng			—
Majority				—
Turnout		11,846	30.4	—

== See also ==
- List of Ghana Parliament constituencies
