= Joseph Alexander Tuffour Sarkodie =

Ghanaian politician (born 1932)

Sarkodie Joseph A Tuffour

MP for Subin
- In office 7 January 1993 – 6 January 1997
- President: Jerry John Rawlings
- Preceded by: Thomas Kwame Aboagye
- Succeeded by: Sampson Kwaku Boafo

Personal details
- Born: 15 November 1932 Banko, Ashanti Region, Gold Coast (now Ghana)
- Party: National Democratic Congress
- Education: St. Joseph's College of Education
- Occupation: Politician
- Profession: General contractor

Sarkodie Joseph A. Tuffour (born 15 November 1932) is a Ghanaian politician who was a member of the First Parliament of the Fourth Republic representing the Subin Constituency in the Ashanti Region of Ghana.

== Early life and education ==
Sarkodie was born on 15 November 1932, at Banko in the Ashanti Region of Ghana. He attended the St. Joseph's Training College in Bechem where he obtained his Teachers' Training Certificate (Certificate B) in 1953.

== Politics ==
Sarkodie was elected into parliament on the ticket of the National Democratic Congress for the Subin Constituency in the Ashanti Region of Ghana during the 1992 Ghanaian parliamentary election. He was defeated by Sampson K. Boafo of the New Patriotic Party who polled 38,412 votes out of the total valid votes cast representing 55.70% whilst he polled 11,280 votes representing 16.40%. Asamoah Comfort, one of the contenders for the seat, polled 1,837 votes and Hussien Aminu Ali, also another contender, polled 1,815 votes representing 2.60%.

== Career ==
Sarkodie is a general contractor and a lay preacher. He once served as the Regional Manager of the Ghana Books Supplies Ltd., and the president of the Presbyters Conference of Ashanti. He is also a former member of Parliament for the Subin Constituency. He served one term as the member of parliament.

== Personal life ==
Sarkodie is a Christian.
