= Kwaku Baah =

Ghanaian lawyer and a politician

MP for Nkwakwa
- In office 1 October 1969 – 13 January 1972
- President: Kofi Abrefa Busia

Personal details
- Born: 21 July 1935 (age 91) Mpraeso, Eastern Region Gold Coast (now Ghana)
- Party: Progress Party
- Education: Northwestern University; Ghana School of Law
- Occupation: Politician
- Profession: Lawyer

Kwaku Baah is a Ghanaian lawyer and a politician. He was a deputy minister in the second republic, the minority leader in the third republic and vice chairman of the National Democratic Congress in the fourth republic. He also served as a member of parliament for Nkawkaw Constituency in the second and third Republic of Ghana.

== Early life and education ==
Kwaku was born on the 25th of August 1935 at Mpraeso. He had his early education at Mpraeso Presbyterian Middle School and from there he attended Mfantsipim School. He attended Ghana School of Law where he obtained his diploma in 1962. He received fellowship from the Northwestern University, Chicago for further studies in law and international Relations

== Career and politics ==
He co-authored the famous brief on Baffour Akoto's case by J. B. Danquah two months before he was called to the bar.

Right before Kwaku's departure abroad, he was slated for arrest due to his involvement with Pauli Murray in aiding J. B. Danquah in the defence of eight political prisoners arrested under the Preventive Detention Act during the Nkrumah regime. He returned to Ghana after the overthrow of Dr. Kwame Nkrumah.

He was elected member of parliament representing the Nkawkaw constituency in 1969. That same year he was appointed deputy minister of Interior. He served in this capacity until 1972 when the Busia government overthrown. He was also a member of the steering committee of the National Executives of Progress Party.

He was minority leader for the Popular Front Party in the third republic. In 1980 as a minority leader he caused a stir in parliament when he carried kenkey and yoke gari to the floor of parliament house to demonstrate the ordeals of the ordinary Ghanaian and his or her struggles to make ends meat under the PNP government. He was replaced with Samuel Odoi-Sykes due to an internal conflict with the leader of the party Victor Owusu as a result of a reshuffle in the leadership of the party, he was expelled together with J. H. Owusu Acheampong; member of parliament for the Berekum constituency. He together with Owusu Acheampong consequently declared that they will sit in parliament as independent members of parliament. The Popular Front Party called on them to resign so by-elections could be organised at their various constituencies. This was backed by the constitution if a member of parliament was switching parties however these MPs were not switching parties in this case they had become Independent members of parliament, they were therefore allowed to sit in the parliament house as independent members of parliament. At the inception of the fourth republic, he joined the National Independence Party led by Kwabena Darko. He later joined the National Democratic Congress in 1994 and was made vice chairman of the party. He resigned from the party in 2005 following incidents at the Koforidua congress. He cited cases of intimidations and alleged assault. He also accused the former president Jerry Rawlings for openly showing his support and dislike for some candidates contesting for positions in the party.

== Positions held ==
1965 - 1966-Consultant on Human Rights, United Nations Office of the International Confederation of Free Trade Unions (ICFTU), 1967 - 1968- Joint Secretary, Constitutional Commission of Ghana (Drafting 2nd Republican constitution of Ghana, 1968 - 1969- Joint clerk constituent Assembly (drafting and promulgating 2nd Republic Constitution of Ghana 1969 - 1972 Member of Parliament - Nkawkaw Constituency (2nd Republic) September 1969 - September 1970 - Ministerial Secretary (ministry of Judiciaries) October 1970 - January 1971 - Ministerial Secretary (Ministry of Defence) February 1971 - February 1972 - Ministerial Secretary (ministry of Presidential Affairs) 1979 - 1981 Member of Parliament - Nkawkaw Constituency (3rd Republic) September 1980 - September 1981 - Minority leader (3rd republican Parliament, Popular Front Party) 1972 - till date - Private legal Practitioner

== See also ==
- List of MPs elected in the 1969 Ghanaian parliamentary election
- Busia government
