= Atiwa District =

- Former District
- Seal

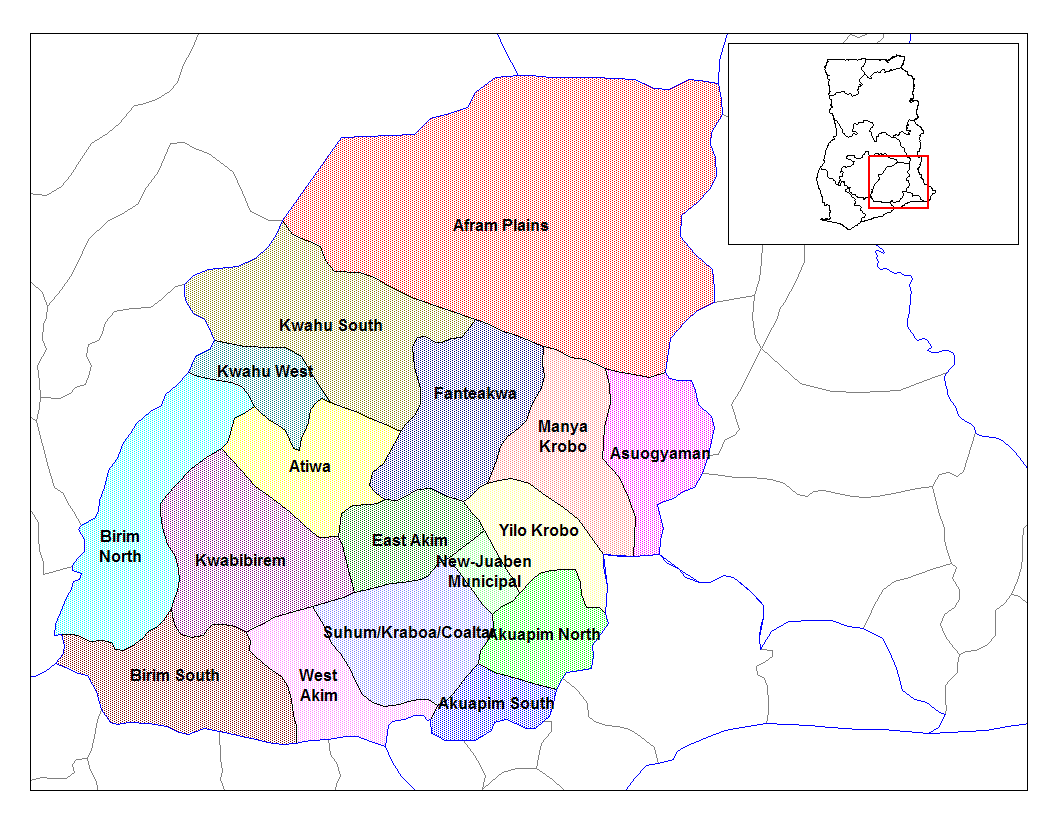
- Districts of Eastern Region

- Location of Atiwa District within Eastern
- Coordinates: 6°18′50.4″N 0°35′34″W
- Country: Ghana
- Region: Eastern
- Capital: Kwabeng

Population (2012)
  - Total: —
- Time zone: UTC+0 (GMT)

Atiwa District is a former district that was located in Eastern Region, Ghana. Originally it was formerly part of the then-larger East Akim District in 1988, which was created from the former East Akim District Council, until the northwest part of the district was split off to create Atiwa District on 17 February 2004; thus the remaining part has been retained as East Akim District, which it was elevated to municipal district assembly status on 29 February 2008 to become East Akim Municipal District. However, on 1 June 2018, it was split off into two new districts: Atiwa West District (capital: Kwabeng) and Atiwa East District (capital: Anyinam). The municipality was located in the central part of Eastern Region and had Kwabeng as its capital town.

== List of settlements ==
Settlements of Atiwa District
No.	Settlement	Population	Population year
1	Abomosu		
2	Adasawase		
3	Akim Sekyere		
4	Akrofufu		
5	Akwabooso		
6	Anyinam		
7	Asamama		
8	Asunafo		
9	Awemare		
10	Banso		
11	Bomaa		
12	Ekoso		
13	Enyiresi		
14	Kwabeng		
15	Moseaso		

== Sources ==
- "Atiwa District". Statoids.
- Districts: Atiwa District
