= Akyem-Awenare =

Coordinates: 6°19′N 0°35′W

Akyem-Awenare is a town in the Eastern Region of Ghana.

== Notable sons ==
- Kwesi Amoako Atta - Ghanaian lawyer and politician.
