= Kwame Arhin =

Ghanaian politician and historian

Prof. Kwame Arhin, also known as Nana Arhin Brempong, was a historian and politician in Ghana.

Arhin built his academic career at the University of Ghana, where he was an editor of the Legon Observer and had a long-standing association with the Institute of African Studies (IAS), having first been appointed Research Fellow there in October 1963. In October 1988 Arhin, who by then had served as acting Director of the Institute of African Studies for a year, was officially appointed successor to Kwesi A. Dickson as Director of the institute. Arhin served as Director of the IAS until the academic year 1997–8, when on his retirement he was succeeded by George Hagan.

In the 1990s Arhin served as a member of the Council of State and as Chairman of Ghana's National Commission on Culture.

He died on 6 September 2015.

== Works ==
- West African traders in Ghana in the nineteenth and twentieth centuries, 1979
- Traditional rule in Ghana: past and present, 1985
- A view of Kwame Nkrumah, 1909-1972: an interpretation, 1990
- (ed.) The life and work of Kwame Nkrumah, 1991
- Transformations in traditional rule in Ghana (1951-1966), 2001
