= John Bilson (politician) =

Ghanaian doctor and politician

John Bilson was a Ghanaian doctor and politician.

== Career ==
In May 1969, he founded the All People's Congress, which despite some support from the Legon Observer failed to make any impact in the 1969 parliamentary election. He contested the 1979 presidential elections as leader of the Third Force Party: in the first round of voting on 18 June 1979 he came sixth out of ten candidates, with 2.8% of the vote. In 1981, the Third Force Party was one of the opposition parties which tried to merge into the All People's Party, although political parties were soon banned after Jerry Rawlings's coup at the end of the year.

In 1992, Bilson launched a lawsuit challenging the eligibility of Rawlings to stand for the presidency, on the grounds that he was not a Ghanaian national.
