= Sampson Kwaku Boafo =

Ghanaian politician

Hon. Sampson Kwaku Boafo

Member of the Ghana Parliament for Subin Constituency
- In office 7 January 1996 – 6 January 2009
- Preceded by: Joseph Alexander Tuffour Sarkodie
- Succeeded by: Isaac Osei

Ashanti Regional Minister
- In office 2004–2006
- President: John Agyekum Kufuor

Personal details
- Party: New Patriotic Party
- Profession: Lawyer
- Committees: Defence, Interior and Judiciary Committees

Sampson Kwaku Boafo is a Ghanaian politician and a member of the New Patriotic Party. He was the Member of Parliament in the Asante region for the Subin constituency in the fourth parliament of the fourth Republic of Ghana.

== Career ==
Boafo is a Ghanaian politician who doubles as a lawyer and founder of City Temple International. He served as a Member of Parliament in that constituency for three consecutive occasions.

== Political career ==
Boafo first served as parliamentarian in Asante Akyem in 1979 during Ghana's Third Republic, headed by the late Dr. Hilla Limann. His political dream was however short-lived following the 31 December 1981 coup d'état led by Flt Lt Jerry John Rawlings. Mr. Boafo however came back to Parliament in 1997 for service under the Fourth Republic. He has served on various parliamentary committees including Defence, Interior and Judiciary. Boafo was the former Minister of State under the Kufour administration for the New Patriotic Party in the Subin parliamentary constituency in the Asante region. He was born in the 21st Century in Asante region. He was the Minister of Chieftaincy and Culture.

== Elections ==
Boafo was first elected into Parliament on the Ticket of the New Patriotic Party for the Subin Constituency in the Ashanti Region of Ghana during the 1996 Ghanaian General Elections. He polled 38,412 votes out of the 53,344 valid votes cast representing 55.70% against Sarkodie Josephj A. Tuffour an NDC member who polled 11,280 votes representing 16.40%, Asamoah Comfort an IND member who polled 1,837 votes representing 2.70% and Hussien Aminu Ali a PNC member who polled 1,815 votes representing 2.60%. He was re-elected into Parliament during the 2000 Elections.He won with 44,907 votes out of the 56,898 valid votes cast representing 78.90% against Kwame Adu Bofour an NDC member who polled 9.077 votes representing 16.00%, Huseni Aminu Ali a PNC member who polled 1,541 votes and Serwaa Kyeretwie a CPP member who also polled 1,373 votes.

Boafo was elected as the member of parliament for the Subin constituency of the Ashanti Region of Ghana in the 2004 Ghanaian general elections. He won on the ticket of the New Patriotic Party. His constituency was a part of the 36 parliamentary seats out of 39 seats won by the New Patriotic Party in that election for the Ashanti Region. The New Patriotic Party won a majority total of 128 parliamentary seats out of 230 seats. He was elected with 42,712 votes out of 61,133 total valid votes cast. This was equivalent to 69.9% of total valid votes cast. He was elected over Huseni Aminu Ali of the People's National Convention, Abraham Kwesi Mensah of the National Democratic Congress, Kwame Appiah Boateng of the Convention People's Party and Charles Kofi Hagan an independent candidate. These obtained 849, 11,098, 1,611 and 4,863 votes respectively of total valid votes cast. These were equivalent to 1.4%, 18.2%, 2.6% and 8% respectively of total valid votes cast.

== Personal life ==
Boafo is a Christian.
