= Abuakwa South Municipal District =

Municipal District in Eastern Region of Ghana

- Municipal District
- Districts of Eastern Region

- Location of Abuakwa South Municipal District within Eastern
- Coordinates: 6°18′50.4″N 0°35′34″W
- Country: Ghana
- Region: Eastern
- Capital: Kibi

Population (2021 census)
  - Total: 73,949
- Time zone: UTC+0 (GMT)

Abuakwa South Municipal District is one of the thirty-three districts in Eastern Region, Ghana. Originally it was formerly part of the then-larger East Akim District in 1988, which was created from the former East Akim District Council, until the northern part of the district was split off to create Abuakwa North Municipal District on 1 June 2018; thus the remaining part has been renamed as Abuakwa South Municipal District. The municipality is located in the central part of Eastern Region and has Kibi as its capital town.
