= Kwamena Ocran =

Ghanaian politician and medical practitioner

Member of Parliament for Tarkwa-Aboso Constituency 1979–81
- President: Hilla Limann

Personal details
- Party: People's National Party
- Profession: Medical practitioner

Kwamena Ocran was a Ghanaian politician, medical practitioner, Member of Parliament in the 1979 Ghanaian parliament and was also member of parliament for Wassa South Constituency.

== Education ==
Ocran had his master's degree in Biophysics and Environmental health sciences.

== Career ==
Ocran was a professor of public health at the Howard University. He was also a pharmacist.

== Politics ==
Ocran was a member of People's National Party and member of parliament representing Tarkwa-Aboso Constituency in the Western Region of Ghana. He was also the Minister of Education, Culture and Sports in 1980. He was also the Minister of Health.
