= Frank Bernasko =

Commissioner for Cocoa Affairs
- In office 1975–1975
- President: Kutu Acheampong

Commissioner for Agriculture
- In office 1973–1975
- President: Kutu Acheampong
- Preceded by: Daniel Addo
- Succeeded by: Paul Nkegbe

Central Regional Commissioner
- In office 1972–1973
- President: Kutu Acheampong

Personal details
- Born: 7 December 1930
- Died: 3 June 2010 (aged 79) London
- Party: Action Congress Party
- Other political affiliations: NRC (Military government)
- Occupation: Soldier, lawyer, politician

Military service
- Allegiance: Ghana
- Branch/service: Ghana army
- Years of service: ? – 1975
- Rank: Colonel
- Commands: Director of Education, Ghana Armed Forces; Director of Studies, Ghana Military Academy

Frank George Bernasko (7 December 1930 – 3 June 2010) was a Ghanaian soldier, lawyer, and politician. He served as the Commissioner of Agriculture among others in the National Redemption Council (NRC) military government of General I.K. Acheampong. He was also the founder and leader of the erstwhile Action Congress Party and contested the presidential election in 1979.

== Early life and education ==
Bernasko was born in Ghana. He completed his basic education at Cape Coast in the Central Region and Asante Mampong in the Ashanti Region of Ghana. His secondary education was completed at the Adisadel College also at Cape Coast. He then attended the University of the Gold Coast (now University of Ghana).

== Army career ==
Bernasko was an officer in the Ghana army and rose to the rank of colonel. He was once the officer in charge of education at the Armed Forces Recruit Training Center in Kumasi. He also served as the Garrison Education Officer in Accra. He held the position of Director of Studies at the Ghana Military Academy and Training School at Teshie in Accra. He later became the Director of Education for the Ghana Armed Forces.

== Politics ==
=== Military government ===
After the coup d'état of 13 January 1972 which overthrew the Busia government, he was appointed as the Central Regional Commissioner. He later also served as the Commissioner of Agriculture and then the Commissioner for the newly created ministry of Cocoa Affairs. He is also credited with being instrumental in the completion of various projects in the Region including the Regional House of Chiefs, the moving of prisons from the Cape Coast Castle and the Anomabo Fort. While Commissioner for Agriculture, he supervised the "Operation Feed Yourself" programme geared towards ensuring national food self-sufficiency. Bernasko is also credited with the success of the Dawhenya Irrigation Project and the increased uptake of agriculture which led to the first national agricultural show in 1974.

=== 1979 elections ===
Bernasko was one of the founders of the Action Congress Party, which was formed when the ban on party politics was raised in 1978. He contested the presidential elections in 1979 and came fourth, polling over 9% of the valid votes cast.

=== National Reconciliation Commission hearings ===
Bernasko appeared before the National Reconciliation Commission to answer allegations of abuse of human rights while serving as Central Regional Commissioner in the NRC military regime. He denied these allegations.

== Retirement and death ==
Frank Bernasko took up private legal practice after leaving the NRC government. In later life, he resided in the United Kingdom. He died in June 2010 at the St George's Hospital in Tooting, in the south of London.

== Honours ==
Bernasko was honoured by the chiefs and people of the Central Region during the Oguaa Fetu Afahye in 2008. This was in recognition of his services to the region especially when he was the Regional Commissioner in the NRC regime.

Political offices
New title	Commissioner for Cocoa Affairs; 1975	Succeeded by Captain J. A. Kyeremeh
Preceded by Daniel Addo	Commissioner for Agriculture; 1973–1975	Succeeded by Lt. Col. Paul Nkegbe
Preceded by ?	Central Regional Commissioner; 1972–1973	Succeeded by ?
Party political offices
New title	Action Congress Party Presidential Candidate; 1979	Party banned after coup
