= Kofi Obiri Yeboah =

Ghanaian politician (born 1975)

Hon. Kofi Obiri Yeboah MP

Member of the Ghana Parliament for Subin
- Incumbent
- Assumed office 7 January 2025
- Preceded by: Eugene Boakye Antwi
- President: John Dramani Mahama
- Vice President: Jane Naana Opoku-Agyemang

Personal details
- Born: 6 June 1975 (age 51) Kokofu, Ashanti Region, Ghana
- Party: New Patriotic Party
- Education: University of Ghana; KNUST; Ghana School of Law; Temple University; MIT Sloan; Yale School of Management; University of Law (UK)
- Occupation: Politician, Lawyer
- Profession: Legal Practitioner

Kofi Obiri Yeboah (born June 6, 1975) is a Ghanaian lawyer and politician serving as the Member of Parliament for the Subin constituency in the Ashanti Region. He represents the New Patriotic Party (NPP) and is a member of the Ninth Parliament of the Fourth Republic of Ghana.

== Early life and education ==
Kofi Obiri was born on 6 June 1975. He hails from Kokofu in the Ashanti Region of Ghana. He went to the University of Ghana for BA Hons Political Science in 1999. He again moved to Kwame Nkrumah University of Science and technology to pursue an LLB in 2007. He moved to the Ghana School of Law for a BL in 2011. He moved to Temple University for Certificate in Development in Finance in 2018. Kofi Obiri continued to the Massachusetts Institute of Technology for a Certificate in Management in 2018. He moved on to the University of Ghana for Maters in Finance in 2018. He then moved to the University of Law for his LLM in 2021.

== Career ==
Before politics, Kofi Obiri Yeboah was the founder and managing partner of Obiri Yeboah & Co., a legal firm specializing in litigation, real estate, oil and gas, corporate, and administrative law. In addition to his legal practice, he has served as a senior military officer in the Ghana Armed Forces for 18 years, including both local and international assignments.

=== Politics ===
Yeboah contested and won the NPP parliamentary primaries for Subin in January 2024, securing over 85% of the valid vote In the December 2024 general elections, Yeboah was elected MP with over 85% of the votes.

In Parliament, Yeboah serves on the Lands and Natural Resources Committee, the Chieftaincy, Culture and Religious Affairs Committee, and is Vice-Chair of the Petitions Committee.

== Personal life ==
Obiri is a Christian.
