= W. K. Asamoah-Tannor =

Ghanaian politician

Hon. William Kwesi Asamoah-Tannor

Member of Parliament for Aowin Amenfi Constituency 1979–81
- President: Hilla Limann

Personal details
- Party: People's National Party
- Occupation: Educationist
- Profession: Politician

William Kwesi Asamoah-Tannor was a Ghanaian politician and Member of Parliament in the 1979 Ghanaian parliament representing the Aowin Amenfi Constituency in the Western Region of Ghana.

== Career ==
In June 1991, Asamoah-Tannor was appointed as the assistant director of education.

== Politics ==
Asamoah-Tannor was a member of People's National Party (PNP). He was also the Member of Parliament for Asankragua.
