= Atiwa West (Ghana parliament constituency) =

Constituency in the Eastern Region of Ghana

- constituency for the Parliament of Ghana
- District: Atiwa District
- Region: Eastern Region, Ghana of Ghana

Current constituency
- Party: New Patriotic Party
- MP: Laurette Korkor Asante

Atiwa West is one of the constituencies represented in the Parliament of Ghana. It elects one Member of Parliament (MP) by the first past the post system of election. The Atiwa West constituency is located in the Atiwa District of the Eastern Region of Ghana.

== Boundaries ==
The seat is located entirely within the Atiwa District of the Eastern Region of Ghana.

== Members of Parliament ==
| Election | Member | Party |
|---|---|---|
| 2016 | Kwasi Amoako-Attah | NPP |

== Elections ==
Ghanaian parliamentary election, 2016 : Atiwa West Peacefmonline
| Party | Candidates | Votes | % |
|---|---|---|---|
| NPP | Kwasi Amoako-Attah | 16,980 | 78.43 |
| NDC | Joseph Owusu Sarpong | 4,519 | 20.87 |
| CPP | Justice Yeboah | 152 | 0.70 |

== See also ==
- List of Ghana Parliament constituencies
- List of political parties in Ghana
