= Isaac Osei =

Ghanaian politician (born 1951)

MP for Subin
- In office 7 January 2009 – 7 January 2017
- President: John Atta Mills & John Dramani Mahama
- Preceded by: Sampson Kwaku Boafo
- Succeeded by: Eugene Boakye Antwi

Personal details
- Born: 29 March 1951 (age 75) Kumasi, Ashanti Region (Ghana), Gold Coast (now Ghana)
- Party: New Patriotic Party
- Spouse: Marian F. Osei
- Children: 5
- Education: Achimota School University of Ghana Williams College
- Profession: Economic consultant

Isaac Osei is a former Member of Parliament for Subin Constituency in the Ashanti Region. He is also the former managing director of Tema Oil Refinery and chief executive officer of the Ghana Cocoa Board and one time Ghana High Commissioner to the UK. Osei serves as the chairman of Ghana Ports and Harbours Authority, Algebra Securities Ltd, Algebra Capital Ltd, and Intravenous Infusions Ltd.

== Early life and education ==
Isaac Osei was born on March 29, 1951, at Ashanti Newtown in the Ashanti Region, Kumasi. He attended the State Primary School in Kumasi from 1957 to 1960 and thereafter attended Achimota Primary School from 1960 to 1963. He entered Achimota School in 1963. After completing Achimota School in 1970, he studied at the University of Ghana, Legon where he graduated with B.Sc. (Hons) Degree in Economics in 1973. He further studied Mathematics and Statistics at the Economics Institute at the University of Colorado in Boulder, USA. Osei, in addition, holds a master's degree in Development Economics, from Williams College in Massachusetts, US from 1976 to 1977.

== Career ==
He began his career at the Ministry of Finance and Economic Planning in Ghana where he worked at the Industry, Mining and Forestry Division prior to moving into the Macro- Economic Section of the Ministry.

He founded Ghanexim Economic Consultants Ltd and consulted for the World Bank, USAID and the Ghana Government on several projects in Ghana. Mr. Osei was also the managing director for E.K Osei & Engineers & Contractors Company, as well as Intravenous Infusions Ltd, the largest manufacturer of intravenous infusions and small volume injectable in West Africa. Osei is an economist by profession. He is currently the chairman of Ghana Ports and Harbours Authority. He was previously the managing director of Tema oil Refinery and the chief executive officer of Ghana CoCoa Board.

== Political life ==
Osei was appointed ambassador to the United Kingdom and Ireland (2001–2006). Whiles in London, he was elected to the position of chairperson at the board of governors of the Commonwealth Secretariat, UK.

As chief executive officer of Ghana Cocoa Board (Cocobod) in 2006, Mr Osei led the Board to make investments in yield-enhancing schemes, cocoa disease and pests control as well as trade logistics infrastructure which saw Cocobod attaining an astounding production target of one million tonnes of cocoa within three years, a record unmatched at the time. He served as vice-chair of the executive committee of the International Cocoa Organization and was a member of the Consultative Board on the World Cocoa Economy.

He served as chairman of Cocoa Marketing Company (UK) Ltd and was a member of the board of Aluworks Ghana Ltd, Cocoa Processing Company Ltd and WAMCO. He served as the managing director of Intravenous Infusions Limited, prior to his appointment as High commissioner of Ghana to the United Kingdom and Ambassador to Ireland by John.A. Kufuor. He served in that capacity from 2001 to 2006. He stood as a Member of Parliament on the New Patriotic Party ticket for the Subin Constituency in 2008 and won. During the 2008 Ghanaian general elections he obtained 45,058 votes out of the 61,195 valid votes cast which sums up to 73.6%. In 2010 he stood as a presidential candidate for the 2010 New Patriotic Party presidential primary election. He came third after Alan John Kyeremanten, while the President of Ghana Nana Akufo-Addo was elected as flagbearer of the New Patriotic Party. He was appointed CEO of Tema Oil Refinery in 2017 until his resignation in 2019. He has been credited with embarking on a needed shutdown maintenance to improve the performance and reliability of the refinery after it had missed three cycles of scheduled shutdown maintenance prior to his appointment.

The former TOR MD is also credited with the payment for a 120tph steam boiler which increases steam generation capacity for plant operations and ensures the reliability of the Refinery's utility system.

== Personal life ==
He is a Christian (Catholic), who is married with five children, three of whom are lawyers.
