= Samuel Odoi-Sykes =

Ghanaian politician (1928–2026)

Ghana's High Commissioner to Canada
- In office October, 2001 – 2006
- Preceded by: Oliver Kenneth Kofi Lawluvi
- Succeeded by: Margaret Ivy Amoakohene

Chairman of the New Patriotic Party
- In office 1998–2001
- Preceded by: Peter Ala Adjetey
- Succeeded by: Harona Esseku

Chairman of the Greater Accra Branch of New Patriotic Party
- In office 1995–1998
- Preceded by: Peter Ala Adjetey
- Succeeded by: Jake Obetsebi-Lamptey

Minority Leader of Parliament
- In office 1980–1981
- Preceded by: Kwaku Baah
- Succeeded by: Parliament Abolished

Parliamentary Leader of Popular Front Party
- In office 1980–1981
- Preceded by: Kwaku Baah
- Succeeded by: Parliament Abolished

Member of Parliament for Ashiedu Keteke
- In office 1979–1981
- Preceded by: Parliament formed
- Succeeded by: Parliament Abolished

Deputy High Commissioner to the United Kingdom
- In office 1970–1972

Minister-Counselor and Deputy Ambassador to the Soviet Union
- In office 1969–1970

Personal details
- Born: Samuel Arthur Sykes; 1928 Accra, Gold Coast
- Died: 5 October 2026 (aged 98)
- Party: New Patriotic Party (1992 - present)
- Other political affiliations: Popular Front Party (1979 - 1981)
- Education: Accra Academy
- Alma mater: University of Ghana; University of London; Johns Hopkins University
- Occupation: Barrister-at-Law, information officer, foreign service officer, politician, teacher, organiser

Samuel Arthur Odoi-Sykes (1928 – 5 October 2026) was a Ghanaian politician, diplomat and lawyer. He served as Ghana's High Commissioner to Canada from 2001 to 2006 and Deputy High Commissioner to the United Kingdom from 1970 to 1972. He was National Chairman of the New Patriotic Party from 1998 to 2001 during which the party won its first presidential victory. In the Third Republic, he was Member of Parliament for Ashiedu Keteke (Accra Central) from 1979 to 1981 and Minority Leader of Parliament from 1980 to 1981.

== Early life ==
Samuel Arthur Odoi Sykes was born in Accra. He was educated at Accra Academy, graduating as a member of the class of 1948. He matriculated at University of Ghana, graduating with a B.A. in History in 1959. Whilst at university, he founded and became leader of the student wing of the United Party from 1957 to 1959 and general secretary of the National Union of Ghana Students from 1958 to 1959. Odoi-Sykes studied law at the University of London and qualified as a Barrister-at-Law at the Inner Temple before being admitted to the Ghana bar. Odoi-Sykes also received a diploma in American Foreign Policy from the School of Advanced International Studies at Johns Hopkins University, Washington, D.C.

== Early and diplomatic career ==
Odoi-Sykes began his career as a teacher at the Abuakwa State College, Kyebi, in the Eastern Region. He later joined the Ministry of Information as an Information Officer. He worked in the Central Region as an Assistant Information Officer.

In 1961, Odoi-Sykes entered the Foreign Service and was sent to New Delhi as First Secretary to Ghana's High Commission in India. In 1963, he was re-attached to be responsible for public relations in Ghana's Embassy in Washington, D.C. as Press Attaché. He was Director of Information Services Department in the United States and the Caribbean. He was subsequently appointed Director of the Overseas Information Directorate for the Ministry of Foreign Affairs in Accra.

He served as Minister Counselor and Deputy Ambassador to the Soviet Union, Moscow. He was Deputy High Commissioner in London until the 1972 Ghanaian coup which saw the shutdown of the Ghanaian diplomatic mission in London. After this, Odoi-Sykes served as a senior administrative officer in the Commonwealth Secretariat, London.

== Politics ==
In 1978, Odoi-Sykes defeated Major C. C. Bruce for the Ward 4 seat in the local government elections, thereby winning himself a seat on a district council in Greater Accra. The elections were held as a measure by the Chairman of the S. M. C. And Head of State, Lieutenant-General F. W. K. Akuffo to return the country to civilian rule and inaugurated on 9 December 1978.

Odoi-Sykes was a founding member of the Popular Front Party and selected as parliamentary candidate for Ashiedu Keteke Constituency (Accra Central). In 1979, Odoi-Sykes was elected as a Member of Parliament in the Parliament of the Third Republic. In 1980, after an internal wrangling in the Popular Front Party, Odoi-Sykes replaced Kwaku Baah and served as parliamentary leader of the Popular Front Party. In addition, Odoi-Sykes was the Minority Leader of Parliament because the Popular Front Party constituted the largest parliamentary opposition by number of members elected to parliament.

He was a founding member of the New Patriotic Party. From 1998 to 2001, he was National Chairman of the New Patriotic Party and within this period the party won its first victory in the presidential and legislative elections in December 2000.

From October 2001, Odoi-Sykes was Ghana's High Commissioner to Canada, Ottawa after being nominated by President John Kufuor. He served in this capacity until 2006 when he was replaced by Margaret Amoakohene.

== Death ==
Odoi-Sykes died on 5 October 2026, at the age of 98.
