= Mark Diamond Addy =

Ghanaian politician

Mark Diamond Nii Addy was a schoolmaster and politician in Ghana.

Mark Diamond Addy, manager of the Accra City Secondary School, launched the National Reconstruction Party on 2 May 1969. Later that month, the NRP merged with William Kofi Lutterodt's People's Popular Party. Ten years later, Addy ran as an independent candidate in the 1979 Presidential election, finishing in 9th place with just 0.33% of the total votes.
