= Roland Atta-Kesson =

Ghanaian politician

Hon. Roland Atta-Kesson

Member of Parliament for Wassa West Constituency 1979–81
- President: Hilla Limann

Personal details
- Died: 20 August 2005 Accra
- Party: People's National Party
- Occupation: Lawyer/pastor
- Profession: Politician

Roland Atta-Kesson (died 20 August 2005) was a Ghanaian politician and Member of Parliament in the 1979 Ghanaian parliament representing the Wassa West Constituency in the Western Region of Ghana.

== Career ==
Atta-Kesson was a lawyer and pastor. He was also a board chairman of the State Insurance Company. He was also the chairman of the Publicity Committee of the National Co-ordinating Committee of Nkumaists (NCCN).

== Political career ==
Atta-Kesson was a member of People's National Party during the regime of Hilla Liman. He was also the deputy Chief Whip in the Parliament of Ghana. He was the national chairman for the National Convention Party and later resigned to join the National Democratic Congress.

== Personal life ==
Atta-Kesson was married and had six children.

== Death ==
Atta-Kesson died on 20 August 2005 at the Nyaho Clinic in Accra.
