= A. O. F. Tawiah =

Ghanaian politician

Hon. A. O. F. Tawiah

Member of Parliament for Bibiani Constituency 1979–81
- President: Hilla Limann

Personal details
- Party: People's National Party
- Profession: Politician

A. O. F. Tawiah was a Ghanaian politician and Member of Parliament in the 1979 Ghanaian parliament representing the Bibiani Constituency in the Western Region of Ghana.

== Politics ==
Tawiah was a member of the People's National Party (PNP) during the regime of Hilla Liman. He was also a member of the People's Action Party (PAP).
