= Enyiresi =

Coordinates: 6°26′N 0°35′W

Effiduase
- Urban area
- Location within Ghana
- Country: Ghana
- Region: Eastern Region
- District: Atiwa District
- Time zone: GMT
  - Summer (DST): GMT

Enyiresi is a town in the Atiwa District of the Eastern Region of Ghana.
