= 2010 New Patriotic Party presidential primary election =

The 2010 New Patriotic Party presidential primary election was a nationwide election organized by the Electoral Commission of Ghana at the request of the New Patriotic Party of Ghana for the election of a candidate that would represent the party in the 2012 presidential and parliamentary elections. It was held on 7 August 2010. The New Patriotic Party is the biggest opposition party in the Parliament of Ghana with 107 members of parliament out of 230.

== The contestants ==
The election contested by five aspirants. They were:

- Prof. Kwabena Frimpong-Boateng
- Isaac Osei
- Rev Kwame Koduah
- Mr. Alan John Kyeremateng
- Nana Addo Dankwa Akufo-Addo

== Election day ==
About 130,000 delegates were expected to exercise their franchise at 228 voting centres across the 10 regions in the country namely, Upper West, Upper East, Brong Ahafo, Northern, Central, Ashanti, Eastern, Western, Volta and Greater Accra regions.

The elections were conducted in 228 out of 230 constituencies in the country. There were no elections in two constituencies namely, Ablekuma South and North in the Greater Accra Region due to protracted court cases. Other constituencies like Obuasi, Subin and the latest, Asokwa, all in the Ashanti region which had also been bedeviled by lingering court cases have been cleared to vote.

Meanwhile, NPP delegates have been warned to avoid going to polling centres wearing party paraphernalia.

About 113,000 delegates are expected to cast their votes in the party's first expanded delegates’ conference where election would be done simultaneously in all constituencies across the country.

== The results ==
At the end of elections Nana Akufo-Addo won an overwhelming majority of the votes to emerge as the winner of the elections. The table below shows the entire national results obtained by each of the candidates.

Position	Name	Votes	Percentage
First	Nana Addo Dankwa Akufo-Addo	83,361	77.92%
Second	Alan John Kyerematen	21,820	20.40%
Third	Isaac Osei	1,109	1.04%
Forth	Prof. Frimpong-Boateng	398	0.37%
Fifth	Rev Kwame Koduah	294	0.27%

== The winner ==
Nana Akufo-Addo who won the election had earlier represented the party as the leader in the Ghanaian presidential election in 2008. He lost to the current president of Ghana, John Atta Mills. Nana Akufo-Addo is the son of Edward Akufo, a former president of Ghana.
