= Eugene Boakye Antwi =

Ghanaian politician

Hon Eugene Boakye Antwi
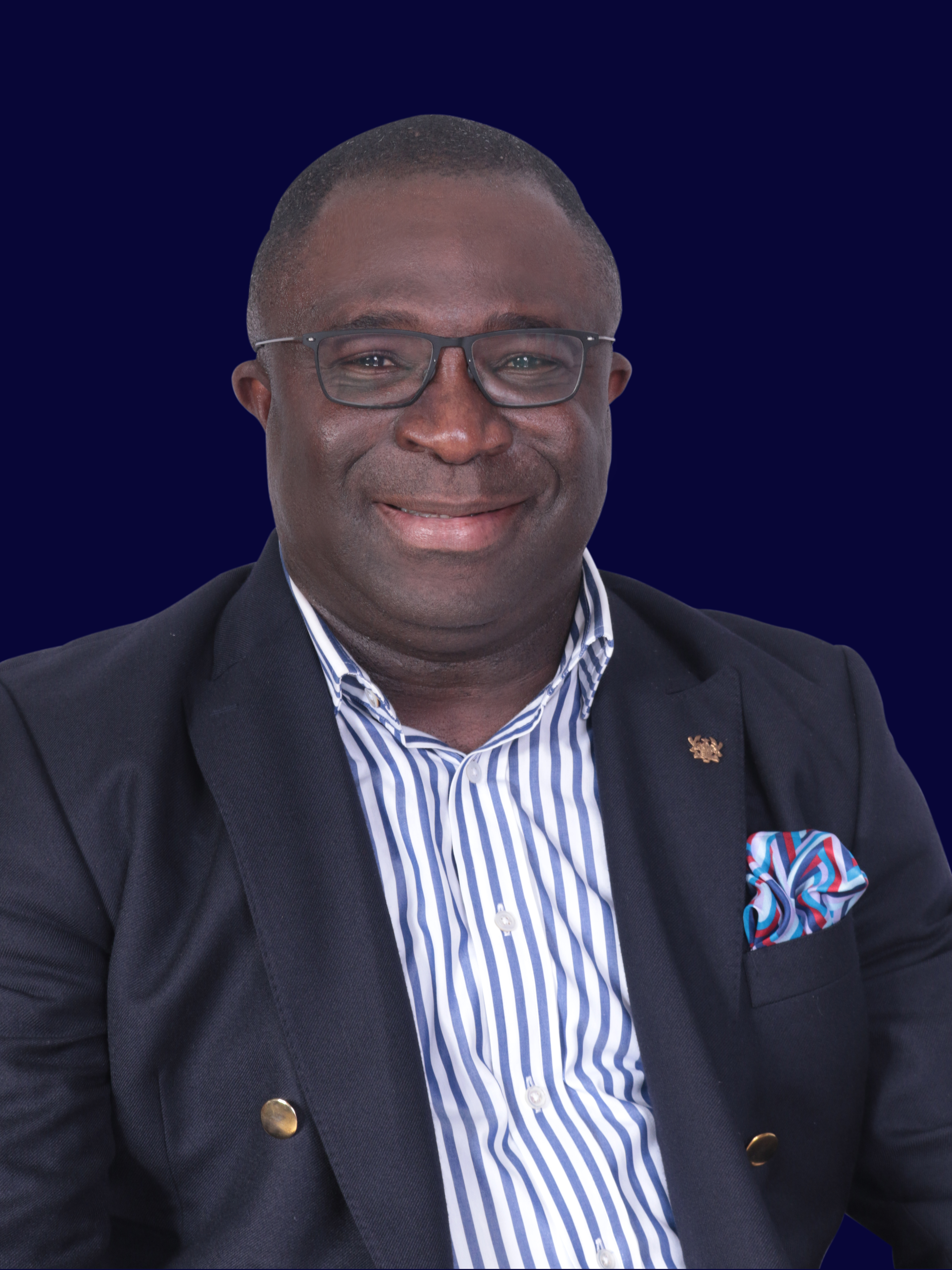

Member of the Ghana Parliament for Subin
- In office 7 January 2021 – 6 January 2025
- Succeeded by: Kofi Obiri Yeboah

Personal details
- Born: Eugene Boakye Antwi; May 7, 1970 (age 56) Baman Kwabre
- Party: New Patriotic Party
- Occupation: Politician
- Committees: Special Budget Committee, Lands and Forestry Committee

Eugene Boakye Antwi (born 1970) is a Ghanaian politician and former member of the Seventh Parliament of the Fourth Republic of Ghana representing the Subin Constituency in the Ashanti Region on the ticket of the New Patriotic Party. He is the former Deputy Minister for Works and Housing.

== Early life and education ==
He was born on 7 May 1970 in Baman, Kwabre in the Ashanti region of Ghana. He had his PGDIP from the Post Certificate Market Research. He had his Higher National Diploma from Westminster College, UK. He further had his BA in Business Administration from the University of Westminster.

== Career ==
He is a banker at the Barclays Bank now ABSA from 1999 to 2002. He was the Administrator of Lord Chancellors Department from 2002 to 2006. He was the Director of EUGASS Limited from 2006 to 2016.

== Politics ==
He is a member of the New Patriotic Party. He is the member of parliament for the Subin Constituency in the Ashanti region.

=== Committees ===
He is a member of the Special Budget Committee and also a member of the Lands and Forestry Committee.
