= Atiwa West District =

District in the Eastern Region of Ghana

- District
- Districts of Eastern Region

- Location of Atiwa West District within Eastern
- Coordinates: 6°18′50.4″N 0°35′34″W
- Country: Ghana
- Region: Eastern
- Capital: Kwabeng

Population (2021)
  - Total: 61,219
- Time zone: UTC+0 (GMT)

Atiwa West District is one of the thirty-three districts in Eastern Region, Ghana. Originally it was formerly part of the then-larger East Akim District on 17 February 2004, which was created from the former East Akim District Council, until the eastern part of the district was split off to create Atiwa East District on 1 June 2018; thus the remaining part has been renamed as Atiwa West District. The district assembly is located in the central part of Eastern Region and has Kwabeng as its capital town, off the Kumasi Anyinam road
