= Samuel Kwadwo Amoako =

Ghanaian MP

Hon. Samuel Kwadwo Amoako

Member of Ghana Parliament for Akim Abuakwa North Constituency
- In office 7 January 2008 – 6 January 2013
- Succeeded by: Joseph B. Danquah

Personal details
- Born: 20 March 1943 (age 83) Kukurantumi-Akim, Eastern Region Ghana)
- Party: New Patriotic Party
- Children: 6
- Education: Howard University; Columbia University
- Occupation: Politician
- Profession: Lecturer

Samuel Kwadwo Amoako (born 20 March 1943) is a Ghanaian politician and a member of the 5th Parliament of the 4th Republic of Ghana. He was once the member of Parliament for Akim Abuakwa North constituency in the Eastern Region of Ghana. He is a member of the New Patriotic Party.

== Early life and education ==
Samuel Kwadwo Amoako was born on 20 March 1943 in Kukurantumi-Akim in the Eastern Region of Ghana. He attended Howard University in Washington DC, Columbia University in New York all in the year 1986.

== Career ==
Amoako was a lecturer at City University of New York.

== Politics ==
Amoako was first elected into parliament on the ticket of NPP during the December 2008 Ghanaian General Elections as member of parliament for Akim Abuakwa North constituency.

He obtained 14,820 votes out of the 25,071 valid votes cast representing 59.10%. He however lost his party's parliamentary primaries in 2012 to Joseph Boakye Danquah Adu.

== Personal life ==
Amoako is married with six children. He is a Christian and a member of the Methodist church.
