= Kwahu Asafo =

- Rural area
- Country: Ghana
- Region: Eastern Region
- District: East Akim District
- Time zone: GMT
  - Summer (DST): GMT

Kwahu Asafo is a town in the Eastern Region of Ghana

== Location ==
Kwahu Asafo is located on the main Accra - Kumasi Highway.
