= Gifty Twum-Ampofo =

Ghanaian politician (born 1967)

Hon Gifty Twum-Ampofo Former MP
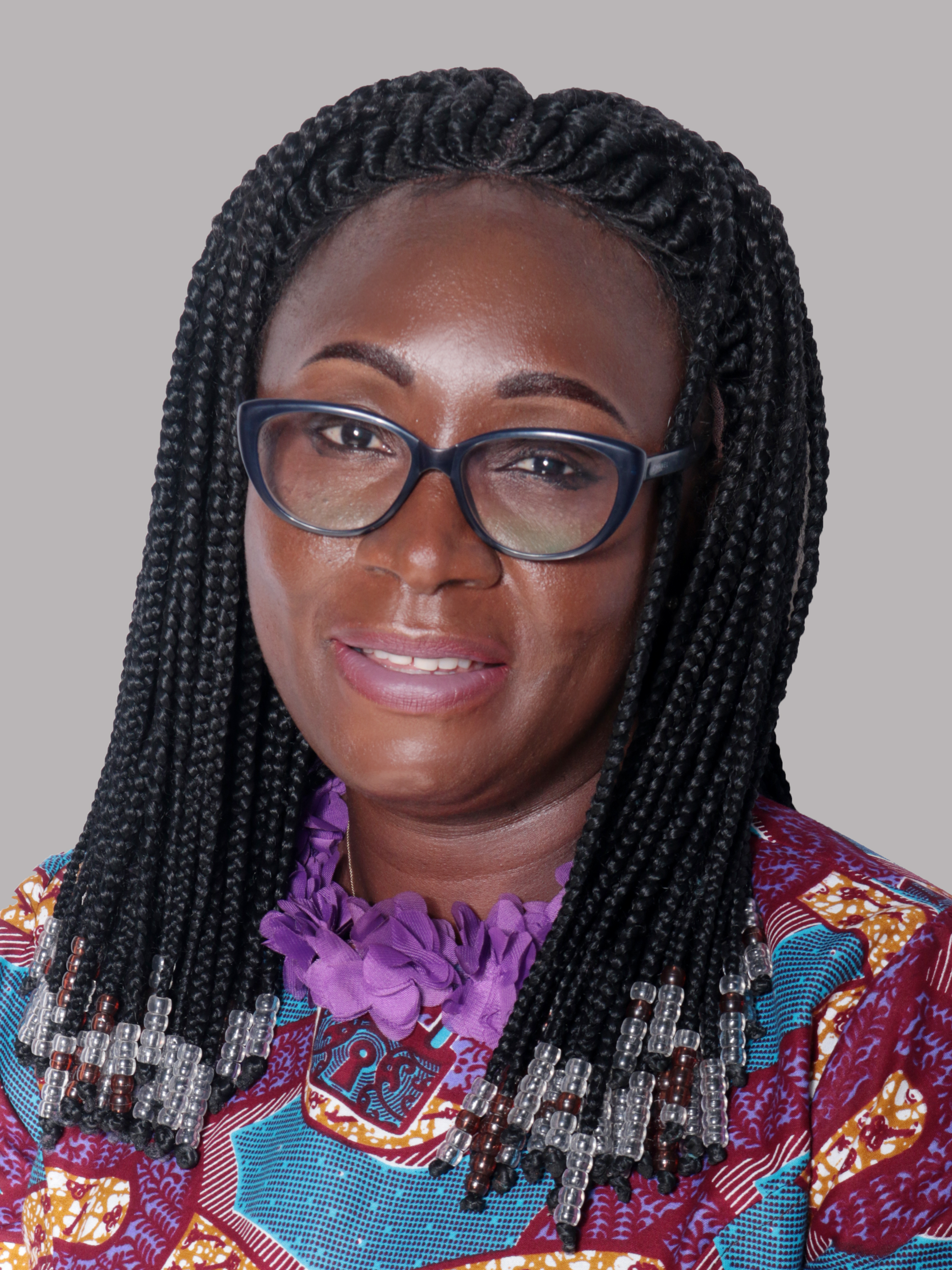

MP for Abuakwa North
- In office January 2017 – January 2025
- President: Nana Addo Dankwa Akufo-Addo
- Succeeded by: Nana Ampaw Kwame Addo-Frempong

Personal details
- Born: 11 June 1967 (age 59) Kukurantumi
- Party: New Patriotic Party
- Children: 3
- Education: University of Cape Coast, University of Ghana
- Occupation: Tutor
- Profession: Politician
- Committees: Public Accounts Committee; Foreign Affairs Committee

Gifty Twum-Ampofo (born 11 June 1967) is a Ghanaian politician and a former Member of Parliament of the New Patriotic Party. She is a former Member of Parliament for Abuakwa North constituency in the Eastern Region of Ghana. Ampofo is the deputy minister for Gender, Children and Social Protection in Ghana.

== Early life and education ==
Gifty Twum-Ampofo was born on 11 June 1967 in Kukurantumi, in the Eastern Region of Ghana. She had her GCE O LEVEL in 1986 and GCE A LEVEL in 1989.

She had her BSc. in Biology from the University of Cape Coast in 1997. She further had her MBA in Strategic Management in 2018. She also had her BSc from the University of Ghana.

== Career ==
Ampofo was a Science tutor at Akosombo International School before becoming a Member of Parliament. She was also the Head of Science Department and Head of Examinations at the Volta River Authority. She is currently the Deputy Minister for Education in charge of Technical and Vocational Education Training.

== Politics ==
In March 2016, she contested and won the NPP parliamentary primaries for the Abuakwa North Constituency in the Eastern Region of Ghana after the death of Joseph Boakye Danquah-Adu. She later won the Abuakwa North Constituency by-elections with 10,033 votes, making up 89.60% of the total votes cast, while the Ghana Freedom Party parliamentary candidate Samuel Frimpong had 263 votes making 2.35% of the total votes cast, and the United People's Party parliamentary candidate Isaac Kwarteng had 901 votes making 8.05% of the total votes cast.

=== 2016 election ===
In the 2016 Ghanaian general election, she won the Abuakwa North Constituency parliamentary seat with 17,838 votes making 59.23% of the total votes cast, while the NDC parliamentary candidate Victor Emmanuel Smith had 11,754 votes making 39.03% of the total votes cast and an Independent candidate Adjei Danquah Patrick had 524 votes making 1.74% of the total votes cast.

=== 2020 election ===
In the 2020 Ghanaian general election, she again won the Abuakwa North Constituency parliamentary seat with 17,653 votes making 53.2% of the total votes cast, while the NDC parliamentary candidate Charles Yeboah Darko had 15,551 votes making 46.8% of the total votes cast.

In 2024 parliamentary primaries election for the NPP, she was defeated in her attempt to represent the party by Nana Ampaw Addo-Frempong. Nana Ampaw secured 222 votes, surpassing his opponent who received 202 votes out of the total valid votes cast.

=== Committees ===
She is a member of the Public Accounts Committee and also a member of the Foreign Affairs Committee.

== Personal life ==
She is married with three children. She is a Christian and worships as a Methodist.

== Philanthropy ==
In December 2022, she presented foodstuff to over 35,000 people in her constituency.
