= Abomosu =

Abomoso Pomaase
- Location in Ghana
- Coordinates: 06°18′16″N 00°43′34″W
- Country: Ghana
- Region: Eastern Region
- District: Atiwa District

Abomoso is a town located in the Atiwa West District, Eastern region. It is dominated by the Akim clan which is part of the Akan tribe which covers 70% of the total population of Ghana. The residents are mainly farmers settled along and north of the Birim river. Area is dominated by the production of cocoa.

== History ==
According to history, the people were living in the northern part of Ghana. They had a Queen whose name was "Pomaa" and there was great drought in the northern part so she decided to migrate with her people to where they could find water and fertile soil. So she sent a hunter named "Abomo". He took an expedition to the south where he discovered a stream. He then went back to the Queen and gave her his report so the people migrated to where the hunter discovered the water. Upon arriving there, they named the stream after the hunter ("Abomo" "nsu"). "Nsu" means water in the Akim language so the name Abomosu means Abomo's water (the hunter Abomo's water). The people of Abomosu practice matrilineal lineage of ancestry.

== Geography ==
The Birim River is one of the main tributaries of the Pra River in Ghana and the country's most important diamond-producing area, flowing through most of the width of the Eastern region. The river rises in the east of the Atewa Range, flows north through the gap between this range and the Kwahu Plateau, then runs roughly south-west until it joins the Pra. It gives its name to the Birimian rock formation, which yields most of the gold in the region. Ghana is the second largest producer of gold in Africa.
