= Isaac Antwi Omane =

Former Ghanaian diplomat

Ghana's Ambassador to Cuba

Personal details
- Born: 27 November 1935 (age 90) Asokore, Eastern Region
- Education: University of Ghana; University of British Columbia; Yale University; University of Strathclyde
- Profession: Economist

Isaac Antwi Omane is a former Ghanaian diplomat and the Ambassador of Ghana to Cuba.

== Early life and education ==
Omane was born on 27 November 1935 and hails from Asokore, near Koforidua in the Eastern Region of Ghana. From 1953 to 1956, he had his secondary education at Prempeh College. In 1954, he obtained his Cambridge School Certificate and in 1956, the Cambridge Overseas Higher School Certificate. In 1962, he further had his bachelor's degree from the University of Ghana. In 1968, he also had his MA in Planning from the University of British Columbia, Canada. In 1973, he had his M.A. Economics from the Yale University, US. In 1980, he further had his PhD in economics from University of Strathclyde, Scotland.

== Career ==
Omane was the Chief Economist at the National Investment Bank in Accra from 1980 to 1986. In 2001, he was appointed the Ambassador of Ghana to Cuba and replaced Kwaku Danso-Boafo.

== Politics ==
Omane is a founding member of the New Patriotic Party.
