= Thomas Kwame Aboagye =

Ghanaian lawyer and politician

Member of the Ghana Parliament for Subin
- In office 1 October 1969 – 13 January 1972
- Preceded by: Alhaji Mohammed Babaley Sulemana
- Succeeded by: Himself
- In office 1979 – 31 December 1981
- Preceded by: Himself
- Succeeded by: Joseph Alexander Tuffour Sarkodie

Personal details
- Born: 4 October 1936 (age 89) Kumasi, Gold Coast
- Party: Progress Party; Popular Front Party
- Education: Adisadel College; University of London; Cambridge University
- Profession: Lawyer

Thomas Kwame Aboagye was a Ghanaian lawyer and politician. He was a deputy minister for defence during the second republic, and the member of parliament for the Subin Constituency during the Second and Third Republics.

== Early life and education ==
Thomas was born on 4 October 1936 in Kumasi, Ashanti Region, Gold Coast (now Ghana). He had his early education at St. Cyprian's School in Kumasi and Adisadel College in Cape Coast. He continued at King's College, London, University of London for his bachelor's degree and Fitzwilliam College, Cambridge University for his post graduate degree.

== Career and politics ==
Thomas was called to the bar at Gray's Inn, London.

At the inception of the second republic Thomas contested for the Subin seat on the ticket of the Progress Party and won. Two years later, he was appointed deputy minister for defence. He served in that capacity from 1971 to 1972 when the Busia government was overthrown.

During the era of the SMC he was a member of the People's Movement for Freedom and Justice (PMFJ); a movement that opposed the Unigov (union government) concept of governance that was introduced by General Ignatius Kutu Acheampong and his government. After a referendum that suggested that majority of the Ghanaian populace were in favour of the unigov concept of governance, he together with other members of the People's Movement for Freedom and Justice (PMFJ) had their assets frozen.

In 1979, during the third republic, he was once again elected to represent the Subin Constituency in parliament on the ticket of the Popular Front Party; the new name the Progress Party adopted for the 1979 general elections. He served as the member of parliament for Subin until 1981 when the Limann government was overthrown by the Armed Forces Revolutionary Council.

== See also ==
- List of MPs elected in the 1969 Ghanaian parliamentary election
- Busia government
