= St. Joseph's College of Education =

- Affiliations: Government of Ghana
- Location: Bechem, Tano South District, B30021, Ghana; 7.08108°N 2.02379°W
- Language: English
- Region Zone: Brong-Ahafo; Ashanti / Brong Ahafo
- Short name: Josco
- Source: An Atlas of The Forty Colleges of Education in Ghana.

St. Joseph's College of Education is a teacher education college in Bechem (Tano South Municipality, Ahafo Region, Ghana). The college is located in Ashanti / Brong Ahafo zone. It is one of the about 40 public colleges of education in Ghana. The college participated in the DFID-funded T-TEL programme. It was established in 1948 by Rev. Fr. Joseph Moulders. It is the first training college in the Brong-Ahafo Region and attained accreditation status in 2007.It is affiliated to the Kwame Nkrumah University of Science and Technology.

== History ==
St. Joseph's College of Education was founded in 1948 by Rev. Fr. Joseph Moulders, the then Parish Priest of the Catholic Church at Bechem. In 1947, Nana Fosu Gyeabour Akoto I, Bechemanhene and his elders donated the land on which the college was built on. It was the first training college to be established in the Brong-Ahafo Region.

The mission of the college is to build a Catholic Teacher Training Institution of excellence that offers holistic education for the integral development of staff and students in preparing disciplined, dedicated, competent, resourceful, creative and patriotic teachers for Basic Schools in Ghana after the example of St. Joseph who was obedient, hardworking and chaste in line with the motto of the college ‘OBI DAN BI’ (which stands for interdependence for the common good).

The programmes offered at St. Joseph's College of Education: two-year Certificate ‘B’, four-year Certificate ‘A’, Mathematics and Science Specialist, two-year Post-Secondary (Commercial/Vocational Skills) and General, four-year Post Middle Certificate ‘A’, Modular, three-year Post-Secondary Certificate ‘A’, Diploma in Basic Education, Sandwich for Untrained teachers, and Certificate ‘A’ teachers for the award of Diploma in Basic Education. The college enrolled only men until 1974 when women were admitted and became a mixed institution.

St. Joseph's College of education was granted accreditation by the National Accreditation Board (Ghana) with effect from 1 September 2007. The certificate of accreditation was presented by H.E. President John Kufuor. The college celebrated it Diamond jubilee with highlights from some of its achievements. Among the achievements are the production of high caliber professionals in the education enterprise, private and public sectors of the national economy, well maintained and expanded infrastructural facilities including Resource Centre, Science Block, Library, and e-Learning Centre. The college has distinguished herself in athletics and sports in the Ashanti/Brong Ahafo Training College Games. Tutors of the college have won the Best Teacher Award at District, Regional and National levels. The first ever National Best Teacher Award (2007) in Information and communications technology (ICT) was won by Mr. Matthew Adjei of the college. Prior to the development of the college, there has been contributions from the Board of Governors, Staff and Students, Most Rev. Peter Atuahene, Patron of the college, The Government, Nana Bechemanhene, GET FUND, TED, IFESH, MP and DCE Tano South, Old Joscodians, GTZ, GFW, JICA etc.

Principals who have administered the college are:
Name	Years served
Mr. I.J. Nichilson	1948-1950
Rev. Fr. P. R. Burges	Jan 1951 - Dec 1951
Mr. Me Kenna	1952-1956
Mr. Nkansah Dwamena (Ag.)	Jan 1957 - Dec 1957
Mr. S.I. Burke	Jan 1958 - Dec 1961
Mr. Vincent Ayivor	Jan 1962 - Aug 1973
M.K. Amissah (Ag.)	Sep 1973 - Aug 1974
Mr. John Anquandah	Sep 1974 - Aug 1980
Mr. I.F.. Afful (Ag.)	Sep 1980 - Aug 1983
Mr. Plas M. Otwe	Sep 1983 - April 1992
Mr. Samuel Anning (Ag.)	May 1992 - Aug 1992
Mr. L.A. Andoh	Sep 1992 - March 1997
Ms. Cordelia M. Boakye Yiadom	April 1997 - May 2003
Mrs. B.A. Prempeh (Ag.)	May 2003 - Oct 2003
Mr C.D.B. Mensah	Oct 2003 - June 2009
Mr. Anthony Agyeman (Ag)	June 2009 - Aug 2010
Mrs. Cecilia Quansah	Sep 2010 - May 2013
Ms.Elizabeth Oti Akenten (Ag)	May 2013 - Sep 2013
Rev. Msgr. Matthew Addai	Sep 2013 - to date
