= East Akim Municipal District =

Former Municipal District in Eastern Region, Ghana

- Former Municipal District
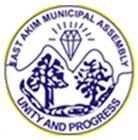
- Seal

- Districts of Eastern Region

- Location of East Akim Municipal District within Eastern
- Coordinates: 5°55′29.89″N 0°58′55.78″W
- Country: Ghana
- Region: Eastern
- Capital: Kibi

Government
  - Municipal Chief Executive: Owusu Twum Ampofo

Area
  - Total: 752 km^{2} (290 sq mi)

Population (2012)
  - Total: —
- Time zone: UTC+0 (GMT)

East Akim Municipal District is a former district that was located in Eastern Region, Ghana. Originally created as an ordinary district assembly in 1988 when it was known as East Akim District, which was created from the former East Akim District Council. Later, the northwest part of the district was split off to create Atiwa District on 17 February 2004; thus the remaining part has been retained as East Akim District. Then it was elevated to municipal district assembly status on 29 February 2008 to become East Akim Municipal District. However, on 1 June 2018, it was split off into two new municipal districts: Abuakwa South Municipal District (capital: Kibi) and Abuakwa North Municipal District (capital: Kukurantumi). The municipality was located in the central part of Eastern Region and had Kibi as its capital town.

== List of settlements ==
Settlements of East Akim Municipal District
No.	Settlement	Population	Population year
1	Akim Apapam		
2	Akim Tafo		
3	Apedwa		
4	Asafo		
5	Asiakwa		
6	Bunso		
7	Maase		
8	New Tafo		
9	Nkronso		
10	Old Tafo		
11	Osiem	6544	2017
12	Kibi	11,677	2013
13	Kukurantumi		

== Sources ==
- "East Akim Municipal District". Statoids.
- Districts: East Akim Municipal District
