= Mustapha Danso =

Mustapha Danso (died 30 September 1981) was a constable in the military of the Gambia, who in 1980 killed Emmanuel ("Eku") Mahoney, the deputy commander of the paramilitary field force of the country. Danso's actions ultimately led to an attempted coup d'état in July 1981 and his own execution.

Danso shot and killed Mahoney in October 1980 with a semi-automatic rifle. At his trial in December, Danso was found guilty of murder and sentenced to death. The unrest caused by the incident led to the attempted coup, which began on 30 July 1981 and was led by Kukoi Sanyang. However, President Dawda Jawara put down the revolt by 5 August with the assistance of Senegalese troops.

On 30 September 1981, Danso was executed in Banjul. He was the first person executed by the Gambia since it gained independence in 1965. After Danso's execution, no other prisoners were legally put to death in the Gambia until August 24, 2012.

== General references ==
- Tijan M. Sallah, "Economics and Politics in the Gambia", Journal of Modern African Studies, vol. 28, no. 4 (Dec. 1990) pp. 621–648
- Arnold Hughes, "From Colonialism to Confederation: the Gambian Experience of Independence, 1965–1982", in Robin Cohen (ed.) (1983). African Islands and Enclaves, vol. 7 (London) p. 69
- "Gambia executes first since 1965", The Globe and Mail, 1981-10-02, p. 18
