= Makola, Ghana =

Makola
- Town
- Location in Ghana
- Coordinates: 5°32′52″N 0°12′24″W

Makola is a town in the Greater Accra Region of Ghana. It houses one of the largest trading centres in Ghana – Makola Market – and the premiere campus of the Ghana School of Law.

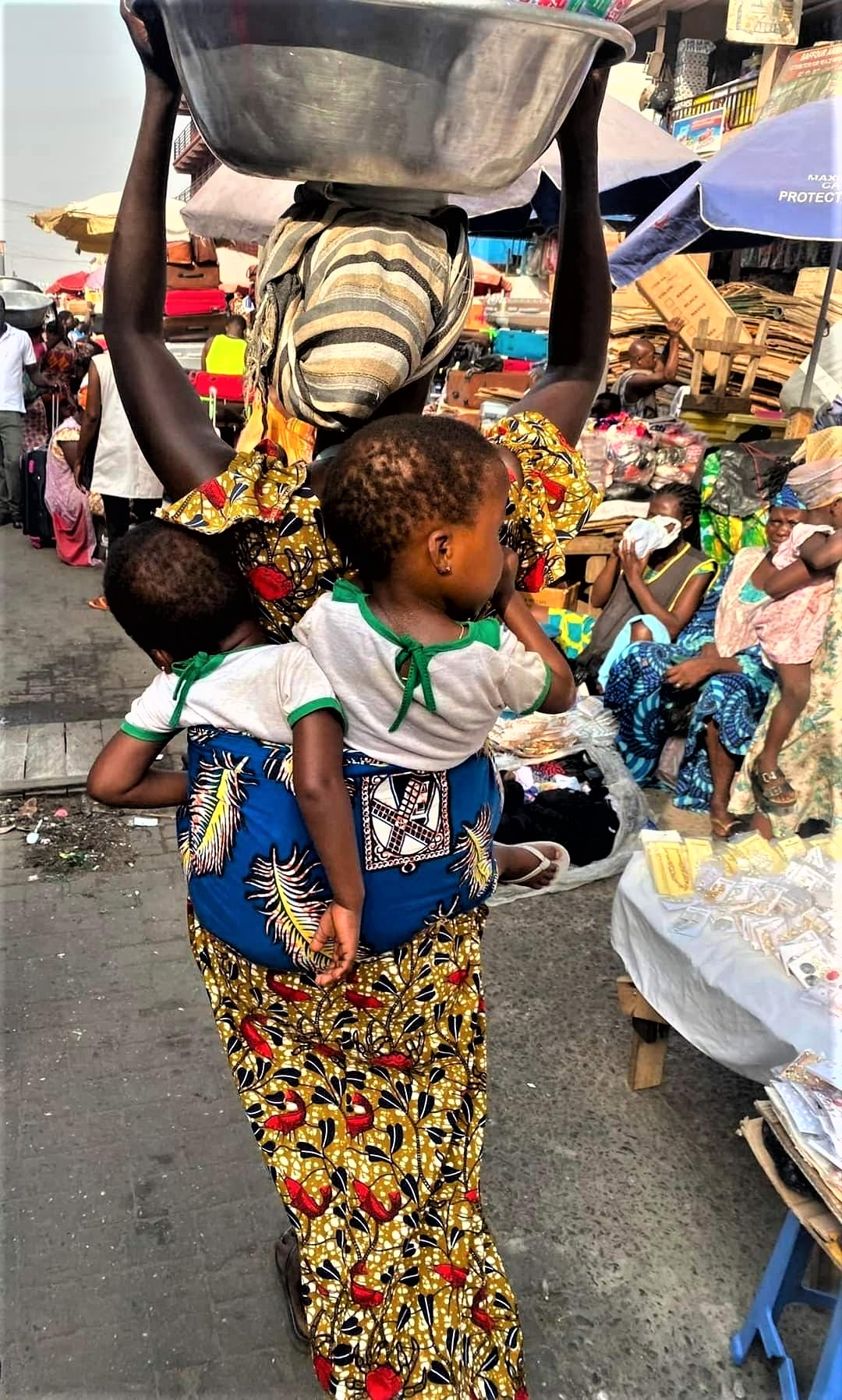
A woman selling water in Makola
