= Kwabeng =

- Town
- Atiwa District logo

- Location of Kwabeng in Eastern Region, Ghana
- Coordinates: 6°19′N 0°35′W
- Country: Ghana
- Region: Eastern Region
- District: Atiwa District
- Elevation: 748 ft (228 m)
- Time zone: GMT
  - Summer (DST): GMT

Kwabeng is a town in the southern part of Ghana and is the capital of Atiwa District, a district in the Eastern Region in the southern part of Ghana.
