= Action Congress Party =

Political party in Ghana

- Leader: Frank Bernasko
- Founder: Frank Bernasko
- Founded: 1979
- Dissolved: December 31, 1981
- 1979 National Assembly Election: 10 / 140

The Action Congress Party (ACP) was a political party in Ghana during the Third Republic (1979-1981).

In elections held on 18 June 1979, ACP presidential candidate, Frank Bernasko, won 9.4% of the vote and the party won 10 of 140 seats in the National Assembly.

Following the coup d'état of 31 December 1981, the Provisional National Defence Council took over government and banned all political parties including the ACP.

== Election results ==
=== Presidential elections ===
Election	Candidate	First round		Second round		Result
Election	Candidate	Votes	%	Votes	%	Result
1979	Frank Bernasko	167,775	9.38%	—	—	Lost ✗
Source:African Elections Database

=== Parliamentary elections ===
Election	Votes	%	Seats	+/–	Position	Government
1979	156,484	8.84%	10 / 140	New	4th	Opposition
Source: African Elections Database
