= Kengen, Ghana =

Town in Ghana

Coordinates: 05°00′N 02°39′W

Kengen, originally called Kenrene (pronounced kɛnrɛne), is a town in Jomoro District of the Jomoro constituency of the Western Region of Ghana. Other people have ascribed names such as Kangan or Kangane, but this is as a result of mispronunciation by non-local writers.
