= Social Democratic Front (Ghana) =

Former political party in Ghana

The Social Democratic Front (SDF) was a political party in Ghana during the Third Republic (1979–81).

In the 1979 Ghanaian general election held on 18 June 1979, SDF leader Ibrahim Mahama won 3.7% of the vote for presidential candidate and the party won three of 140 seats in the National Assembly.
