= Anyinam =

Town in Eastern Region, Ghana

- Urban area
- Location of Anyinam in Eastern Region
- Coordinates: 6°22′12.72″N 0°32′24″W
- Country: Ghana
- Region: Eastern Region
- District: Atiwa East District
- Time zone: GMT
  - Summer (DST): GMT

Anyinam is a town and capital of the Atiwa East District located in the Eastern Region of Ghana.

Anyinam is the birthplace of Osei Tutu. According to Gus Casely-Hayford, "Today Anyinam remains sacred to the Asante." The village contains a shrine in commemoration of Osei Tutu's birth.
