= New Vision Party =

Political party in Ghana

- Leader: Prophet Daniel Yaw Nkansah
- Chairman: Elder John Banghan
- Founder: Daniel Yaw Nkansah
- General Secretary: Daniel Boahene Nkansah
- Founded: 6 June 2008
- Headquarters: Accra
- Motto: Development for all
- Colors: Mauve, white and gold

Election symbol
- Lamp and Star

The New Vision Party (NVP) is a political party in Ghana. It was formed in 2008. The founder is Prophet Daniel Nkansah of the New Vision Pentecostal Church in Accra, Ghana. The party's colours are mauve, white and gold. Daniel Nkansah was nominated as the party's candidate for the Ghanaian presidential election, 2008. The party is perceived by some to have a religious affiliation though this is denied by its leadership who insist that there are people with various religious backgrounds in the leadership.
