= Third Force Party =

Political party in Ghana

The Third Force Party (TFP) was a political party in Ghana during the Third Republic (1979–1981).

In the 18 June 1979 presidential election, TFP candidate John Bilson won 2.8% of the vote.
