= United National Convention =

Defunct political party in Ghana

The United National Convention (UNC) was a centrist political party in Ghana during the Third Republic (1979–1981).

In the elections held on 18 June 1979 UNC presidential candidate William Ofori Atta won 17.4% of the vote and the party won 13 of 140 seats in the National Assembly. Akwasi Afrifa stood for and won the Mampong North constituency seat on the ticket of the United National Convention, whose roots were from the Progress Party of Kofi Abrefa Busia.
