= Kukurantumi =

- Urban area
- Location within Ghana
- Country: Ghana
- Region: Eastern Region
- District: Abuakwa North Municipal District
- Time zone: GMT
  - Summer (DST): GMT

Kukurantumi is the capital of the Abuakwa North Municipal District of the Eastern Region of Ghana.

It is noted for Adonten Senior High School, Ofori Panin High School, Only Believe Senior High Technical School, Bright Senior High School, Christian Heritage High School, Saint Paul High School. Kukurantumi is the district head of Abuakwa North Municipalities and also the St. Paul's Technical Institute. The Ghana Police Service has temporarily closed the Kukurantumi Police Station following a violent attack by some residents of the town
