= Popular Front Party =

Former political party in Ghana

The Popular Front Party (PFP) was the main opposition political party in Ghana during the Third Republic (1979–1981).

In elections held on 18 June 1979, PFP presidential candidate Victor Owusu won 29.9% of the vote and the party won 42 of 140 seats in the National Assembly. Owusu was defeated by People's National Party (PNP) candidate Hilla Limann, 38%-62%, in a 9 July run-off election.

It was a centre-right party, considered as an offshoot of the United Gold Coast Convention, which effectively evolved into the United Party in the late 1950s and the Progress Party in the late 1960s,

The Popular Front Party merged with other parties and became the All People's Party in the early 1980s, before evolving into the current New Patriotic Party.

== Notable members ==
- Nana Kofi Obiri Egyir II - party treasurer
