= Ofori-Atta =

Surname list

The Ofori-Atta family is composed of the bearers of an Akan language patronymic surname and their relatives. The family is of royal Akyem origins and has been active in business, politics, law and government in Ghana.

== Origin of the surname ==
The name Ofori-Atta is derived from the regnal name of the family's founder, Nana Sir Ofori Atta I.

Although matrilineality dictated that his progeny be denied the royal succession, their inheritance of the surname highlights the fact that they are direct descendants of the king of that name.

== Notable members of the family ==
Notable members of the Ghanaian political dynasty include:

- Ofori Atta I (1881–1943), Okyenhene or King of Akyem Abuakwa
- J. B. Danquah (1895–1965), member of "The Big Six" detained by the Gold Coast colonial government after the 1948 Accra riots, politician and writer, famous for helping to name Ghana
- Paul Danquah, (born Joseph Paul Walcott; 1925–2015), British film actor
- William Ofori Atta (1910–1988), a founding member of the United Gold Coast Convention, one of "The Big Six" and later foreign minister (from 1971 to 1972)
- Kofi Asante Ofori-Atta (1912–1978), politician and the fourth Speaker of the Parliament of Ghana
- Susan Ofori-Atta (1917–1985), first woman medical doctor of the Gold Coast
- Adeline Akufo-Addo, née Nana Yeboakua Ofori-Atta (1917–2004), daughter of Ofori-Atta I, wife of second republic president of Ghana Edward Akufo-Addo, and mother of Nana Akufo-Addo
- Jones Ofori Atta (1937–2020), economist and politician, Deputy Minister of Finance (from 1969 to 1972)
- [Danny Ofori-Atta] leader of the EGLE Party, founder of Databank in Ghana
- Nana Akufo-Addo (born 1944), politician and 13th President of Ghana
- Ken Ofori-Atta (born 1959), investment banker, co-founder of Databank in Ghana and finance minister in the Akufo-Addo administration
- Nana Oforiatta Ayim, Dan David Prize-winning writer, art historian and filmmaker
- Kwesi Amoako-Atta (1920–1963), Minister of Finance (from 1964 to 1966), Deputy Governor, Bank of Ghana (from 1960 to 1964), son of Ofori-Atta I
- Meri Nana-Ama Danquah, Caine Prize-nominated writer, editor and academic

== See also ==
- Bartels (Ghanaian family)
- Casely-Hayford
