= Ofori =

Ofori is a popular Ghanaian surname. Notable people with the surname include:

- Bennett Ofori (born 1995), Ghanaian footballer
- Curtis Ofori (born 2005), American soccer player
- David Ofori-Adjei (born 1949), Ghanaian physician and medical researcher
- Ebenezer Ofori (born 1995), Ghanaian footballer
- Eric Ofori Antwi (born 1994), Ghanaian footballer
- Esther Dzifa Ofori, Ghanaian diplomat
- Julius Ofori (born 1999), Ghanaian footballer
- Kelvin Ofori (born 2001), Ghanaian footballer
- Ken Ofori-Atta (born 1958), Ghanaian investment banker and politician
- Kofi Asante Ofori-Atta (1912–1978), Ghanaian politician
- Lawrence Ofori (born 1998), Ghanaian footballer
- McCarthy Ofori (born 2005), Ghanaian footballer
- Nana Ofori-Twumasi (born 1990), English footballer
- Nana Sir Ofori Atta I (1881–1943), Okyenhene, king of Akyem Abuakwa kingdom
- Oral Ofori (born 1980), Ghanaian-American blogger and journalist
- Pearl Akanya Ofori (born 1984), Ghanaian broadcast journalist
- Peter Ofori-Quaye (born 1980), Ghanaian footballer
- Prince Ofori (born 1988), Ghanaian-Beninese footballer
- Richard Ofori (defender) (born 1993), Ghanaian football defender
- Richard Ofori (goalkeeper) (born 1993), Ghanaian football goalkeeper
- Willem Ofori-Appiah (born 1994), Belgian footballer
- William Ofori Atta (1910–1988), Ghanaian lawyer and politician
