= List of rulers of the Akan state of Akyem Abuakwa =

This is a list of rulers of the Akan state of Akyem Abuakwa. Their title was Okyenhene.

#	Paramount Chief(Akyem Abuakwa hene)	Picture	Start	End	Comments
c. 1500 – Foundation of Akyem Abuakwa state (also called Okyeman)
First Dynasty (c. 1500 – 1733)
1	Kuntunkrunku		c. 1500	c. 1520	-
2	Apeanin Kwaframoa Woyiawonyi		c. 1520	c. 1540	-
3	Damram		c. 1540	c. 1560	-
4	Pobi Asomaning I		c. 1560	c. 1580	-
5	Oduro		c. 1580	c. 1600	-
6	Boakye I		c. 1600	c. 1620	-
7	Boakye II		c. 1620	c. 1640	-
8	Agyekum Owari I		c. 1640	c. 1660	-
9	Boakye III		c. 1660	c. 1680	-
10	Agyekum Owari II		c. 1680	c. 1700	-
11	Agyekum Owari III		c. 1700	c. 1733	-
Second Dynasty (c. 1733 – 1817)
12	Ofori Panyin I		c. 1733	c. 1738	-
13	Bakwante		c. 1738	1742	-
14	Pobi Asomaning II		1742	c. 1744	-
15	Owusu Akyem Ohenkoko (The "Red King")		c. 1744	c. 1750	-
16	Twum Ampofo I		c. 1750	c. 1760	-
17	Obirikorang Aboree		c. 1760	1770	-
18	Saforo Apraku		1770	?	-
19	Atta Wusu Yiakosan		?	1811	-
20	Asare Bediako Kwadwo Kuma		1811	1811	-
21	Kofi Asante Bayinyiye		1811	c. 1815	-
22	Twum Ampofo II		c. 1815	1817	-
Third Dynasty (1817 – 1866)
23	Dokuaa		1817	1835	Female Ruler
24	Ofori Atta Panyin		1835	March 1859	-
25	Atta Obuom		May 1859	May 1866	-
Fourth Dynasty (1866 – 1912)
26	Amoako Atta I		July 1866	2 February 1887	In exile at Lagos 14 May 1880 to 8 January 1885
27	Amoako Atta II		1887	February 1911	-
28	Amoako Atta III		April 1911	26 November 1912	-
Ofori-Atta Dynasty (1912 – present)
29	Ofori Atta I		30 December 1912	21 August 1943	-
30	Ofori Atta II		25/27 September 1943	13 June 1958	First Reign
	Kwabena Kena II		13 June 1958	14 April 1959	Regent
31	Amoako Atta IV		14 April 1959	5 December 1966	-
32	Ofori Atta II		5 December 1966	13 September 1973	Second Reign
33	Ofori Atta III		1973	1 May 1976	-
34	Kuntunkununku II		2 August 1976	17 March 1999	-
	Osabarima Kena Ampaw II		17 March 1999	4 October 1999	Regent
35	Amoatia Ofori Panin II		4 October 1999	Present	-

== See also ==
- Ghana
- Gold Coast
- Lists of incumbents
