= Ofori Atta I =

Ghanaian paramount chief (1881–1943)

Nana Sir Ofori Atta I
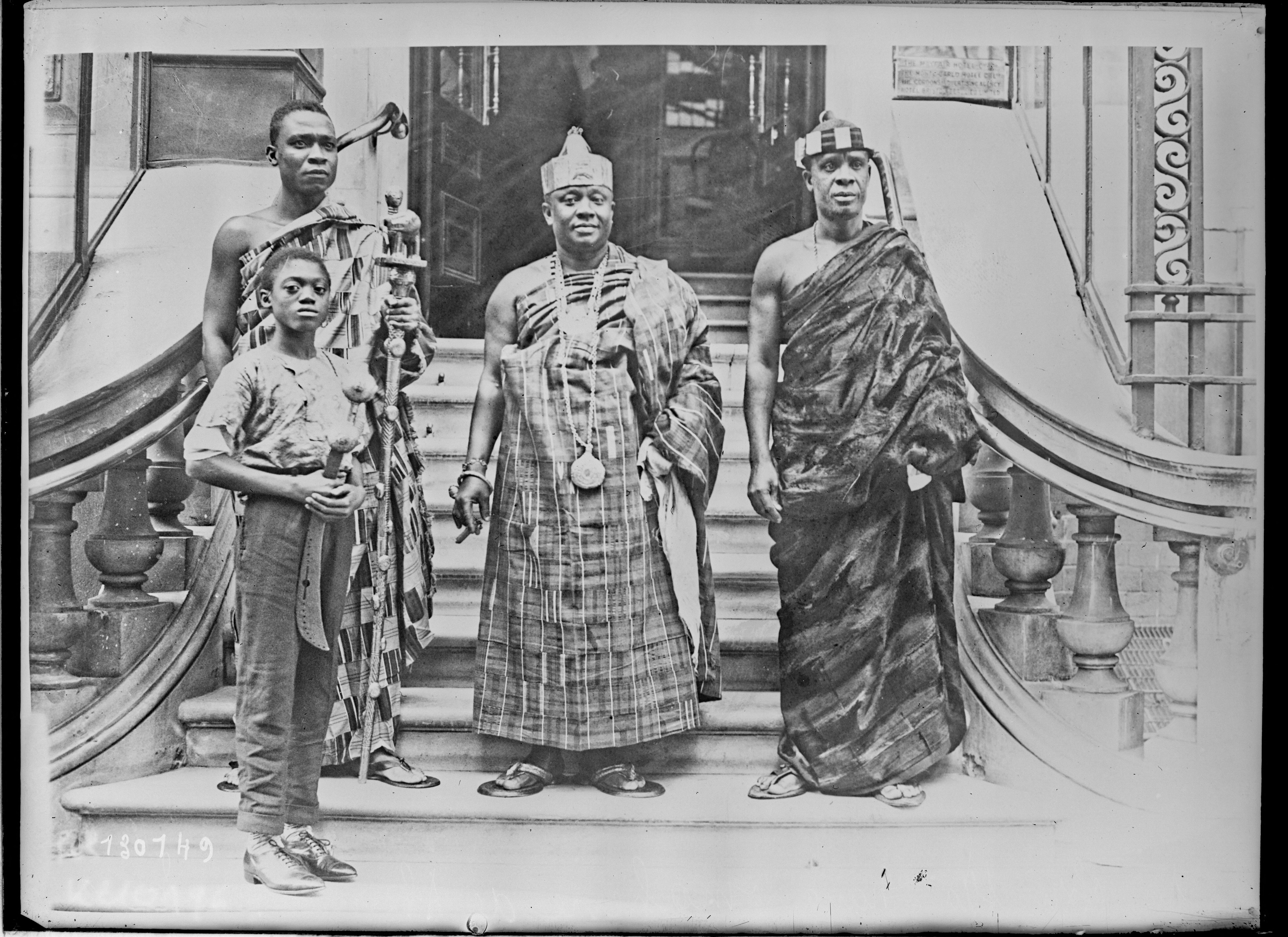
- Ofori Atta (center) in 1928

Akyem Abuakwa of Akyem Abuakwa
- Reign: 1912 – 1943
- Coronation: 1912
- Born: Ofori Atta; 11 October 1881; Kyebi, Gold Coast
- Died: 21 August 1943 (aged 61); Kyebi, Gold Coast
- Spouse: Agnes Nana Akosua Duodu of Abomosu
- Issue: William Ofori Atta; Kofi Asante Ofori-Atta; Susan Ofori-Atta; Adeline Akufo-Addo; Kwesi Amoako-Atta; Jones Ofori Atta
- House: Ofori Panin Fie of Kyebi
- Religion: Presbyterian
- Occupation: Barristers' clerk; Soldier; Paramount chief

Nana Sir Ofori Atta I, KBE (11 October 1881 – 21 August 1943) was the King of Akyem Abuakwa, a traditional area that stretches back to the 13th century and was one of the most influential kingdoms of the then Gold Coast Colony. He ruled from his election in 1912 until his death in 1943.

Ofori Atta was educated in Basel Mission schools and at its Akropong Seminary, now named the Presbyterian College of Education, Akropong. He left the seminary after two years to work as a solicitor's clerk, and then served in the West African Frontier Force, fighting during the Yaa Asantewaa War. Elected and enstooled King of the Akyem Abuakwa State in 1912, he became a member of the Legislative Council in 1916.

In 1934, he led a Gold Coast Delegation to London to petition the British Parliament for official majority of Africans on the legislative council, permanent African representative on the Governor's executive council and eligibility for non-chiefs to be provincial members of the executive council. He was also instrumental in setting up multiple schools, including Achimota School or College (formerly Prince of Wales School), where most colonial Gold Coast leaders and current prominent Ghanaian leaders schooled.

"Ofori Atta was the son of a senior official of the palace; his mother was the descendant of one of the founders of the kingdom.... Once in power, he was determined to return Akyem Abuakwa to its former glory."

He created the Ofori-Atta Dynasty by privileging education both among his sons and daughters, through two paths, "one firmly rooted in a concern for binding the state by the traditionally sanctioned method of multiple marriage and the other rooted in his strong case for 'modernisation' and 'progress'."

He was appointed a Commander of the Order of the British Empire (CBE) in the 1918 New Year Honours, and promoted to Knight Commander of the Order (KBE) in the 1927 Birthday Honours.

== Family ==
He was the brother of Dr J. B. Danquah (a founding member of the United Gold Coast Convention). He was the father of Aaron Ofori-Atta (the fourth Speaker of the Parliament of Ghana, a Minister of Communications and Minister of Local Government), Adeline Akufo-Addo (First Lady under the Second Republic), William Ofori Atta (a Minister of Foreign Affairs, Presidential Candidate of the UNC), Dr Kwesi Amoako-Atta (Governor of the Bank of Ghana and Minister for Finance and Economic Planning under the First Republic), Dr Jones Ofori Atta (Deputy Minister for Finance and Economic Planning under the Busia government), and Susan Ofori-Atta (the first female doctor in Ghana).

He was the grandfather of Nana Addo Dankwa Akufo-Addo (former President of Ghana), Ken Ofori-Atta (Ghana's former Minister for Finance and Economic Planning and founder of the Databank Group), Osagyefuo Amoatia Ofori Panin (the Okyenhene, current King of Akyem Abuakwa), Samuel Atta Akyea (former Minister of Works and Housing), and writer Nana Oforiatta Ayim.
