= Adeline Akufo-Addo =

First Lady in the second republic of Ghana

First Lady of Ghana
- In role 31 August 1970 – 13 January 1972
- President: Edward Akufo-Addo

Personal details
- Born: Nana Yeboakua Ofori-Atta; 17 December 1917
- Died: 21 March 2004 (aged 86)
- Spouse: Edward Akufo-Addo
- Children: 4, including Nana Akufo-Addo
- Parents: Ofori Atta I; Agnes Akosua Dodua
- Relatives: William Ofori-Atta (brother); Kofi Asante Ofori-Atta (brother); Susan Ofori-Atta (sister); Kwesi Amoako-Atta (brother); Jones Ofori Atta (brother)
- Education: Achimota School

Adeline Sylvia Eugenia Ama Yeboakua Akufo-Addo (née Nana Yeboakua Ofori-Atta; 17 December 1917 – 21 March 2004) was a First Lady of the second republic of Ghana as the wife of president Edward Akufo-Addo. She was the mother of president Nana Akufo-Addo.

She died at Korle-Bu Teaching Hospital in Accra on 21 March 2004, aged 86.

== Personal life ==
Born to Nana Sir Ofori Atta I, Omanhene of Akyem Abuakwa, and Agnes Akosua Dodua of Abomosu, she was the Abontendomhene (the queen mother of the royal house of Ofori Panin Fie of Kyebi). As such, she was officially styled as Nana Yeboakua Ofori-Atta.

Her elder sister was Susan Ofori-Atta, the first female doctor from the Gold Coast. Adeline Akufo-Addo's older brother was William Ofori-Atta, the Gold Coast politician and lawyer, former foreign minister and one of the founding leaders of the United Gold Coast Convention (UGCC) as well as a member of "The Big Six", the group of political activists detained by the British colonial government after the 1948 Accra riots, kicking off the struggle for the attainment of Ghana's independence in 1957. Her other brother was Kofi Asante Ofori-Atta, a Minister for Local Government in the Convention People's Party (CPP) government of Kwame Nkrumah and later Speaker of the Parliament of Ghana.
