= Nana Afia Dokuaa =

Ghanaian paramount chief

Nana Afia Dokuaa was the first and only woman to hold the office of ruler, or Okyenhene, in the history of Akyem Abuakwa in present-day Ghana. She ascended the Ofori stool in 1817 after her uncle Kofi Asante, and ruled until 1835.

She was a noted warrior, leading her people against the Ashanti 99 times.

== See also ==
- Akyem
- List of rulers of the Akan state of Akyem Abuakwa
