= Nana Kwabena Kena II =

Ghanaian diplomat and Chief

Okyenhene
- In office 13 June 1958 – 14 April 1959

High Commissioner of Ghana to India
- In office July 1959 – February 1962

Personal details
- Born: Kyebi, Eastern Region
- Spouse: Rose Korantemaa Okrah
- Occupation: Diplomat
- Profession: Chief

Adontenhene Nana Kwabena Kena II was a Ghanaian diplomat and Chief of Kukurantumi.

== Early life ==
Kena hailed from Kyebi in the Eastern Region of Ghana.

== Career ==
Kena was the Okyenhene (ruler) and Adontenhene of the Akyem Abuakwa State as a Regent from 13 June 1958 to 14 April 1959.

He was the chairman for the National Food Board.

== Politics ==
Kena was a member of the Convention People's Party.

== Ambassadorial role ==
Kena was the High Commissioner of Ghana to India from July 1959 to February 1962.

== Personal life ==
Kena was married to Rose Korantemaa Okrah and Samuel Okae Foster was their son, also a former diplomat who served as High Commissioner of Ghana to the United Kingdom.

== Death ==
Kena died on 28 August 1961 in New Delhi. He died at 48 years.
