= Abuakwa State College =

Location
- Eastern Region-Kibi; Ghana; 6.175626°N 0.544099°W

Information
- Type: Public high school
- Motto: Yaanom! Susubiribi!!
- Established: 1936 (90 years ago)
- Founder: 3 Methodist elders
- Status: Active
- School district: Abuakwa South Municipal
- Oversight: Ministry of Education
- Head of school: MR. Eric Adjei Sarpong Hanson
- Gender: Coed
- Age: 15 to 19
- Classes offered: Business, general arts, general science, agriculture science, visual arts, home economics
- Campus: Abuakwa State College
- Houses: 6 (Paa Willie, Akyem Asafo, Apea Menkah, J.B Danquah, C.J Banaman, E.K Ofori)
- Colours: Yellow and green
- Song: Susubiribi
- Nickname: ABUSCO
- Publication: Yaanom Susubiribi
- Alumni: Old Abuscodians Association

Abuakwa State College is a co-ed second cycle institution in Kibi in the Eastern Region of Ghana.

== History ==
The school was established in 1936 by three elders of the Methodist Church at Asafo-Akyem as a preparatory institution to prepare Ghanaian students who wanted to sit the then Junior Cambridge Examination. It was relocated to Kyebi in 1937 by Nana Sir Ofori Atta I who laid the foundation stone on 11 October 1937 thus becoming the founder and father of the school, Abuakwa State College was born to enable more students especially those from Akyem Abuakwa to enroll in the school.

== Headmasters ==
Name	Term
Kofi Asante Ofori-Atta	1944–1947
William Ofori-Atta	1947–1951
S A Allotey	1972–1978
A N Tetteh (ag)	November 1978 – December 1978
D K Asiedu	1979–1982
D W Donkor(ag)	April 1982 – August 1982
S A Birikorang	1982–1983
D M Ankomah	1983–1990
A O Botwe	1990–1993
E A Preko	1993–1995
K Antwi-Dako	1995–2001
Frederick Opoku	2002–2007
Mr Eric H. Adjei-Sarpong	2020–

== Notable Persons Associated with Abuakwa State College ==
=== Notable alumni ===
- Gibson Dokyi Ampaw, minister in the second republic
- Rose Akua Ampofo, First Ghanaian woman to be ordained as a Presbyterian Minister
- Martin Appiah-Danquah, Ghanaian politician
- Akenten Appiah-Menka, politician and businessman
- Ahmed Arthur, politician
- Kwesi Amoako Atta, current roads & highways minister
- John Odaate-Barnor, former Chief of Defense Staff
- Asare Konadu, Writer
- Jacob Kwakye-Maafo, physician
- Mzbel, Ghanaian musician
- Bob Pixel, Photographer
- Boahene Yeboah-Afari, minister of state in the Nkrumah government
- Carlos Kingsley Ahenkorah, politician

=== Notable staff ===
- Ken Attafuah
- Kojo Botsio
- Ebenezer Moses Debrah
- Samuel Odoi-Sykes
- Kofi Asante Ofori-Atta
- William Ofori-Atta

== School Code ==
0021303

== School Motto ==
Susu Biribi

== Accommodation ==
Day/Boarding

== Gender ==
Mixed

== School Denomination ==
Methodist

== School Category ==
Category B
