= Susan Ofori-Atta =

Ghanaian physician (1917–1985)

Susan Ofori-Atta DRCOG, DRCPCH, FGA
- Ofori-Atta in the 1940s
- Born: Susan Barbara Gyankorama Ofori-Atta; 1917; Kyebi, Ghana
- Died: July 1985 (aged 67–68); United Kingdom
- Education: Achimota School; Korle-Bu Midwifery Training School; University of Edinburgh
- Occupation: Physician
- Known for: First Ghanaian woman in orthodox medicine; Empowerment of women in Ghana; Work on childhood malnutrition
- Spouse: E. V. C. de Graft-Johnson
- Parents: Ofori Atta I (father); Agnes Akosua Dodua (mother)
- Relatives: William Ofori-Atta (brother); Kofi Asante Ofori-Atta (brother); Adeline Akufo-Addo (sister); Kwesi Amoako-Atta (brother); Jones Ofori Atta (brother)
- Awards: Royal Cross
- Medical career
- Field: Maternal health; Paediatrics
- Scientific career
- Workplaces: University of Ghana Medical School

Susan Barbara Gyankorama Ofori-Atta, also de Graft-Johnson (1917 – July 1985) was a Ghanaian medical doctor who was the first female doctor on the Gold Coast. She was the first Ghanaian woman and fourth West African woman to earn a university degree. Ofori-Atta was also the fourth West African woman to become a physician after the Nigerians Agnes Yewande Savage (1929), Elizabeth Abimbola Awoliyi (1938) and Sierra Leone Creole, Irene Ighodaro (1944). In 1933, Sierra Leonean political activist and higher education pioneer, Edna Elliot-Horton became the second West African woman university graduate and the first to earn a bachelor's degree in the liberal arts. Eventually Ofori-Atta became a medical officer-in-charge at the Kumasi Hospital, and later, she assumed in charge of the Princess Louise Hospital for Women. Her contemporary was Matilda J. Clerk, the second Ghanaian woman and fifth West African woman to become a physician, who was also educated at Achimota and Edinburgh. Ofori-Atta was made an Honorary Doctor of Science by the University of Ghana for her work on malnutrition in children, and received the Royal Cross from Pope John Paul II when he visited Ghana in 1980, in recognition of her offering of free medical services at her clinic. She helped to establish the Women's Society for Public Affairs and was a Foundation Fellow of the Ghana Academy of Arts and Sciences. Her achievements were a symbol of inspiration to aspiring women physicians in Ghana.

== Early life and education ==
A member of the prominent Ofori-Atta royal dynasty, Susan Ofori-Atta was born in Kyebi, Gold Coast (present-day Ghana), in 1917 to Nana Sir Ofori Atta I, the Okyenhene and Paramount Chief of the Akyem Abuakwa Traditional Area, and his wife Nana Akosua Duodu.

Susan Ofori-Atta received her primary education at St. Mary's Convent in Elmina around 1921 and enrolled at Achimota School in 1929 for her secondary education. She was one of the pioneer students after the opening in 1927 of the college, where she was the Girls' School Prefect in her final year and sat for the Cambridge School Certificate. She studied midwifery at Korle-Bu Midwifery Training School, graduating in 1935, and she had further training in midwifery in Scotland. After her tertiary education, she practised midwifery at Korle-Bu Teaching Hospital. She further continued her education at Edinburgh University Medical School, where she obtained her MBChB degree in 1947. Her education abroad was sponsored by funds bequeathed to her by her wealthy father, Ofori Atta I, who died in 1943 while she was still a medical student at Edinburgh.

== Career and advocacy ==
Ofori-Atta began her career as a midwife and then studied to become a pediatrician, making her the first female doctor in the Gold Coast (now known as Ghana). In 1960, she volunteered her time at a Congolese hospital that was understaffed. During her time as a medical officer at the Princess Marie Louise Hospital, she was dubbed "mmofra doctor" (children's doctor). She left the Princess Marie Louise Hospital to join the University of Ghana Medical School, where she was a founding member of the Paediatrics Department before starting her own private medical practice for women and children at her clinic, the Accra Clinic. She was also a Diplomate of the Royal College of Obstetricians and Gynaecology (1949) and the Royal College of Paediatrics and Child Health (1958).

She was an advocate for women and children causes and opposed the Akan system of inheritance, advocating legislation to address the issue and give right to the spouses and children to inherit their deceased spouses and fathers who died intestate. Her efforts led to the PNDC Intestate Succession Law promulgated in 1985. She was a member of the 1969 Constituent Assembly which drafted the Constitution for the Second Republic of Ghana.

She was honoured by the University of Ghana in 1974 with an honorary Doctor of Science for her pioneering research work into childhood malnutrition — "Kwashiorkor", a term she coined that became a medical term in the global community. She was an active in the Catholic Church in Ghana, especially the Accra Diocese. She was an executive member of the Federation of Association of Catholic Medical Doctors and a member of the Ghana Catholic Doctors Association.

== Personal life and family ==
She was married to E. V. C. de Graft-Johnson, a barrister-at-law based in Accra and a cousin of Joseph W.S. de Graft-Johnson, vice-president of Ghana from 1979 to 1981. During the 1960s, E. V. C. de Graft Johnson held a one-man protest on a matter of legal principle outside the Supreme Court buildings. After the ban on multiparty democracy was lifted in 1969, E. V. C. de Graft-Johnson became the Leader and General Secretary of the now-defunct All People's Party. In 1979, E.V.C. de Graft-Johnson was the vice-chairman of the centre-left party, Social Democratic Front (SDF).

Susan Ofori-Atta's older brother was William Ofori-Atta, the Gold Coast politician and lawyer, former foreign minister and one of the founding leaders of the United Gold Coast Convention (UGCC) as well as a member of "The Big Six", the group of political activists detained by the British colonial government after the 1948 Accra riots, kicking off the struggle for the attainment of Ghana's independence in 1957. Her other brother was Kofi Asante Ofori-Atta, a Minister for Local Government in the Convention People's Party (CPP) government of Kwame Nkrumah and later Speaker of the Parliament of Ghana. Her younger sister was Adeline Akufo-Addo, the First Lady of Ghana during the Second Republic.

== Death and legacy ==
Susan Ofori-Atta died of natural causes in July 1985 in the United Kingdom. A girls' house at her alma mater, Achimota School, was named after her.

== See also ==
- Timeline of women in science
- Women in medicine
