= Jones Ofori Atta =

Ghanaian economist and politician (1937–2020)

Ministerial Secretary for Finance
- In office 1969–1972
- Appointed by: Kofi Busia
- Minister: Joseph Henry Mensah

Member of the Ghana Parliament for Begoro
- In office 1 October 1969 – 13 January 1972
- Preceded by: Parliament suspended
- Succeeded by: Parliament suspended

Personal details
- Born: Akwasi Andrews Jones Amoako Atta Ofori Atta; 7 December 1937 Fankyeneko, Gold Coast
- Died: 30 November 2020 (aged 82) Kyebi, Ghana
- Children: including Ken
- Parent: Ofori Atta I (father)
- Relatives: William Ofori Atta (brother); Kofi Asante Ofori-Atta (brother); Susan Ofori-Atta (sister); Adeline Akufo-Addo (sister); Kwesi Amoako-Atta (brother)
- Education: Achimota School; University of Ghana (B.A.); University of Ottawa (PhD)
- Occupation: Economist; Politician

Academic work
- Discipline: Economics
- Institutions: University of Ghana, Legon

Akwasi Andrews Jones Amoako Atta Ofori Atta (7 December 1937 – 30 November 2020) was a Ghanaian economist and politician. He was a senior lecturer in economics at the University of Ghana and served as ministerial secretary (deputy minister) for Finance and Economic Planning in the Busia government.

== Early life and education ==
Jones was born on 7 December 1937 at Fankyeneko in the Eastern region to Nana Sir Ofori Atta I; the Omanhene of Akyem Abuakwa between 1912 and 1943. He had his early education at the Kibi Government School from 1943 to 1950 and his secondary education at Achimota School from 1950 to 1957. He proceeded to the University of Ghana from 1958 to 1961. He left for Canada to study at the University of Ottawa in 1962. He was awarded his doctorate degree in 1965.

== Lectureship ==
He joined the faculty of the University of Manitoba, Winnipeg as an assistant professor in Economics from 1965 to 1966. He was also a visiting lecturer at the University of Manchester from 1966 to 1967. In 1967, he was appointed a lecturer in economics at the University of Ghana. In 1969 he left his teaching post at the university to contest for political office. He returned to the University of Ghana after the fall of the second republic and went on to become the Dean of the Faculty of Social Sciences.

== Politics ==
In 1969, he was elected a member of parliament for the Begoro constituency on the ticket of the Progress Party. He contested the seat with Edward R. Dampare of the National Alliance of Liberals and Prince Condua of the United Nationalist Party. That same year, he was appointed ministerial secretary (deputy minister) for the Ministry of Finance and Economic Planning by the then prime minister Kofi Abrefa Busia. He held this appointment until 1972 when the Busia government was overthrown by the National Redemption Council.

At the inception of the Third Republic, he was elected as a member of parliament for the Begoro constituency for a second time on the ticket of the Popular Front Party; an offshoot of the erstwhile Progress Party. While in parliament, he also served as the opposition spokesman on finance and economic planning. He served in these roles from 1979 until 1981 when the Limann government was overthrown.

In 1992, he stood for the seat of the Fanteakwa constituency on the ticket of the New Patriotic Party. He lost the seat to K. Amfo of the National Democratic Congress in a controversial contest in which results of the contest were disputed by the New Patriotic Party and the National Democratic Congress.

In 1996, he was one of the presidential aspirants for the New Patriotic Party. In 1997, he decided to quit active politics even though he remained a member of the New Patriotic Party.

== Personal life ==
He was married to Maud Adi-Darko, with whom he had four children. He was the father of Ken Ofori-Atta, the former Minister of Finance, a son he had away from his marriage. His hobbies were reading and writing.

== Death ==
Ofori-Atta died on 30 November 2020 at the age of 82.

== See also ==
- List of MPs elected in the 1969 Ghanaian parliamentary election
- Busia government
- Ofori-Atta
