= Dakoa Newman =

Ghanaian politician

Hon. Dakoa Newman MP
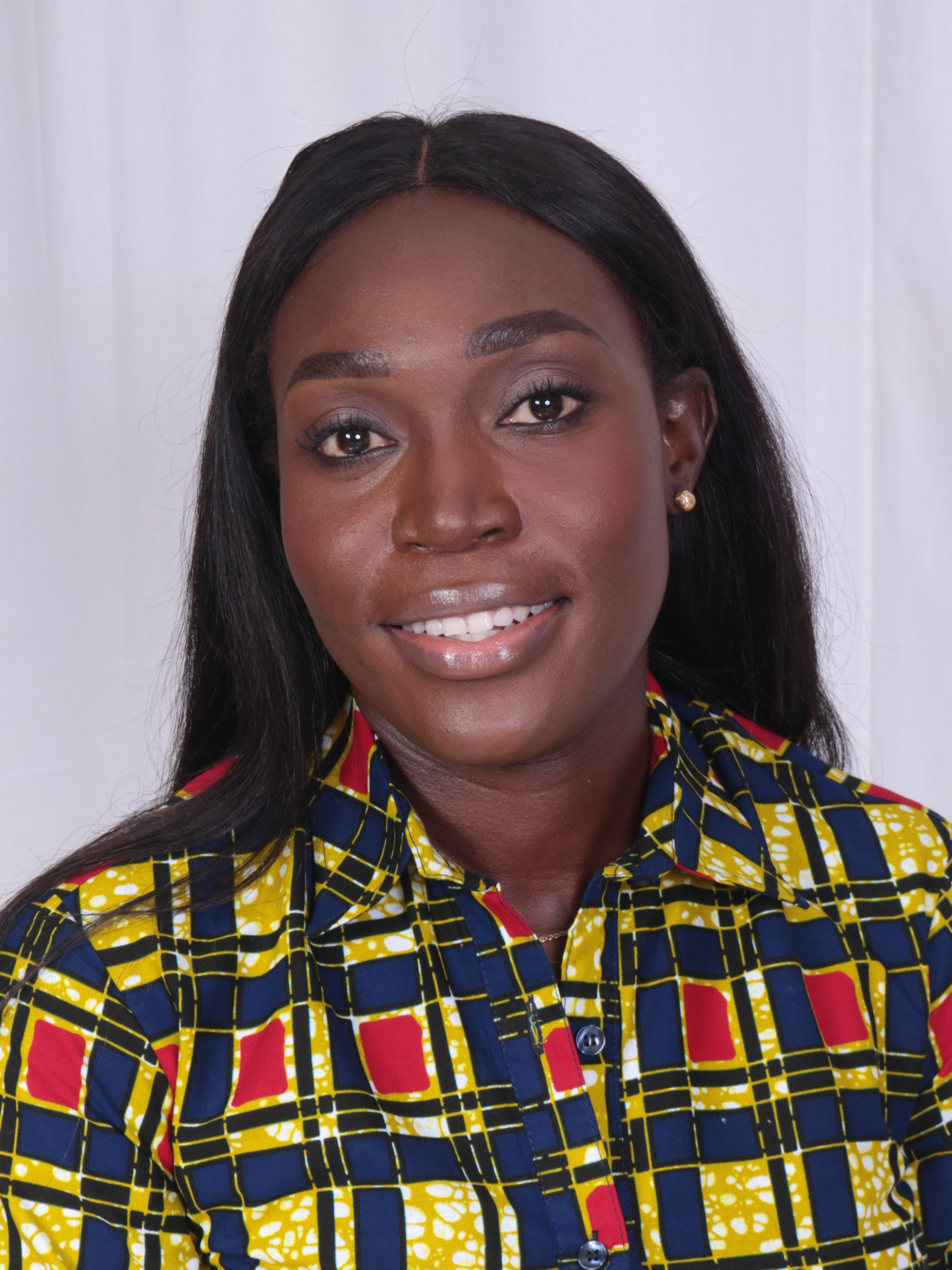

Former Member of Parliament for Okaikwei South Constituency
- Incumbent
- Assumed office 7 January 2021
- Minister: Gender, Children and Social Protection
- Preceded by: Arthur Ahmed

Personal details
- Born: 6 June 1985 (age 41)
- Party: New Patriotic Party
- Education: University of Ghana, Legon
- Profession: Project Manager

Dakoa Newman (born 6 June 1985) is a Ghanaian politician who is a member of the New Patriotic Party (NPP). She is the member of parliament for the Okaikwei South Constituency. She is the daughter of Victor Newman who was also a politician and founding member of the New Patriotic Party. She is the Minister for Gender, Children and Social Protection.

== Early life and education ==
She was born on 6 June 1985 into a Christian family and hails from Akropong and Osu. She completed Wesley Girls Senior High School, Cape Coast. She is a chartered Project Management Professional (PMP)and a chartered Risk Management Professional (RMP) certified by the Project Management Institute, USA(2017. She also holds a Bachelor's Degree in Political Science from the University of Ghana, Legon and a Master’s Degree in Program and Project Management from the University of Warwick, United Kingdom.

== Politics ==
In June 2020, she stood for the New Patriotic Party primaries for Okaikwei South. Newman defeated incumbent member of parliament Arthur Ahmed and Nana Fredua by getting 440 votes, whilst the two others got 327 votes and 27 votes respectively.

She won the 2020 December parliamentary elections for the Okaikwei South Constituency. She obtained 40,393 votes, representing 60.82% against her closest contender Abraham Kotei Neequaye of the National Democratic Congress (NDC) who had 26,019 votes representing 39.18%.

In 2024 General Elections Darkoa Newman stood again for the Okaikwei South Constituency against Ernest Adomako, however, she lost after receiving 24,263 votes whiles her opponent obtained 32,691 votes to win the elections.

== Personal life ==
She is the daughter of Ghanaian politician Victor Newman. Darkoa is married with a child. She is a christian.
