= Asafo-Akyem =

Coordinates: 6.182°N 0.466°W

Asafo-Akyem is a town in the Eastern Region of Ghana. The town was the initial place where Abuakwa State College was established before it was moved to its permanent place in Kibi.
