= Kingsley Agyemang =

Ghanaian politician

Member of the 9th Parliament for Akim Abuakwa South (Ghana parliament constituency)
- Incumbent
- Assumed office January 7, 2025
- Preceded by: Samuel Atta Akyea

Personal details
- Born: November 24, 1979 (age 46) Asiakwa Ghana
- Party: New Patriotic Party
- Education: University of Ghana; Central University (Ghana); Brunel University of London
- Occupation: Politician, chartered insurer, lecturer, administrator

Kingsley Agyemang (born November 24, 1979) is a Ghanaian administrator, chartered Insurer, and member of the New Patriotic Party (NPP). He is the member of Parliament for Akim Abuakwa South (Ghana parliament constituency) in the Eastern Region. He represents the constituency in the Ninth Parliament of the Fourth Republic of Ghana as a member of the New Patriotic Party.

He was appointed registrar of the Ghana Scholarship Secretariat under the second term of Nana Akufo-Addo.

== Early life and education ==
He was born in Asiakwa in the Eastern Region of Ghana. He attended the University of Ghana, Legon and graduated with a Bachelor of Science degree in Administration in 2004. He proceeded to the Central University (Ghana) and obtained an MBA in 2012 and later in 2022, he was awarded a PHD from Brunel University of London.

== Career ==
In the 2024 Ghanaian general election, he won the Akim Abuakwa South (Ghana parliament constituency) elections, polling 27,011 votes against his contender Nana Addo Sarong Aikins of the National Democratic Congress (Ghana) who polled 7,454 votes.

== Scholarship Secretariat ==
Kingsley Agyemang was the registrar of the Ghana Scholarship Secretariat under the second term of Nana Akuffo-Addo. He was later accused of scholarship during his tenure as the registrar and was invited by the Bureau of National Intelligence to assist investigation.
