= Ahumkan Festival =

Festival in Ghana by the people of Kibi

Ahumkan Festival is an annual festival celebrated by the chiefs and people of Kibi in the Eastern Region of Ghana. It is usually celebrated in the month of June.

== Celebrations ==
During the festival, visitors are welcomed to share food and drinks. The people put on traditional clothes and there is durbar of chiefs. There is also dancing and drumming.

== Significance ==
This festival is celebrated to mark an event that took place in the past. The local people affirm their loyalty to their chieftains.
