= Nana Ofori Atta II =

King of Akyem Abuakwa (1899–1973)

Nana Ofori Atta II was the paramount king of Akyem Abuakwa. He lived from 1899 to 1973. He succeeded Nana Sir Ofori Atta I. He was also the successor who was once a member of the Executive Council.
