= Martin Appiah-Danquah =

Ghanaian politician

Personal details
- Born: September 21, 1924 Nkawie, Ashanti Region
- Died: 1996
- Party: Convention Peoples Party
- Spouse: Sophia Appiah-Danquah
- Education: Akim Abuakwa State College
- Occupation: Politician
- Profession: Farmer

Martin Appiah-Danquah was a Ghanaian politician and farmer.

== Personal life and education ==
Appiah-Danquah was born on 21 September 1924. He hailed from Nkawie in the Atwima Mponua District in the Ashanti Region of Ghana. He had his basic education at the English Church Mission School in Nkawie. In 1940, he furthered his education at the Akim Abuakwa State College in Kibi in the Eastern Region of Ghana.

He was married to Sophia Appiah-Danquah. Martin Appiah-Danquah died on 6 June 1996.

== Career ==
In January 1954, Appiah-Danquah was appointed the Secretary-General of the United Ghana Farmers' Council Co-operatives till 1966. In 1961, he was also the Ambassador Extraordinary and Minister Plenipotentiary. He was also the Chairman of the National Cooperative Council.

== Politics ==
Appiah-Danquah was a member of the Convention Peoples Party (CPP).

== Controversy ==
In May 1969, Appiah-Danquah was among 21 former CPP members accused of unlawfully amassing a wealth of 96,647.20 cedi and his houses were seized by the Government of Ghana.
