= Kofi Asante Ofori-Atta =

Politician and Former Speaker of the Parliament of Ghana

The Right Honourable Aaron Eugene Kofi Asante Ofori-Atta MP

4th Speaker of the Parliament of Ghana
- In office 10 June 1965 – 24 February 1966
- President: Kwame Nkrumah
- Preceded by: Joseph Richard Asiedu
- Succeeded by: Parliament suspended

Member of the Ghana Parliament for Begoro
- In office February 1965 – 10 June 1965
- Preceded by: New
- Succeeded by: Jones Ofori Atta

Minister for Justice
- In office September 1961 – 1965
- Preceded by: Himself (Minister for Local Government and Justice)
- Succeeded by: Ministry merged B. E. Kwaw-Swanzy (Attorney General and Minister for Justice)

Minister for Local Government and Justice
- In office 1958 – September 1961
- Preceded by: Himself (Minister for Local Government); Ebenezer Ako-Adjei (Minister for Justice)
- Succeeded by: Kwaku Boateng (Minister for Local Government)

Minister for Local Government
- In office 1956–1958
- Preceded by: Edward Asafu-Adjaye
- Succeeded by: Ministry merged Himself (Minister for Local Government and Justice)

Minister for Communications
- In office 1954–1956
- Preceded by: Position established
- Succeeded by: Archie Casely-Hayford

Member of the Ghana Parliament for Abuakwa Central
- In office 1954 – February 1965
- Preceded by: J. B. Danquah
- Succeeded by: Constituency abolished

Personal details
- Born: 12 December 1912 Kibi, Gold Coast
- Died: July 1978 (aged 65) Accra, Ghana
- Other political affiliations: Convention People's Party
- Parents: Ofori Atta I; Agnes Akosua Dodua
- Relatives: William Ofori-Atta (brother); Susan Ofori-Atta (sister); Adeline Akufo-Addo (sister); Kwesi Amoako-Atta (brother); Jones Ofori Atta (brother)
- Occupation: Educator; Lawyer

Aaron Eugene Kofi Asante Ofori-Atta, MP (12 December 1912 – July 1978) was a Ghanaian educator, lawyer and politician who served as the fourth Speaker of the Parliament of Ghana.

== Early life and education ==
He was born on 12 December 1912 at Kyebi, Akyem Abuakwa and was a member of the Ofori-Atta royal family. After attending Presbyterian elementary school, he entered Mfantsipim School in 1925 and in 1928, was one of the students moved to Achimota College where he completed his secondary education in 1933. He served in various capacities at the Abuakwa State College and was made the school's Vice Principal and later Principal from 1944 to 1947. Later in 1947, he left for Ireland and entered Trinity College Dublin where he obtained his B.A degree in law and a diploma in public administration.

== Career ==
Ofori-Atta was elected MP for Abuakwa Central and Begoro Constituencies. He first entered parliament house in 1954 and was appointed Minister for Communication from 1954 to 1956. He beat a relative, J. B. Danquah, member of the Ghana Congress Party and a founding member of the defunct United Gold Coast Convention to the Akim Abuakwa Central seat. He was a Minister for Local Government in the Convention People's Party (CPP) government of Kwame Nkrumah in the first government of Ghana. He also served as the Minister for Justice in the same government.

He was later appointed Speaker of Parliament on 10 June 1965 in the First Republic of Ghana. He remained speaker until parliament was suspended by the National Liberation Council, formed after the coup d'état that ended the First Republic. Ofori-Atta is the uncle of Nana Akufo-Addo, President of Ghana.

== Death ==
Ofori-Atta died at the 37 Military Hospital in July 1978 in Accra.

Political offices
Preceded by First	Minister for Local Government; 1957 – 65	Succeeded by Mumuni Bawumia
Preceded by Geoffrey Bing	Minister for Justice; 1962 – 62	Succeeded by George Commey Mills-Odoi
Preceded by First	Minister for Communication; 1954 – 56	Succeeded by Archie Casely-Hayford
Preceded by Joseph Richard Asiedu	Speaker of the Parliament of Ghana; 1965 – 66	Succeeded by Nii Amaa Ollennu (1969 – 72)
