= Osagyefo Kuntunkununku II =

Former King of the Akyem Abuakwa State

Kuntunkununku II
- Okyenhene

King of Akyem Abuakwa
- Reign: 1976 -1999
- Coronation: 1976
- Predecessor: Ofori-Atta III
- Successor: Amoatia Ofori-Panin II
- Born: Alex Fredua Agyeman; 24 February 1942; Kyebi
- Died: 17 March 1999 (aged 57); 37 Military Hospital, Accra
- Burial: 16 August 1999; Kyebi
- House: Ofori-Panin

Nana Kuntunkununku II (born Alexander Kwadwo Fredua Agyeman 22 February 1942 – 17 March 1999) was a traditional ruler in Ghana and the 34th King of Akyem Abuakwa in the Eastern Region. His official title was Okyenhene. He succeeded his uncle, Ofori Atta III, and ruled the Akyems for 23 years. He was succeeded by Amoatia Ofori Panin II. He was the 7th President of the National House of Chiefs and served from 1998 till his death in 1999.

== Early life ==
Alex Fredua Agyeman was born on 22 February 1942, at Kyebi to Samuel Joseph Okoampa Agyeman and Juliana Abena Akoto

In 1957, he entered Prempeh College and obtained his GCE Ordinary level Certificate in 1961. He was a member of the pioneering sixth form class of the Accra Academy between 1961 and 1962. His training as a medical doctor begun at the Sofia University in Bulgaria and was continued at the Charles University in Prague, Czechoslovakia where he graduated in 1970.

== Career ==
In 1972, he practiced medicine at the Korle-Bu Hospital on his return to Ghana. In 1974, he joined the Ridge Hospital in Accra. He worked as well in the Castle Clinic and was medical officer in charge of the Stadium Clinic in Accra.

In 1976, he was selected as King of Akyem Abuakwa. He was installed on August 2, 1976, as the 34th occupant of the Ofori Panin Stool at the age of 34. As chief, he tried to encourage investors, mostly foreign, to start businesses on Akyem lands and in Ghana, travelling and having meetings in western European nations.

Between 1994 and 1998 he served two terms as president of the Eastern regional House of Chiefs. He served as the chairman of the lands committee of the national house of chiefs. He served as representative of the Eastern regional House of chiefs to the Constituent Assembly which drafted the Ghanaian constitution in 1992. He was a member of the Eastern regional coordinating Council. In 1998 he was elected president of the National House of Chiefs and became a member of the council of state.

== Personal life ==
He had 6 children from 3 marriages.

== Death ==
He died on Wednesday, March 17 at dawn after a short illness at 37 Military Hospital.

== Legacies ==
During his reign, there was an increase in the number of educational institutions in the Akyem Abukwa Traditional area. He also established some second-cycle schools in the Atiwa Constituency. Abuakwa Constituency also had some second-cycle schools established there.

He also established gold mines in the traditional area his reign.

He also listened to complains of the people in some surrounding villages about the environmental problem caused by some gold mines. Surface gold mining led to the pollution of water bodies in those areas.

He also elevated a number of Odikros or Care takers to paramountcy.
