= Nana Akomea =

Ghanaian politician (born 1961)

Honourable Nana Akomea

Member of the Ghana Parliament for Okaikwei South
- In office 7 January 1997 – 6 January 2013
- Preceded by: Samuel Wise Quarcoo
- Succeeded by: Arthur Ahmed

Minister for Information
- In office 2003–2005
- President: John Kufuor
- Vice President: Aliu Mahama
- Preceded by: Jake Obetsebi Lamptey
- Succeeded by: Dan Botwe
- Majority: New Patriotic Party

Ministry for Manpower, Youth and Employment
- In office 2007 – 6 January 2009
- President: John Kufuor
- Preceded by: Abubakar Boniface Siddique
- Succeeded by: Stephen Amoanor Kwao

Personal details
- Born: 5 August 1961 (age 64)
- Party: New Patriotic Party
- Children: 2
- Profession: Journalist/Advertiser (Communication Expert)

Nana Akomea (born 5 August 1961) is a Ghanaian politician who has served as the Member of Parliament for Okaikwei South from 1997 to 2013, representing the New Patriotic Party.

== Early life and education ==
Akomea was born on 5 August 1961. He hails from Nsutam in the Fanteakwa District in the Eastern region of Ghana. He completed his secondary education at the Ghana Secondary Technical School(Takoradi). In 1991, Akomea obtained a Post Graduate Degree in Communication Studies from the University of Ghana.

== Career ==
Akomea is a Journalist and Advertiser and communication expert. He worked at Focal Point Advertising Company before he became an MP.

== Politics ==
Akomea was the Director of Communications for the New Patriotic Party. He held this position since 31 January 2011 after the resignation of Kwaku Kwarteng, the previous director. In the political space, he has been the minister of information (2003-2005), and the Minister for Manpower Development and Employment (2007-2009).

In 2017, he was appointed by the then President, Nana Akufo-Addo to head the State Transport Corporation (STC).

On February 11, 2025, he resigned as the managing director of STC following President John Mahama second term in office.

== Elections ==
Akomea was elected as the Member of Parliament for the Okaikwei South constituency in the 5th parliament of the 4th republic of Ghana. He was elected with 35,438votes out of the 64,916 total valid votes cast, equivalent to 54.6% of total valid votes. He was elected over Isaac Mensah of the National Democratic Congress, William Aryee of the Democratic Freedom Party and Anthony Mensah of the Convention People's Party. These obtained 39.77%, 0.36% and 5.28% respectively of total valid votes cast.

=== 1996 Elections ===
Akomea contested his constituency on the ticket of the New Patriotic Party in the 1996 Ghanaian General Elections. He defeated Agbemor Yeboah Ernest of the National Democratic Congress by obtaining 44.70% of the total votes cast which is equivalent to 35,284 votes whilst his counterpart obtained 29.00% of the total votes cast which is 22,928 votes in equivalence.

== Personal life ==
He is Christian (Presbyterian) with two children. He married his longtime girlfriend Eno Akua Awuah-Kyerematen on Friday, December 21, 2019 in Accra.
