= Arthur Ahmed =

Ghanaian politician

Member of the Ghana Parliament for Okaikwei South Constituency
- In office 7 January 2013 – 7 January 2017
- Preceded by: Nana Akomea
- Succeeded by: Dakoa Newman

Personal details
- Born: March 30, 1970 (age 56)
- Party: New Patriotic Party
- Children: 3
- Education: Accra Academy; Abuakwa State College

Arthur Ahmed is a Ghanaian politician who was Member of Parliament for Okaikwei South Constituency in the Greater Accra Region from 2013 to 2017 on the ticket of the New Patriotic Party.

== Early life and education ==
He comes from Nsuta Mampong in the Ashanti Region. Arthur received his Ordinary level certificate from Accra Academy and his GCE Advanced Level certificate from Abuakwa State College.

== Employment ==
He is the managing director of Ackwell Entreprise and contracts works.

== Politics ==
He was elected Member of Parliament for Okaikwei South Constituency from 2013 and was re-elected in 2016.

== Marital status ==
He is married with three children.

== Religion ==
He is a Christian.
