= Nana Akufo-Addo =

President of Ghana from 2017 to 2025

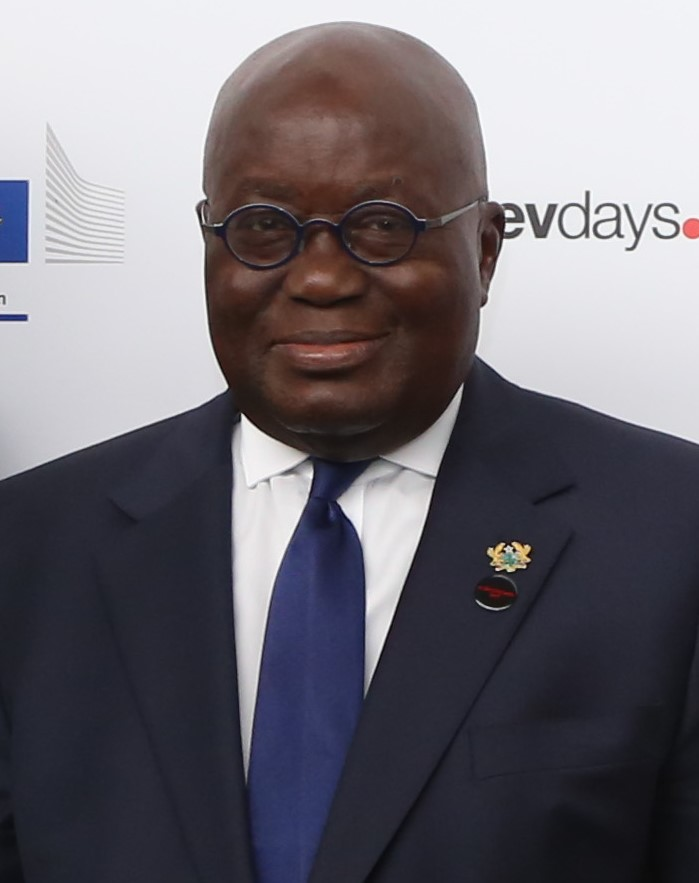
- Akufo-Addo in 2017

13th President of Ghana
- In office 7 January 2017 – 7 January 2025
- Vice President: Mahamudu Bawumia
- Preceded by: John Mahama
- Succeeded by: John Mahama
Ministerial offices
Minister of Foreign Affairs
In office 1 April 2003 – 1 July 2007
| President | John Kufuor |
| Preceded by | Hackman Owusu-Agyeman |
| Succeeded by | Akwasi Osei-Adjei |
Attorney General of Ghana
In office 7 January 2001 – 1 April 2003
| President | John Kufuor |
| Preceded by | Obed Asamoah |
| Succeeded by | Papa Owusu-Ankomah |
Parliamentary offices
Member of Parliament for Akim Abuakwa South
In office 7 January 2005 – 6 January 2009
| Preceded by | Constituency established |
| Succeeded by | Samuel Atta Akyea |
Member of Parliament for Abuakwa
In office 7 January 1997 – 6 January 2005
| Preceded by | Constituency established |
| Succeeded by | Constituency abolished |

35th Chair of Economic Community of West African States
- In office 2 June 2020 – 3 July 2022
- Preceded by: Mahamadou Issoufou
- Succeeded by: Umaro Sissoco Embaló

Personal details
- Born: William Addo Dankwa Akufo-Addo; 29 March 1944 (age 82) Accra, Gold Coast (now Ghana)
- Party: New Patriotic Party
- Spouses: Eleanor Nkansah-Gyamenah (deceased) Rebecca Griffiths-Randolph (m. 1997)
- Children: 5
- Parents: Edward Akufo-Addo; Adeline Akufo-Addo
- Education: University of Ghana (BSc)
- Website: Campaign website

Nana Addo Dankwa Akufo-Addo (/æˈkʊfoʊ ɑːˈdoʊ/ a-KUUF-oh ah-DOH; born 29 March 1944) is a Ghanaian politician who served as the 13th president of Ghana from January 2017 to January 2025. He previously served as Attorney General from 2001 to 2003 and as Minister for Foreign Affairs from 2003 to 2007 under the administration of then-president John Kufuor.

Akufo-Addo first ran for president in the year 2008 and again in 2012, both times as the presidential candidate of the New Patriotic Party (NPP). He lost on both occasions to National Democratic Congress' candidates: John Evans Atta Mills in 2008 and John Dramani Mahama in 2012. After the 2012 general elections, he refused to concede and proceeded to court to challenge the electoral results, but the Supreme Court of Ghana affirmed Mahama's victory.

He was chosen as the presidential candidate of the New Patriotic Party for a third time for the 2016 general elections, and this time he defeated incumbent John Dramani Mahama in the first round, winning with 53.85% of the votes. This marked the first time in a Ghanaian presidential history that an opposition candidate won an outright majority in the first round. It was the first time that an opposition candidate had unseated an incumbent president. Akuffo-Addo again secured an outright majority in the first round of the 2020 general elections (winning with 51.59% of the vote), defeating Mahama for a second time.

Akufo-Addo's government initially drew broad popularity from the Ghanaian public, promoting a nationalistic "Ghana Beyond Aid" agenda. The latter part of his tenure, however, was marked with the worst financial crises in Ghana in a generation, with inflation reaching up to 40% in both 2022 and 2023. His government attributed this to the COVID-19 pandemic and Russian invasion of Ukraine, but many observers pointed to mismanagement of public funds. Because he was term-limited, he peacefully handed over power to the NDC's Mahama on 7 January 2025 after the incumbent NPP lost power amid the unpopularity of his administration.

== Early life and education ==
Nana Addo Dankwa Akufo-Addo was born in Accra, Ghana, on March 29, 1944, to Adeline Ofori-Atta and Edward Akufo-Addo. His father, Edward Akufo-Addo, from Akropong-Akuapem was Ghana's third Chief Justice from 1966 to 1970, chairman of the 1967–68 Constitutional Commission and the non-executive president of Ghana from 1970 till 1972. Akufo-Addo's maternal grandfather was Nana Sir Ofori Atta, King of Akyem Abuakwa, who was a member of the Executive Council of the Gold Coast before Ghana's independence. He is a nephew of ex-Speaker of Parliament Kofi Asante Ofori-Atta and the Big Six member William Ofori Atta. J. B. Danquah, another member of The Big Six, was a granduncle of his.

He started his primary education at the Government Boys School and Rowe Road School (now Kinbu), both in Accra Central. He went to England and continued his education at Holmewood House Preparatory School before studying for his O-Level and A-Level examinations at Lancing College, Sussex, where he was nicknamed "Billy" and joined the Anglican faith. He began the Philosophy, Politics and Economics course at New College, Oxford, in 1962, but left soon afterwards. He returned to Ghana in 1962 to teach at the Accra Academy, before going to read economics at the University of Ghana, Legon, in 1964, earning a BSc (Econ) degree in 1967. He subsequently joined the Middle Temple and trained as a lawyer under the apprenticeship system known as the Inns of Court, where no formal law degree was required. He was called to the English Bar (Middle Temple) in July 1971. He was called to the Ghanaian bar in July 1975. Akufo-Addo worked with the Paris office of the U.S. law firm Coudert Brothers. In 1979, he co-founded the law firm Akufo-Addo, Prempeh and Co.

== Political career ==
Though known by his friends to have been a vocal supporter of the Convention People's Party (CPP) while a student in the University of Ghana, he switched sides to the rival United Party (UP) tradition following the overthrow of President Kwame Nkrumah in 1966 after which his father, Edward Akufo-Addo became ceremonial president of Ghana in 1969. Akufo-Addo's participation in politics formally began in the late 1970s when he joined the People's Movement for Freedom and Justice (PMFJ), an organization formed to oppose the General Acheampong-led Supreme Military Council's Union Government proposals. In May 1995, he was among a broad group of elites who formed Alliance for Change, an alliance that organized demonstrations against Neo-liberal policies such as the introduction of Value Added Tax and human rights violations of the Rawlings presidency. At the forefront of this demonstration were himself, Abdul Malik, Kwaku Baako and Saifullah Senior minister Victor Newman, Kwasi Pratt Jnr, Dr. Charles Wereko Brobbey among others. They were joined by about 100,000 other people. The protest was named "Kume Preko". As an elite, Akufo-Addo vied for leadership positions; the broad-based opposition alliance eventually fell apart. In the 1990s, he formed a civil rights organization called Ghana's Committee on Human and People's Rights.

He was a member of the 2nd, 3rd and 4th parliament of the 4th republic representing the Abuakwa constituency.

In the 1996 elections, he polled 28,526 votes out of the 50,263 valid votes cast representing 56.75% over Owuraku Amofah who polled 20,173 votes, Adoo-Aikins who polled 705 votes, Ahmadu Rufai who polled 682 votes and Emmanuel Kofi Tamakloe who polled 177 votes. He won again in the 2000 General Elections with 28,633 votes out of the 45,795 valid votes cast representing 62.50% over Christiana Annor who polled 14,486 votes, Addo-Aikins who polled 1,088 votes, Theresa Stella Amakye who polled 593 votes, Kofi Opoku-Gyamera who polled 519 votes and Isaac Duodu Awah who also polled 506 votes.

=== Presidential bids ===
In October 1998, Akufo-Addo competed for the a presidential run of the NPP and lost to John Kufuor, who subsequently won the December 2000 presidential election and assumed office as President of Ghana in January 2001. Akufo-Addo was the chief campaigner for Kufuor in the 2000 election. He became the first attorney general and Minister for justice of the Kufuor era, and later moved to the Ministry of Foreign Affairs and New Partnership for Africa's Development (NEPAD).

In 2007, he was the popular candidate tipped to win the New Patriotic Party's presidential primaries. In 2008, Akufo-Addo represented the NPP in a closely contested election against John Atta Mills of NDC. In the first round of voting, Akufo-Addo tallied 49.13%, leading Atta Mills with a slim margin that was below the constitutional threshold of 50% to become the outright winner.

Akufo-Addo ran again as the NPP's presidential candidate in the 2012 national elections against NDC's John Mahama, successor to the late Atta Mills. Mahama was declared the winner of the election, an outcome that was legally challenged by Akufo-Addo. The court case generated considerable controversy, and was finally decided by the Ghana Supreme Court in a narrow 5/4 decision in favour of Mahama. Akufo-Addo accepted the verdict in the interest of economic stability and international goodwill.

In March 2014, Akufo-Addo announced his decision to seek his party's nomination for the third time ahead of the 2016 election. In the NPP primary conducted in October 2014, he was declared victor with 94.35% of the votes. Akufo-Addo also served as chair of the Commonwealth Observer Mission for the South African elections in 2014.

He focused his campaign on the economy, promising to stabilize the country's foreign exchange rate and to reduce unemployment levels. On 9 December 2016, sitting president Mahama conceded defeat to Akufo-Addo. Akufo-Addo won the election with 53.83% of the votes against Mahama's 44.4%.

Akufo-Addo announced his intention to run for re-election by picking a nomination form as flagbearer of the New Patriotic Party ahead of the 2020 general elections. On 9 December 2020, Akufo-Addo was declared the winner of the 7 December election after securing a majority of 51.59% of the vote, just enough to win re-election in a single round. In December 2021, Akufo-Addo pledged to respect the two-term limit mandated in the Ghanaian constitution and not run for a third term in 2024.

== President of Ghana (2017–2025) ==
=== Inauguration ===
Akufo-Addo took office on 7 January 2017. His inauguration was held at Black Star Square in Accra. Twelve presidents from African and European countries attended the ceremony, including Edgar Lungu of Zambia, Abdel Fattah el-Sisi of Egypt, Ernest Bai Koroma of Sierra Leone, Robert Mugabe of Zimbabwe, Muhammadu Buhari of Nigeria.

Akufo-Addo faced backlash, especially on social media, for plagiarizing parts of his inauguration speech, having lifted passages, word-for-word, from previous inaugural addresses given by American presidents John F. Kennedy, Bill Clinton and George W. Bush as well as prepared remarks given by Nigerian President Muhammadu Buhari at a 2015 United States Institute of Peace event. After the scandal came to light, his press office issued an apology, with his communication director describing the situation as a "complete oversight and never deliberate." However, after the mea culpa, it was found that Akufo-Addo had also plagiarized portions of his 2013 concession speech after the Supreme Court of Ghana upheld the 2012 electoral victory of President John Mahama. In that speech, lines were lifted verbatim from United States Vice-president Al Gore's 2000 presidential concession speech given after the US Supreme Court verdict.

=== Education sector ===
In September 2017, Akufo-Addo launched the Free Senior High School (SHS) policy, which will make secondary high school free for students in Ghana. The president states it is a "necessary investment in the nation's future workforce" and will help parents who are unable to pay for their children's education due to financial hardships. The program met with positive reaction from the nation, parents and students were excited and fervent, but private schools opposed to the program state it will decrease the number of students enrolling in their system.

In August 2023, Akufo-Addo cited the 2022 WASSCE success as proof of his education policies' effectiveness. During a speech at Queen Girls Senior High School in the Western North region, the President credited last year's WASSCE results, the best in eight years, to the success of the Free Senior High School program and related initiatives. Akufo-Addo celebrated notable improvements in the 2022 WASSCE results, with higher scores in English, Integrated Science, Mathematics, and Social Studies. He also commended the 2021 student cohort for adapting to the double track system.

=== Economy ===
In 2018, the president introduced the 7-year Co-ordinated Programme of Economic and Social Development Policies which is expected to create jobs for the country. According to the president, the policies are founded on "five pillars of growth and development, namely revitalizing the economy; transform agriculture and industry; revamping economic and social infrastructure; strengthening social protection and inclusion; and reforming delivery system of public services institutions. Despite the IMF already warning the country that it was at high risk of debt-distress, the government of Akufo-Addo kept on borrowing, pushing up the nation's public debt from 56% of GDP to 63% before the pandemic. After the pandemic, Ghana borrowed even more in comparison with its neighbours, precipitating a budget-deficit crisis, the second highest in Sub Saharan Africa at 16% as of 2020, far above the regional average of 6%.

=== LGBT rights ===
Akufo-Addo has taken a relatively moderate line on LGBT rights in Ghana. In November 2017, he suggested that the legalisation of homosexuality is inevitable and said he can foresee a change in the law. Akufo-Addo, who spent much of his early life in England, said that LGBT rights will evolve in Ghana as they have in the United Kingdom. However, he affirmed that LGBT rights were not part of the government agenda at the moment. In August 2018, he reiterated that the Government of Ghana would not legalise same-sex marriage or decriminalise homosexuality under his leadership.

=== Sports ===
In February 2019, Akufo-Addo's administration announced a complete renovation of sports buildings around Ghana due to the country hosting the African Games in 2024. Buildings include Accra and Cape Coast Sports Stadium and the Azumah Nelson Sports Complex in Kaneshie. The University of Ghana Sports Stadium whose renovations were abandoned in 2009 after former President John Kufuor left office will also proceed.

=== Other ventures ===
In 2019, the number of regions in Ghana increased from ten to sixteen under the president's administration. The new regions are Oti, Western North, North East, Ahafo (splitting from Brong), Savannah and Bono East Regions. The creation of the regions ends decades of petitions to the government calling for the development of new regions.

In 2020, he signed the UNAIDS Public Letter on People's Vaccine which was a campaign calling for accessibility of the COVID-19 vaccine to all. He joined other world leaders in the signing. He wrote "all people everywhere must have access to the vaccine when one becomes available." Concerns were raised that people in richer countries may have quicker access to the vaccine than poor countries which led to the writing of an open letter that any vaccine against the disease should be free and made available at no cost to all people. In February 2021, Ghana became the first African country to receive COVID-19 vaccines through the World Health Organization's COVAX program. The shipment consisted of 600,000 doses of the AstraZeneca vaccines.

In May 2020, he swore into office two appointed Supreme Court Judges, Issifu Omoro Tanko Amadu and Clemence Jackson Honyenuga at the Jubilee House.

== Personal life ==
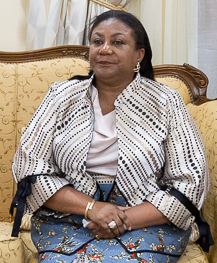
Akufo-Addo's third and current wife, Rebecca Akufo-Addo

Akufo-Addo is from Akropong-Akuapem and Kyebi in the Eastern Region and both sides of his family are Presbyterian. He is married to Rebecca Akufo-Addo (née Griffiths-Randolph), the daughter of judge Jacob Hackenburg Griffiths-Randolph, the Speaker of the Parliament of Ghana during the Third Republic. , He was married to Eleanor Nkansah-Gyamenah,which the marriage ended on her death in 1993.

Akufo-Addo has four biological daughters and one stepdaughter: Gyankroma, Edwina, Adriana, Yeboakua and Valerie. Virginia Hesse is the mother of one of his daughters. She was appointed by Akufo-Addo as Ghana's Ambassador to the Czech Republic in his first term. His first marriage to Remi bore him two of his daughters and his second marriage to Eleanor bore him a daughter. His marriage to Rebecca provided him a step-daughter had by Rebecca in a previous relationship. Akufo-Addo has a sister called Madam Marigold with the title, Abrewatia Nana Abena Oye.

Akufo-Addo is a teetotaller. An avid football fan, he is a supporter of Asante Kotoko, Real Madrid, and Tottenham Hotspur.

== Honours ==
=== Awards ===
Akufo-Addo was presented with the Mother Teresa Memorial International Award for Social Justice in 2016 by the Harmony Foundation for sacrificing political ambitions for the sake of national peace and reconciliation.

In May 2016, Akufo-Addo was bestowed Honorary Doctor of Law Degree from Fort Hare University of South Africa, recognizing his legal and political leadership.

In 2017, he received the National Achievement Award by the Africa-America Institute's on behalf of the people of Ghana. The award was given to recognise Ghana as a country that represents freedom, democracy and stability in Africa.

Almost a year into his Presidency in December 2017, Akufo-Addo received an honorary Doctor of Humane Letters degree from the University of Liberia.

Akufo-Addo was given an award for Exemplary Leadership in June 2018, by the Whitaker Group. In August 2018 he received the African Port Award by The African Port Award (APA) Foundation for his projects on modernizing Ghana's ports. In September 2018, the U.S. Africa Business Centre of the United States Chamber of Commerce presented Akufo-Addo with the 2018 Outstanding Leader's Award in recognition of regional, diplomatic, and economic leadership in Africa. In October 2018, he received the 2018 Governance Leadership Award "in recognition of his commitment towards enhancing the living standards of the Ghanaians and governing the country in accordance with the rule of law".

In May 2019, the United Nations Secretary-General António Guterres named Akufo-Addo among the newly appointed SDG advocates as co-chair alongside the prime minister of Norway, Erna Solberg. The role of these advocates is to raise awareness, inspire greater ambition, and push for faster action on the Sustainable Development Goals (SDGs).

In June 2019, the Association of National Olympic Committees of Africa (ANOCA) announced it will honour Akufo-Addo with the Association of National Olympic Committees of Africa (ANOCA) Merit Award for Heads of State due to his tremendous contribution to sports development and projects in Ghana and for the successful bid for Ghana to host the 2023 African Games.

Nana Akufo-Addo was honoured at the fourth Ghana Hotels Association Awards, held on 20 January 2020, for demonstrating visionary leadership by declaring the year of return and ensuring its successful execution.

In May 2021, at a Congregation held in his honour, the University of Cape Coast conferred honorary Doctor of Philosophy in Educational Leadership degree on Akufo-Addo. The honorary degree, which is the highest honour given by the University, recognised his contribution to education in the country.

On 10 October 2022, the University of Sorbonne in Paris, France presented an honorary doctorate degree to Akufo-Addo. Sorbonne recognized his commitment to democracy in Ghana, peace in West Africa, and his leadership in implementing the Free SHS policy and combating COVID-19.

On 8 August 2023, Akufo-Addo was presented with a Medal of Merit in Leadership Award by the African Bar Association.

In July 2024, Akufo-Addo received two honorary Doctorate degrees from two Universities in Ghana. On 14 July, Valley View University conferred honorary Doctorate on Akufo-Addo for his contribution to education and socio-economic development in Ghana and the sub-region as well as his unwavering desire to build an educated populace in the country. A fortnight later, the University of Health and Allied Sciences also honored Akufo-Addo with a Doctorate degree for his commitment to infrastructure development of the University and for the advancement of Science Education in the country.

On 6 November 2024, a statue was unveiled in his honour at the Effia-Nkwanta Regional Hospital in the Western Region, for the initiatives he has embarked on in the region during his term of office as indicated by the Western Regional Minister, Kwabena Okyere Darko.

In April 2026, Akufo-Addo was honoured by Otumfuo Osei Tutu II at the Asantehene's 27th enstoolment anniversary gala at Manhyia Palace, where he received a commemorative gold coin in recognition of his role in resolving long-standing chieftaincy and land disputes.

=== Foreign honours ===
- Burkina Faso:
  - Grand Cross of the National Order of Burkina Faso (6 May 2017)
- France:
  - Grand Officer of the Legion of Honour (14 November 2024)
- Guinea-Bissau:
  - Recipient of the Medal of Amílcar Cabral (15 May 2023)
- Guyana:
  - Member of the Order of Excellence (11 June 2019)
- Ivory Coast:
  - Grand Cross of the National Order of the Ivory Coast (5 May 2017)
- Liberia:
  - Grand Cordon of the Order of the Pioneers of Liberia (27 May 2017)
- Morocco:
  - Collar of the Order of Muhammad (17 February 2017)
- Portugal:
  - Grand Collar of the Order of Prince Henry (2023)
- Senegal:
  - Grand Cross of the National Order of the Lion (16 May 2017)
- Serbia:
  - Order of the Republic of Serbia, Second Class (10 October 2021)
- Sierra Leone:
  - Grand Commander of the Order of the Republic (27 April 2021)

== See also ==
- Ofori-Atta family
- Cabinet of Akufo-Addo government
- Nana Akufo-Addo administration controversies

Parliament of Ghana
| New constituency | Member of Parliament for Abuakwa; 1997–2005 | Constituency abolished |
| New constituency | Member of Parliament for Akim Abuakwa South; 2005–2009 | Succeeded by Samuel Atta Akyea |
Political offices
| Preceded by Obed Asamoah | Attorney General of Ghana; 2001–2003 | Succeeded by Papa Owusu-Ankomah |
| Preceded by Hackman Owusu-Agyeman | Minister of Foreign Affairs; 2003–2007 | Succeeded by Akwasi Osei-Adjei |
| Preceded by John Mahama | President of Ghana; 2017–2025 | Succeeded by John Mahama |
Party political offices
| Preceded by John Kufuor. | New Patriotic Party nominee for President of Ghana; 2008, 2012, 2016, 2020 | Most recent |
