= Kume Preko =

Kume Preko was the name given to an anti-government demonstration that occurred in Ghana in 1995, led by Charles Wereko Brobbey. The protest took place in opposition to the Value Added Tax (VAT) initiative which was introduced under the Jerry John Rawlings administration. It is said to have been one of the biggest protests ever organised in the country, with an estimated 100,000 people participating.

The demonstration was initially billed as a peaceful protest but quickly became violent when unidentified assailants shot live bullets into the crowd resulting in the deaths of some protestors.

== Etymology ==
"Kume Preko" means "You may as well kill me" in the Akan language spoken by the majority of Akan people in Ghana

== Reports ==
In the aftermath of the demonstration, some of the leading protestors - Nana Akufo-Addo, Charles Wereko-Brobby, Kwesi Pratt Jnr, Akoto Ampaw and Napoleon Abdulai wrote a book "Ghana: The Kume Preko demonstrations: Poverty, Corruption and the Rawlings Dictatorship".
