= Okaikwei South =

Ghana parliament constituency

- constituency for the Parliament of Ghana
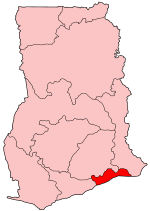
- District: Accra Metropolitan Assembly
- Region: Greater Accra Region of Ghana

Current constituency
- Party: National Democratic Congress
- MP: Ernest Adomako

Okaikwei South is one of the constituencies represented in the Parliament of Ghana. It elects one Member of Parliament (MP) by the first past the post system of election. Okaikwei South is located in the Accra Metropolitan Assembly of the Greater Accra Region of Ghana.

== Members of Parliament ==
Election	Member	Party
1992	Samuel Wise Quarcoo	EGLE
1996	Nana Akomea	New Patriotic Party
2000	Nana Akomea	New Patriotic Party
2004	Nana Akomea	New Patriotic Party
2008	Nana Akomea	New Patriotic Party
2012	Arthur Ahmed	New Patriotic Party
2016	Arthur Ahmed	New Patriotic Party
2020	Dakoa Newman	New Patriotic Party
2021	Dakoa Newman	New Patriotic Party
2022	Dakoa Newman	New Patriotic Party
2023	Dakoa Newman	New Patriotic Party
2024	Dakoa Newman	New Patriotic Party
2025	Ernest Adomako Keon	National Democratic Congress

== Elections ==
MPs elected in the Ghanaian parliamentary election, 2008:Okaikwei South Source: Ghana Home Page
Party	Candidate	Votes	%	±%
New Patriotic Party	Nana Akomea	35,819	54.9	—
National Democratic Congress	Isaac Mensah	25,819	39.5	—
Convention People's Party	Anthony Mensah	3,428	5.2	—
Democratic Freedom Party	William Aryee	231	0.4	—
Majority		10,000	14.5	—
Turnout		—	—	—

== See also ==
- List of Ghana Parliament constituencies
