= Victor Newman (politician) =

Ghanaian politician (died 2020)

Victor Nicholas Ohene Kwaku Newman was a founding member of New Patriotic Party and before his death was an administrative staff member in the Fourth Republic of Ghana serving as Director of Research in the government of Nana Akufo-Addo. He died on 10 December 2020.

He is the father of Member of Parliament Elect for Okaikoi South Constituency Dakoa Newman.
