= Danquah Institute =

Political think tank based in Accra, Ghana

Danquah Institute is a political think tank based in Accra, Ghana. It was named after Dr. Joseph Boakye Danquah, a member of "The Big Six" and one of the founding fathers of Ghana. It aligns and promote the Danquah-Busia-Dombo ideology.

== History and operations ==
It was founded by Gabby Asare Otchere-Darko in 2008, who served as the first executive director. He was succeeded by Dr. Kingsley Nyarko, a senior lecturer at the University of Ghana in 2017. Mr. Richard Ahiagbah in 2019, was appointed as the acting executive director.

The think tank operations are centred on researching and publishing research papers on issues of governance, economy and media. It organizes memorial lectures to commemorate the birthday of J. B. Danquah.
