= Nana Atta Wusu Yiakosan =

Nana Atta Wusu Yiakosan was the leader of Akyem Abuakwa as a vassal of the Ashanti Empire up until 1811. In that year, he led a rebellion against Ashanti rule in his region, resulting in the deaths of at least 100 Ashanti individuals.

The rebellion was subsequently suppressed by an army led by Opoku Frefre.

== Sources ==
- Larry W. Yarak. Asante and the Dutch, 1744-1873. Oxford: Clarendon Press, 1990. p. 37.
