= Bob Pixel =

Ghanaian photographer and graphic designer (1976–2021)

- Born: Emmanuel Yeboah Bobbie; 1 August 1976; Ghana
- Died: 25 February 2021 (aged 44); Ghana
- Education: Kwame Nkrumah University of Science and Technology
- Occupation: Photographer
- Spouse: Vida Aba Essel
- Children: 3

Emmanuel Yeboah Bobbie (1 August 1976 – 25 February 2021), also known as Bob Pixel, was a professional Ghanaian photographer and graphic designer. He created his own brand in the form of documenting events like funerals and festivals. He worked with celebrities such as M.anifest, John Dumelo, Yvonne Nelson, Menaye Donkor, Jackie Appiah and others. He was to participate in the 2021 International Fashion Week in Amsterdam. He was also nominated for the 2021 Photographer of the Year in the Entertainment Achievement Awards.

== Personal life and education ==
Emmanuel Yeboah Bobbie had his early education at the Foster International School in Kokomlemle, Accra, where his passion for art was born. He passed his Common Entrance examinations in 1989, and continued to Odorgonno Senior Secondary School (OSSA) in Accra, where he studied Art for his "O-level" certificate in 1994. He continued to Abuakwa State College (ABUSCO) in Kyebi, where he obtained the "A-level" certificate, also in Art, in 1996. Bob attended Kwame Nkrumah University of Science and Technology (KNUST), where he graduated with Bachelor of Science degree in Communication Design, 2001. He left behind three children.

== Career ==
He was a photographer; a member of the Association of Professional Photographers of Ghana, known for possessing a keen eye at capturing phenomenal images of tourist sites in Ghana and other social gatherings. He worked with international agencies such as UNICEF (Living with Refugees), Ecobank, Woodin Fashion, Vodafone, GH Fan Milk, Emirates, Samsung, Coca-Cola, and others.

== Award ==
In March 2021, he was posthumously awarded the 'Best Photographer' Award at the Entertainment Achievement Awards.

== Death and burial ==
He died on 25 February 2021. According to some reports, the cause of his death was unknown. Some reports claimed he died of COVID-19 complications during the COVID-19 pandemic in Ghana. On 20 March 2021, he was laid in state at his residence in Ablekuma for his final funeral rites. He was buried at the Ablekuma cemetery in Accra.
