= Agnes Yewande Savage =

Scottish-Nigerian physician (1906–1964)

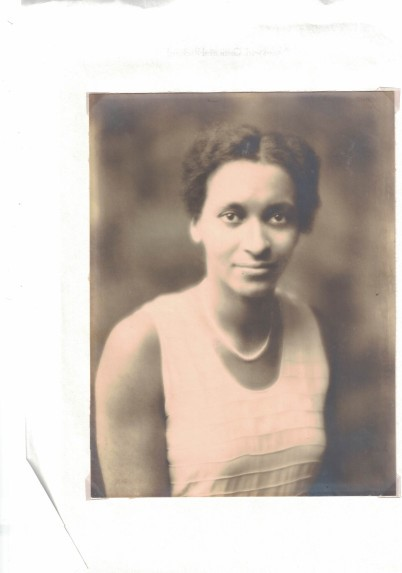
- Born: 21 February 1906; Edinburgh, Scotland
- Died: 7 September 1964 (aged 58); Hemel Hempstead, England
- Education: Royal College of Music; George Watson's Ladies College; University of Edinburgh
- Occupation: Physician
- Known for: First West African woman in orthodox medicine; Empowerment of women in West Africa; Co-founding Korle-Bu Nurses Training College
- Parents: Richard Akinwande Savage Sr (father); Maggie S. Bowie (mother)
- Relatives: Richard Gabriel Akinwande Savage (brother)

Agnes Yewande Savage (21 February 1906 – 7 September 1964) was a Nigerian–Scottish medical doctor and the first West African woman to train and qualify in orthodox medicine. Savage was the first West African woman to receive a university degree in medicine, graduating with first-class honours from the University of Edinburgh in 1929 at the age of 23. In 1933, Sierra Leonean political activist and higher education pioneer, Edna Elliott-Horton became the second West African woman university graduate and the first to earn a bachelor's degree in the liberal arts.

== Early life and education ==
Savage was born on 21 February 1906 in Edinburgh, Scotland, to Richard Akinwande Savage Sr (a Nigerian medical doctor, newspaper publisher and a 1900 Edinburgh graduate of Sierra Leone Creole descent) and Maggie S. Bowie (a working-class Scotswoman). Her brother was Richard Gabriel Akinwande Savage, also a doctor who graduated from Edinburgh in 1926. Savage passed exams to the Royal College of Music in 1919, at the age of thirteen, and was given a scholarship to study at George Watson's Ladies College. There, she received an award for General Proficiency in Class Work and passed the Scottish Higher Education Leaving Certificate.

In 1924, Savage entered Edinburgh University, where she was the first Nigerian woman to be admitted to study medicine. She excelled in her studies. In her fourth year of medical school, she earned first-class honours in all subjects, won a prize in Diseases of the Skin and a medal in Forensic Medicine, making her the first woman in the history of Edinburgh to do so. (Note: A newspaper report of the graduation ceremonies noted: "Among the 95 medical graduates, was a young lady of colour from West Africa, bearing the not inappropriate name Agnes Yewande Savage, whose father is also a doctor. She gained the two prizes awarded to the most distinguished woman student of her year, and her success, to judge from her enthusiastic reception, was highly popular with her fellow undergraduates.") She was awarded the Dorothy Gilfillan Memorial Prize as the best woman graduate in 1929, and a medal for most outstanding female graduate from the Scottish Association for Medical Education of Women. She also earned the qualification of a MC.CHB which is a Bachelor of Medicine, Bachelor of Surgery degree.

== Medical career and legacy ==
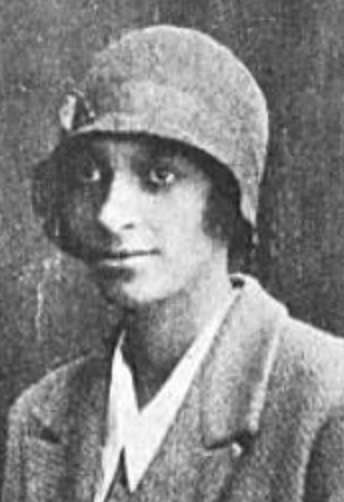
Agnes Yewande Savage, from a 1929 issue of The Crisis

Savage faced gender and racial institutional barriers in her career. After graduation, she joined the colonial service in the Gold Coast (present-day Ghana) as a Junior Medical Officer. Though better qualified than most of her male counterparts, she received fewer benefits. Two examples of this was being paid a lot less and having to live in the servants quarters.

In 1931, she was recruited by the headmaster of Achimota College. At the urging of the headmaster, Alec Garden Fraser, the colonial government gave her a better contract. She was with Achimota for four years as a medical officer and a teacher. While at Achimota, she came into contact with Susan de Graft-Johnson when the latter was the Girls' School Prefect. Johnson regularly worked with Savage at the sick bay, and later went on to also study medicine at the University of Edinburgh, becoming Ghana's first female medical doctor. Another West African woman, a medical pioneer, who studied at both Achimota and Edinburgh was Matilda J. Clerk, who became the first Ghanaian woman to win a university merit scholarship, the second female doctor in Ghana and the fourth West African woman to train as a physician.

In 1945, after Achimota, Savage went back to the colonial medical service and was given a better concession, in charge of the infant welfare clinics, associated with Korle Bu Hospital in Accra. Concurrently, she was appointed the assistant medical officer of the maternity department of the hospital and warden of the nurses' hostel. At Korle-Bu, she supervised the establishment of a training school for nurses, Korle-Bu Nurses Training College, where a ward was named in her honour.

== Death ==
Savage retired relatively early due to "physical and psychological exhaustion" in 1947 and spent the remainder of her life in Scotland raising her niece and nephew Margaret and Mike. Her residence was in Frithsden Copse, and she lived with her friend Esther Appleyard (who had been the Chief Education Officer in Ghana). She died following a stroke, in St Paul's Hospital, Hemel Hempstead, England, on 7 September 1964, aged 58.

== Other facts ==
A Nigerian author by the name of Emeka 'Ed' Keazor who wrote the book 120 Great Nigerians You Never Knew mentions that Agnes "'left one of the greatest legacies for Nigerian women by becoming the first Nigerian female to graduate as a medical doctor. Thousands have followed in her footsteps, but her outstanding academic achievements, her pedigree, and the quality of her work stand out'.

== See also ==
- Timeline of women in science
- Women in medicine
