= J. B. Danquah =

Ghanaian politician and lawyer (1895–1965)

Nana J. B. Danquah
- Born: Joseph Kwame Kyeretwie Boakye Danquah; 18 December 1895; Bepong, Gold Coast
- Died: 4 February 1965 (aged 69); Nsawam, Ghana
- Education: University of London (B.A.; Ph.D.); Inner Temple
- Occupations: Lawyer, politician
- Political party: United Gold Coast Convention; Ghana Congress Party; National Liberation Movement; United Party
- Spouse(s): Mabel Dove (m, 1933; div. mid-1940s); Elizabeth Vardon
- Children: 4, including Paul Danquah
- Relatives: Nana Ofori Atta I (brother); Nana Akufo-Addo (great-nephew); Kwaku Boateng (in-law); J. B. Danquah-Adu (grand-nephew)
- Website: danquahinstitutegh.org

Joseph Kwame Kyeretwie Boakye Danquah (18 December 1895 – 4 February 1965) was a Ghanaian politician, scholar, anglophile, lawyer and statesman. He was a politician in pre and post-colonial Ghana, which was formerly the Gold Coast.

A member of the United Gold Coast Convention (UGCC), Danquah was one of the primary opposition leaders to Ghanaian president and independence leader Kwame Nkrumah, stemming from differences in their vision for the future of the country. Danquah was described as the "doyen of Gold Coast politics" by the Watson Commission of Inquiry into the 1948 Accra riots and was a member of the "Big Six".

== Early life and education ==
J. B. Danquah was born on 18 December 1895 in the town of Bepong in Kwahu in the Eastern Region of Ghana (then the Gold Coast). He hailed from the royal family of Ofori Panin Fie, once the rulers of the Akyem states, and one of the most influential families in Ghanaian politics. His elder brother was Nana Sir Ofori Atta I and his son was actor Paul Danquah.

At the age of six, Danquah began schooling at the Basel Mission School at Kyebi. He attended the Basel Mission Senior School at Begoro. On successful completion of his standard seven examinations in 1912, he was employed by Vidal J. Buckle, a barrister-at-law in Accra, as a clerk, a job that aroused his interest in law.

After passing the Civil Service Examinations in 1914, Danquah became a clerk at the Supreme Court of the Gold Coast, which gave him the experience to be appointed by his brother, Nana Sir Ofori Atta I, who had become chief two years earlier, as secretary of the Omanhene's Tribunal in Kyebi. Following the influence of his brother, Danquah was appointed as the assistant secretary of the Conference of Paramount Chiefs of the Eastern Province, which was later given statutory recognition to become the Eastern Provincial Council of Chiefs. His brilliance influenced his brother to send him to Britain in 1921 to read law.

After two unsuccessful attempts at the University of London matriculation, Danquah passed in 1922, enabling him to enter the University College of London as a philosophy student. He earned his B.A. degree in 1925, winning the John Stuart Mill Scholarship in the Philosophy of Mind and Logic. He then embarked on a Doctor of Philosophy degree, which he earned in two years with a thesis entitled "The Moral End as Moral Excellence". He became the first West African to obtain the Doctor of Philosophy degree from a British university. While he worked on his thesis, he entered the Inner Temple and was called to the Bar in 1926.

During his student days, he had two sons and two daughters by two different women, neither of whom he married. In London, Danquah took time off his studies to participate in student politics, serving as editor of the West African Students' Union (WASU) magazine and becoming the Union's president.

== Career ==
Danquah went into private legal practice upon his return to Ghana in 1927. In 1929 he helped J. E. Casely Hayford found the Gold Coast Youth Conference (GCYC) and was Secretary General from 1937 to 1947. In 1931, Danquah established The Times of West Africa, originally called the West Africa Times, which was the first daily newspaper in Ghana published between 1931 and 1935. A column called "Women's Corner" was pseudonymously written by Mabel Dove, daughter of prominent barrister Frans Dove. She became Danquah's first wife in 1933, bearing him a son. Danquah later married Elizabeth Vardon. In 1935, he became an executive member of the International African Friends of Ethiopia, a Pan-Africanist organization based in London.

=== Politics ===
Danquah became a member of the Legislative Council in 1946 and actively pursued independence legislation for the middle Akan belt of the Gold Coast. In 1947, he was a founding member of the pro-independence United Gold Coast Convention (UGCC) founded by George Alfred Grant as a combination of chiefs, academics and lawyers, Robert Benjamin Blay, R. A. Awoonor-Williams, Edward Akufo-Addo, and Emmanuel Obetsebi-Lamptey. Kwame Nkrumah was invited to be the new party's general secretary. In 1948, following a boycott of European imports initiated by a chief in Accra and subsequent rioting in Accra, Danquah was one of the "Big Six" (the others being Nkrumah, Akufo-Addo, Obetsebi-Lamptey, Ebenezer Ako-Adjei and William Ofori Atta) who were detained for a month by the colonial authorities.

Danquah's historical research led him to agree with Nkrumah's proposition that on independence the Gold Coast be renamed Ghana after the early African empire of that name. However, Danquah and Nkrumah subsequently disagreed over the direction of the independence movement and parted ways after two years. Nkrumah went on to form the Convention People's Party (CPP) and eventually gain Ghana independence and became the first president of Ghana.

==== Danquah's role in the founding of the University of Ghana ====
Danquah's role in the establishment of the University of Ghana, the premier and the largest university in Ghana, is still a matter of public debate, as it was actually built by Dr Kwame Nkrumah, who was then the Ghana Prime minister. Among other individuals and groups throughout the Gold Coast and West Africa, Danquah also advocated for its establishment in 1948 after a British report on higher education in West Africa recommended that only one university college, to be located in Nigeria, in association with the University of London, would be feasible for the whole of West Africa.

==== Arrest, detention and death ====
Danquah stood as a presidential candidate against Nkrumah in April 1960 but lost the election. On 3 October 1961, Danquah was arrested under the Preventive Detention Act, on the grounds of involvement with plans to subvert the CPP government and kill Nkrumah. He was released on 22 June 1962. He was later elected president of the Ghana Bar Association.

Danquah was again arrested on 8 January, with no charges made known. He suffered a heart attack – some claimed he was tortured – and died while in detention at Nsawam Medium Prison on 4 February 1965.

After the overthrow of the CPP government by the National Liberation Council (NLC) in February 1966, Danquah was given a national funeral.

== Publications ==
Among his writings are Gold Coast: Akan Laws and Customs and the Akim Abuakwa Constitution (1928), a play entitled The Third Woman (1943), and The Akan Doctrine of God (1944). The latter book demonstrated the compatibility of African religion with Christianity, and is considered a "milestone" for African Protestants looking for ways to reclaim their African heritage. He had no training as a theologian.

== Family ==
Kwaku Boateng and J. B. Danquah were related by marriage.

== Legacy ==
The J. B. Danquah Memorial Lecture Series was inaugurated in 1968 in memory of Danquah, who was also a founding member of the Ghana Academy of Arts and Sciences (GAAS).

The Danquah Institute is "a political think-tank of the New Patriotic Party (NPP)" in Ghana. It was set up in commemoration of his work and to promote his ideas posthumously.

Danquah Circle, a roundabout at Osu in Accra, was also named after him.
