= Akim Abuakwa South (Ghana parliament constituency) =

Constituency in the Eastern Region of Ghana

- constituency for the Parliament of Ghana
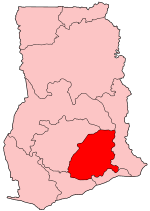
- District: East Akim Municipal District
- Region: Eastern Region of Ghana

Current constituency
- Party: New Patriotic Party
- MP: Kingsley Agyemang

The Akim Abuakwa South constituency is in the Eastern region of Ghana. The current member of Parliament for the constituency is Kingsley Agyemang. He was elected on the ticket of the New Patriotic Party (NPP) and won a majority, with 27,011 votes to win the constituency election to become the MP. He succeeded Samuel Atta Akyea who had represented the constituency in the 4th Republic parliament on the ticket of the New Patriotic Party (NPP).

== Members of Parliament ==
| First elected | Member | Party | Term |
|---|---|---|---|
| 1956 | Kwasi Sintim Aboagye | Convention People's Party | 1956–1965 |
| 2004 | Nana Akufo-Addo | New Patriotic Party | 2004–2008 |
| 2008 | Samuel Atta Akyea | New Patriotic Party | 2008–2012 |
| 2012 | Samuel Atta Akyea | New Patriotic Party | 2012-2016 |
| 2016 | Samuel Atta Akyea | New Patriotic Party | 2016-2020 |
| 2020 | Samuel Atta Akyea | New Patriotic Party | 2020-2024 |
| 2024 | Kingsley Agyemang | New Patriotic Party | 2024- |

== See also ==
- List of Ghana Parliament constituencies
