= Ken Ofori-Atta =

Ghanaian investment banker and government official

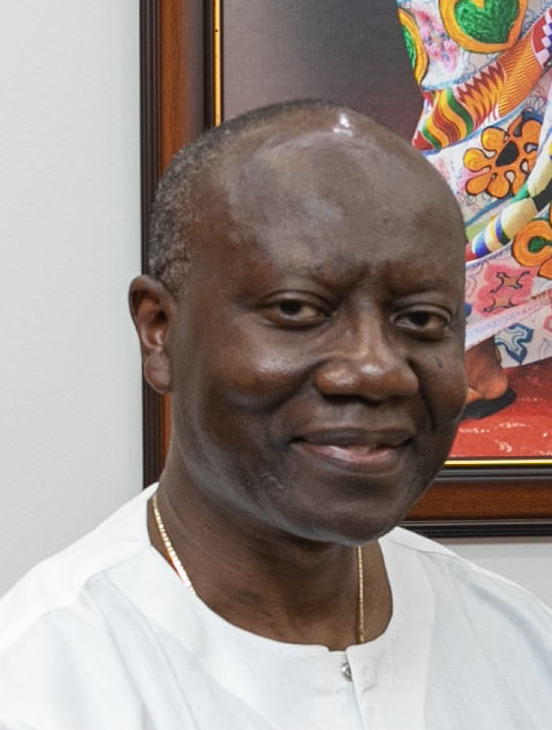
- Ken Ofori-Atta 2025

Minister for Finance and Economic Planning
- In office 27 January 2017 – 14 February 2024
- President: Nana Akufo-Addo
- Deputy: Kwaku Agyeman Kwarteng; Abena Osei Asare; Charles Adu Boahen
- Preceded by: Seth Terkper
- Succeeded by: Mohammed Amin Adam

Personal details
- Born: Kenneth Nana Yaw Kuntunkununku Ofori-Atta; 7 November 1959 (age 66) Kibi, Eastern Region, Ghana
- Spouse: Angela Lamensdorf Ofori-Atta
- Children: 4
- Parent: Jones Ofori Atta
- Relatives: Nana Akufo-Addo (cousin)
- Education: Columbia University (BA); Yale University (MBA)
- Occupation: Economist; Investment banker; Politician

Kenneth Nana Yaw Ofori-Atta (born 7 November 1959), is a Ghanaian investment banker who served as the minister for finance and economic planning in the cabinet of Nana Akufo-Addo from 2017 to 2024. He is co-founder of Databank Group, a Ghanaian financial services company, and was executive chairman until 2012 when he resigned.

== Early life and education ==
Ken Ofori-Atta was born on 7 November 1958 in Kibi, a town in the Eastern Region of Ghana. He is the son of the economist and politician Jones Ofori Atta. Ofori-Atta attended A.N.T. 1 Experimental School in Accra New Town for his primary school education and subsequently Achimota School for his O-Level and A-Level certificates received in 1976 and 1978 respectively. He got a temporary job as a mathematics teacher at Accra Academy in the period after his A-level at Achimota. In August 1980, Ofori-Atta was enrolled at Columbia University for a B.A. in Economics. He graduated from Columbia in 1984 and worked at Morgan Stanley in New York. He studied for and received an MBA from the Yale University School of Management in 1988 and went to work for the investment bank, Salomon Brothers.

== Career ==
=== Finance ===
Ofori-Atta has business interests in insurance, retail banking, private equity, microfinance, pharmaceuticals, and real estate.

In 1996, Ofori-Atta was the first African to testify at the US Congress Ways and Means Committee to support the African Growth and Opportunity Act.

Ofori-Atta was a director of numerous companies and a member of some other boards. He was a director for Enterprise Group Ltd and Trust Bank Ltd of The Gambia, of which he is the chairman. He also was a director at the International Bank and is also a board member of the Acumen Fund.

== Political career ==
Ofori-Atta was President Nana Akufo-Addo’s nominee to assess the health of the economy during the transition period after the 2016 elections.

He was nominated by President Nana Akufo-Addo, on 10 January 2017 and assumed office on 27 January 2017 as finance minister.

In May 2017, Nana Akufo-Addo named Ken Ofori-Atta as part of nineteen ministers who would form his cabinet. The names of the 19 ministers were submitted to the Parliament of Ghana and were announced by the speaker of the House, Aaron Mike Oquaye. As a cabinet minister, Ken Ofori-Atta was an integral part of the inner circle of president Akufo-Addo.

Ofori-Atta was elected chair of the World Bank/IMF Development Committee at the 2018 spring meetings and also chairs the governing board of the African Capacity Building Foundation (ACBF). In addition, he chaired the African Caucus at the World Bank.

During his time in office, Ofori-Atta oversaw Ghana's debt restructuring efforts after the country defaulted on most of its external debt in December 2022.

== Parliamentary motion of censure ==
On 25 October 2022, 80 out of the 137 New Patriotic Party (NPP) lawmakers dared President Nana Akufo-Addo to sack Ofori-Atta as finance minister, citing his inability to properly handle the Ghanaian economy. Akufo-Addo sacked Ofori-Atta's deputy over corruption claims but kept Ofori-Atta at post saying that there is no basis for sacking him.

In November 2022, a motion of censure was started to remove Ofori-Atta from office due to the decline of Ghana's economy, leading to the Ghanaian cedi being ranked as one of the worst in the world. The motion failed as it was not able to gain two-thirds majority to pass, securing only 136 votes out of 275 votes.

=== IMF Bailout ===
In May 2021, Ofori-Atta in a press conference indicated that Ghana will not seek the assistance of the International Monetary Fund (IMF) in managing the rising debt situation. This was on the back of the Government of Ghana's ambitious agenda of 'Ghana Beyond Aid' unveiled in 2018 by President Akufo-Addo. However, a press statement issued by the Finance Ministry indicated that the Government of Ghana had engaged with the IMF for assistance in managing its debts to sustainable levels, after President Akufo-Addo directed the finance minister in July 2022 to formally engage with the fund for an 18th economic programme.

In December 2022, the IMF reached a staff-level agreement on Ghana's $3 billion debt bailout with board approval in early 2023 as indicated in a press conference by Ofori-Atta.

On 17 May 2023, the IMF board approved a $3-billion Extended Credit Facility Arrangement for Ghana.

On 10 January 2023, Ofori-Atta was appointed caretaker minister of the Ministry of Trade and Industry following the resignation of Alan John Kyerematen.

On 14 February 2024, he was replaced as finance minister by President Akufo-Addo in a cabinet reshuffle following criticism of his handling of the country's economic woes. He was replaced by Mohammed Amin Adam.

=== Financial misconduct allegations ===
In early February 2025, Ken Ofori-Atta was added to the special prosecutor’s wanted list over financial misconduct charges. But on February 18, 2025, his name was removed after he pledged to return voluntarily. A red notice was subsequently placed on him by Interpol in June 2025 when he failed to appear, reportedly on medical grounds. He was said to be undergoing treatment for prostate cancer. In November 2025, Interpol suspended Ofori-Atta's Red Notice citing concerns over the Special Prosecutors compliance with its rules and regulations. In February 2026, INTERPOL permanently removed the red notice after a review from its oversight committee. According to the commission for the control of INTERPOL's files, the request for his arrest "appeared to be predominantly political in nature and did not meet their neutrality requirements."

In January 2026, Ofori-Atta was apprehended by United States Immigration and Customs Enforcement agents and detained at a facility in Virginia following issues with his stay in the US. He was released from custody on April 7, 2026, after posting a $65,000 bond.

== Other activities ==
- Joint World Bank-IMF Development Committee, chair (2018–2024)
- African Development Bank (AfDB), ex-officio member of the board of governors (2017–2024)
- ECOWAS Bank for Investment and Development (EBID), ex-officio member of the board of governors (2017–2024)
- Multilateral Investment Guarantee Agency (MIGA), World Bank Group, ex-officio member of the board of governors (2017–2024)
- World Bank, ex-officio member of the board of governors (2017–2024)
- African Capacity Building Foundation (ACBF), chair of the board of governors

== Awards and recognition ==
Ofori-Atta is a Henry Crown fellow of the Aspen Institute. He was adjudged as the 2nd most respected C.E.O in Ghana. Ken is a Donaldson Fellow at Yale University in 2010 and a recipient of the John Jay Award from Columbia University in 2011. He is a co-founder of the Aspen Africa Leadership Initiative.

He was honored by PricewaterhouseCoopers Ghana twice as one of the Top 5 Most Respected CEOs in Ghana.

In May 2018, he was adjudged Best Africa Finance Minister of the year by London-based magazine The Banker.

He was named one of Africa's most politically connected bankers by The Africa Report in 2021.

== Personal life ==
=== Marriage and children ===
He is married to Professor Angela Lamensdorf Ofori-Atta, an associate professor in Clinical Psychology at the University of Ghana Medical School and former deputy minister for Manpower Development and Employment from 2003 to 2005 under the Kufour administration. Ofori-Atta has three children with his wife and an adopted daughter.

=== COVID-19, health and death rumors ===
There were rumors that Ofori-Atta died from COVID-19 after testing positive when he traveled to the United States on 15 February 2021 for medical review. The Ministry of Finance in a statement denied that he had died but acknowledged that he was receiving treatment outside Ghana due to medical complications after contracting COVID-19 in December 2020.

Political offices
Preceded by Seth Terkper	Minister for Finance and Economic Planning; 2017-2024	Succeeded by Mohammed Amin Adam
Preceded by Alan John Kyerematen	Acting Minister for Trade and Industry; 2023	Incumbent
