= Kwesi Amoako-Atta =

Ghanaian politician (1920–1983)

Minister for Finance
- In office 1964–1966
- President: Kwame Nkrumah
- Preceded by: Ferdinand Koblavi Dra Goka
- Succeeded by: Akwasi Afrifa

Member of the Ghana Parliament for Kade
- In office 1965–1966
- Preceded by: New
- Succeeded by: Kwaku Bugyei Ntim

Member of the Ghana Parliament for Akim Abuakwa West
- In office 1964–1965
- Preceded by: Michael Reynolds Darku-Sarkwa
- Succeeded by: Constituency abolished

Personal details
- Born: Kwesi Amoako-Atta; 18 December 1920 Kibi, Eastern Region, Gold Coast
- Died: 1983 (aged 62–63)
- Party: Convention People's Party
- Spouse(s): Cecilia Ampaw (m. 1946; div. 1966) Emelia Lutterodt (m. 1957; div. 1965) Mary Magdaline Okine (m. 1962)
- Children: 9
- Parents: Ofori Atta I; Agnes Akosua Dodua
- Relatives: William Ofori Atta (brother); Kofi Asante Ofori-Atta (brother); Susan Ofori-Atta (sister); Adeline Akufo-Addo (sister); Jones Ofori Atta (brother)
- Profession: Banker

Kwesi Amoako-Atta (18 December 1920 – 1983) was a Ghanaian banker and politician. During the First Republic, he served as the Minister for Finance from 1964 to 1966. He also served as a member of parliament for the Akim Abuakwa West constituency from 1964 to 1965 and the Kade constituency from 1965 to 1966. Prior to politics, Amoako-Atta was a banker. He worked with the Bank of British West Africa and the Bank of the Gold Coast (now Ghana Commercial Bank) prior to his appointment as deputy Governor of the Bank of Ghana. He was the deputy Governor of the Bank of Ghana from 1960 until 1964 when he resigned to enter politics.

== Early life and education ==
Amoako-Atta was born on 18 December 1920 in Kibi in the Eastern Region of Ghana (then Gold Coast). He studied at the Local Government School in Kibi from 1926 to 1936 where he obtained his Standard Seven Certificate.

== Career ==
At the age of 16 he was employed by the Bank of British West Africa as a clerk. While working at the bank, he studied banking and obtained his Diploma in Banking in 1945. He began studies for an external degree from the University of London but was unable to complete his course. While at the bank, he succeeded in organising his colleagues into a trade union and from 1945 to 1949 he was the Secretary of the Bank Employees Union and General Secretary when there was a split in the Union. In 1949 he was promoted to managerial status, this made him one of the first three Africans to attain this feat. As a manager, he was assigned to the Credit Department of the High Street Branch of the bank as its manager. In March 1953 he resigned from the bank and joined the Bank of the Gold Coast (now Ghana Commercial Bank). He was the foreign exchange and credit manager at the bank until 1957 when he was appointed assistant manager to the bank. In 1958 he gained a travelling scholarship and was attached to various banking institutions at various periods. These banking institutions were: The Workers' Bank (Bank Hapoalim) in Tel Aviv, The Central Bank of Israel in Jerusalem, Glyn Mills and Company in London, the Royal Bank of Scotland in Edinburgh, Agricultural Mortgage Corporation then in London and the Scottish Investment Institution. From 1958 to 1960 he was attached to the Messrs J. Henry Schroder Banking Corporation in New York City, and to the Bank Leumi Le-Israel in Tel Aviv, Israel. In July 1960 he was appointed Deputy Governor of the Bank of Ghana and he held this office until 30 April 1964 when he resigned to enter politics.

== Politics ==
Amoako-Atta became a member of parliament in 1964 replacing Michael Reynolds Darku-Sarkwa (who died that same year) as Member of Parliament for the Akim Abuakwa West Constituency. He was elected unopposed in the parliamentary by-election on the ticket of the Convention People's Party. That same year he was appointed Minister for Finance and in 1965 he became the member of parliament for the Kade constituency. He served in this capacity while doubling as the Minister for Finance until February 1966 when the Nkrumah government was overthrown.

In the post Nkrumah regime, he held various public posts such as serving as a Financial consultant to Tata Brewery in 1974 and serving in the National Redemption Council (NRC) government as a consultant on matters affecting socialist countries from 1973 to 1976.

== Personal life ==
Amoako-Atta married Cecilia Ampaw in 1946 and the marriage was dissolved in 1966. Together they had six children. In 1957 he married a second wife; Emelia Lutterodt but had no issue with her until the marriage broke down in 1965. He married Mary Magdaline Okine in 1962, with whom he had three daughters, and stayed with until his death in 1983.

== See also ==
- Minister for Finance and Economic Planning
- List of MLAs elected in the 1956 Gold Coast legislative election
- List of MPs elected in the 1965 Ghanaian parliamentary election
