= Ernest Adomako =

Ghanaian politician

Ernest Adomako is a Ghanaian politician and member of the ninth Parliament of the Fourth Republic of Ghana, representing the Okaikwei South Constituency in the Greater Accra Region on the ticket of the National Democratic Congress (NPC).

== Early life and background ==
Publicly available information about Ernest Adomako's early life, including date and place of birth, education, and professional background before entering politics, is limited. He is commonly referred to by the nickname "KEON."

== Political career ==
In the 2024 general elections, Ernest Adomako contested the Okaikwei South parliamentary seat on the ticket of the NDC. He won the seat with 32,691 votes, defeating the incumbent MP, Darkoa Newman of the New Patriotic Party (NPP), who secured 24,263 votes. This victory ended the NPP's 28-year hold on the constituency. Upon assuming office, Adomako expressed his commitment to addressing key issues in the constituency, including infrastructure development, education, and employment opportunities. He emphasized the importance of engaging with local industries to create jobs for unemployed youth and pledged to modernize the Kaneshie market to improve conditions for traders.

== Constituency development initiatives ==
In February 2025, Ernest Adomako launched a public schools renovation project in Okaikwei South, estimated at GH¢79.5 million. The initiative aims to improve learning environments for over 8,000 students and 350 teachers across 20 public schools. The first phase focuses on the Bishop School in Bubiashie, with plans to extend renovations to other schools, including the Awudome Cluster and Kaneshie Methodist Cluster. The project includes refurbishing classrooms, installing secure fencing, replacing outdated furniture, and setting up libraries and ICT centers. Adomako personally financed the initial phase and seeks additional funding from donor organizations and corporate institutions for subsequent phases.
