= Ofori Panin Fie (Okyenhene's Palace) =

Royal residence in Ghana

Ofori Panin Fie (Okyenhene's Palace) is the royal palace of the Omanhene of Akyem Abuakwa. It is located in Kyebi, in the Eastern Region of Ghana.

The name Ofori Panin Fie is also otherwise ascribed to the kingdom's royal family as well.

== History ==
Ofori Panin-fie is a palace that accommodates the "Hall of Justice", ancient artifacts and archival records dating back to the 15th century. It is a research centre for researchers in West African history, Ghana, and the Laws of the Akans. It appeals to tourists and researchers interested in African History and Culture.

As of this edit, this article uses content from "Okyehene's Palace (Ofori Panyin Fie)", which is licensed in a way that permits reuse under the Creative Commons Attribution-ShareAlike 3.0 Unported License, but not under the GFDL. All relevant terms must be followed.
