= Kwesi Pratt Jnr =

Ghanaian journalist

- Born: 7 September 1953 (age 73)
- Occupation: Managing editor of the Insight Newspaper
- Children: Maame Ama Pratt

Mr. Kwesi Pratt Jnr. (born 7 September 1953) is a Ghanaian journalist, and managing editor of the Insight newspaper. He was a member of Alliance for Change, the organisers of the 1995 Kume Preko anti-government demonstration. He is the founder and owner of the Pan African Television network in Ghana. He is also affiliated with the Socialist Movement of Ghana.

== Politics ==
Pratt is a Convention People's Party (CPP) member and has occupied many roles in the party, including his appointment in 2006 as the Publicity committee chairman of the party.

In 2020, he appealed to the government to instill fear into the public to reduce the impact of the COVID-19 pandemic.

He recently challenged the wisdom of the government giving up Ghana's gold resources to foreign mining companies to exploit and leave Ghana with little to no returns.

== Honors ==
On September 2026, the University of Cape Coast (UCC) conferred an honorary Doctor of Letters (D.Litt.), honoris causa, on Ghanaian journalist and Pan-Africanist Kwesi Pratt Jnr. The award was presented following his delivery of the 15th Kwame Nkrumah Memorial Lecture, where he spoke on themes of constitutionalism, development, and Pan-Africanism.

The university stated that the honorary degree recognized Pratt's decades of contributions to journalism, political education, and Pan-African thought. Pratt is a veteran journalist and a coordinating committee member of the Pan-African Progressive Front (PPF).

The conferment made him an honorary doctorate holder of the University of Cape Coast.

== Calls for Socialist Pan-African Unity as UCC Confers Honorary Doctorate ==
In September 2026, Ghanaian journalist and Pan-Africanist Kwesi Pratt Jnr. delivered the 15th Kwame Nkrumah Memorial Lecture at the University of Cape Coast, speaking on the theme "Kwame Nkrumah: Yesterday, Today and Tomorrow: Perspectives on Constitutionalism, Development and Pan-Africanism." Following the lecture, the university awarded him an honorary Doctor of Letters (D.Litt.) in recognition of his work in journalism, political education, and Pan-African thought.

In his address, Pratt argued that Nkrumah's legacy should be understood less as a series of commemorative symbols and more as an unfinished political project aimed at continental unity and economic independence. He contended that African states cannot achieve meaningful sovereignty while remaining economically dependent and politically fragmented, and he called for industrialization driven by public investment, continental economic planning, and African control over natural resources and financial institutions.

Pratt also discussed the 1966 overthrow of Nkrumah, framing it as a setback to both Ghana's state-led development agenda and the broader movement for African political union. He linked the coup to external interests opposed to Nkrumah's non-aligned and socialist orientation, and argued that political independence without economic independence remains fragile.

He further urged African universities to prioritize scientific research, technical innovation, and critical thinking over credential production, and called on younger generations to advance what he described as a renewed, democratic version of Nkrumah's vision. He concluded that African liberation, in his view, is achievable only through socialism.

The Pan-African Progressive Front, on whose coordinating committee Pratt serves, described the honorary degree as recognition of his decades of anti-imperialist and Pan-Africanist activism.
