= Samuel Atta Akyea =

Ghanaian lawyer and politician

Hon Samuel Atta Akyea MP
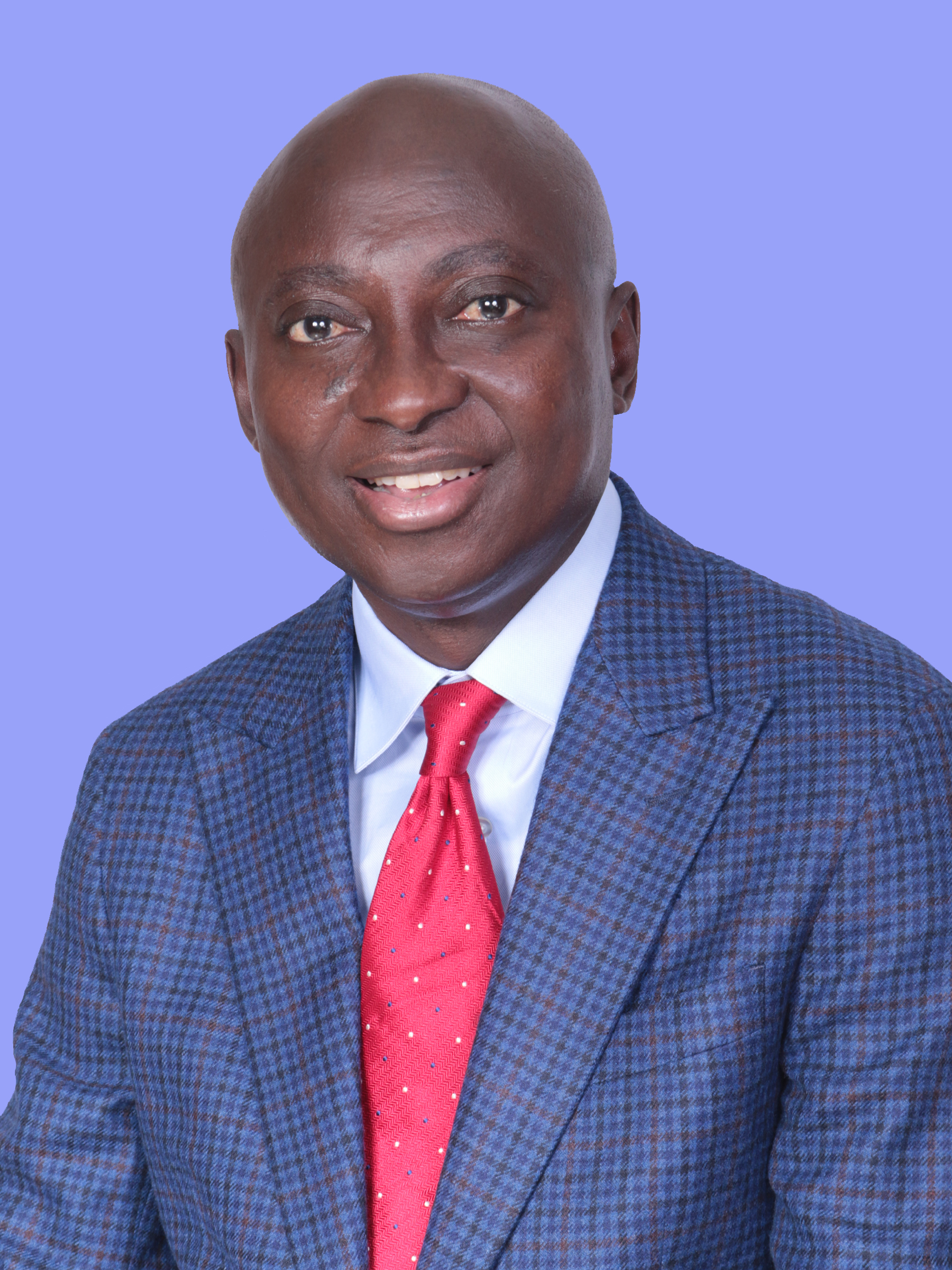

MP for Akim Abuakwa South
- In office January 2009 – January 2025
- President: J. A. Mills, John D. Mahama, Nana Akufo-Addo
- Preceded by: Nana Akufo-Addo
- Succeeded by: Kingsley Agyemang

Minister for Works and Housing
- In office 7 February 2017 – 7 January 2021
- President: Nana Akufo-Addo

Personal details
- Born: 20 August 1962 (age 64) Kyebi, Ghana
- Party: New Patriotic Party
- Children: 3
- Education: University of Ghana, Ghana School of Law
- Occupation: Politician
- Profession: Lawyer
- Committees: Mines and Energy Committee (Chairperson); Subsidiary Legislation Committee; Special Budget Committee

Samuel Atta Akyea (born 20 August 1962) is a Ghanaian lawyer, politician and a member of the New Patriotic Party. He was the Minister for Works and Housing from 2017 until January 2021. He was the Member of Parliament of Akim Abuakwa South constituency in the Eastern Region of Ghana between 2009 and 2025. He is the second person aside Nana Akufo-Addo to be elected as MP for that constituency in the 4th republic.

== Early life and education ==
He was born in Kyebi in the Eastern Region of Ghana. He attended the University of Ghana, Legon and graduated with a Bachelor of Arts degree in Law and Philosophy in 1989. He proceeded to the Ghana School of Law and obtained his practising license in 1993.

== Working life ==
After being called to the Bar in 1994, Atta Akyea was employed as a state attorney at the Attorney General's Department. He later joined the private law firm, Akufo-Addo, Prempeh & Co in Accra. In 2003, he founded the law firm, Zoe Akyea & Co. He worked there as head of Chamber until 2008 when he left legal practice for politics.

== Political life ==
Atta Akyea entered politics in 2008 when he was elected the parliamentarian for the Abuakwa South constituency. He competed against two other aspirants, namely, Sammy Osei of the National Democratic Congress and Nana Addo Aikins, an Independent candidate. He won the election by obtaining 22,681 votes out of the 30,109 which represented 75.3% of valid votes cast. He succeeded Nana Addo Dankwa Akufo-Addo, who stepped down as MP in order to concentrate on his presidential ambitions. Atta Akyea went on to retain his seat in the 2012, 2016 and 2020 elections. In parliament, he has served on various committees including the Finance, Public Accounts, Judiciary and Appointments Committees.

=== 2016 election ===
In the 2016 Ghanaian general election, he won the Abuakwa South Constituency parliamentary seat with 28,442 votes making 78.7.61% of the total votes cast whilst the NDC parliamentary candidate Owuraku Amofah had 7,697 votes making 21.3% of the total votes cast.

=== 2020 election ===
In the 2020 Ghanaian general election, he again won the Abuakwa South Constituency parliamentary seat with 29,897 votes making 75.7% of the total votes cast whilst the NDC parliamentary candidate Sanusi Mohammed had 7,740 votes making 19.6% of the total votes cast, the GUM parliamentary candidate Banning-Peprah Felix had 957 votes making 2.4% of the total votes cast and an Independent parliamentary candidate Marfo Enock Kwame had 905 votes making 2.3% of the total votes cast.

==== Member of the following previous Parliaments ====
7th Parliament (NPP)

6th Parliament (NPP)

5th Parliament (NPP)

=== Galamsey fight ===
Atta Akyea was accused of not doing enough to stop the use of the Birim River by galamseyers. The Birim river which passes through his constituency is a major river body in Ghana and supplies a substantial amount of the constituency's water requirement. Atta Akyea opined that the galamsey fight was a national problem requiring military support.

=== Committees ===
In 2021, Atta Akyea was made Chairperson of the Mines and Energy Committee. He is also a member of the Subsidiary Legislation and Special Budget Committees.

== Ministerial appointment ==
In January 2017, President Akufo-Addo nominated him to serve in his government as Minister for Works and Housing. Prior to his vetting by the appointments committee of Parliament, it emerged that he had made no input relevant to the ministry he had been nominated to head. In addition he had not been involved in any relevant interaction with Parliament's Works and Housing committee. To his credit however, was his track record of building strong institutions by upholding constitutional provisions. During his vetting by the appointments committee on January 31, he expressed his vision for the ministry and pledged to complete all uncompleted housing projects started by the erstwhile John Dramani Mahama administration. He told the committee that he would prioritise the construction of houses for members of the judiciary. He was sworn in along with eleven other ministers by President Akufo-Addo on 8 February 2017 at the Jubilee House. As Works and Housing Minister, Atta Akyea brought his legal expertise to bare, helping him to finalise the implementation of the Ghanaian building code and other legislative development.

== Personal life ==
He is married with three children and is a Christian. He is a member of the International Central Gospel Church.

== Award ==
At its 28th West African Nobles Conference and Awards in Accra, the non-governmental, non-religious, and nonprofit West African Nobles Forum (WANF) presented Hon. Samuel Atta Akyea, Minister of Works and Housing, with an award for preserving the virtues of honesty, integrity, and accountability.

== Controversy ==
In March 2022, he was chased out by the people in the Abuakwa South Constituency. It was alleged he failed to honor his campaign promises to the people.

== Philanthropy ==
In March 2020, he presented some sanitary products to his constituency in the fight against COVID-19 pandemic.

Political offices
Preceded by n/a	Minister of Works and Housing; Ghana; 2017–	Incumbent
