= Korle-Bu Nurses Training College =

Nursing training school

Nursing and Midwifery Training College, Korle-Bu

Location
- Korle-Bu, Accra

Information
- School type: Public health training institution
- Motto: Knowledge service to mankind
- Established: 1945
- Founder: Agnes Yewande Savage
- Oversight: Ministry of Health, Ghana
- Accreditation: National Accreditation Board, Ghana (NAB)
- Website: nmtckb.edu.gh/Web/index.php/office-of-the-principal/index.html

The Nursing and Midwifery Training College, Korle Bu (NMTC Korle-Bu), the premier institution in Ghana for nursing education, is located in Korle Bu in Greater Accra. The establishment of the college in 1945 was supervised by Agnes Yewande Savage, West Africa's first woman doctor. The college is a public health training institution, and it is supervised by the Ministry of Health, Ghana (MoH).

The Nursing and Midwifery Training College, Korle Bu is affiliated with the Kwame Nkrumah University of Science and Technology (KNUST) and it is accredited by the National Accreditation Board (NAB). The Nursing and Midwifery Council (N&MC), Ghana, is the main body that regulates the activities, curriculum and examinations of the college that lead to the award of professional licensing. The council's mandate is derived from part III of the Health Professions Regulatory Bodies Act 2013 (Act 857). Until the passage of this Act, the council operated under NRCD 117 of 1972 and LI 683.

== Academics ==
There are two main programmes run at NMTC Korle-Bu, namely the Registered General Nursing (RGN) programme and the Registered Midwifery (RM) programme. There are various departments under each faculty.

The departments under the RGN programme include:

- Medical-Surgical Nursing
- Public Health Nursing
- Obstetrics Nursing
- Paediatrics Nursing
- Psychiatric Nursing and
- Allied Nursing

The departments under the RM programme include:

- Obstetric Nursing
- Medical-Surgical Nursing
- Neonatal paediatric Nursing
- Family Planning
- Prenatal Nursing
- Labour
- Puerperium and
- Allied Midwifery

=== RGN programme ===
NMTC Korle-Bu's curriculum has continued to evolve in response to the changing health needs of society. The RGN programme is for six semesters, leading to the award of a Diploma in Registered General Nursing.

The programme demands a continuous assessment of students throughout the semesters. Students are assessed on their performance in class tests, mid-semester and end of semester examinations in both theory and clinical practice.

=== RM programme ===
The Registered Midwifery Programme is a Diploma Programme open only to female students. The RM programme is arranged semester by semester. It is also a six-semester course structure.

== Goal ==
The goal of the college is to produce qualified professionals through excellent teaching, research, and the dissemination of knowledge.

== History ==
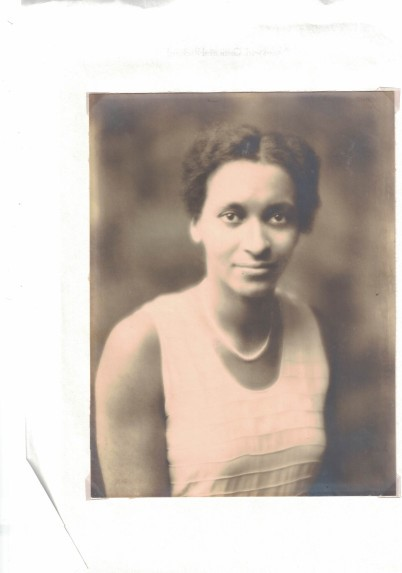
Agnes Yewande Savage (1906–1964)

The Nursing and Midwifery Training College, Korle Bu, is the premier institution in Ghana for nursing education and was established in 1945. Agnes Yewande Savage, the first West African woman medical doctor, supervised the establishment of the Nurses' Training School at Korle Bu, where a nurses’ ward is named after her. The college's first batch of trained midwives took their final examination in 1930.

Until January 2, 2008, NMTC Korle-Bu operated as separate training institutions, that is, Nurses’ Training College and Midwifery Training School, with two principals. On January 2, 2008, in line with a Ministry of Health Policy, the two institutions were merged with one principal as the administrative head.
