= Ofori Panyin I =

Ghanaian ruler

Ofori Panyin I is commonly known as the founder of the Akyem State, afterwards Kyebi located in the valley of the Birim river after 1727. He ruled from 1704 to 1727.
