= Okyenhene =

Title of a tribal king in Eastern Region of Ghana

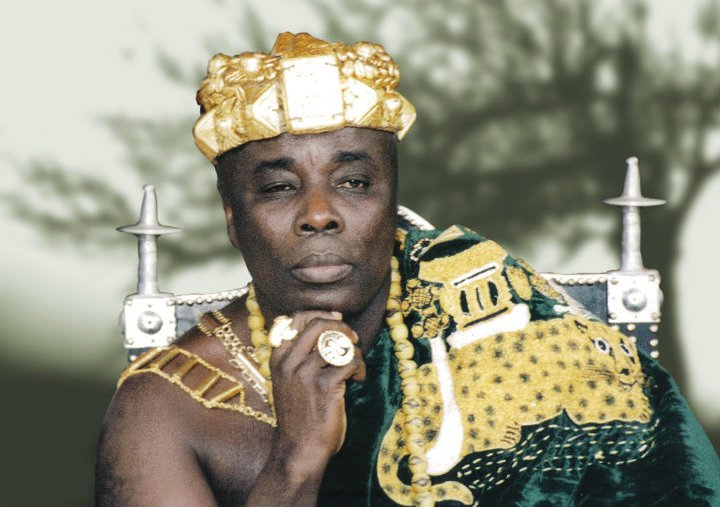
Osagyefuo Amoatia Ofori Panin is the reigning king Akyem Abuakwa

Okyenhene is the title of the tribal king of Akyem Abuakwa (also styled Okyeman), an old traditional kingdom in the Eastern Region of Ghana. The Okyenhene is also referred to as the Kwaebibiremhene as his traditional territory is an area of a dense forest. Again, the Okyenhene is considered the head of the Asona clan (Asona Piesie). Asona is the largest of the clans of the Akans, which include the Oyoko, Aduana, Agona, Asakyire, Bretuo and Ekuona, among others.

The role of Okyenhene is not hereditary, as a new Okeynhene is elected by a council.

On the death of an Okyenhene, it is mandatory for all Asona chiefs in Ghana to partake in the royal burial dubbed "doteyie" and funeral also called "Odupon ayie". These ceremonies normally lasts seven days each. The Okyenhene's stool is called the Ofori Panin stool. He presides over his territory through his divisional chiefs as well as other chiefs.

The current Okyenhene, Osagyefuo Amoatia Ofori Panin II ascended the Okyeman Ofori Panin stool on 4 October 1999, after the death of his predecessor Osagyefuo Kuntunkununku II. He is the 35th Paramount Chief to ascend the stool.
