= William Ofori Atta =

Ghanaian politician (1910–1988)

Nana William Ofori Atta

15th Minister for Foreign Affairs (Ghana)
- In office 1971 – 12 January 1972
- Preceded by: Victor Owusu
- Succeeded by: Maj. Gen. Nathan A. Aferi

Minister for Education, Culture and Sports
- In office 1969–1971

Personal details
- Born: 10 October 1910 Kibi, Gold Coast
- Died: 14 July 1988 (aged 77) Ghana
- Party: Progress Party (1969–1972); United National Convention (1979–1981)
- Parent: Ofori Atta I
- Relatives: Kofi Asante Ofori-Atta (brother); Susan Ofori-Atta (sister); Adeline Akufo-Addo (sister); Kwesi Amoako-Atta (brother); Jones Ofori Atta (brother)
- Education: Mfantsipim School; Achimota School; Queens' College, Cambridge
- Occupation: Lawyer
- Nickname: Paa Willie

William Ofori Atta (10 October 1910 – 14 July 1988), popularly called "Paa Willie", was a Ghanaian founding member of the United Gold Coast Convention (UGCC) and one of the founding fathers of Ghana as one of "The Big Six" detained by the British colonial government in the then Gold Coast. He later became a Minister for Foreign Affairs in Ghana's second republic between 1971 and 1972.

== Early life ==
Nana William Ofori Atta was born at Kyebi and was the son of Nana Sir Ofori Atta I who was the Omanhene (King) of Akyem Abuakwa between 1912 and 1943. He was thus a nobleman of royal lineage of the Ofori-Atta dynasty, although the fact that the Akan people (to which he belonged) are traditionally matrilineal meant that he was not a dynastic prince. William Ofori Atta attended Mfantsipim School, but was withdrawn by the school to Achimota School where he was among the first batch of students to sit for the Cambridge School Certificate. Some of his school mates included Komla Agbeli Gbedemah and Edward Akufo-Addo. His batch of students also pioneered the intermediate degree programs. He was also the first ever school prefect of the School. This arrangements went on to form the nucleus of the University of Ghana. He attended Queens' College, University of Cambridge from 1935 to 1938. He became a lawyer in 1956. His sister was Susan Ofori-Atta, the first Ghanaian woman to become a physician.

== Politics ==
William Ofori Atta was a founding member of the United Gold Coast Convention after joining in 1947. He won one of the Akim Abuakwa seats during the 1951 Gold Coast election. He later became the leader of the United Party in opposition to Dr Kwame Nkrumah. Ofori Atta was detained by Nkrumah during the first republic under the Preventive Detention Act. During the second republic, he represented the people of Akwatia as a member of the 1st Parliament of the Second Republic, he was also the Minister for Education and then Minister for Foreign Affairs in the Progress Party government of Dr. Busia. He was an active member of the People's Movement for Freedom and Justice (PMFJ) which campaigned against the 'Union Government' concept by General I. K. Acheampong, then Head of state of Ghana and Chairman of the Supreme Military Council (SMC). This was an attempt by the military regime to extend military rule instead of handing back power to civilians. After the fall of the SMC, he stood for president in the 1979 Ghanaian presidential election on the ticket of the United National Convention coming third with 17.41 per cent of the popular vote. Eventually, he became chairman of the Council of State for the Third Republic. He also pushed for a number of economic policy guidelines with a singular aim; "ensuring the development of a strong nation and a modern economy where citizens live in dignity". For him, the cornerstone of Ghana's economic policy lay in transformation of the agriculture sector into highly productive and profitable enterprise that would provide a foundation for an expansive industrial programmes.

== Later life ==
William Ofori Atta became a devout Christian and played various roles in Christian circles. He was one of the founders of the Accra Chapel Trust, (now the Korle-Bu Community Chapel) an independent evangelical church at the Korle Bu Teaching Hospital in Accra in 1967. Ofori Atta delivered the J. B. Danquah Memorial Lectures organised by the Ghana Academy of Arts and Sciences in 1985. His topic was – "Ghana, A Nation in Crisis". He died in 1988 and was given a state burial.

== William Ofori-Atta Memorial Lectures ==
The William Ofori-Atta Memorial Lectures were instituted in his memory after his death.

== Literature ==
- Sawyerr, Harry, William Ofori Atta, 1979
- Ghana, a Nation in Crisis
- The vision of an independent State of Ghana

== See also ==
- The Big Six
- Minister for Foreign Affairs (Ghana)
- United Gold Coast Convention

== Publications ==
- Jenkins, Ray (1994). "William Ofori Atta, Nnambi Azikiwe, J.B. Danquah and the "Grilling" of W.E.F. Ward of Achimota in 1935". History in Africa. 21 (January): 171–189. doi:10.2307/3171885. JSTOR 3171885. S2CID 155396169.

Political offices
Preceded by ?	Minister for Education, Culture and Sports; 1970–1971	Succeeded by R. R. Amponsah
Preceded by Victor Owusu	Foreign Minister; 1971–1972	Succeeded by Nathan Apea Aferi
Party political offices
New title	Leader of the United Party ? – ?	Succeeded by ?
New title	United National Convention presidential nominee 1979	Succeeded by parties banned
