= Minister for Finance and Economic Planning =

Finance minister of Ghana

The Minister for Finance and Economic Planning is the Ghanaian government official responsible for the Ministry of Finance of Ghana. The Minister for Finance since January 2025 is Cassiel Ato Forson. Kwesi Botchwey stayed in office the longest (1982 to 1995), first under Jerry Rawlings as Secretary for Finance in the PNDC military government and then as Minister for Finance in the constitutionally elected Rawlings government at the beginning of the Fourth Republic and was in charge of the Economic Recovery Programme under the auspices of the World Bank which oversaw major economic reform in Ghana.

== List of ministers ==
The first Ghanaian to head this ministry is Komla Agbeli Gbedemah who assumed this position in 1954 when the Britain allowed Kwame Nkrumah to form a government prior to gaining full independence in 1957. The Ministry has at various times been designated as Ministry of Finance or as it is currently, the Ministry of Finance and Economic Planning.

Number	Minister	Took office	Left office	Government	Party
1	Komla Agbeli Gbedemah (MP) (First Ghanaian in this position)	1954	1957	Colonial government	Convention People's Party
1	Komla Agbeli Gbedemah (MP) (First Ghanaian in this position)	1957	1961	Nkrumah government	Convention People's Party
2	Ferdinand Koblavi Dra Goka (MP)	8 May 1961	1964	Nkrumah government	Convention People's Party
3	Kwesi Amoako-Atta (MP)	1964	1966	Nkrumah government	Convention People's Party
4	Akwasi Afrifa; Emmanuel Noi Omaboe	1966	1969	National Liberation Council	Military government
5	Joseph Henry Mensah (MP)	1969	1972	Busia government	Progress Party (Ghana)
6	Ignatius Kutu Acheampong	1972	?	National Redemption Council	Military government
7	Amon Nikoi	?	?	National Redemption Council	Military government
8	Robert K. A. Gardiner	14 October 1975	May 1978	Supreme Military Council	Military government
9	J. L. S. Abbey	?	1979	Supreme Military Council	Military government
9	J. L. S. Abbey	1979	1979	Armed Forces Revolutionary Council	Military government
10	Amon Nikoi	1979	1981	Limann government	People's National Party
11	George Benneh	1981	1981	Limann government	People's National Party
12	Kwesi Botchwey^{a}	1982	1993	Provisional National Defence Council	Military government
12	Kwesi Botchwey^{a}	1993	1995	Rawlings government	National Democratic Congress
13	Richard Kwame Peprah	1995	2001	Rawlings government	National Democratic Congress
14	Yaw Osafo-Maafo	2001	2005	Kufuor government	New Patriotic Party
15	Kwadwo Baah Wiredu	2005	2007	Kufuor government	New Patriotic Party
16	Anthony Akoto Osei	2007	2009	Kufuor government	New Patriotic Party
17	Kwabena Duffuor	2009	2012	Mills government	National Democratic Congress
17	Kwabena Duffuor	2012	2013	Mahama government	National Democratic Congress
18	Seth Terkper	2013	6 January 2017	Mahama government	National Democratic Congress
19	Ken Ofori-Atta	27 January 2017	February 2024	Akufo-Addo government	New Patriotic Party
20	Mohammed Amin Adam	February 2024	6 January 2025	Akufo-Addo government	New Patriotic Party
21	Cassiel Ato Forson (MP)	22 January 2025	Incumbent	Mahama 2nd government	National Democratic Congress

== See also ==
- Ministry of Finance and Economic Planning (Ghana)

== Notes ==
^a - Kwesi Botchway has been the longest serving Finance Minister. He served from 1982 to 1993 under the PNDC government and from 1993 to 1995 in the same portfolio under the NDC government under Jerry Rawlings. In all he served a total of 13 years.
