= Osagyefuo Amoatia Ofori Panin =

Paramount Chief of Akyem Abuakwa

Osagyefuo Amoatia Ofori Panin is the 35th King of Akyem Abuakwa, also called Okeyman, in the Eastern Region of Ghana. He was enstooled on October 4, 1999, succeeding his brother, Osagyefo Kuntukunuku II. He is also the 35th occupant of the Ofori Panin Stool. October 2019 marked 20 years of his reign, which was celebrated in a glamorous style.
