= Kibi, Ghana =

Kibi Kyebi
- Town
- Location of Kibi in Eastern Region
- Coordinates: 06°10′N 00°33′W
- Country: Ghana
- Region: Eastern Region
- District: East Akim Municipal
- Elevation: 318 m (1,043 ft)

Population (2013)
  - Total: 11,677
- Time zone: GMT
  - Summer (DST): GMT

Kibi or Kyebi is a town located in the East Akim Municipal District, Eastern Region of Ghana. Its population is 11,677 people as of 2013.

== History ==
Kibi is the traditional capital of the Akyem Abuakwa state in the Eastern region of Ghana (also known as Okyeman). The Ofori Panin paramount stool, the traditional seat of the Okyenhene, is located in Kibi.

== Transport ==
The Kibi railway station serves Kibi a short distance on the Ghana rail transport network.

== Education ==
Kibi has a number of educational institutions from primary education to higher education, as well as a school for the deaf, which was founded in 1975 and had 213 students by 2008.

== Economy ==
Tarkwaian rocks, a major source of gold, have been found near Kibi. Several mining companies, including Paramount Mining Corporation, have been exploring their potential. RUSAL, a major Russian Aluminium corporation, applied to the Ghana Minerals Commission and the Ghana Integrated Aluminium Industry Committee for permission to explore the Ghana bauxite deposits near Kibi. The town is known for a high volume of galamsey activities, which eventually caused contamination of the Birim River.

== Notable people ==
- Abedi Pele
- Nana Akufo-Addo, President of Ghana
- André Ayew
- Jordan Ayew
- Nana Asante Bediatuo
- Osagyefuo Amoatia Ofori Panin
- Kofi Asante Ofori-Atta, former Attorney General and Speaker of Parliament
- William Ofori-Atta, former Foreign Minister, Former Minister of Education, and Former Chairman of Council Of State
- Jones Ofori-Atta, former Deputy Finance Minister
- Kwesi Amoako-Atta, first Black Deputy Governor of Bank of Ghana and former Finance Minister of Ghana
- Susan Ofori-Atta, first female medical doctor in Ghana
- S.S. Omane, former Inspector General of Police, IGP
- Samuel Atta Akyea, MP for Akyem Abuakwa South
- Ofori-Atta I

== See also ==
- Railway stations in Ghana
