= Akyem Abuakwa =

Traditional kingdom in Ghana

- Status: State until 1852; Now a non-sovereign monarchy within Ghana
- Common languages: Akan (Twi)
- Government: Monarchy
- History
  - Conquest of Akwamu: 1730
  - Incorporated into the Gold Coast Colony: 1852

Akyem Abuakwa is a traditional kingdom in Ghana. It dates from at least the 16th century. Its capital is and was Kyebi. Currently, it is a non-sovereign monarchy and part of Ghana, one of the three Akyem states, the others being Akyem Kotoku and Akyem Bosome. Historically, the Akyem were part of the Adansi Kingdom, which was the first nation to build buildings out of mud. They were therefore named Adansi (builders). In the 18th century, the Ashanti Empire emerged, and under the leadership of King Osei Tutu, defeated the Adansi and annexed them into the Ashanti Empire. The three Akyem nations that were part of the Adansi Kingdom seceded and crossed the River Pra.

== History ==
According to tradition, the founder of the kingdom migrated from Adansi. By the seventeenth century Akyem Abuakwa dominated the trade routes and gold-producing districts around the Birim River, and developed into a large, wealthy, powerful kingdom.

King Tutu I decided to pursue the Akyems across River Pra against the advice of Okomfo Anokye. While crossing the river with his army, he was shot by the Akyems in an ambush. He was killed and fell into the river. The Ashantis say "Meka Yawada" which means "I swear by Thursday" because the day the king died was on Thursday and the Akyems were known as "Abuakwanfo" or "Abuakwafo" (guerrilla fighters). The Ashantis retreated and this defeat created a taboo preventing any Ashanti King up to the time of Nana Prempeh I (in 1900) to cross the Pra to the south.

After his death, his nephew King Opoku Ware I became the king of the Ashanti Empire and vowed to avenge his uncle's death. He restarted the war against the Akyems. The Akyems, knowing that the Ashantis would invade again, migrated southeastwards. Because of the travel, most of the Kotokus and some others settled in the present-day Ashanti Akyem region. The majority traveled until they met Akwamus, a powerful nation inhabiting and ruling the tribes from Asamankese to Nyanawase, which was then their capital and part of Akwapim. The Abuakwas fought the Akwamus and settled in the area of the Akwamus. The Abukawas made temporary capitals in several areas, including Praso, before settling at Pameng. In the reign of King Ofori Panin the capital was moved to Kyebirie. The Abuakwas fought few battles with their rival tribes and were an independent state until in 1852, the Abuakwas surrendered to the British Empire and they became a British administrative region.

== See also ==
- Akan people
- List of rulers of the Akan state of Akyem Abuakwa
- Rulers of Ghana
- Gold Coast region
