= List of Ghanaian politicians =

The following is a list of Ghanaian politicians, both past and present.

== A ==
- Abavana, Lawrence Rosario
- Abdulai, Mohammed Mubarak see below Ras Mubarak
- Albert Abongo
- Acheampong, Ignatius Kutu
- Addy, Mark Diamond
- Aferi, Nathan Apea
- Aggudey, George
- Ahwoi, Kwamena
- Aidoo, Joseph
- Ako-Adjei, Ebenezer
- Akuffo, Fred
- Akufo-Addo, Nana Addo Dankwa
- Afrifa, Akwasi
- Amofa, Owuraku
- Ampaw, Gibson Dokyi
- Amponsah, Reginald Reynolds
- Anin, Patrick Dankwa
- Ankrah, Joseph Arthur
- Annan, Daniel Francis
- Annan, Kofi
- Arkaah, Kow Nkensen
- Asamoah, Obed
- Atta-Mills, John
- Awoonor-Williams, R.A.
- Ayannah, Alhaji
- Amoako, Richard Nana
- Anbataayela Bernard Mornah

== B ==
- Baffour, R.P.
- Baah, Kwame, R.M.
- Barima, Yaw
- Sabah Zita Benson
- Bernasko, Frank
- Bilson, John
- Boafo, Sampson
- Boahen, Albert Adu
- Boateng, Kwaku
- Botsio, Kojo
- Busia, Kofi Abrefa
- Botchway, Bright

== C ==
- Casely-Hayford, Archie
- Casely-Hayford, J. E.
- Chinebuah, Isaac

== D ==
- Delle Nminyem Edmund
- Danquah, Joseph Boakye (J.B.)
- Darko, Kwabena
- Dery, Ambrose
- Dombo, Simon Diedong
- Dzamesi, Kofi

== E ==
- Edumadze, Isaac
- Egala, Imoru
- Erskine, Emmanuel
- Esseku, Haruna

== F ==
- Felli, Roger

== G ==
- Gambila, Boniface
- Gbedemah, Komla Agbeli
- Gbeho, James Victor
- Grant, A. G. ("Paa")

== H ==
- Hagan, George
- Harlley, J.W.K.
- Casely-Hayford, Joseph

== J ==
- Jantuah, Franklin Adubobi
- Jantuah, Kwame Sanaa-Poku
- Johnson, Joseph W.S. de Graft

== K ==
- Kufuor, John Agyekum

== L ==
- Lartey, Daniel Augustus
- Limann, Hilla

== M ==
- Mahama, Aliu
- Mahama, Edward
- Mahama, Ibrahim
- Mate Kole, Emmanuel
- Mensah, James Van Leuven
- Mensah Sarbah, John
- Muntaka, Mohammed Mubarak
- Michael, Kwame Kissi

== N ==
- Nikoi, Gloria Amon
- Nkrumah, Kwame
- Nyanteh, Kwame
- Nyanteh, Larbi Kwame

== O ==
- Obetsebi-Lamptey, Emmanuel
- Obetsebi-Lamptey, Jake
- Ofori-Atta, William
- Ollennu, Nii Amaa
- Owusu, Victor
- Owusu-Agyeman, Hackman
- Owusu-Yaw, Joseph

== Q ==
- Quaison-Sackey, Alex
- Quaye, Sheikh I. C.

== R ==
- Rawlings, Jerry John
- Ras Mubarak

== S ==
- Saddique, Boniface
- Safo-Adu, Kwame
- Seinti, Nana Kwadwo
- Spio-Garbrah, Ekwow

== T ==
- Tanoh, Augustus Obuadum "Goosie"
- Terlabi, Ebenezer Okletey

== V ==
- Vanderpuije, Alfred
- Vanderpuye, Edwin Nii Lante
- Vanderpuye, Isaac Nii Djanmah

== W ==
- Welbeck, Nathaniel Azarco
- Wereko-Brobby, Charles

== Y ==
- Yahaya, Moses Amadu
- Tali, Yakubu
