= Kwabena Darko =

Entrepreneur, minister of religion and former politician

- Born: 23 October 1942 (age 83); Bekwai, Ghana
- Education: Agriculturist
- Occupation: Entrepreneur
- Spouse: Christiana Darko
- Children: 6

Kwabena Darko (born 23 October 1942) is an entrepreneur, minister of religion and former politician. He owns the largest privately owned agro-industrial concern in Ghana and is listed in “Who’s Who in World Poultry”. Darko is also known by many in the sub-region as the “Poultry King” and "Akokɔ Darko" (meaning "Poultry Darko" in Akan).

== Early life ==
Kwabena Darko was born on 23 October 1942 at Bekwai, in the Ashanti Region of Ghana. He lost his father at an early age and had to engage in petty trading to supplement the family income. He ended up in part-time education in order to devote more time to trading because of the family's financial circumstances. His mother later remarried the owner of a small chicken farm. Kwabena Darko quickly learnt the running of the farm and was an able assistant to his stepfather. He proceeded to Israel, where he studied agriculture at the Ruppin Institute, specialising in poultry science in the late 1950s and early sixties.

== Career ==
On his return to Ghana, Kwabena Darko worked with the Ghana State Farms Corporation. After 6 months, he resigned and joined his stepfather, who was now into commercial poultry farming. The farm expanded from 5,000 birds to 100,000 birds for egg laying within two years. He started his own poultry farm, Darko Farms and Company in April 1967.

== Politics ==
Kwabena Darko who describes himself as Nkrumahist run for president in the 1992 election on the ticket of the National Independence Party with Naa Afarley Sackeyfio as the running mate. He came 4th with 2.8 per cent of the total votes cast. The election was won by Jerry Rawlings of the National Democratic Congress, who reportedly said that "people should not buy chicken from Darko Farms, because if they did I would get money for politics".

== Christianity ==
Darko was reportedly a Christian from the age of about 16 years. Between 1965 and 1996, he was a deacon (Elder) with the Assemblies of God Church. He went on to hold other positions in the church. He has been the International Vice-President of the Full Gospel Businessmen's Fellowship International (FGBMFI), (Africa), an international Christian network, from 1990 to 1995. He became the General Overseer for the Oasis of Love International Church since 1996. he was ordained as a minister of religion in 2000.

== Family ==
Kwabena Darko is married to Rev. Dr. Christiana Darko, a director of the Darko Farms and Company Limited as well as the International Outreach Director for West Africa of The Women’s Aglow Fellowship International. They have six children, Sam, Vernon, Jonathan, Maxine, Mercy and Bernice. The first three are actively involved in running the company.

== Positions currently held ==
- Chairman and Chief Executive Officer, Darko Farms and Company Limited - 1969–present
- Chancellor, Regent University College of Science and Technology - 2003–present
- Member, Nominating Committee of the African Prize for Leadership 1994–Present
- International Secretary, FGBMFI, Costa Mesa, U.S. 1994–Present
- General Overseer, The Oasis of Love International Church - 1996–Present
- Board Member, Oasis International Training Center - 2000–Present
- External Board Member, The Bank of Ghana - 2001–Present
- Chairman, Sinapi Aba Trust - 1994–Present

== Honours ==
- Grand Medal Order of the Volta, National Award for his Contributions to Agriculture - 1978
- Honorary Certificate for Selfless Devotion to Charity by Christian Voluntary Society - 1978
- Award by Ghana Animal Science Association for Outstanding Contribution to the Association - 1982
- Best Farmer Award, Royal Agriculture Show, London - 1984
- Honorary Member, Ghana Science Association - 1985
- National Best Poultry Farmer - 1986
- Meritorious Award for Contribution to Charity by the Ghana National Trust Fund - 1990
- Certificate of Honor for Voluntary Service and Contribution to Charity by the Department of Social Welfare and Community Development - 1990
- The First General Superintendent Certificate of Honor Assemblies of God Ghana - 1990
- Certificate of Honor for Outstanding Contribution to the Ghana Feed Millers Association - 1992
- Junior Achievement of Ghana Business Hall of Fame - 1992
- Ordained as a Minister of religion - 2000
- Honorary Doctorate of Science Degree by KNUST - 2002
- Honorary Doctorate of Divinity by Global Missions and Bible College, London - 2002

== See also ==
- List of Ghanaian politicians
- National Independence Party

Business positions
New title	Chairman and Chief Executive Officer, Darko Farms and Company Limited; 1969 – present	Incumbent
Party political offices
Preceded by New party	Leader of the National Independence Party; 1992 – 1993	Succeeded by Party merged with People's Heritage Party to form People's Convention Party
