= George Hagan (politician) =

Ghanaian politician and academic

George Panyin Hagan

Convention People's Party candidate for President of Ghana
- Election date December 7, 2000
- Opponent(s): John Kufuor, John Atta Mills and others
- Incumbent: Jerry Rawlings

Personal details
- Born: 1938 (age 87–88) Accra, Gold Coast
- Party: Convention People's Party
- Other political affiliations: People's Convention Party; National Independence Party
- Spouse: Dr. Maria Hagan
- Children: 3
- Education: University of Ghana (BA, MA); University of Oxford (DPhil)
- Occupation: Academic

Professor George Panyin Hagan (born 1938), is a prominent academic and politician in Ghana.

== Early life and education ==
George Hagan was born in Accra in 1938. He had his basic education in Accra, Koforidua, Sekondi and Kumasi because his parents, civil servants, were being transferred. His secondary education was at St Thomas Aquinas Secondary School in Cantonments, a suburb of Accra and sixth form (college) at St. Augustine's College at Cape Coast. He proceeded to the University of Ghana, Legon, where he obtained a Bachelor of Arts (Honours) degree in Philosophy and later a Master of Arts degree in Philosophy as well. He proceeded to the United Kingdom where he obtained a DPhil in Social Anthropology from Oxford University.

== Career ==
He first worked at the Scholarship Secretariat in Ghana as a Welfare Officer between 1962 and 1964. In 1968, he became a Lecturer and Research Fellow at the Institute of African Studies of the University of Ghana. He rose to become associate professor in 1994 and the Director of the Institute in the 1997/1998 academic year. He has served on many committees within the university as well as in outside institutions such as member of the Board of Directors, State Construction Corporation, Chairman of the Academic Committee of National Film and Television Institute (NAFTI) and member of the Board of Governors of Aquinas and St. Augustine Secondary Schools. He is the Chairman of the Ghana National Commission on Culture and chairman of the Board of Directors of the Electricity Corporation of Ghana (ECG).

== Politics ==
Prof. Hagan was involved with the CPP from the days of Kwame Nkrumah in the mid-1960s. He was also a member of the National Alliance of Liberals in the Second Republic and a Standing Committee member of the Action Congress Party in the Third Republic. He was the Presidential aspirant for the National Independence Party for the 1992 presidential election. He was a member of the People's Convention Party PCP Team for Unity Talks with the National Convention Party NCP and the People's National Convention PNC which led to the reformation of the CPP in 1996.

George Hagan was the presidential candidate for the CPP in the 2000 elections. He won 1.78% of the votes, coming fourth in the first round of the election, thereby missing the cut for the second round.

== Family ==
George Hagan is married to Dr Maria Hagan, the Director of the National Eye Care Programme in Ghana. They have three children.

== Publication ==
- Hagan, George P. Nkrumah's Cultural Policy, University of Ghana, Legon, 1985.

== Notes ==
Party political offices
| New title | National Independence Party Presidential Candidate; 1992 | Succeeded by ? |
| Preceded by Kow Nkensen Arkaah | Convention People's Party Presidential Candidate; 2000 | Succeeded by George Aggudey |
