= Charles Adu Boahen =

Ghanaian politician and public servant

Charles K. Adu Boahen

Deputy Minister of State for Finance
- In office March 2017 – 14 November 2022
- President: Nana Akuffo-Addo
- Preceded by: Cassiel Ato Forson

Personal details
- Born: Ghana
- Party: New Patriotic Party
- Relations: Kwabena Boahen (brother)
- Parent: Albert Adu Boahen (father)
- Education: Harvard Business School, University of Southern California, Mfantsipim School, Achimota School
- Portfolio: Finance

Charles Kofi Adu Boahen (born May 1970) is a Ghanaian investment banker, businessman, politician and public servant. He served as a Deputy Minister of Finance and then Minister of State at the Finance Ministry in the government of President Nana Akufo-Addo between 2017 and 2022. He is a member of the New Patriotic Party. Adu Boahen is the son of Mrs Jane Thyra Adu Boahen and Prof. Albert Adu Boahen, an academic, historian and politician who became the New Patriotic Party's flagbearer in the 1992 Ghanaian general elections.

Prior to his stint in government, Adu Boahen had a 20 year career in private sector corporate finance, private equity and asset management commencing on New York's Wall Street, then on to Lagos, Nigeria and Johannesburg, South Africa. After leaving his government role in November 2022, he has since returned to private business.

== Early life and education ==
Adu Boahen was born in Accra to a middle class family. His father Albert Adu Boahen was then a professor of history at the University of Ghana, and his mother Jane Thyra Boahen worked at the Bank of Ghana. He has 4 siblings including Kwabena Boahen, a professor of biomedical engineering at Stanford. A brilliant student, he was educated at Ghana's Achimota School, where he obtained his 'O' Levels, and Mfantsipim School, where he did his 'A' Levels.

After completing his secondary school education in Ghana, he proceeded to the United States, where he earned his undergraduate BSc in chemical engineering from the University of Southern California. While an undergrad, Adu Boahen quickly realised he would not enjoy working as a full-time scientist. He won a summer internship at the Wall Street bank Salomon Smith Barney via the competitive Sponsors for Educational Opportunity (SEO), a mentoring programme which helps deserving students get internships and other opportunities. Having impressed during his internship, he was offered a job, and upon graduating from USC he moved to New York to commence his career at Salomon Smith Barney in the investment banking division, with a focus on the chemicals and energy sectors. He worked there for a few years before taking a brief career break to earn an MBA from Harvard Business School.

== Career ==
Hon. Charles Kofi Adu Boahen has over 19 years of private sector experience in Finance, specifically in Corporate Finance, Investment Banking, Asset Management and Private Equity.

After school, he worked with companies such as investment bank Salomon Smith Barney which is now part of Citigroup on Wall Street, and then later the $400mm AIG African Infrastructure Fund as an investment officer. At Salomon he was a member of their Investment Banking Division where his responsibilities included various corporate finance and mergers & acquisitions assignments, primarily in the Chemicals and Energy sector. After AIG he joined the investment bank JP Morgan as Vice President in charge of Investment Banking for Sub-Saharan Africa with the exception of South Africa. He was during this period also the Senior Country Representative at JP Morgan, Nigeria. After 5 years with JP Morgan he left to take up a role as Director and Regional Head of Corporate & Investment Banking for Standard Bank of South Africa, working out of Johannesburg.

Moving back to Ghana, he founded his firm, Black Star Advisors (BSA) in 2007. Black Star Advisors is a boutique investment bank and asset management firm. He also founded Primrose Properties Ghana, a real estate development company which has completed a number of projects including Primrose Place and Ghacem Towers. He resigned from the board and management of his private companies in 2017 in order to take up a role in Ghana's government as a Deputy Minister of Finance.

In January 2023, his company Black Star Brokerage's certification to operate as a foreign exchange broker by the Bank of Ghana was renewed.

=== Political career ===
More of a technocrat than a politician, Adu Boahen joined the government as Deputy Finance Minister responsible for Finance in the Nana Akufo-Addo administration in April 2017, a position he held for 4 years until he was elevated by the president to the position of Minister of State at the Finance Ministry. Formerly a dual citizen of Ghana and the USA, he stated during his initial vetting process with the Appointments Committee of Ghana's Parliament that he had relinquished his US citizenship in order to comply with the requirements of Ghana's laws governing certain government appointees. Following a second vetting for his elevated role, Parliament approved his nomination as Minister of State at the Finance Ministry in June 2021.

In his role as Deputy Minister, Adu Boahen assisted the Minister for Finance in executing his mandate with a specific focus on Finance and External Resource mobilization. As a Minister of State his oversight responsibilities were expanded to include Budget in addition to the Finance and External Resource Mobilization Portfolios and attending Cabinet meetings on behalf of the Minister.

== Controversy ==
In June 2021 Ghana's Ministry of Finance put out a press release defending against charges of "reckless borrowing" on social media and among sections of the Ghanaian public by stating that "any borrowing by MoF is strictly determined by the deficit target for the year as approved by parliament, the appropriation bill and maturities falling due during the year. In fact, this govt has demonstrated exceptional fiscal discipline evidenced by the fiscal deficit below 5% prior to COVID despite the financial sector bail out costs [including the repayment of depositor’s funds] and the energy sector excess capacity charges which have to be paid."

On November 14, 2022, after excerpts of an expose by controversial Ghanaian investigative journalist Anas Aremeyaw Anas were released by the New Crusading Guide newspaper, Adu Boahen released a statement addressing and denying allegations contained in the expose and announcing that he had submitted his resignation so as not to "be a distraction" while investigations were concluded. Later that day, the president of the Republic of Ghana removed him from his position as minister of state at the Finance Ministry on account of allegations of corruption in the documentary which was titled "Galamsey Economy" in Ghana. He was not charged.

These events occurred in the midst of various agitations by MPs of the governing New Patriotic Party demanding that the Finance Minister Ken Ofori-Atta, a cousin of President Nana Akuffo-Addo, be sacked. Subsequent to this, Adu Boahen continued to serve on the Bank of Ghana board as a director from the finance ministry for a period of time, according to the 2022 BOG report.

In 2023 after an investigation, the Office of the Special Prosecutor reported there was no criminal activity into corruption allegations brought against Adu Boahen and so cleared him of all charges.

== Philanthropy ==
Adu Boahen and his siblings set up the Adu Boahen Foundation in memory of their late father, notable Ghanaian historian and politician Prof. Albert Adu Boahen. Working with academics such as its eventual Founding Curator Dr. Victoria Ellen Smith and other stakeholders at the University of Ghana, the Foundation built and handed over a library to the University's History Department. It was formally opened in June 2023.

The library, named the Adu Boahen Memorial Library and Archive, also houses thousands of books and academic writings from the personal collection of the late Professor which were donated by his family in accordance with his will. It has as its stated aim to "inspire all scholars and students of African history to employ empirical research methods and appropriate theory to critically analyse Africa’s past and create narratives that are detailed, accurate and true", and "encourage research that recognises Africa’s ancient origins and complex civilisations; that explores Africans’ responses to colonial rule and the influence of Africans on the wider world; and that evaluates modern history so as to nurture a sense of national pride for the betterment of Ghana and the continent as a whole", among other things.

Adu Boahen has been involved in numerous other philanthropic initiatives largely focused on education and art, such as helping fund tuition and accommodation fees for an aspiring medical student whose plight was highlighted in the Ghanaian media and the Kuenyehia Trust for Contemporary Art. He and his brother Prof Kwabena Boahen further funded the conversion of a school building at Mfantsipim School in Cape Coast from a library to a conference room via the Adu Boahen Foundation in honour of their father. The building was publicly commissioned by the headmaster on 6 October 2022. Along with other alumni from his alma mater Achimota school, Adu Boahen supports a scholarship programme for students of the school who have been accepted into tertiary institutions in Ghana but cannot otherwise afford to go.
