= Boahen =

Boahen is a surname. Notable people with the surname include:

- Albert Adu Boahen (1932–2006), Ghanaian academic, historian and politician
- Joseph Boahen Aidoo (or Joseph Aidoo), Ghanaian politician
- Kwabena Boahen (born 1964), American academic
- Kwadwo Boahen (born 2000), Canadian football player
