= Roland Issifu Alhassan =

Ghanaian politician and diplomat

Ghanaian ambassador to Germany
- In office 2001 – September 2006
- Preceded by: George Robert Nipah
- Succeeded by: es:Grant Ohemeng Kesse

Personal details
- Born: September 15, 1935
- Died: April 14, 2014 (aged 78)

Alhaji Roland Issifu Alhassan (September 15, 1935 – April 14, 2014) was a Ghanaian politician, lawyer and diplomat. Alhassan was a founding member of the New Patriotic Party (NPP), specifically in the country's Northern Region.

== Career ==
Alhassan was a commercial farmer who cultivated rice and maize.

== Political career ==
He served as an MP for Tolon-Kumbungu from 1969 to 1972 and 1979–1981. In 1992, Alhassan was a candidate for Vice President of Ghana as the running mate of presidential hopeful, Albert Adu Boahen. He also served as Ghana's ambassador to Germany from 2001 to 2006 during the administration of former President John Kufuor.

In addition to his political career, Alhassan was also the first person from Northern Ghana to be called to the Bar and become a lawyer.

== Personal life ==
He was married to Mrs. Jane Alhassan and they had six children. He was an Islamic Scholar.

== Honor ==
Alhassan received the Order of the Volta for his service to Ghana in 2008.

== Death ==
Roland Issifu Alhassan died from a short illness at 37 Military Hospital in Accra, Ghana, on 14 April 2014. He died aged 87. He was buried in his hometown of Kumbungu, Tolon-Kumbungu District, Northern Region.
