= Botchway =

Botchway is a surname. Notable people with the surname include:

- Bright Botchway (born 1985), Ghanaian political figure and entrepreneur
- Frederick Ansah Botchway (born 1996), Ghanaian footballer
- Shirley Ayorkor Botchwey (born 1963), Ghanaian politician, diplomat and lawyer
