= 2011 New Patriotic Party primary elections =

The 2011 New Patriotic Party constituency primaries was a nationwide election organised by the Electoral Commission of Ghana at the request of the New Patriotic Party for the election of candidates that would represent the party in the 2012 parliamentary elections. The New Patriotic Party is the biggest opposition party in the Parliament of Ghana with 107 members of parliament out of 230. Nominations for the primaries opened on 28 February and closed on 6 March 2011. 73 constituencies had their current members of parliament standing unopposed. At such places, the members were elected by acclamation. A total of 516 persons contested the 220 constituency seats.

== Closing of nominations ==
At the close of nomination on Sunday March 6, 2011, 516 applicants picked up nomination forms to commence the process of contesting the April 30 NPP primaries.

== Suspended primaries ==
Ten out of the 230 constituencies across the country were suspended from holding primaries to elect parliamentary candidates as there had been issues obstructing the run of the elections in those 10 constituencies. Party officials held the view that the decision was strategic, serving the best interest of the party and effected constituencies. The constituencies where primaries were suspended were:

- Abuakwa North
- Obom-Domeabra
- Zebila
- Sisala East
- Sisala West
- Sege
- Nkawkaw
- Bekwai
- Bosome Freho
- Talensi

== Voting day ==
Prior to the start of the elections for the party's historic nationwide parliamentary primaries, Nana Addo Dankwa Akufo-Addo, the 2012 presidential candidate of the party, and Jake Obetsebi Lamptey, National party chairman, urged all the aspirants, delegates and other stakeholders to "have healthy primaries and continue to show to the country that they were a united force, deserving of their mandate...with competence, maturity, spirit de corps and unity of purpose."

Furthermore, the National Democratic Congress (NDC), the ruling party extended its “warmest felicitations” to the New Patriotic Party as the NPP held its parliamentary primaries to elect candidates for the 2012 general elections. Over 123,000 delegates were expected to elect the party's parliamentary candidates for the 2012 general elections. Voting at the 220 constituencies begun at 9 hours GMT and ended at 14 hours GMT in almost all the constituencies.

== The results ==
=== First winner ===
Agnes Asangalisa Chigabatia, who was a former Member of Parliament for Builsa North and current Upper East Regional Chairperson of the party won the right to represent the party in the 2012 parliamentary elections. Mrs. Chigabatia, who had served as a deputy Regional Minister under the John Kufuor administration, polled 171 votes to defeat her two male opponents: Thomas Alonsi, a former District Chief Executive, who polled 116 votes and James Abukasey with 70 votes.

=== Results ===
The results of the primaries started trickling into various news agencies after 14 hours GMT. Like in all nationwide elections, there were hot spots in which many people in the country could not tell who would emerge the winner. In most of such constituencies the NPP's candidate was the incumbent MP.

=== New records ===
The organizing of the NPP primaries was a first in itself as so many constituencies primaries were held on the same day. Another first was seen when Musa Superior won the elections to be the NPP's candidate for the Tamale Central constituency without being in Ghana. Superior polled 278 votes to win the NPP parliament primaries ticket in the election with Iddrisu Sunday and Mohammed Ishmael polling 129 and 38 votes respectively.

Another record was set by Frances Asiam who became the first former executive of the NDC to win a primary in the NPP. She was a former women's organizer of the opposition NDC but left the party before the 2008 parliamentary and presidential election to join the NPP. She won the Adenta constituency primaries.

== The aftermath of the elections ==
Though most contestants were happy with the outcome of the elections, a few like Vicky Bright, defeated aspirant for the Okaikoi South constituency, challenged the results of the polls. She lost to Ahmed Asser by 12 votes at the end of the election. According to her, the voting process was flawed in that the number of votes cast that were ticked in the electoral register did not tally with the number of votes that were actually cast.
