= Nana Kwame Nyanteh =

Ghanaian politician

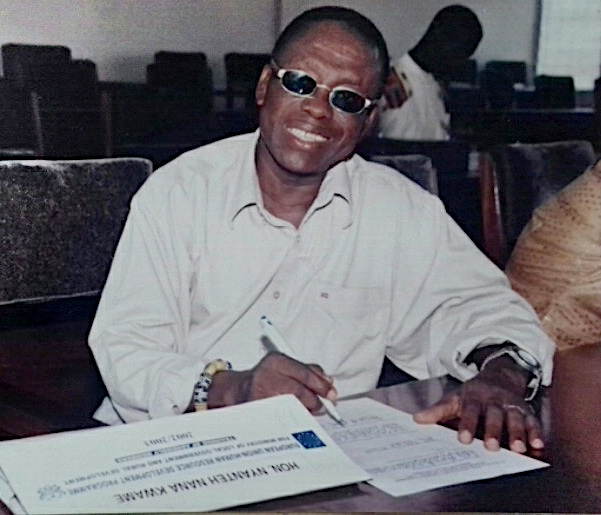
Honourable Nana Kwame Nyanteh at a workshop for Assembly Men, designed by the EU

Nana Kwame Larbi Nyanteh (June 26, 1937 – April 21, 2015) was a Ghanaian politician, an agronomist and Clan Chief who served as an Assembly Man for the Betom Electoral Area from 2003 to 2006. Prior to his election he stood as the parliamentary candidate for the New Juaben constituency on the ticket of the Convention Peoples' Party during the 1993 General Election. Nana Kwame joined the New Patriotic Party in the year 1994.

== Early life and education ==
He was raised in Koforidua Betom where he had his primary and middle school education. Although he was an excellent student, his father, Joseph Nyanteh, a carpenter, found it difficult to further his education. Kwame Nyanteh graduated with first class honours degree in agriculture (BSc. Agriculture) in June 1968 from Kwame Nkrumah University of Science and Technology, after having completed a diploma in tropical agriculture in December 1963 from the same university. He went on to pursue a Master of Science in Entomology (1977) in University of Ghana, Legon.

== Career ==
Kwame Nyanteh was appointed senior technical officer with the Volta River Authority Agriculture Resettlement Unit of the Ministry of Agriculture and stationed at Asikuma in the Volta Region, in charge of Nkwakwabew, Todome and Apeguso resettlement areas from 1964, until he was transferred in 1966 to Bekwi and Kintanpo area as an operational officer for the Ministry of Agriculture. He was later on recruited by Cadbury Ghana Limited as the Operational Manager from 1970 to 1980.

He left Cadbury and became an independent analyst producing research for companies like Finagra US and other companies. His independent research work helped in promoting Ghana's cocoa bean pods on the International markets and paved the way for companies like Finagra US, to run a profitable purchasing system without the need for a local based office in West Africa.

== See also ==
- MPs elected in the Ghanaian parliamentary election, 1996
- List of Ghanaian politicians
- MPs elected in the Ghanaian parliamentary election, 1992
