= NPP Women's Wing =

Women's wing of the New Patriotic Party (NPP) of Ghana

NPP WOMEN'S WING
- Headquarters: Accra
- Ideology: Liberal conservatism Conservatism
- Mother party: New Patriotic Party
- Website: newpatrioticparty.org

The NPP Women's Wing is the main women's wing of the New Patriotic Party of Ghana. This is a special organ of the Party which promotes the policies and programs of the Party amongst women.

The women's Wing was formed with the primary aim of building a strong, disciplined and well-resourced women's network in Ghana.
