= J.B. Machator =

J.B. Machator was the Presiding Member of the Nkwanta District in the Volta Region of Ghana from 1998 till his death on 20 February 2006. He was a leader of the Kokomba community in the Nkwanta District and a very influential member of the New Patriotic Party. He is on record to be the secret behind the N.P.Ps winning of its only seat in the region in the 2004 presidential and parliamentary elections. He left behind a wife and seven children.
