= Emmanuel Erskine =

Ghanaian military officer (1935–2021)

- Born: 19 January 1935; Kumasi, Ghana
- Died: 7 May 2021 (aged 86)
- Military career
- Allegiance: Ghana
- Branch: Ghana Army
- Service years: 1960–1986
- Rank: Lieutenant General
- Commands: United Nations Interim Force in Lebanon; United Nations Truce Supervision Organization; Chief of Army Staff; Ghana Signals Regiment

Emmanuel Alexander Erskine (19 January 1935 – 7 May 2021) was a Ghanaian military officer and politician. He was a Chief of Army Staff of the Ghana Army. He was also a commander of the United Nations Truce Supervision Organization (UNTSO) and the United Nations Interim Force in Lebanon (UNIFIL).

== Early life and education ==
Emmanuel Erskine was born on 19 January 1935. He trained in various military institutions in the United Kingdom. He had telecommunications training at the Royal Military Academy at Sandhurst in England, completing in 1960. He was also at the Staff College, Camberley in 1968 and trained at the Royal College of Defence Studies in 1968 and 1972.

== Military career ==
=== Ghana Army ===
Erskine was commissioned at the Royal Military Academy Sandhurst in December 1960 into the Signal Corps of the Ghana Army. He served in various capacities with the Ghana Army. He was Commanding Officer of the Ghana Signals Regiment and later Director of Communications with the Ghana Ministry of Defence. He later became Director for Operations and Planning at the same Ministry from 1971 to 1972. He was the Chief of Army Staff briefly between January and February 1972. He again held the same position from February 1973 to April 1974.

=== United Nations peacekeeping ===
Erskine served as the Chief of Staff and Deputy Force Commander of the Second United Nations Emergency Force (UNEF II) from 1974 to 1976 in Egypt. He was then appointed the Chief of Staff of the United Nations Truce Supervision Organization (UNTSO) in Israel between January 1976 and April 1978. He subsequently became the first commander of the United Nations Interim Force in Lebanon (UNIFIL) between 1978 and 1981. Erskine again occupied the position of Chief of Staff of UNTSO and was also the United Nations Secretary General's Representative for Matters relating to UN Peacekeeping Operations in the Middle East from February 1981 to May 1986.

== Political career ==
Erskine was one of the founding members of the People's Heritage Party (PHP). He was the party's presidential candidate during the 1992 Ghanaian presidential election. He came fifth with 1.7% of the vote. The PHP later merged with the National Independence Party to form the People's Convention Party (PCP) in 1993.

=== National Reconciliation Commission ===
Erskine was one of the nine members of the National Reconciliation Commission which were appointed by the President of Ghana, John Kufuor in consultation with the Council of State of Ghana. The commission was to investigate human rights abuses committed during the five military regimes which have ruled Ghana.

== General Emmanuel Erskine Research and Documentation Centre ==
The Centre for Peace Initiatives in Africa (CPIA) is a peace organization based in Harare, Zimbabwe. It was established in February 2001 and had Erskine as the chairman of the board of trustees. The CPIA has the General Emmanuel Erskine Research and Documentation Centre (GERDC) named in his honor and was officially opened in September 2001 by him. The GERDC also launched the General Emmanuel Erskine Annual Lecture Series. The inaugural lecture was delivered by Erskine.

== Other activities ==
Erskine was the Chairman of the Opportunities Industrialization Centre Ghana Accra Local Programme Committee. He had been a member of the Pugwash council since 1992 and was a participant at the 50th Pugwash conference which deliberated on "Eliminating the Causes of War". He served as the Chairman of the Ghana Action Network on Small Arms (GANSA) in 2002.

== Death ==
Erskine died on 7 May 2021.

== Publications ==
- Erskine, Emmanuel; Kapoor, B.L.; Norton, Augustus R. (1987). Peace, security and humanitarian relief in northern Mozambique: An IPA fact-finding mission. International Peace Academy. pp. 34 pages. ASIN: B00072LYLA.
- Erskine, Emmanuel (30 September 1989). Mission with UNIFIL: An African Soldier's Reflections. C Hurst & Co Publishers Ltd. pp. 272 pages. ISBN 978-1-85065-048-5.
- Emmanuel Erskine & Peggy Mason (December 1999). DISARMAMENT, DEMOBILIZATION AND REINTEGRATION OF EX-COMBATANTS IN A PEACEKEEPING ENVIRONMENT – Principles and Guidelines (PDF). New York: Training & Evaluation Services/Department of Peacekeeping Operations, United Nations. pp. 119 pages.
- Peace Keeping Techniques for Africa's Conflict Management. Afram Publications Ghana Ltd. April 2000. pp. 255 pages. ISBN 978-9964-70-209-0.
- General Emmanuel Erskine Annual Lecture on Peace and Security: Inaugural Lecture Topic, National Reconciliation--The Ghana Experience. Centre for Peace Initiatives in Africa. January 2006. pp. 32 pages. ISBN 978-1-77926-027-7.

Military offices
| Preceded by H. D. Twum-Barimah | Chief of Army Staff; 1972 | Succeeded by D. A. Asare |
| Preceded by D. A. Asare | Chief of Army Staff; 1973–1974 | Succeeded by Fred Akuffo |
| Preceded by Keith Howard | Chief of Staff, United Nations Truce Supervision Organization; 1976–1978 | Succeeded by William O'Callaghan |
| New title | Force Commander, United Nations Interim Force in Lebanon; 1978–1981 | Succeeded by William O'Callaghan |
| Preceded by Erkki R. Kaira | Chief of Staff, United Nations Truce Supervision Organization; 1981–1986 | Succeeded by William O'Callaghan |
Party political offices
| New title | People's Heritage Party Presidential Candidate; 1992 | Party merged with National Independence Party to form People's Convention Party |
