= Oseim =

- Location in Ghana
- Coordinates: 6°15′N 0°27′E
- Country: Ghana
- Region: [eastern region ghana]
- Time zone: UTC+0 (GMT +0)

Oseim is a small town in the Eastern Region of southeastern Ghana. It was the birthplace of Albert Adu Boahen.
