= Nasara =

Muslim wing of the New Patriotic Party (NPP) of Ghana

NASARA
- Headquarters: Accra
- Ideology: Liberal conservatism Conservatism
- Mother party: New Patriotic Party
- Website: newpatrioticparty.org

Nasara is the Zongo wing of the New Patriotic Party with the primary purpose of mobilizing members for the party within the Muslim Communities of Ghana.

The Nasara wing was birthed by the late Alhaji Hussein Maiga, Alhaji Muhammed Salisu Kentebako, a lifelong elder and patron of the Ablekuma North Constituency NPP and some Muslim patriots like Hajia Meimuna Yakubu (Hajia Fara), Alhaji Rufai, Alhaji Bismi and Alhaji Sadat. Set up as the national urban Muslim population coordination structure of the party, it was to be coordinated at the presidential level with a sitting NPP president or the presidential candidate if the party is not in power, as its honorary president. With the highest serving Muslim public servant at its helm, with the then vice president the late Alhaji Aliu Mahama playing this role.

Other achievements include:

- Recognition of Zongo Chiefs in national house of chiefs' registry
- Special policy initiative specific to Zongos by successive administrations

In 2018, the constitution of the party was amended to formally make NASARA a special wing of the party. A move some have criticised as downgrade of the initiative. Now coordinators from the constituency, regional to national levels are elected and deputies appointed to deputize the elected coordinators. The aim of this wing is to harness all untapped potential and give a loud voice to the visibly minority Zongo communities in the Ghanaian political landscape. Abdul Aziz Futah is the current national NASARA coordinator. The Nasara is a special organ of the Party, which promotes the policies and programs of the Party in Zongo Communities. Its responsibilities are to:

== Primary Purposes ==
- To recruit and cultivate support of the residents of the Zongo Communities into the membership of the NPP.
- Be the mouthpiece of the Zongo Communities and to help promote policies that will enhance the welfare of Zongo residents.
- Create a nationwide force within the Party to cater for the activities and interest of residents of the Zongo Communities.
- Create a nationwide force within the Party to cater for the activities and interest of residents of the Zongo Communities.

== Zongo Youth Patriots (ZYP) ==
The Zongo Youth Patriots (ZYP) is an affiliate group of the Nasara wing of the New Patriotic Party.
