= National Independence Party (Ghana) =

- Leader: Kwabena Darko
- Founded: 1992
- Dissolved: 1993
- Merged into: People's Convention Party with People's Heritage Party
- Headquarters: Accra
- Ideology: Nkrumaism

The National Independence Party (NIP) is a defunct political party in Ghana. It was formed in 1992 in the run up to the inauguration of the Fourth Republic of Ghana. The party came to an end in 1993 following a merger with another Nkrumahist party.

== Formation ==
The NIP was founded in 1992 after the ban on political parties was lifted in May, 1992 by the Provisional National Defence Council government of Jerry Rawlings. The party was one of many that professed to follow the Nkrumah ideology. Other parties who also claimed Nkrumah heritage include the People's National Convention, the People's Heritage Party and the National Convention Party.

== 1992 elections ==
The NIP contested the 1992 Ghanaian presidential election on 3 November 1992. Its presidential nominee was Kwabena Darko, a multimillionaire entrepreneur. Kwabena Darko came fourth, winning 2.8% of the total votes cast. Although the international observers of this election declared it free and fair, the NIP together with three other parties, the New Patriotic Party, the People's National Convention and the People's Heritage Party claimed the elections were fraudulent and went on to boycott the parliamentary election held on 29 December 1992.

== Merger ==
In 1993, during the first year of the Fourth Republic of Ghana, the NIP merged with the People's Heritage Party, another pro-Nkrumah party to form the People's Convention Party.

== See also ==
- List of political parties in Ghana
