= Kow Nkensen Arkaah =

Ghanaian civil servant and politician (1927–2001)

Vice-President of Ghana (1st Vice-President of the 4th Republic)
- In office 7 January 1993 – 7 January 1997
- President: Jerry John Rawlings
- Preceded by: None*
- Succeeded by: John Atta Mills

Personal details
- Born: 14 July 1927 Senya Breku, Gold Coast
- Died: 25 April 2001 (aged 73) Atlanta, USA
- Party: National Convention Party
- Spouse: Marian Arkaah
- Education: Mfantsipim School; Achimota College; Tufts College (BA); Harvard Business School (MBA)
- Profession: Marketing executive Civil servant
- Although Arkaah was the first Vice-President since the 1992 Constitution, the first Vice-President of Ghana was J. W. de Graft-Johnson

Kow Nkensen Arkaah (14 July 1927 – 25 April 2001) was a Ghanaian politician who was Vice-President of Ghana from 1993 to 1997. He was also a chief of Senya Beraku.

== Early life ==
Kow Arkaah was born on 14 July 1927 in Senya Beraku in the Central Region of the Gold Coast (now Ghana). He attended Mfantsipim School between 1941 and 1946, then Achimota College. He proceeded to the United States of America, where he obtained his first degree at Tufts College, after which he attended Harvard University for an MBA between 1952 and 1954.

== Career ==
Arkaah was an Assistant Sales Manager of Secony Oil Corporation of New York City. He later returned to his homeland. From 1954 to 1957, Arkaah worked as a Marketing Executive of Mobil Oil Ghana Limited. For the next 10 years up to 1968, Arkaah worked with the civil service, rising to become Principal Secretary between 1966 and 1968. He was head of the Ghana National Trading Corporation (GNTC), a huge national trading franchise at the time, the Ghana Airways airline and the Ghana National Procurement Agency. During 1965, he was the Chief Commercial Officer for foreign trade. He has also worked as a consultant in the Gambia, Sierra Leone, Yugoslavia and Ethiopia.

== Politics ==
Arkaah became the leader of the National Convention Party (NCP) prior to the 1992 presidential elections. His party formed an alliance with the National Democratic Congress (NDC) of Jerry Rawlings, and Every Ghanaian Living Everywhere (EGLE). As part of the deal, Arkaah became the vice-presidential candidate on Rawlings' ticket. Rawlings and Arkaah had a difficult working relationship throughout their four-year term. The high point was an alleged punch-up between them at a cabinet meeting on 28 December 1995. Rawlings alluded that there had been some form of misunderstanding. Arkaah styled himself the "stubborn cat" after that incident.

Arkaah became the leader of the Convention People's Party formed by the merger of the NCP and the People's Convention Party. The merger was announced on 29 January 1996. Arkaah, who continued as vice-president of Ghana, stood as a candidate in the 1996 presidential elections and lost. He was replaced in the Rawlings government by Professor John Atta Mills, a law lecturer, as Rawlings' deputy.

== Death ==
Arkaah was involved in a road traffic accident at Cantonments, Accra. He died of his injuries in Atlanta in the United States on 25 April 2001.

Political offices
| Preceded by Fourth Republic established | Vice-President of Ghana; 1993–97 | Succeeded by John Atta Mills |
Party political offices
| New title | National Convention Party presidential candidate 1992 | Merger with People's Convention Party to form the Convention People's Party ^{1} |
| New title | Convention People's Party presidential candidate 1996 | Succeeded by George Hagan |
Notes and references
1. https://www.ghanaweb.com/GhanaHomePage/NewsArchive/artikel.php?ID=494
