= New Patriotic Party =

Political party in Ghana

New Patriotic Party Ahofama Foforo Kuw
- Abbreviation: NPP
- Leader: Mahamudu Bawumia
- Chairman: Stephen Ayensu Ntim
- General Secretary: Justin Frimpong-Kodua
- Founded: 28 July 1992
- Preceded by: UGCC, United Party(UP), Progress Party
- Headquarters: Accra, Ghana
- Student wing: TESCON
- Youth wing: NPP Youth Wing
- Muslim wing: Nasara
- Women's wing: NPP Women's Wing
- Ideology: Liberal conservatism Conservatism
- Political position: Centre-right
- Regional affiliation: Democracy Union of Africa
- International affiliation: International Democracy Union
- Colors: Red, white, blue
- Parliament: 88 / 276
- Pan African Parliament: 2 / 5

Election symbol
- African elephant

Party flag
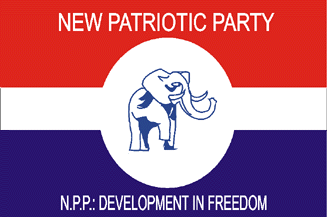

Website
- newpatrioticparty.org

The New Patriotic Party (NPP; Twi: Ahofama Foforo Kuw) is a centre-right and liberal-conservative political party in Ghana. Since the democratisation of Ghana in 1992, it has been one of the two dominant parties in Ghanaian politics, with its leading rival being the centre-left National Democratic Congress (NDC). John Kufuor of the NPP was president of Ghana from 2001 to 2009. At the elections held on 7 December 2004, the party won 129 out of 230 seats. The NPP candidate was Kufuor, who was re-elected as president with 52.75% of the vote. The New Patriotic Party symbol is the African elephant and the New Patriotic Party colours are red, white, and blue.

In the 2008 general election, the NPP candidate Nana Akufo-Addo conceded to losing in the closely contested presidential election runoff amidst accusations of vote rigging, with Akufo-Addo receiving 49.77% of the votes, versus 50.23% for John Atta Mills, the NDC candidate. In the 2012 general election, the NPP faced a similar situation from vote results provided by the Electoral Commission of Ghana (EC). Nana Akufo-Addo received 47.74% of the vote, while NDC candidate John Mahama received 50.7% amidst accusations of electoral fraud. Akufo-Addo was chosen as the NPP's candidate for a third time in the 2016 elections and defeated Mahama in the first round (winning 53.83% of the votes).

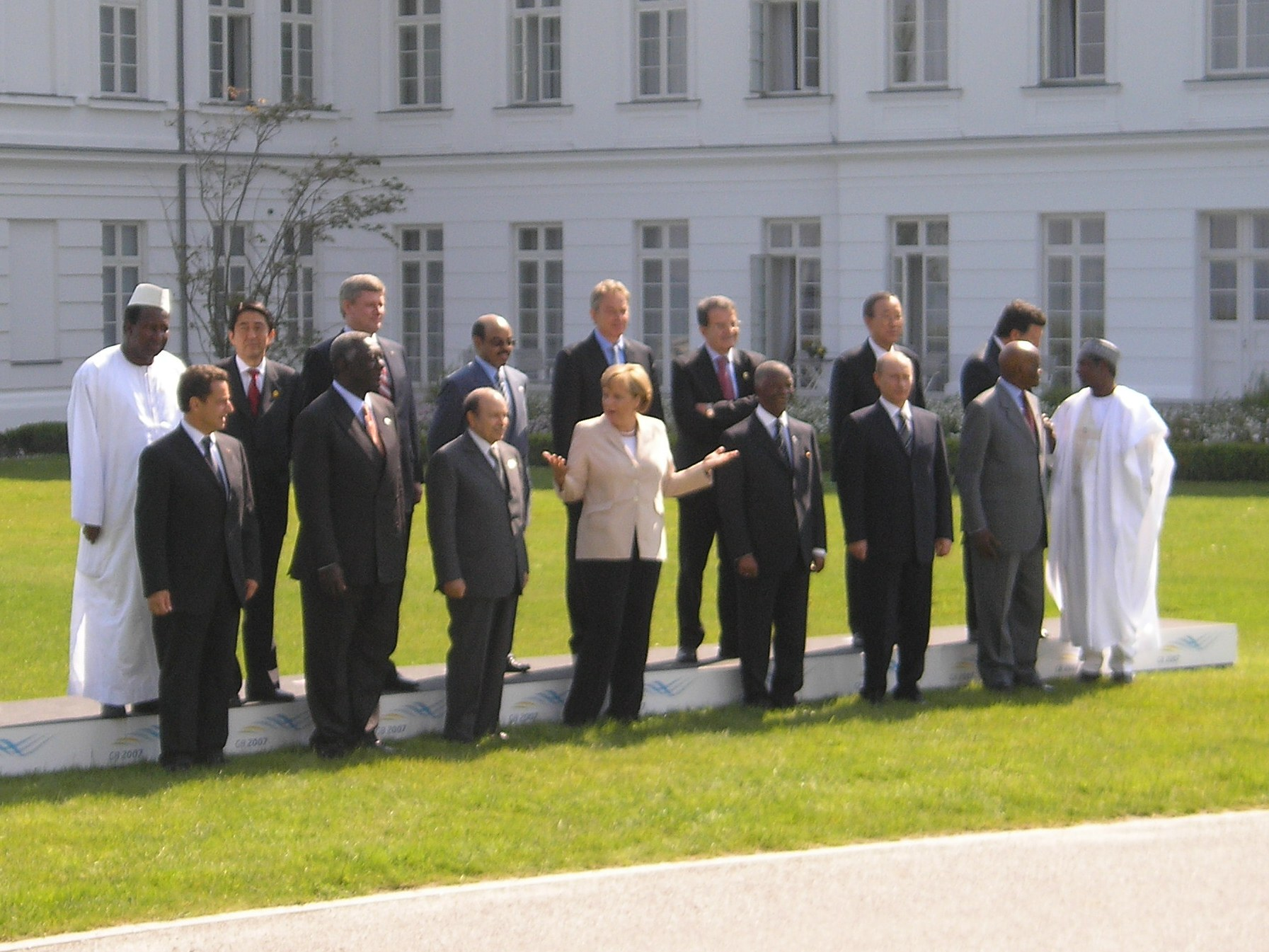
2nd President of the New Patriotic Party, John Agyekum Kufuor at the 33rd G8 summit in Mecklenburg-Vorpommern, Germany (Kufuor in front, second from the left)

The New Patriotic Party has so far contested every national general election in Ghana since the commencement of the fourth republic in 1992, with the exception of the parliamentary elections of 1992. The New Patriotic boycotted the 1992 parliamentary elections, alleging that the 1992 presidential election held earlier was rigged. The New Patriotic Party wrote a book titled Stolen Verdict to register its protest against the 1992 presidential election.

The New Patriotic Party is considered as an offshoot of the United Gold Coast Convention, which effectively evolved into the United Party in the late 1950s, the Progress Party in the late 1960s, the Popular Front Party in the 1970s and the All People's Party in the early 1980s.

After more than a decade of military rule by Jerry John Rawlings, the government, along with some stakeholders, drafted a constitution for which a referendum election was organized. After the people of Ghana approved the new constitution in an election (held on 28 April 1992), the ban on party politics in Ghana was lifted, allowing other parties including the NPP to be officially launched. The NPP's flagbearer was Professor Albert Adu Boahen, a scholar and a long-time critic of the Rawlings military government. However, the NPP lost the 1992 election overwhelmingly to the Progressive alliance of the National Democratic Congress, Eagle and the National Convention Party whose candidate was Jerry John Rawlings. The NPP boycotted the parliamentary elections and hence won no seats in the new Parliament.

The NPP lost the 1996 elections again to Rawlings' party but this time, their flagbearer was John Kufuor. In the 2000 and 2004 elections, John Kufuor won both elections ushering in a new government for the first time in the fourth republic of Ghana.

== Electoral history ==
=== 1992 elections ===
The New Patriotic Party (NPP) Kukurudu lost the 1992 presidential elections to the National Democratic Congress led by Jerry John Rawlings. Despite the elections being declared as free and fair by international observers, Professor Adu Boahen, the NPP candidate, alleged that there was heavy rigging by the Interim National Electoral Commission headed by Nana Oduro Nimapau and hence the NPP as well as the National Independence Party, People's Heritage Party and the People's National Convention boycotted the parliamentary elections. The decision to not contest in the parliamentary elections which was held a couple of weeks after the presidential election at the time meant that the National Democratic Congress, National Convention Party and the Eagle Party which was already a coalition won almost all the parliamentary seats available. One seat was actually won by an independent candidate, Hawa Yakubu.

This protest, however, led to some reforms in the electoral system, notably the use of transparent ballot boxes at polling stations, issuing of voter ID cards and the use of indelible ink (which lasted for a month) to mark people who had been registered to avoid double voting.

After more than a decade of military rule by Jerry John Rawlings, the government, along with some stakeholders, drafted a constitution for which a referendum election was organized. After the people of Ghana approved the new constitution in an election (held on 28 April 1992), the ban on party politics in Ghana was lifted, allowing other parties including the NPP to be officially launched.New Patriotic Party, Biography According to the NPP leadership, figures in certain constituencies had been massaged, hence the results published by the Electoral Commission and the Ghana press (mostly Peace FM online and Ghanaweb) were not accurate.New Patriotic Party, Biography

=== 1996 elections ===
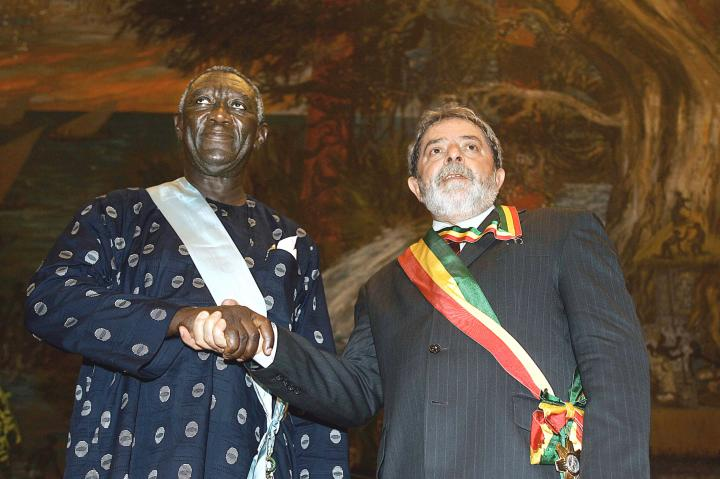
John Kufuor (left) with the President of Brazil, Lula da Silva (right)

After the defeat in 1992, the NPP chairman at the time, Peter Ala Adjetey, stated that the party was resolved to do their homework and wrestle power from the NDC in the 1996 election. They made the decision that regardless of the results, they would contest for parliamentary seats to stop what was seen as an NDC monopoly in Parliament.

Prior to the party convention, it appeared that the overwhelming favourite to become the next presidential candidate was a well renowned economist known as Kwame Pianim. However, some members of the party led by Florence Ekwam challenged Pianim's eligibility due to a prior conviction during the PNDC era. The Supreme Court of Ghana declared Pianim as ineligible and hence he couldn't be considered for nomination. On 20 April 1996, John Kufuor was nominated as the NPP presidential candidate with 1034 out of 2000 delegates drawn from all the 200 Constituencies to run for the presidency in the general election held on 10 December 1996. This time, both presidential and parliamentary elections were held on the same day, unlike the previous election, as part of the reforms by the National Electoral Commission headed by Kwadwo Afari-Gyan.

The NPP gained an unlikely alliance from the vice-president of Ghana, Kow Nkensen Arkaah, whose party (National Convention Party) had severed their alliance with the National Democratic Congress. The NPP hence formed what was deemed as the "Great Alliance" with the NCP and Vice-president Arkaah was nominated to be the running mate of Kuffuor. After campaigning for less than nine months, Kufuor polled 39.62% of the popular votes to Jerry Rawlings' 57% in the 1996 election. Despite the elections being declared as free and fair by international observers, the New Patriotic Party alleged that the election had been rigged by the National Electoral Commission and President Rawlings. The NPP, however, won a substantial number of seats in the Ghana parliament and effectively ended the NDC monopoly.

=== 2000 elections ===
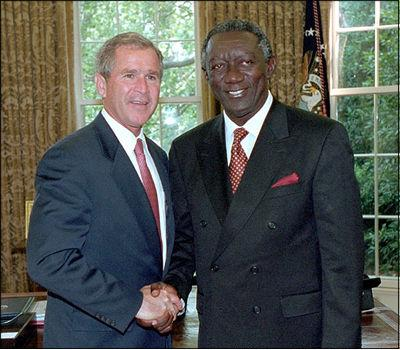
John Kufuor (right) with the President of the United States, George W. Bush (left), in June 2001

On 23 October 1998, Kufuor was re-nominated by the New Patriotic Party to run again for the presidency. President Rawlings, facing term limits, was due to retire after the 2000 elections. Pianim, however, resigned from the NPP and Peter Ala Adjetey, the party chairman, handed over the chairmanship to Samuel Odoi-Sykes. Aliu Mahama stood as the running mate of John Kufuor. The NDC in turn nominated Vice-president John Atta Mills as its presidential candidate.

Kufuor won the first round of the presidential election, held on 7 December 2000, with 48.4% of the popular votes. His closest challenger was Atta Mills with 44.8% of the votes. The electoral rules in Ghana mandate that the winner of elections must cross a 50% threshold. A run off election was hence organised. All the parties came together to support the NPP including the Convention People's Party, Reform Party and the United Ghana Movement against the NDC.

In the second round, held on 28 December 2000, Kufour was victorious, taking 56.9% of the vote. When Kufuor was sworn in on 7 January 2001, it marked the first time in history that an incumbent government had peacefully surrendered power to the opposition.

=== 2004 elections ===
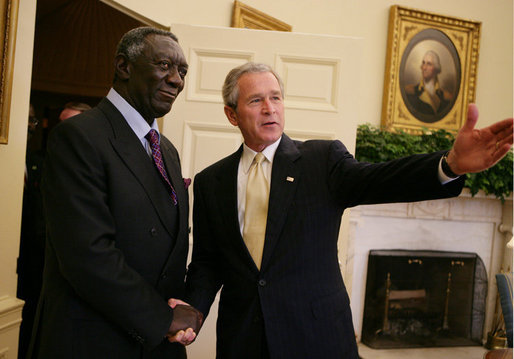
John Agyekum Kufuor on a state visit with George W. Bush at the White House in April 2006

The New Patriotic Party's president, John Agyekum Kufuor, was once again re-elected in the Ghanaian general election presidential and parliamentary elections held on 7 December 2004, earning 52.45% of the popular vote in the first round and thus avoiding a run-off, while at the same time, the New Patriotic Party, was able to secure more seats in the Parliament.

=== 2008 elections ===
Several government officials in the Kufuor administration resigned their cabinet positions to contest for the NPP flagbearership in July 2007. This included Nkrabea Effah Dartey, Nana Akufo-Addo, Alan John Kyerematen and 13 other contenders. Akufo-Addo and Kyerematen were the two leading candidates according to the pundits. However, Akufo-Addo won 48% of the votes in the first round of the party delegates election. The NPP set aside a provision in the party's constitution which required that candidates obtain 50% + one vote of delegates to secure the party's nomination, thus making Nana Akufo-Addo the New Patriotic party's candidate for the 2008 presidential elections.

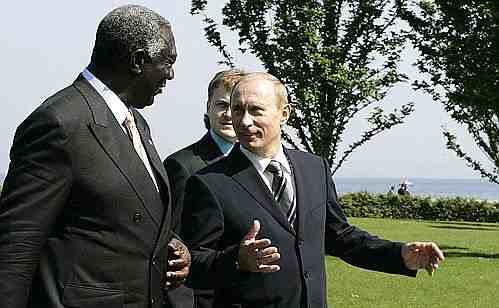
John Kufuor with President of Russia Vladimir Putin at the 33rd G8 summit

In the 7 December 2008 presidential elections, Akufo-Addo placed first and received more votes than John Atta Mills, amassing 4,159,439 votes, representing 49.13% of the total votes cast; however, he fell short of the 50% needed for an outright victory. It was the best-ever performance for a first-time presidential candidate since the beginning of Ghana's Fourth Republic in 1992. In the run-off election, however, Mills received 4,521,032 votes, representing 50.23%, and thus defeated Akufo-Addo.

The run-off elections were marred with controversy and once again, although international observers had expressed satisfaction with the way and manner the elections were conducted, the NPP alleged voter fraud. According to the NPP leadership, figures in certain constituencies had been massaged, hence the results published by the Electoral Commission and the Ghana press (mostly Peace FM online and GhanaWeb) were not accurate. Also, NPP activists like Kwabena Agyapong and Elizabeth Ohene were allegedly intimidated in areas of the Volta Region of Ghana, a region where the NPP had never won any constituency. The complaint led to a delay in the declaration of the results, sparking angry NDC demonstrators onto the streets of the capital city Accra. Tony Aidoo, an NDC activist, fired up these NDC protesters by dismissing the NPP claims as "stupid". The chairman of the electoral commission, Kwadwo Afari Djan, eventually organised a press conference and claimed that the Tain Constituency had some issues and hence another run-off election had to be organised in that constituency alone. After revising the figures, he asserted that although John Atta Mills was leading in the popular votes, the number of registered voters in the Tain constituency were enough to swing the election the other way. Therefore, the final results would be declared after the Tain constituency results had been certified and declared. An election was held in that constituency on 2 January 2009 and Mills won by a very comfortable margin of 90.6% to 4%.

The NPP officially went back into opposition in January 2009 when John Kufuor handed over power to John Atta Mills.

=== 2012 elections ===
On Saturday, 7 August 2010, the New Patriotic Party re-elected Akufo-Addo as its presidential candidate for the 2012 presidential election. Akufo-Addo received the votes of 79% of the delegates. The electoral convention was the largest that any political party had ever convened in any African state. The New Patriotic Party campaigned on an anti-corruption platform, and to provide free SHS (Secondary High School) education for the population of Ghana.

Following Akufo-Addo's defeat in the presidential election, the New Patriotic Party and Akufo-Addo contested the vote results provided by the Electoral Commission of Ghana, alleging that the 2012 general elections were rigged. They cited tampered vote counts and vote rigging from polling stations in South Ghana. The New Patriotic Party unsuccessfully asked the Electoral Commission of Ghana and its chairman Kwadwo Afari-Gyan to use the "72 hours withdrawal of election results law" that is written in the constitution of Ghana to "investigate" electoral fraud. The party decided not to concede defeat until an external investigation and a vote recount were completed.

The New Patriotic Party filed a writ with the Supreme Court of Ghana requesting that the results declared by the electoral commission be invalidated. Despite claiming publicly that the election was rigged by the ruling NDC government, their writ in court alleged that there were inconsistencies and irregularities at certain polling stations. Therefore, they wanted the results at those stations to be invalidated. These were in effect polling stations that the NDC won comfortably. Therefore, with figures from those stations (over 11000 of them) invalidated, it would mean that NPP would mathematically be the winners. The Supreme Court of Ghana, headed by Justice Atuguba, gave its final verdict, with the majority opinion stating that even if there were inconsistencies, they were insignificant and could not have altered the election's result. Akufo-Addo conceded defeat after the verdict, on 29 August 2013.

=== 2016 elections ===
During the 2016 presidential election, the New Patriotic Party's candidate Nana Akufo-Addo defeated the incumbent President and National Democratic Congress candidate John Mahama, winning 53.85% of the vote. In addition, the NPP won 155 seats during the 2016 parliamentary election, exceeding the 138 quorum needed to form a majority.

John Mukum Mbaku of the Brookings Institution praised Akufo-Addo for showing magnimity in victory and Mahama for conceding defeat, facilitating a peaceful transition process. Mbaku said that the 2016 election solidified Ghana's credentials as a country "willing to strengthen its democratic institutions and to enhance its ability to live within the rule of law." The European Union's Election Observation Mission certified the 2016 Ghanaian elections as largely fair and free while acknoledging that the Electoral Commission encountered some problems with communication, voter registration, ballot printing and special voting.

=== 2020 elections ===
During the 2020 presidential election held on 10 December, President and NPP candidate Nana Akufo-Addo was re-elected with 51.59% of the vote, defeating the NDC's candidate John Mahama. During the parliamentary election, the incumbent NPP and the opposition NDC parties won 137 seats each. The sole independent candidate joined the NPP, giving the party a one-seat majority. During the 2020 general election, Akufo-Addo campaigned on a $17 billion economic recovery programme to address the impact of the COVID-19 pandemic on Ghana's oil and cocoa exports.

While international observers including the European Union's chief observer Javier Nart regarded the 2020 Ghana elections as free and fair, opposition leader Mahama rejected the results, alleging voting irregularities and intimidation by the military. Information Minister Kojo Oppong Nkrumah disputed Mahama's allegations of voter intimidation. The Ghana Police Service also reported 60 incidents of violence and eight deaths during the election. Mahama also unsuccessfully challenged the results of the 2020 election at the Supreme Court of Ghana. On 4 March 2021, the Supreme Court rejected his legal challenge.

=== 2024 elections ===
During the 2024 presidential election, Vice-President Mahamudu Bawumia stood as the NPP's candidate against NDC leader and former President John Mahama. The 2024 general election occurred against the backdrop of an economic recession, rising food prices, a record unemployment rate of 14.7%, corruption and illegal mining. On 8 December, Mahama defeated Bawumia, winning 56.55% of the vote. Bawumia gained 41.61% of the vote, coming second place. Bawumia conceded defeat.

In addition, the NPP lost its majority in the Ghanaian Parliament, falling to 88 seats. In a landslide victory, the NDC won 183 seats. The Commonwealth Observer Group's leader former Botswanan President Mokgweetsi Masisi certified the election as largely free and fair, praising Vice-President Bawumia for exemplary statesmanship in his concession speech. While the Commonwealth Observation Group praised election authorities for facilitating access to the polling booths for disabled and elderly people, it expressed concerns about incidents of deadly violence and wheel chair-bound individuals experiencing long queues.

=== Internal Elections and Governance ===
In alignment with the party constitutional provisions,the leadership of the New Patriotic Party scheduled its National Delegates Conference for September 19 to elect a new cohort of national executive officers to steer the party's administrative and political strategies.

== Party Constitution ==
The party has a constitution registered under law that governs how they operate. The party's constitution was first registered with the Electoral Commission on 24 June 1992. It underwent amendments on 29 August 1998, 22 August 2009, and 17 December 2017.

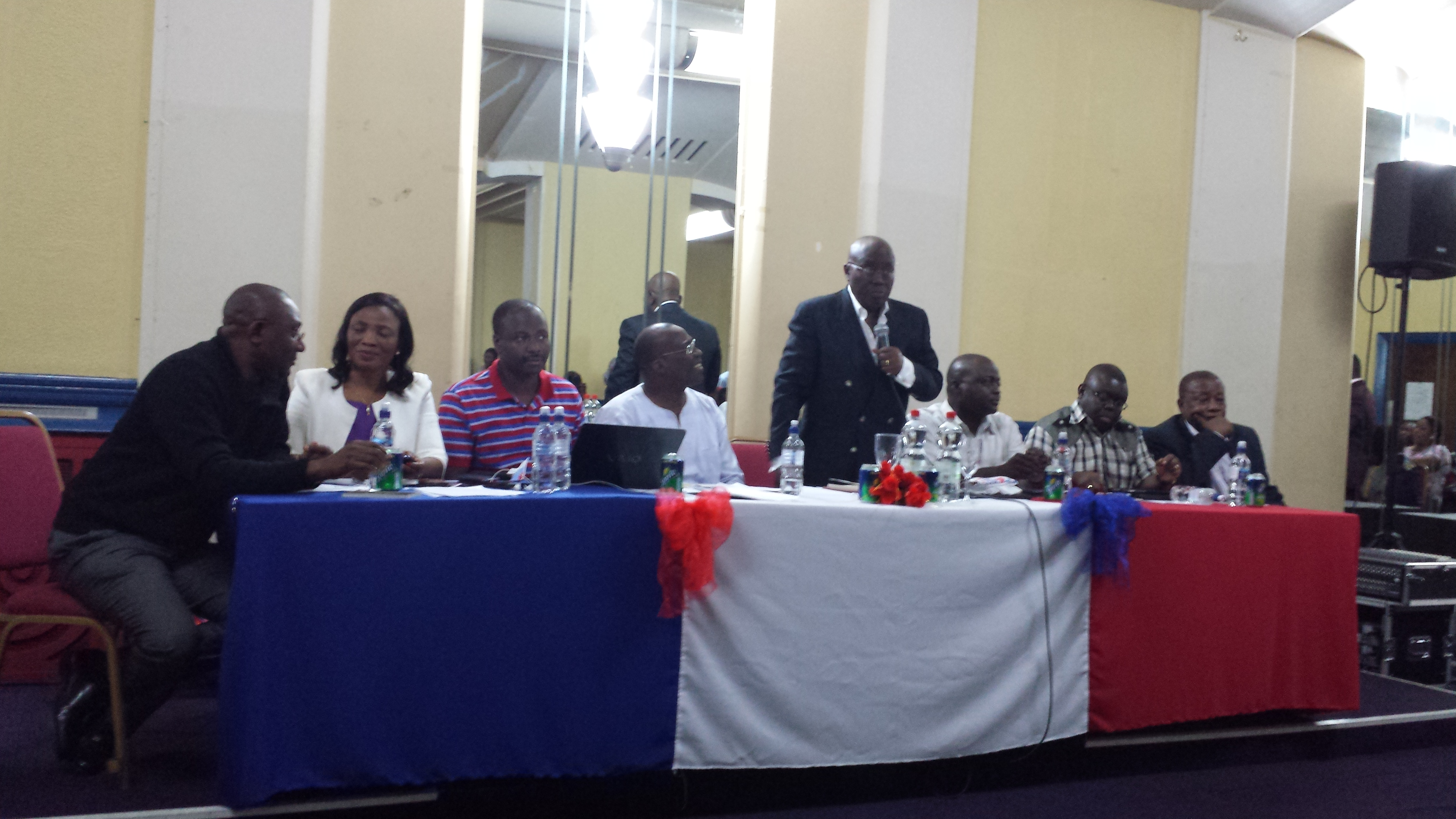
NPP flagbearer Nana Akufo-Addo speaking to members of the New Patriotic Party (NPP)

== National executives ==
The New Patriotic Party (NPP) elects national executives for a four-year duration. According to the New Patriotic Party's constitution, Article 10(2) & (3) mandates that the National Annual Delegates shall meet at least four weeks after the last Regional Annual Delegates Conference.

=== 2000 ===
- The National Chairman elect Mr Harona Esseku
- First National Vice-chairman Mr Stephen Ntim
- The Second National Vice-chairperson Mrs Agnes Adzo Okudzeto
- The Third National Vice-chairman Mr Edmund Annan
- The General Secretary elect was Mr Dan Botwe
- The National Treasurer elect was Mr Michael Dugau
- The National Organiser elect was Mr Lord Commey

=== 2014 ===
The National Delegates Congress was slated for 12 April 2014 in Tamale Sports Stadium. About 5,265 delegates were expected to partake in the internal elections of the party.

- The National Chairman position was contested by four persons; Paul Afoko, Stephen Ntim, Fred Oware and jake Obetsebi-Lamptey. The results are as follows; Paul Afoko 2,034, Stephen Ntim 1,503, Fred Oware 1,135 and Jake Obetsebi-Lamptey 66.
- The Vice-chairman had three competitors; Freddie Blay, Sammy Crabbe and Fredua F. Antoh. The results are as follows; Freddie Blay 2,933, Sammy Crabbe 2,358, and Fredua F. Antoh 1,813.
- The General Secretary had four contestants; Kwabena Agyei Agyepong, Kwadwo Owusu Afriyie, Yaw Buaben Asamoa, and Nkrabea Effah Darteh, The results are as follows;Kwabena Agyei Agyepong 2,529, Kwadwo Owusu Afriyie 1,990, Yaw Buaben Asamoa 181 and Nkrabea Effah Darteh 46.
- Three persons competed in the National Organiser role, John Boadu, Hopeson Yaovi Adorye, and Alhaji Moctar Bamba. The results are as follows; John Boadu 3,279, Hopeson Yaovi Adorye 986 and Alhaji Moctar Bamba 476.
- One person contested in the National Youth Organiser thus Sammy Awuku 471.
- Also, one person contested in the National Nasara Coordinator, thus Kamal-deen Abdulai 84.
- The National Treasurer position was contested by three persons; Emmanuel Abankwa Yeboah, Hajia Ruka, and Suzzy Mensah. The results are as follows; Emmanuel Abankwa Yeboah 2,488, Hajia Ruka 1,162 and Suzzy Mensah 595.
- Three people contested in the National Women's Organiser; Otiko Afisah Djaba, Gifty Tina Mensah, and Mawusi Awity. The results are as follows; Otiko Afisah Djaba 276, Gifty Tina Mensah 250 and Mawusi Awity 113.

=== 2018 ===
The NPP organised the national delegates congress in Eastern region from 15 June 2018 to 17 June 2018.

- In the National Chairman category, there were three contestants; Freddie Blay, Stephen Ayesu Ntim and Dr Richard Amoako Baah. The results are as follows; Freddie Blay – 3,021, Stephen Ayesu Ntim – 2,515 and Dr Richard Amoako Baah – 18.
- The National Vice-chairman category consisted of seven competitors; Rita Asobayire, Frederick Fredua Antoh, Michael Omari Wadie, Emmanuel Ken-Wuud, George Isaac Amoo, Vida Agyekum and Mrs Agnes Asangalisa Chigabatia. The results are as follows; Rita Asobayire – 3671, Frederick Fredua Antoh – 3,125, Michael Omari Wadie – 3,028, Emmanuel Ken-Wuud – 1,325, George Isaac Amoo – 1,222, Vida Agyekum – 1,107, and Mrs Agnes Asangalisa Chigabatia – 836.
- Two contestants battled in the General Secretary role; John Boadu and Richard Ahiagbah. The results are as follows; John Boadu – 4,277 and Richard Ahiagbah – 1,274.
- The National Treasurer had six individuals competing; Kwabena Abankwa-Yeboah, Nuhu Bayorbo Mahama, Mary Posch-Oduro, Hajia Ruka Ahmeed, Abraham Obeng Amoakohene, and Kwabena Oppong Frimpong. The results are as follows; Kwabena Abankwa-Yeboah – 2,492, Nuhu Bayorbo Mahama – 1,050, Mary Posch-Oduro – 1,012, Hajia Ruka Ahmeed – 467, Abraham Obeng Amoakohene – 447, and Kwabena Oppong Frimpong – 50.
- Three people contested in the National Organiser position; Sammi Awuku, Suleiman Sadik, and Emmanuel Kodua. The results are as follows; Sammi Awuku – 4,913, Suleiman Sadik – 942, and Emmanuel Kodua – 266.
- The National Youth Organiser had four persons; Henry Nana Boakye, Dominic Eduah, Kamal-Deen Abdulai, and Emmanuel Nana Appiah. The results are as follows; Henry Nana Boakye – 423, Dominic Eduah – 245, Kamal-Deen Abdulai – 102, and Emmanuel Nana Appiah – 1.
- The National Women's Organiser role had two persons contesting; Kate Gyamfua and Joyce Konokie Zemapare. The results are as follows; Kate Gyamfua – 686 and Joyce Konokie Zempare – 109.
- The Nasara Coordinator position had 14 participants. The results are as follows; Abdul Aziz Haruna Futa – 201, Ahmed Zaruk Nuhu – 123, Alhaji Baba Gado Mohammed – 82, Alhaji Salihu Yahaya Bo – 39, Rashid Adam – 23, Alhaji Musah Sheriff – 19, Aminu Abu – 12, Abubakari Suleimana – 8, Alhaji Iddrisu Abdulai Dipantiche – 4, Kazeem Ibrahim – 1, Abdul-Rahman Diallo – 1, Alhaji Dauda Abdul Rahman Duodu – 0, Ali Suraj - 0, Sulemana Alhassan Atakpo - 0

=== 2022 ===
The national executives elections for 2022 was held on 17 July at the Accra Sports Stadium.

- In the National Chairman category, these were the contestants; Gifty Asantewa Ayeh— 44, Sammy Crabbe— 32, Professor Christopher Ameyaw-Ekumfi— 101, Akwasi Osei Adjei— 20, Stephen Ayensu Ntim— 4014, Stephen Asamoah-Boateng—1010, Kwabena Abankwa-Yeboah—294. With Stephen Ayensu Ntim emerging as the winner.
- The National Vice-chairman category consisted of Ismail Yahuza—613, McJewels J. Annan—155, Dankwah Smith Buttey—2,982, Rita Talata Asobayire—2,927, Edmond Oppong-Peprah—479, Kiston Akomeng Kissi—2,069, Derek Kwaku Nkansah—491, Michael Owari Wadie—1,635, Ken-Wuud Nuworsu—520, Alhaji Masawudu Osman—2,128 The Vice Chair positions were taken by; 1st Vice Chair: Dankwah Smith Buttey, 2nd Vice Chair: Rita Talata Asobayire and 3rd Vice Chair: Alhaji Masawudu Osman.
- Five contestants battled for the position of the General Secretary. The results are as follows; John Boadu—2524, Iddrisu Musah—104,Ramseyer Ahmed Agyeman-Prempeh—8, Frederick Opare Ansah—50,Justin Frimpong Kodua—2,837 With Justin Frimpong Kodua taking the position
- The National Treasurer had four individuals competing; Dr Charles Dwamena—2,917, Mary Posche-Oduro—1,303,Dr Yusif Tedam—125, Collins N. Nuamah—1,197. With Dr Charles Dwamena emerging as the winner
- Six people contested in the National Organiser position; Bright Essilfie Kumi—137, Seth Adu-Adjei—25, Daniel Nii Kwartey Titus-Glover—2274, Eric Amoako Twum—185, Henry Nana Boakye—2870, Nana Owusu Fordjour—44 With Henry Nana Boakye emerging as the winner.
- The National Youth Organiser had four persons; Abanga Fusani Yakubu—153, Salam Mohammed Mustapha—255, Prince Kamal Gumah—101, Michael Osei Boateng—120. With Salam Mohammed Mustapha emerging as the winner.
- The National Women's Organiser role had three people contesting; Kate Gyamfua—620, Ellen Ama Daaku—9, Hajia Sawadatu Saeed—32. With Kate Gyamfua taking it for the second time.
- The Nasara Coordinator position had Haruna Maiga—5, Abdul-Rahman Diallo—2, Issaku Muaza Kunata—199, Awal Mohammed—24, Sulemana Alhassan Atakpo—9, Abdul Aziz Haruna Futa—328. Also havig Abdul Aziz Haruna Futa emerging as the winner for the second time.

== Name and symbol ==
Flag of the New Patriotic Party with the elephant symbol in the centre

Founded on 28 July 1992, the party's mission is to unite citizens in the pursuit of freedom, justice, and the protection of human rights through true democracy. The New Patriotic Party (NPP) is a political party in Ghana that aligns with center-right and liberal conservative ideologies. Their symbol is an African elephant, and their official colors are red, white, and blue.

== Election results ==
=== Presidential elections ===
Election	Candidate	First round		Second round		Result
Election	Candidate	Votes	%	Votes	%	Result
1992	Albert Adu Boahen	1,204,764	30.3%	—		Lost ✗
1996	John Kufuor	2,834,878	39.7%	—		Lost ✗
2000	John Kufuor	3,131,739	48.17%	3,631,263	56.90%	Elected ✓
2004	John Kufuor	4,524,074	52.45%	—		Elected ✓
2008	Nana Akufo-Addo	4,159,439	49.13%	4,480,446	49.77%	Lost ✗
2012	Nana Akufo-Addo	5,248,898	47.74%	—		Lost ✗
2016	Nana Akufo-Addo	5,755,758	53.72%	—		Elected ✓
2020	Nana Akufo-Addo	6,730,413	51.30%	—		Elected ✓
2024	Mahamudu Bawumia	4,657,304	41.61%	—		Lost ✗

=== Parliamentary elections ===
Election	Votes	%	Seats	+/–	Position	Result
1992	Boycotted		0 / 200	Steady		Extra-parliamentary
1996	2,346,791	33.8%	61 / 200	▲61	▲2nd	Opposition
2000	2,949,767	44.9%	100 / 200	▲39	▲1st	Majority government
2004	4,268,120	49.0%	128 / 230	▲28	1st	Majority government
2008	4,013,013	46.9%	107 / 230	▼21	▼2nd	Opposition
2012	5,248,862	47.5%	122 / 275	▲15	2nd	Opposition
2016	4,713,277	52.5%	169 / 275	▲63	▲1st	Majority government
2020	6,651,028	50.4%	137 / 275	▼32	1st	NPP–Ind coalition government
2024	5,223,625	44.5%	88 / 276	▼49	▼2nd	Opposition

== See also ==
- Kufuor government
- Peter Mac Manu
- Dr J. B. Danquah
- J.B. Machator
- 2011 New Patriotic Party Primaries
- Malik Yakubu

Preceded by National Democratic Congress (Rawlings government)	Government of Ghana; New Patriotic Party (Kufuor government); 2001 – 2009	Succeeded by National Democratic Congress (Mills government)
Preceded by National Democratic Congress (Mahama government)	Government of Ghana; New Patriotic Party (Akufo-Addo government); 2017	Current holder
