= People's Heritage Party =

- Leader: Emmanuel Erskine
- Founded: 1992
- Merged into: People's Convention Party (with National Independence Party in 1993)
- Headquarters: Accra
- Ideology: Nkrumaism; African nationalism African socialism

The People's Heritage Party (PHP) was a political party in Ghana.

== Formation ==
The PHP was one of the eight political parties formed when the ban on party politics was lifted in 1992 in Ghana. It claimed to follow the Nkrumahist philosophy. One of the main supporters of the People`s Heritage Party was Mr Komla Agbeli Gbedemah who was a close associate of the founder of Ghana, Kwame Nkrumah

== Elections ==
The PHP did not win any seats in the Ghanaian parliamentary election in 1992. This was the first and only parliamentary election that it participated. Its candidate in the 1992 Ghanaian presidential election in 1992 was Lt. Gen. Emmanuel Erskine. He came last out of the five candidates with 1.7% of the total vote.

== Merger ==
In 1993, the PHP merged with the National Independence Party, another party that followed Nkrumah's ideology to form the People's Convention Party.

== See also ==
- Convention People's Party
