= Victoria Bright =

Ghanaian lawyer (born 1965)

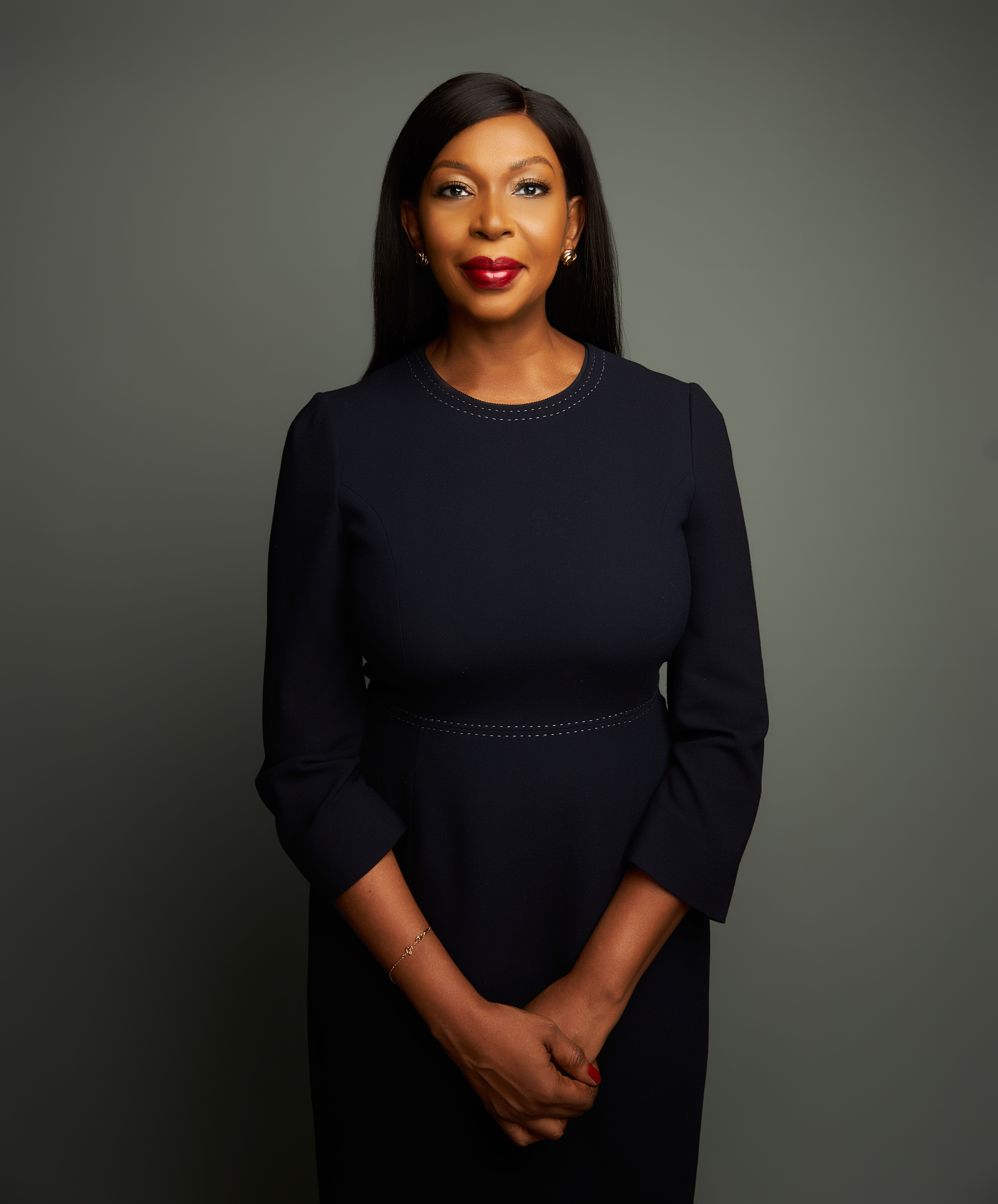
- Born: 16 March 1965; James Town, Accra, Ghana
- Other name: Vickie Bright
- Education: Wesley Girls SeniorHigh School; University of Sussex; University of Strasbourg; College of Europe, Bruges Balliol College, University of Oxford
- Occupations: Lawyer, Insolvency Practitioner, Entrepreneur and Philanthropist
- Years active: 1989–present
- Website: www.addisonbrightsloane.com

Victoria Bright, also known as Vickie Bright (born 16 March 1965), is a dual-qualified lawyer (England & Wales & Ghana) chartered insolvency practitioner, entrepreneur, and philanthropist. She was the deputy minister of state at the presidency in the John Kufuor administration and also the legal advisor to the president. She obtained an executive MBA with distinction from the Saïd Business School, University of Oxford. She is a scholar at Balliol College, University of Oxford. Bright is the first Ghanaian recipient of the University of Oxford's 30% Scholarship for Women.

== Law Practice and other work ==
Bright joined the legal profession in 1989 as a trainee solicitor with Taylor Wessing Solicitors in the City of London. She subsequently worked as a corporate lawyer in the Leeds office of Pinsent Masons Solicitors. Bright later joined the London office of DLA Piper Solicitors as a senior associate, where in 1999 she became the first black female partner. She is co-founder and managing partner of Addison Bright Sloane. Bright is also a senior advisor at Albright Stonebridge Group (now DGA Group)

== Notable appointments ==
Bright was appointed as legal advisor and subsequently also as minister of state at the Office of the President during John Kufuor’s Administration. During her tenure, She advised on/led significant projects, including Ghana's first sovereign bond issue, The Millennium Challenge Account, the development of the Mövenpick Ambassador Hotel, and the privatisation of Ghana Telecommunications (Ghana Telecom) and Western Telsystems Ghana Limited (WESTEL).

She was appointed as a board member of Ghana Telecoms. More recently, she served as a member of the advisory board of Ghana's Ministry of Lands and Natural Resources. She is a founding council member of the Ghana Association of Restructuring and Insolvency Advisors (GARIA) (now the Chartered Institute of Restructuring and Insolvency Practitioners (CIRIP). GARIA was instrumental in drafting Ghana's Companies’ Act, 2019 and the Corporate Insolvency and Restructuring Act, 2020. Bright currently serves on a number of boards, including Ashesi University, Africa Middle East Leasing (AMEL), which she chairs and MTN Mobile Money Limited (MTN MoMo)

== Philanthropy ==
Bright founded the Bright Minds Foundation, a non-profit organisation that provides support to voiceless and marginalised children to protect them from cruelty and abuse. Bright actively supports a number of charitable organisations.
