= Kwabena Boahen =

Ghanaian professor of engineering (born 1964)

- Born: Kwabena Adu Boahen; 22 September 1964 (age 61); Accra, Ghana
- Citizenship: Ghana / United States
- Education: Johns Hopkins University; Caltech; Mfantsipim School; Presbyterian Boys' Senior High School
- Known for: Bioengineering
- Father: Albert Adu Boahen
- Relatives: Charles Adu Boahen (brother)
- Scientific career
- Fields: Electronic Engineer
- Institutions: University of Pennsylvania; Stanford University
- Doctoral advisor: Carver Mead
- Website: profiles.stanford.edu/kwabena-boahen

Kwabena Adu Boahen (born 22 September 1964) (not to be confused with Kwabena Adu-Boahene, former Director of the National Signals Bureau in Ghana, who is no relation) is a Ghanaian-born Professor of Bioengineering and Electrical Engineering at Stanford University. He previously taught at the University of Pennsylvania. He is the son of celebrated Ghanaian historian and politician Professor Albert Adu Boahen.

== Education and early life ==
Kwabena Boahen was born on 22 September 1964, in Accra, Ghana. He attended secondary school at Mfantsipim School in Cape Coast, Ghana, and at the Presbyterian Boys' Senior High School in Accra. While at Mfantsipim, he invented the corn-planting machine that won the national science competition and graduated as the valedictorian of the Class of 1981.

He received his B.S. and M.S. in electrical engineering in 1989 from Johns Hopkins University and his PhD in computation and neural systems in 1997 from the California Institute of Technology, where he was advised by Carver Mead. For his PhD thesis, Boahen designed and fabricated a silicon chip emulating the functioning of the retina. Boahen's father, Albert Adu Boahen, was a professor of history at the University of Ghana and an advocate for democracy in Ghana.

== Career ==
After completing his PhD, Boahen joined the faculty of University of Pennsylvania, where he held the Skirkanich Term Junior Chair. In 2005, he moved to Stanford University and is currently the director of the Brains in Silicon Lab.

== Research ==
Boahen is widely regarded as one of the pioneers of neuromorphic engineering, a field founded by Carver Mead in the 1980s. In contrast to the field of artificial intelligence, which merely takes inspiration from the brain, neuromorphic engineers seek to develop a new computing paradigm based on the brain's organizing principles. The brain employs a computing paradigm that is fundamentally different from digital computers. Instead of using digital signals for computation as well as communication, the brain uses analog signals (i.e., graded dendritic potentials) for computation and digital signals (i.e., all-or-none axonal potentials) for communication. Having explored this unique hybrid of digital and analogue techniques over the past three decades, neuromorphic engineers are now beginning to understand and exploit its advantages. Their potential work applications include brain-machine interfaces, autonomous robots, and machine intelligence.

Boahen often speaks of the promise of efficient computing as an inspiration for his work, writing: "A typical room-size supercomputer weighs approximately 1,000 times more, occupies 10,000 times more space and consumes a millionfold more power than does the cantaloupe-size lump of neural tissue that makes up the brain."

With contributions in circuit design, chip architecture, and neuroscience, Boahen has brought together ideas from many disciplines to build novel computer chips that emulate the brain. Widely renowned for his engineering accomplishments, Boahen was named an IEEE fellow in 2016. Specific contributions throughout his career include the development of the current-mode subthreshold CMOS circuit design paradigm, the address-event approach to communicating spikes between neuromorphic chips, and the scalable design of multi-chip systems. Boahen's chips are mixed-mode: they employ analog circuits for computation and digital circuits for communication.

Boahen's work has demonstrated that neuromorphic computer chips are capable of reproducing many types of brain phenomena across a large range of scales. Examples include ion-channel dynamics (individual molecules), excitable membrane behavior (individual neurons), the orientation tuning of neurons in Visual Cortex (individual cortical columns), and neural synchrony (individual cortical areas). Utilizing these breakthroughs, Boahen's Stanford lab built the first neuromorphic system with one million spiking neurons (and billions of synapses). This system, Neurogrid, emulates networks of cortical neurons in real time while consuming only a few watts of power. In contrast, simulating one million interconnected cortical neurons in real-time using traditional super-computers requires as much power as several thousand households.

Boahen popularized the word retinomorphic, in reference to optical sensors inspired by biological retinae.

== Honors ==
- NIH Director's Pioneer Award, National Institute of Health (2006)
- Young Investigator Program, Office of Naval Research (2002–present)
- Faculty Early Career Program, National Science Foundation (2001–present)
- Fellowships in Science and Engineering, Packard Foundation (1999–2004)
