= Jerry Rawlings =

Leader of Ghana in 1979 and from 1981 to 2001

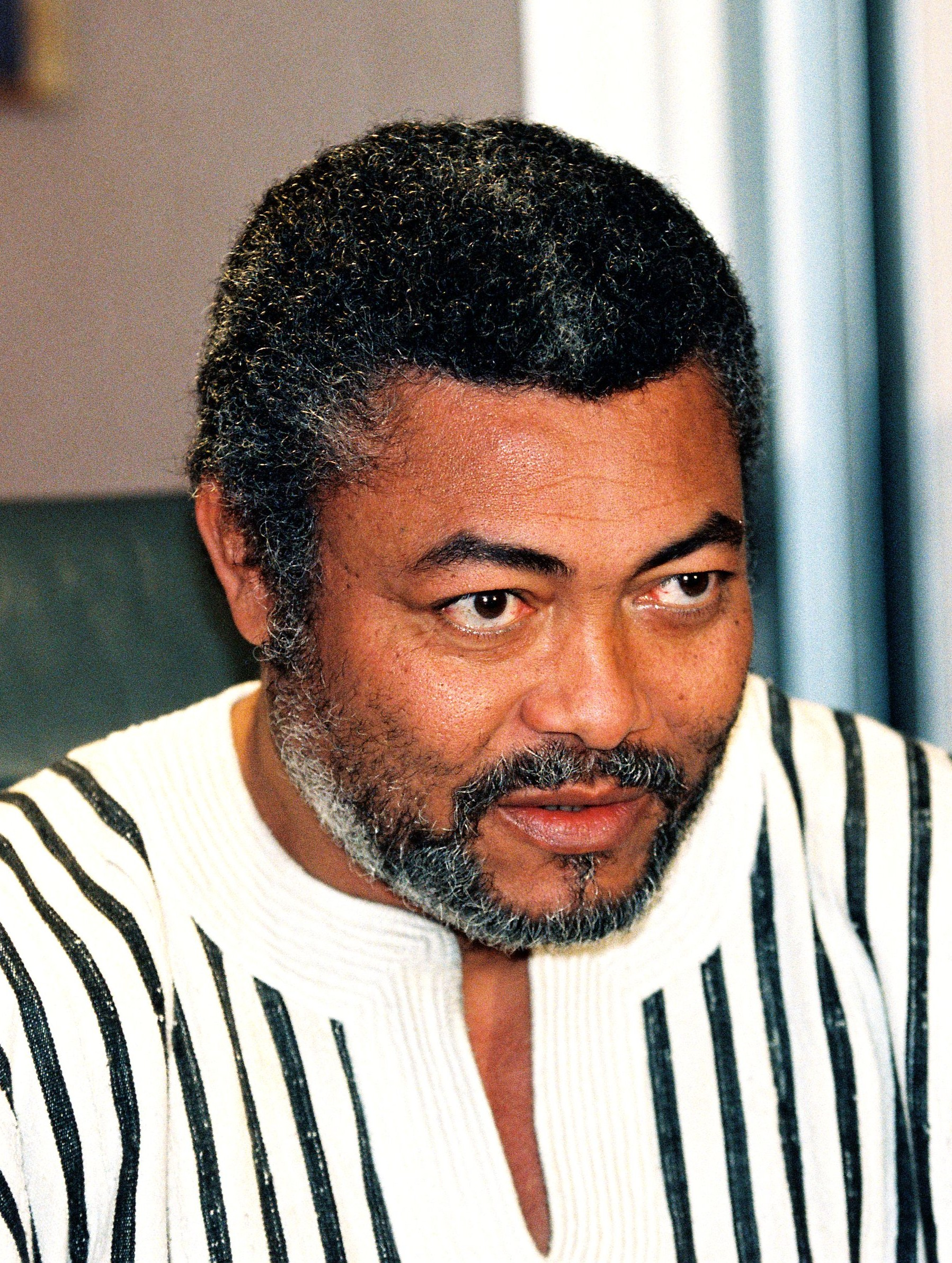
- Rawlings in 1998

9th President of Ghana
- In office 7 January 1993 – 7 January 2001
- Vice President: Kow Nkensen Arkaah (1993–1997); John Atta Mills (1997–2001)
- Preceded by: Himself (as Chairman of the PNDC)
- Succeeded by: John Kufuor

Chairman of the Provisional National Defence Council
- In office 31 December 1981 – 7 January 1993
- Vice President: Daniel Annan
- Preceded by: Hilla Limann (as President)
- Succeeded by: Himself (as President)

Chairman of the Armed Forces Revolutionary Council
- In office 4 June 1979 – 24 September 1979
- Vice President: Kojo Boakye-Djan
- Preceded by: Fred Akuffo
- Succeeded by: Hilla Limann (as President)

Personal details
- Born: Jerry Rawlings John; 22 June 1947 Accra, then part of the Colony of the Gold Coast
- Died: 12 November 2020 (aged 73) Accra, Ghana
- Resting place: Burma Camp
- Party: National Democratic Congress (after 1992)
- Spouse: Nana Konadu Agyeman (m. 1977)
- Children: 5
- Profession: Army officer
- Awards: UDS Honorary Award
- Nickname: Junior Jesus

Military service
- Branch/service: Ghana Air Force
- Years of service: 1968–1992
- Rank: Junior commissioned officer

Jerry John Rawlings (22 June 1947 – 12 November 2020) was a Ghanaian military officer, aviator, politician, and revolutionary who led the country briefly in 1979 and then from 1981 to 2001. He led a military regime until 1993 and then served two terms as the democratically elected president of Ghana. He was the longest-serving president in Ghana's history, presiding over the country for 19 years..

Rawlings came to power in Ghana as a flight lieutenant of the Ghana Air Force following a coup d'état in 1979. Before that, he led an unsuccessful coup attempt against the ruling military government on Tuesday, 15 May 1979, just five weeks before scheduled democratic elections were due. After handing power over to a civilian government, he overthrew the democratically elected Government through a military coup on Thursday, 31 December 1981, as the chairman of the Provisional National Defence Council (PNDC).

In 1992, Rawlings resigned from the military, founded the National Democratic Congress (NDC), and successfully ran for president in that year's election, becoming the first president of the Fourth Republic. Rawlings brokered a ceasefire in 1995 during the First Liberian Civil War. He was re-elected in 1996 to serve four more years. After two terms in office, the limit according to the Ghanaian Constitution, Rawlings endorsed his vice-president John Atta Mills as a presidential candidate in 2000, though Mills lost the election. Rawlings served as the African Union envoy to Somalia. He died in 2020 at age 73 and was accorded a state funeral.

He led Ghana through economic restructuring in the 1980s and 1990s and oversaw the country’s transition from military rule to multi-party democracy. His rule and legacy have been described as both influential and controversial, with scholars noting both his role in political and economic reforms and criticisms relating to political violence and authoritarian practices.

== Background ==
Rawlings was born Jerry Rawlings John on Sunday, 22 June 1947, in Accra, Ghana, to Victoria Agbotui, an Anlo Ewe from Dzelukope, Keta, and James Ramsey John, a British chemist from Castle Douglas in Kirkcudbrightshire, Scotland. His father, who never lived with him and his mother, went back to Britain in 1959. Rawlings attended Achimota School and a military academy at Teshie. Rawlings was married to Nana Konadu Agyeman, whom he met while at Achimota College. They had three daughters: Zanetor Rawlings, Yaa Asantewaa Rawlings, and Amina Rawlings, and a son, Kimathi Rawlings. Junior Agogo was the nephew of Rawlings. Nathalie Yamb alleges that her son, born 1999, was fathered by Rawlings.

=== Education and military career ===
Rawlings finished his secondary education at Achimota College in 1967. He joined the Ghana Air Force shortly afterwards. On his application, the military switched his surname John and his middle name Rawlings to John Rawlings. In March 1968, he was posted to Takoradi in Ghana's Western Region, to continue his studies. He graduated in January 1969 and was commissioned as a pilot officer, winning the coveted "Speed Bird Trophy" as the best cadet in flying the Su-7 ground attack supersonic jet aircraft as he was skilled in aerobatics. He earned the rank of flight lieutenant in April 1978. During his service with the Ghana Air Force, Rawlings perceived a deterioration in discipline and morale due to corruption in the Supreme Military Council (SMC). As promotion brought him into contact with the privileged classes and their social values, his view of the injustices in society hardened. He was thus regarded with some unease by the SMC. After the 1979 coup, he involved himself with the student community of the University of Ghana, where he developed a more leftist ideology through reading and discussion of social and political ideas.

== 1979 coup and purges ==
Rawlings grew discontented with Ignatius Kutu Acheampong's government, which had come to power through a coup in January 1972. Acheampong was accused not only of corruption but also of maintaining Ghana's dependency on pre-colonial powers, in a situation which led to economic decline and impoverishment.

Rawlings was part of the Free Africa Movement, an underground movement of military officers who wanted to unify Africa through a series of coups. On Tuesday, 15 May 1979, five weeks before civilian elections, Rawlings and six other soldiers staged a coup against the government of General Fred Akuffo, but failed and were arrested by the military. Rawlings was publicly sentenced to death in a General Court Martial and imprisoned, although his statements on the social injustices that motivated his actions won him civilian sympathy. While awaiting execution, Rawlings was sprung from custody on Monday, 4 June 1979, by a group of soldiers. Claiming that the government was corrupt beyond redemption and that new leadership was required for Ghana's development, he led the group in a coup to oust the Akuffo Government and Supreme Military Council. Shortly afterwards, Rawlings established and became the Chairman of a 15-member Armed Forces Revolutionary Council (AFRC), primarily composed of junior officers. He and the AFRC governed for 112 days and arranged the execution by firing squad of eight military officers, including Generals Kotei, Joy Amedume, Roger Felli, and Utuka, as well as the three former Ghanaian heads of state: Acheampong, Akuffo, and Akwasi Afrifa.

These executions were dramatic events in the history of Ghana, which had previously suffered few instances of political violence. Rawlings later implemented a much wider "house-cleaning exercise" involving the killings and abduction of over 300 Ghanaians. Elections were held on time shortly after the coup. On Monday, 24 September 1979, power was peacefully handed over by Rawlings to President Hilla Limann, whose People's National Party (PNP) had the support of Nkrumah's followers. Two years later, on 31 December 1981, Rawlings ousted President Hilla Limann in a coup d'état, claiming that civilian rule was weak and the country's economy was deteriorating. The killings of the Supreme Court justices Cecilia Koranteng-Addow, Frederick Sarkodie, and Kwadjo Agyei Agyepong), military officers Major Sam Acquah and Major Dasana Nantogmah also occurred during the second military rule of Rawlings. However, unlike the 1979 executions, these persons were abducted and killed in secret, and it is unclear who was behind their murders, though Joachim Amartey Kwei and four others, namely Lance Corporal Amedeka, Michael Senyah, Tekpor Hekli and Johnny Dzandu, were convicted of murdering the Justices and Acquah and were executed in 1982 with the exception of Corporal Amedaka, who was able to escape from the country in a prison break.

== 1981 coup and reforms ==
Believing the Limann administration was unable to resolve Ghana's neocolonial economic dependency, Rawlings led a second coup against Limann and indicted the entire political class on 31 December 1981. In place of Limann's People's National Party, Rawlings established the Provisional National Defence Council (PNDC) military junta as the official government.

Rawlings hosted state visits from revolutionaries from other countries, including Dési Bouterse (Suriname), Daniel Ortega (Nicaragua), and Sam Nujoma (Namibia). More famously, Rawlings reversed Limann's boycott of Gaddafi's Libya, allowing the Black Stars to compete in the 1982 African Cup of Nations. The team won the AFCON trophy for the fourth time, their last win as of 2026.

Although the PNDC claimed to be representative of the people, it lacked experience in the creation and implementation of clear economic policies. Rawlings, like many of his predecessors, attributed current economic and social problems to the "trade malpractices and other anti-social activities" of a few business people. In December 1982, the PNDC announced its four-year economic program of establishing a state monopoly on export-import trade to eliminate corruption surrounding import licenses and shifting trade away from dependency on Western markets. Unrealistic price controls were imposed on the market and enforced through coercive acts, especially against business people. This resolve to employ state control over the economy which is best demonstrated by the destruction of the Makola No.1 Market. The PNDC established Workers' Defence Committees (WDCs) and People's Defence Committees (PDCs) to mobilize the population to support radical changes to the economy. Price controls on the sale of food were beneficial to urban workers but placed undue burden on 70% of the rural population whose income largely depended on the prices of agricultural products. Rawlings' economic policies led to economic crisis in 1983, forcing him to undertake structural adjustment and submit himself to an election to retain power. Elections were held in January 1992, leading Ghana back to multiparty democracy.

== 1992 elections ==
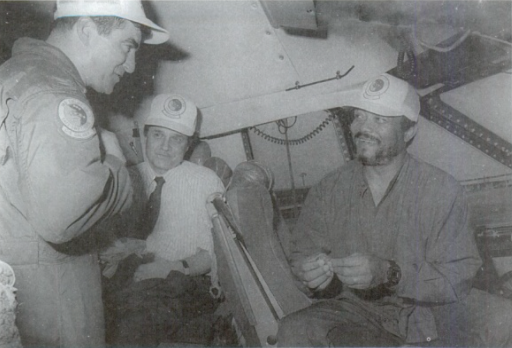
President Rawlings (right) with United States Ambassador Kenneth L. Brown (centre) and a United States Air Force crewman in 1995

Rawlings established the National Commission on Democracy (NCD) shortly after the 1982 coup, and employed it to survey civilian opinion and make recommendations that would facilitate the process of democratic transition. In March, 1991, the NCD released a report recommending the election of an executive president, the establishment of a national assembly, and the creation of the post of prime minister. The PNDC used NCD recommendations to establish a committee for the drafting of a new constitution based on past Ghanaian Constitutions that lifted the ban on political parties in May 1992 after it was approved by referendum.

On Friday, 3 November 1992, election results compiled by the INEC from 200 constituencies showed that Rawlings' NDC had won 60% of the votes and had obtained the majority needed to prevent a second round of voting. More specifically, the NDC won 62% in the Brong-Ahafo region, 93% in the Volta region, and the majority votes in the Upper West, Upper East, Western, Northern, Central, and Greater Accra regions. His opponents, Professor Adu Boahen, won 31% of the votes, former President Hilla Limann won 6.8%, Kwabena Darko won 2.9%, and Emmanuel Erskine won 1.7%. Voter turnout was 50%.

The ability of opposition parties to compete was limited by the vast advantages Rawlings possessed. Rawlings' victory was aided by the various party structures that were integrated into society during his rule, called the "organs of the revolution". These structures included the Committees for the Defence of the Revolution (CDRs), Commando Units, 31 December Women's Organization, the 4 June movement, Peoples Militias, and Mobisquads, and operated on a system of popular control through intimidation. Rawlings held a monopoly over national media and was able to censor print and electronic media through a PNDC newspaper licensing decree, PNDC Law 221. Moreover, Rawlings imposed a 20,000 Cedis (about $400) cap on campaign contributions, which made national publicity of opposition parties virtually impossible. Rawlings himself began campaigning before the official unbanning of political parties and had access to state resources and was able to effectively meet all monetary demands required of a successful campaign. Rawlings travelled across the country, initiating public-works projects and giving public employees a 60% pay rise prior to election day.

Opposition parties objected to the election results, citing incidences of vote stuffing in regions where Rawlings was likely to lose and in rural areas with scant populations, as well as a bloated voters' register and a partisan electoral commission. However, the Commonwealth Observer Group, led by Sir Ellis Clarke, approved of the election as "free and fair", as there were very few issues at polling stations and no major incidences of voter coercion. In contrast, the International Foundation for Electoral Systems (IFES) issued a report supporting claims that erroneous entries in voter registration could have affected election results. The Carter Center did acknowledge minor electoral issues but did not see these problems as indicative of systematic electoral fraud.

Opposition parties boycotted subsequent Ghana parliamentary and presidential elections, and the unicameral National Assembly, of which NDC officials won 189 of 200 seats and essentially established a one-party parliament that lacked legitimacy and only had limited legislative powers. After the disputed election, the PNDC was transformed into the National Democratic Congress (NDC).

Rawlings took office on Thursday, 7 January 1993, the same day that the new constitution came into effect, and the government became known as the Fourth Republic of Ghana.

== Policies and reforms ==
Rawlings established the Economic Recovery Program (ERP) suggested by the World Bank and the International Monetary Fund in 1982 due to the poor state of the economy after 18 months of attempting to govern it through administrative controls and mass mobilization. The policies implemented caused a dramatic currency devaluation, the removal of price controls, and social-service subsidies which favoured farmers over urban workers, and privatization of some state-owned enterprises, and restraints on government spending. Funding was provided by bilateral donors, reaching US$800 million in 1987 and 1988, and US$900 million in 1989.

Between 1992 and 1996, Rawlings eased control over the judiciary and civil society, allowing a more independent Supreme Court and the publication of independent newspapers. Opposition parties operated outside of parliament and held rallies and press conferences.

== 1996 elections ==
Given the various issues with the 1992 elections, the 1996 elections were a great improvement in terms of electoral oversight. Voter registration was re-compiled, with close to 9.2 million voters registering at nearly 19,000 polling stations, which the opposition had largely approved after party agents had reviewed the lists. The emphasis on transparency led Ghanaian non-governmental organizations to create the Network of Domestic Election Observers (NEDEO), which trained nearly 4,100 local poll watchers. This organization was popular across political parties and civic groups. On the day of the election, more than 60,000 candidate agents monitored close to all polling sites, and were responsible for directly reporting results to their respective party leaders. The parallel vote-tabulation system allowed polling sites to compare their results to the official ones released by the Electoral commission. The Inter-Party Advisory Committee (IPAC) was established to discuss election preparations with all parties and the Electoral Commission, as well as establish procedures to investigate and resolve complaints. Presidential and parliamentary elections were held on the same day and see-through boxes were used in order to further ensure the legitimacy of the elections. Despite some fears of electoral violence, the election was peaceful and had a 78% turnout rate, and was successful with only minor problems such as an inadequate supply of ink and parliamentary ballots.

The two major contenders of the 1996 election were Rawlings' NDC, and John Kufuor's Great Alliance, an amalgamation of the New Patriotic Party (NPP) and the People's Convention Party (PCP). The Great Alliance based their platform on ousting Rawlings, and attacked the incumbent government for its poor fiscal policies. However, they were unable to articulate a clear positive message of their own, or plans to change the current economic policy. As Ghana was heavily dependent on international aid, local leaders had minimal impact on the economy. The Electoral Commission reported that Rawlings had won by 57%, with Kufuor obtaining 40% of the vote. Results by district were similar to those in 1992, with the opposition winning the Ashanti Region and some constituencies in Eastern and Greater Accra, and Rawlings winning in his ethnic home, the Volta Region, and faring well in every other region. The NDC took 134 seats in the Assembly compared to the opposition's 66, and the NPP took 60 seats in the parliament.

== Post-military ==
The 1992 constitution limits a president to two terms, even if they are nonconsecutive. Rawlings did not attempt to amend the document to allow him to run for a third term in 2000. He retired in 2001 and was succeeded by John Kufuor, his main rival and opponent in 1996. It was the first time in Ghanaian history that a sitting government peacefully transferred power to an elected member of the opposition.

Kufuor won the presidency after defeating Rawlings' vice-president John Atta Mills in a runoff in 2000. In 2004, Mills conceded to Kufuor after another election between the two.

== Post-presidency ==
In November 2000, Rawlings was named the first International Year of Volunteers 2001 Eminent Person by UN Secretary-General Kofi Annan, attending various events and conferences to promote volunteerism.

In October 2010, Rawlings was named as the African Union envoy to Somalia. In November 2010, he attended the inauguration of Dési Bouterse as President of Suriname, and took a tour of the country. He was especially interested in the Ghanaian origins of the Maroon people.

Rawlings delivered lectures at universities, including Oxford University in England. Rawlings continued his heavy support for NDC. In July 2019, he went on a three-day working trip to Burkina Faso in the capacity of Chairman of the Thomas Sankara Memorial Committee.

In September 2019, he led the Ghanaian governmental delegation to the funeral of Robert Mugabe, the late former president of Zimbabwe.

== Death and state funeral ==
Rawlings died on 12 November 2020 at Korle-Bu Teaching Hospital in Accra, a week after having been admitted for a "short-term illness". According to some reports, his death was caused by complications from COVID-19. His death came nearly two months after that of his mother, Victoria Agbotui, on 24 September 2020. President Nana Akufo-Addo declared a seven-day period of mourning in his honor and flags flown at half-mast. His family members appealed to the Government of Ghana to bury him in Keta in the Volta Region. A schedule for the signing of a book of condolence was opened in his memory. His funeral, originally planned for 23 December 2020, was postponed at the request of his family.

=== State burial ===
From 24 to 27 January 2021, funeral ceremonies were organised at Accra in Rawlings' memory. A requiem mass for Jerry John Rawlings was held at the Holy Spirit Cathedral on 24 January 2021, followed by a vigil at the Air Force Officers' Mess in Accra later that evening. His body was laid in state in the foyer of the Accra International Conference Centre from 25 to 26 January 2021. There were also traditional rites performed by the Anlo Ewe people of his maternal ancestry. On 27 January 2021, a state funeral, attended by national and international political leaders, paramount chiefs, diplomats and other dignitaries, was held at the Black Star Square before his burial service at the Military Cemetery at Burma Camp, with full military honours, including a slow march by the funeral cortège, a flypast of a Ghana Air Force helicopter, the sounding of the Last Post by army buglers and a 21-gun salute.

== Awards and honours ==
- July 1984: the Order of Jose Marti by the Cuban leader Fidel Castro.
- October 2013: Honorary degree (Doctorate of Letters) from the University for Development Studies in northern Ghana.
  - This award recognised Rawlings's contribution to the establishment of the university. In 1993, he used his US$50,000 Hunger Project cash prize as seed money to sponsor the establishment of the state-owned university (founded in May 1992), the first of its kind in the three Northern regions of Ghana.
- October 2013: the Global Champion for People's Freedom award bestowed the Mkiva Humanitarian Foundation.
- August 2014: Doctor of Letters, Honoris Causa.
- August 2018: Marcus Garvey Awards.
- December 2018: Enstooled as the Togbuiga Nutifafa I of Anlo, a development chief in the Ghanaian chieftaincy system.
- December 2021: the book, 'J.J RAWLINGS: MEMORIES AND MEMENTOS' written to honor him by the Pan-African Writers Association.

== Legacy ==
President Nana Akufo-Addo proposed to the Governing Council of UDS to rename the institution after Jerry Rawlings, who used his US$50,000 Hunger Project prize as seed money to establish the university. This suggestion was accepted by his family.

A foundation called the JJ Rawlings Foundation was named after him led by his children, Madam Yaa Asantewaa Agyeman-Rawlings and Madam Amina Agyeman-Rawlings.

In May 2025, the government of Burkina Faso named a street in Ouagadougou after him. The signage on the road reads "Avenue Flt Lt Jerry John Rawlings, Ancien President du Ghana, ne le 22/06/1947 - dcd le 12/11/2020". The naming of the street was done on the same day a monument was unveiled in memory of his assassinated friend and former Burkinabe leader, Thomas Sankara.

Political offices
Preceded by Fred Akuffo	Head of state of Ghana; 1979	Succeeded by Hilla Limann
Preceded by Hilla Limann	Head of state of Ghana; 1981–1993	Succeeded by Constitutional Rule
Preceded by Constitutional rule re-established in Ghana	President of Ghana; 1993–2001	Succeeded by John Kufuor
Preceded by Nicéphore Soglo	Chairman of the Economic Community of West African States; 1994–1996	Succeeded by Sani Abacha
Military offices
Preceded by Joseph Nunoo-Mensah	Chief of the Defence Staff; November 1982 – August 1983	Succeeded by Arnold Quainoo
Party political offices
New title	National Democratic Congress presidential candidate 1992, 1996	Succeeded by John Atta Mills
