= Albert Adu Boahen =

Ghanaian politician and historian (1932–2006)

Albert Kwadwo Adu Boahen
- Born: 24 May 1932; Oseim, Eastern Province, Gold Coast (now in Eastern Region, Ghana)
- Died: 24 May 2006 (aged 74); Accra, Greater Accra Region, Ghana
- Citizenship: Ghanaian
- Education: University of Ghana; School of Oriental and African Studies; Mfantsipim School
- Known for: New Patriotic Party presidential candidate in 1992
- Children: Kwabena Boahen; Charles Adu Boahen
- Scientific career
- Fields: African history
- Institutions: University of Ghana, 1959–1990 professor since 1971

Albert Kwadwo Adu Boahen (24 May 1932 – 24 May 2006) was a Ghanaian academic, historian, and politician. He was an academic at the University of Ghana from 1959 to 1990, from 1971 onwards as a professor. As a politician, he notably was a candidate in the 1992 Ghanaian presidential election, representing the main opposition New Patriotic Party.

== Career ==
=== Academia ===
Boahen was born in Oseim to Presbyterian parents and had his ancestral roots in Juaben in the Ashanti Region. He attended religious schools between 1938 and 1947. He went to Mfantsipim School in Cape Coast before going to the University College of the Gold Coast, now University of Ghana, Legon, to study history. He graduated in 1956. In 1959 he was the first Ghanaian to receive a Ph.D. in African history from the School of Oriental and African Studies in London.

He was employed at the University of Ghana in 1959, and was a professor from 1971 to his retirement in 1990. He chaired the Department of History there from 1967 to 1975, as the first African to do so, and was a dean from 1973 to 1975. During this period he was married to Jane Thyra Boahen, with whom he had 4 children: Cynara, Kwabena, Charles and Christopher.

Professor Adu Boahen also served on the editorial board of The Journal of African History published by Cambridge University Press, and was a visiting scholar at such institutions as the Australian National University in 1969, Columbia University in 1970 and the State University of New York in 1990 and 1991. Between 1993 and 1999, he also worked in the UNESCO committee that published the eight-volume work General History of Africa.

=== Politics ===
Boahen's academic work crossed over into politics. In February 1988 he publicly lectured on the history of Ghana from 1972 to 1987. Because of this, he is credited with breaking the so-called "culture of silence" which marked the regime of President Jerry Rawlings, who had served continuously since 1981. The lectures, originally held in the British Council Hall in Accra, were published in 1998 as The Ghanaian Sphinx: The Contemporary History of Ghana 1972–1987.

In 1990 he co-founded the Movement for Freedom and Justice, and served as its first chairman. The ban on political parties in Ghana was lifted in 1992. In the subsequent 1992 presidential election, Boahen was the New Patriotic Party (NPP) nominee, with Roland Issifu Alhassan as his running mate for vice president. Boahen lost to Jerry Rawlings, but received 30.4% of the vote. Due to dissatisfaction with alleged ballot rigging in that election, Boahen boycotted the 1992 parliamentary election. In the 1996 presidential election, John Kufuor stood instead as the candidate for the NPP and fared somewhat better than Boahen, receiving 39.6% of the vote. In 1998, Boahen tried to return as the New Patriotic Party's presidential nominee, but Kufour was chosen instead. Ultimately, Kufour won the 2000 presidential election and became president.

Boahen spoke out against Marxist history early in his career. Politically, he described himself as "a liberal democrat, a believer in the freedom of the individual, the welfare of the governed, and in private enterprise and the market economy".

== Legacy and death ==
Boahen was a member of the Ghana Academy of Arts and Sciences, and in 2003 a Festschrift entitled Ghana in Africa and the World was published, edited by Toyin Falola. UNESCO awarded him the Avicenna Silver Medal.

Boahen died on 24 May 2006, his 74th birthday. He was survived by his wife Mary Adu Boahen, who he had married after his divorce from his first wife Jane Thyra Boahen, and his five children. Jerry Rawlings was among the mourners who paid a visit to his family. He was honoured with a state funeral, and in June 2006 was posthumously awarded the Order of the Star of Ghana. John Kufour inaugurated a National Honours Day on 30 June, and several others were awarded the Order. His roots can be traced down to Osiem, a village in the Eastern Region of Ghana where his place of residence has been given the area council building.

His son Charles Adu Boahen, a former Wall Street investment banker and finance professional, was appointed deputy minister of finance in Ghana in 2017 by President Nana Addo Akufo-Addo. Charles served in the Akufo-Addo government for 5 years before he was removed from the position for allegations of corruption following the release of sting undercover video by the controversial Ghanaian investigative journalist, Anas Aremeyaw Anas. He was subsequently cleared of those charges after an investigation by Ghana's Office of the Special Prosecutor. Another son of his, Kwabena Boahen is a well respected Professor of Bioengineering and Electrical Engineering at the prestigious Stanford University in California, USA. He founded the Brains in Silicon Lab at Stanford, pursuing a long held interest in neural networks and neuromorphic engineering.

In 2023 the Adu Boahen Memorial Library and Archive, which also houses thousands of books and academic writings from the personal collection of the late Professor, was opened at the University of Ghana's history department. This library was built by the Adu Boahen Foundation, a charitable organisation set up and funded by his children in the late Professor's honour, and handed over to the University.

== Partial bibliography ==
- Britain, the Sahara and the Western Sudan 1788–1861. London/Oxford, 1964 (dissertation).
- Topics in West African History. Harlow/London, 1966.
- Ghana: Evolution and Change in the 19th and 20th Centuries. London, 1975.
- The Revolutionary Years: West Africa Since 1800. Accra/London, 1975.
- "Politics in Ghana, 1800–1874", in J. F. Ade Ajayi and Michael Crowder, History of West Africa. London, 1977 (3rd edition), Vol. 2, pp. 167–260.
- African Perspectives on Colonialism. Baltimore, 1987.
- The Ghanaian Sphinx: Reflections on the Contemporary History of Ghana, 1972–1987. Accra, 1989.
- Mfantsipim and the making of Ghana: A Centenary History, 1876–1976. Accra, 1996.
- Yaa Asantewaa and the Asante–British War of 1900–1. Accra, 2003.
- Africa in the Twentieth Century: The Adu Boahen Reader. Trenton, NJ, 2005.
- With J. B. Webster and H. O. Idowu: The Revolutionary Years: West Africa since 1800. London, 1980.

Party political offices
First	New Patriotic Party presidential nominee 1992	Succeeded by John Kufuor
