= Bright Botchway =

Ghanaian politician (b. 1985)

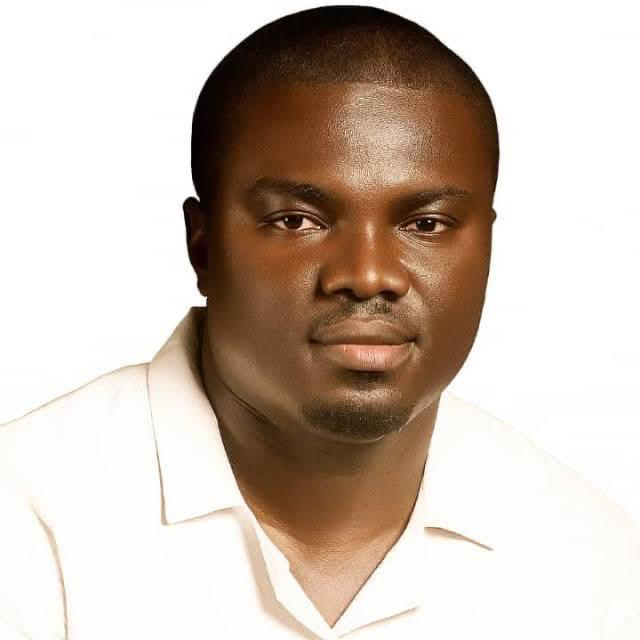

Personal details
- Born: Bright Botchway; 18 February 1985 (age 41)
- Party: National Democratic Congress
- Education: University of Cape Coast (BBA) & University of Education Winneba (SC)
- Occupation: Entrepreneur

Bright Botchway (born February 18, 1985) is a Ghanaian political figure and entrepreneur known for his contributions to the National Democratic Congress (NDC) and his business ventures. He is the National Deputy Coordinator for the Traders and Artisans Network within the NDC and holds the position of CEO at Edigo Business Brokers and Edigo Limited.

== Early life and education ==
Born on February 18, 1985, Botchway attended Nsaba Presby School at the primary level, Agona Swedru secondary school at the Senior High school level. Bright Botchway advanced his education in strategic communication and business. He earned a Master of Arts in Strategic Communication from the University of Education, Winneba (UEW), and a Bachelor of Business Administration in Marketing from Perez University College, which is affiliated with the University of Cape Coast (UCC). in addition to his academic achievements, Botchway obtained a Certificate in Cyber Security in 2025 from Presbyterian University. He also completed an Advanced Programme in International Law, Diplomacy, and Security in 2025 at the University of Gold Coast

== Political career ==
Botchway advocacies for tertiary education rights and employment opportunities.

In his current role as National Deputy Coordinator for the Traders and Artisans Network, Botchway aims to support the NDC's mission and values, driving positive change and community development.

He is the Technical Committee Secretary for the Government of Ghana’s flagship initiative, the Adwumawura Programme.

Botchway's engagement in politics began at an early age and has included various leadership roles:

- Branch Youth Organizer at Presby JHS, Agona East (2009-2012)
- Vice President and later President of the Tertiary Education Institutions Network (TEIN) (2013-2015)
- Communication Officer in Gomoa East (2014-2018)
- Regional Communications Member in the Central Region (2016-2018)
- General Secretary of the Young Cadres Association (YCA) (2015-2016)
- Political Aide to H.E. Kwesi Ahwoi
- Deputy Regional Youth Organizer in the Central Region (2018-2022)

== Business ventures ==
In addition to his political career, Botchway is an entrepreneur, CEO of Edigo Business Brokers and Edigo Limited. Botchway is the founder of the BB Humanity Foundation, a non-governmental organization dedicated to youth empowerment, gender advocacy, women’s rights, education support, and humanitarian assistance for vulnerable groups such as street children, teen mothers, and the aged. He is pursuing a Bachelor of Laws (LLB) degree at Kings University College, an institution affiliated with the University of Cape Coast (UCC).
