= People's Convention Party =

- President: Festus Busia
- Chairman: Jojo ayensu aikins
- Spokesperson: kwame attah
- Founded: 1992
- Dissolved: 1996
- Merger of: People's Heritage Party; National Independence Party & People's National Convention (faction)
- Merged into: Convention People's Party (with National Convention Party) in 1996
- Headquarters: Accra
- Youth wing: Gum
- Ideology: Nkrumaism; Ghanaian nationalism Left-wing nationalism Socialism; Anti-imperialism; Pan-africanism

The People's Convention Party is a former political party in Ghana.

It merged with the National Convention Party in 1996 and became the reformed Convention People's Party.
