= 1992 Ghanaian presidential election =

← 1979	3 November 1992	1996 →
- Turnout: 50.16%
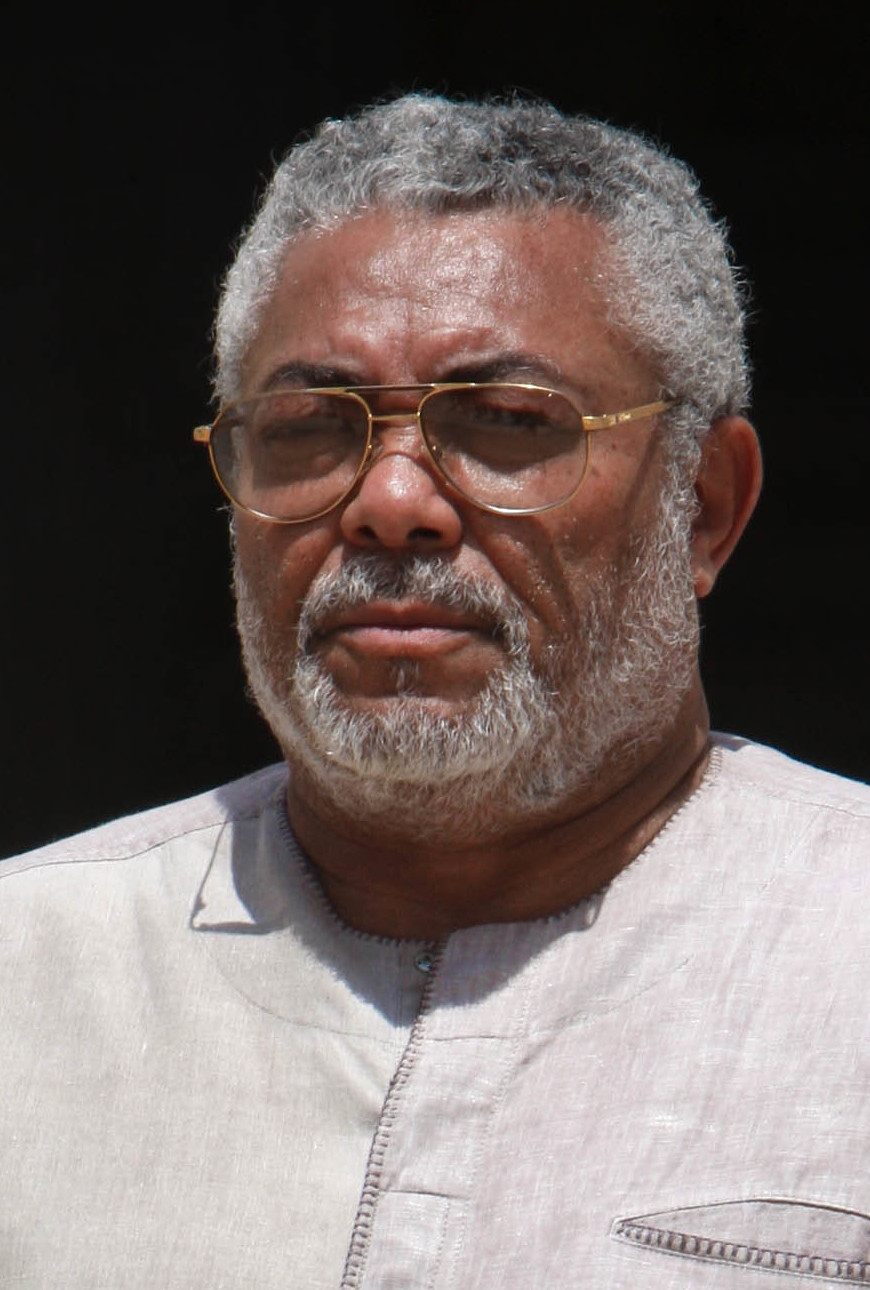

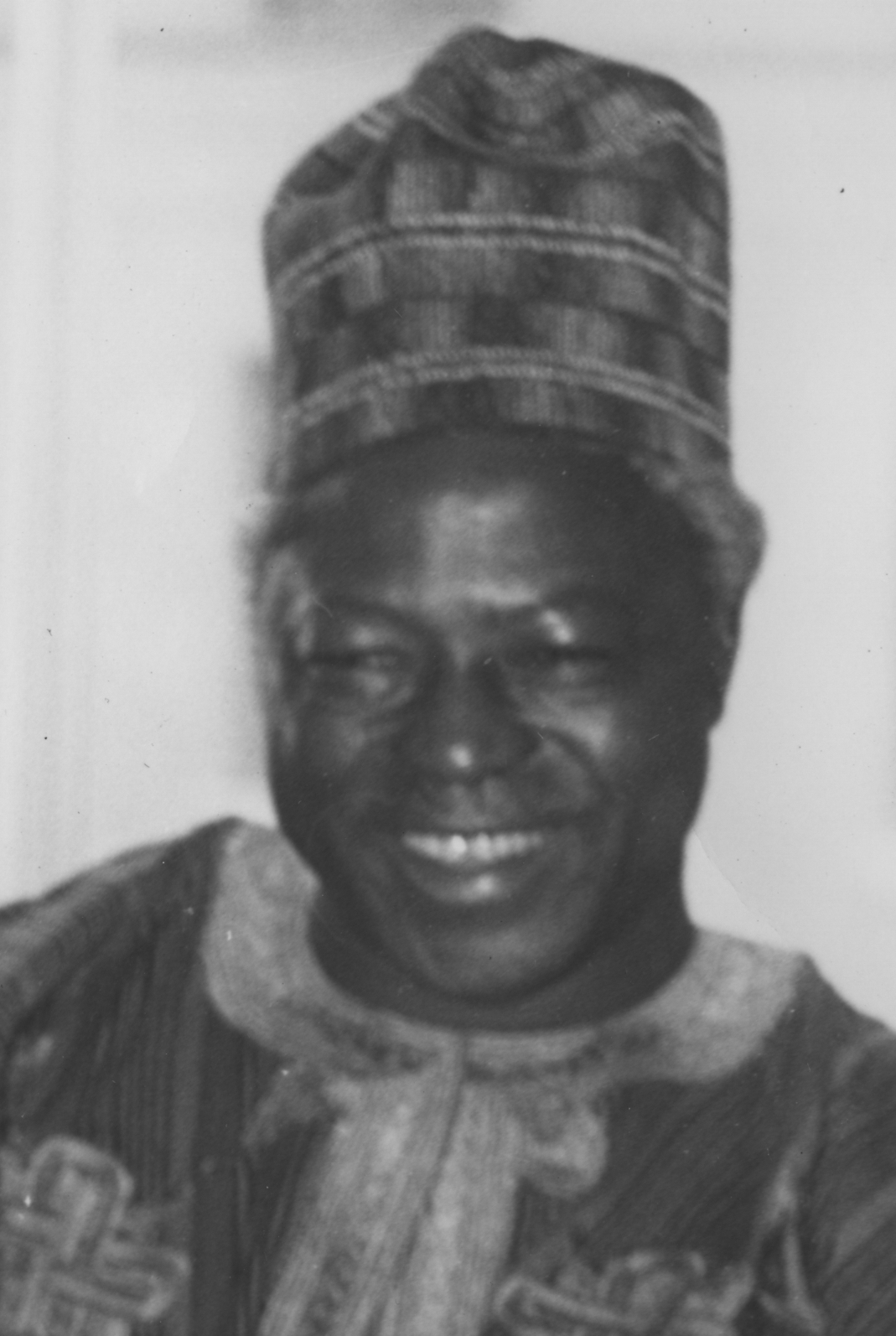
Nominee	Jerry Rawlings	Albert Adu Boahen	Hilla Limann
Party	NDC	NPP	PNC
Alliance	Progressive Alliance	—	—
Popular vote	2,323,135	1,204,764	266,710
Percentage	58.40%	30.29%	6.70%
Elected President
Jerry Rawlings
NDC

Presidential elections were held in Ghana on 3 November 1992. They were the first contested elections held in the country since 1979, and only the fourth contested elections of any sort since the country gained independence in 1957.

Jerry Rawlings, who had led the country since taking power in a 1981 coup, had grudgingly agreed to hold multiparty elections earlier in the year. Rawlings ran as the candidate of the Progressive Alliance, which included his National Democratic Congress, and won 58.4% of the vote, enough to win without the need for a runoff. Voter turnout was 50.2%.

The opposition accused Rawlings and his supporters of engaging in massive fraud, including ballot-box stuffing and altering results after they were certified. Nonetheless, international observers pronounced the elections free and fair.

== Results ==
Candidate	Party	Votes	%
Jerry Rawlings	Progressive Alliance (NDC–NCP–EGLE)	2,323,135	58.40
Albert Adu Boahen	New Patriotic Party	1,204,764	30.29
Hilla Limann	People's National Convention	266,710	6.70
Kwabena Darko	National Independence Party	113,629	2.86
Emmanuel Erskine	People's Heritage Party	69,827	1.76
Total		3,978,065	100.00
Valid votes		3,978,065	96.37
Invalid/blank votes		149,811	3.63
Total votes		4,127,876	100.00
Registered voters/turnout		8,229,902	50.16
Source: Nohlen et al.
