= Nkrumaism =

African socialist political ideology

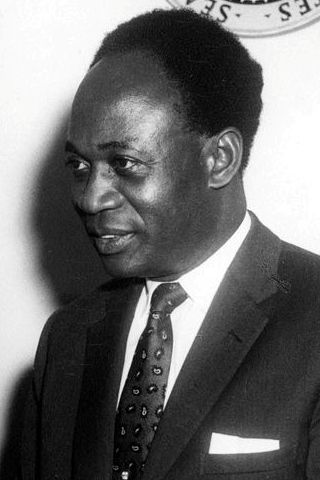
Kwame Nkrumah, after whom Nkrumaism is named

Nkrumaism (sometimes Consciencism) is an African socialist political ideology based on the thinking and writing of Kwame Nkrumah. A pan-Africanist and socialist, Nkrumah served as Prime Minister of the Gold Coast (later Ghana) from 1952 until 1960 and subsequently as President of Ghana before being deposed by the National Liberation Council in 1966.

== Definition ==
Nkrumaism is a pan-African socialist theory which aims to adapt Marxist–Leninist theory to the social context of the African continent. Nkrumah defined his belief system as "the ideology of a New Africa, independent and absolutely free from imperialism, organized on a continental scale, founded upon the conception of one and united Africa, drawing its strength from modern science and technology and from the traditional African belief that the free development of each is the condition for the free development of all." The Convention People's Party (CPP), founded by Nkrumah in 1949, writes "Nkrumaism simply means Self Reliance, African is capable of managing his own affairs. The values CPP stands for or the guiding principles of Nkrumaism today are those which have guided it throughout its existence. Social justice, Pan-Africanism, Self Determination, African Personality, Anti-Imperialism."

Nkrumaism is a syncretic ideology which blends different sources together while not necessarily borrowing their entire frameworks. In his work, Nkrumah blended different sources from within Africa, the canon of Western philosophy, and Black intellectuals in North America and Europe, like Marcus Garvey and George Padmore. Particularly important in founding this ideology were his study and meetings with C. L. R. James, W. E. B. Du Bois and Father Divine. Aside from the Marxist–Leninist framework, this blending of ideas largely only took bits and pieces of other philosophical systems, and even its use of traditional African cultural concepts were often stretched to fit into the larger theory. While a major focus of the ideology was ending colonial relationships on the African continent, many of the ideas were utopian, diverting the scientific nature of the Marxist political analysis which it claims to support.

== Beliefs ==
Like other African political ideologies at the time, the central focus of Nkrumaism was on decolonization across Africa. The central contention of Nkrumaism was that African countries, united with one another, needed to adopt socialist political structures which were consistent with the traditional African values of egalitarianism. Nkrumah rejected the idealized view of pre-colonial African societies that were classless or non-hierarchical, but accepted that Africa had a spirit of communalism and humanism. While colonial structures had damaged these communal, egalitarian values, they had not fully supplanted them. Nkrumaism then argued that a return to these values through socialist political structures would both heal the disruption caused by colonial structures and allow further development of African societies. The pan-African aspects of Nkrumah's ideology were justified by a claim that all African societies had a community of economic life and that in contradiction to the neocolonial structures that replaced formal colonies, only African unity would create real autonomy.

In Nkrumah's argument, four basic pillars formed the applied aspects of this theory: state ownership of the means of production, a one-party democracy, fostering a classless economic system, and pan-African unity. While embracing much of Marxist–Leninist philosophy and Soviet political structures at the time, the ideology differed in some key respects. First, while Marxism–Leninism saw revolution as the only way to replace class structures with a socialist egalitarian system, Nkrumah saw reform as the more appropriate case for Africa. He argued that Ghana, and most of the rest of Africa, had never developed the class distinctions which Karl Marx and Vladimir Lenin saw in Europe and thus reform could reestablish preexisting egalitarianism suited to a post-colonial context. Nkrumah wrote that:

From the ancestral lines of communalism, the passage to socialism lies in reform, because the underlying principles are the same. But when this passage carries one through colonialism the reform is revolutionary since the passage from colonialism to genuine independence is an act of revolution. But because of the continuity of communalism with socialism, in communalistic society, socialism is not a revolutionary creed, but a restatement in contemporary idiom of the principles underlying communalism.

He would change this idea after the 1966 coup, seeing revolution as increasingly necessary. Second, while Nkrumah believed in the materialism and economic determinism of Marxism, he argued that focusing on the economic system was only appropriate after achieving independence throughout Africa and that the political struggle was the first order in colonial and neocolonial contexts.

== Impact ==
The ideology of Nkrumaism formed a key part of the personality cult around Nkrumah and the party-building efforts of his political party, the CPP. This was in part achieved through Nkrumah's use of democratic centralism in the CPP and government. His arguments were widely published and these had an impact within the Gold Coast colony, independent Ghana, and other parts of Africa in the 1950s and 1960s. The CPP, founded by Nkrumah in 1949, became a vocal proponent for the teaching and application of Nkrumaism. When he became president in the 1960s, his Minister for Presidential Affairs, Tawia Adamafio, established study groups on Nkrumaism which many civil servants joined to advance their careers. At the same time, the CPP established Ghana Young Pioneers groups for school age children where Nkrumaism was taught. While the tenets were promoted through these various party efforts, applying all aspects of the ideology proved to be difficult for Nkrumah while President of the country. Because of this, some consider Nkrumaism to be "first of all a cultural phenomenon" in Ghana with little impact on the actual politics of the country.

== Criticisms ==
Henry Bretton argues that Nkrumaism was not a coherent ideology, but a vague framework supporting the cult of personality and the centralized rule of Nkrumah. He writes:

Nkrumaism was a verbalization of the requirements of the personal political machine. Professional scribes and amateurs, along with the Ghanaian Left, were set to the task of providing the coherence and internal consistency required to give a semblance of philosophy to the chaotic assemblage of ideas and fantasies borrowed from all parts of the world and from all periods of history, frequently out of context.

In contrast, Yuri Smertin criticized early works by Nkrumah from a Marxist perspective for distorting scientific socialism by combining religious and traditional elements.

== See also ==
- African Review
- African socialism
- Black Power
- Garveyism
- Lumumbism
- Mobutism
- Sankarism

== Bibliography ==
- Agyeman, Opoku (1988). "Of Friends and Foes of Nkrumaism". The Journal of Modern African Studies. 26 (2): 373–376. doi:10.1017/s0022278x00010648. S2CID 251058460.
- Austin, Dennis (1964). Politics in Ghana: 1946-1960. London: Oxford University Press.
- Biney, Ama (2011). The Political and Social Thought of Kwame Nkrumah. New York: Palgrave Macmillan.
- Bretton, Henry L. (1964). The Rise and Fall of Kwame Nkrumah: A Study of Personal Rule in Africa. New York: Frederick A. Praeger.
- Convention People's Party (2016). "Nkrumaism". CPP.
- Gyan, Afari (1976). The Political Ideas of Kwame Nkrumah. New York: African Heritage Studies Publishers.
- Omari, T. Peter (1972). Kwame Nkrumah: The Anatomy of an African Dictatorship. New York: Africana Publishing Corporation.
- Rahman, Ahmad A. (2007). The Regime Change of Kwame Nkrumah: Epic Heroism in Africa and the Diaspora. New York: Palgrave Macmillan.
- Simms, Rupe (2003). "'I am a Non-Denominational Christian and a Marxist Socialist:' A Gramscian Analysis of the Convention People's Party and Kwame Nkrumah's Use of Religion". Sociology of Religion. 64 (4): 463–477. doi:10.2307/3712336. JSTOR 3712336.
- Smith, Curtis C. (1991). "Nkrumaism as Utopianism". Utopian Studies. 1 (3): 31–36.
- Wilczynski, Jozef, ed. (1981). An Encyclopedic Dictionary of Marxism, Socialism and Communism. The Macmillan Press. doi:10.1007/978-1-349-05806-8. ISBN 978-1-349-05806-8.
