= List of political parties in Ghana =

This article lists political parties in Ghana.

Ghana has a multi-party system, with two dominant political parties: the centre-left National Democratic Congress and the centre-right New Patriotic Party. Other political parties include the Convention People's Party (CPP), the People's National Convention (PNC), the Progressive People's Party (PPP), the Great Consolidated Popular Party (GCPP), the All People's Congress (APC), etc.

== Regulation ==
Political parties in Ghana are regulated under the Political Parties Act 574 passed in 2000. This spells out how political parties may be founded, registered and operated. It also specifies how political parties may be funded in Ghana.

== The parties in Ghana ==
=== Fourth Republic (1992-present) ===
As at January 2025, there are 15 political parties according to the Electoral Commission of Ghana. Of these, a total of 11 parties indicated their willingness to participate in the political programmes by the state broadcaster, Ghana Broadcasting Corporation leading up to the 2020 Ghanaian general election. In 2018, there were 24 political parties listed on the website. There were 30 registered political parties on the list of the Electoral Commission of Ghana during the Fourth Republic in 2012.

==== Parliamentary parties ====
Name	Abbr.	Founded	Leader	Political position	Ideology	MPs
National Democratic Congress	NDC	1992	John Mahama	Centre-left	Social democracy	185 / 276
New Patriotic Party	NPP	1992	Mahamudu Bawumia	Centre-right	Liberal conservatism Conservatism	87 / 276

==== Other active parties ====
The following parties were on the list of parties of the Electoral Commission of Ghana but not represented in parliament.

Name	Abbr.	Founded	Leader	Political position	Ideology	MPs	Last election	Comments
All People's Congress	APC	2016	Hassan Ayariga			0	2024	Split from PNC
Convention People's Party	CPP	1949; 1996	Nana Frimpomaa Sarpong Kumankumah	Left-wing to Far-left	Nkrumaism; Pan-Africanism; African socialism African nationalism Left-wing nationalism Scientific socialism Anti-colonialism; Anti-imperialism	0	2024	Banned 1966, reformed 1996
Great Consolidated Popular Party	GCPP	1995	Daniel Augustus Lartey			0	2024	
Ghana Freedom Party	GFP	2012	Akua Donkor			0	2024	
Ghana Union Movement	GUM	2019	Christian Kwabena Andrews	Center-left	Social democracy	0	2024	
Liberal Party of Ghana	LPG	2017	Kofi Akpaloo			0	2024	
National Democratic Party	NDP	2012	Mohammed Frimpong	Center-left		0	2024	Split from NDC
People's National Convention	PNC	1992	Bernard Mornah		Nkrumaism; Socialism; Pan-Africanism	0	2024	
Progressive Alliance for Ghana	PAG	2024	John Enyonam Kwakwu Kpikpi		Nkrumaism	0	2024	Nkrumah tradition
Progressive People's Party	PPP	2012	Kofi Asamoah Siaw		Progressivism; Liberalism; Social liberalism	0	2024	
Note: The Electoral Commission indicates there are 15 parties registered at the time of the 2024 general election but does not provide a list

==== Inactive parties ====
The following parties were formally active in the fourth republic but are no more registered with the Electoral Commission of Ghana.

Name	Abbr.	Founded	Leader	Political position	Ideology	Last election	Comments
Democratic Freedom Party	DFP	2006	Obed Asamoah			2008	Merged with NDC in 2012 Certificate of registration cancelled by ECG in 2022.
Democratic People's Party	DPP	1992	Thomas Nuako; Ward-Brew			2016	Certificate of registration cancelled by ECG in 2022.
Every Ghanaian Living Everywhere	EGLE	1992	Nana Yaw Boakye; Ofori Atta			2004	Backed NDC in 2020 election. Certificate of registration cancelled by ECG in 2022.
Ghana Democratic Republican Party	GDRP	1992	Kofi Amoah				Not involved in 2020 election Certificate of registration cancelled by ECG in 2022.
Ghana National Party	GNP	2007	Kobina; Amo-Aidoo			2008	Certificate of registration cancelled by ECG in 2022.
Ghana Redevelopment Party	GRP						
Independent People's Party	IPP	2011	Kofi Akpaloo			2012	Dissolved in 2017
National Convention Party	NCP	1992	Kow Nkensen Arkaah		Nkrumaism	1996	Merged with PCP to reform CPP in 1996
National Independence Party	NIP	1992	Kwabena Darko		Nkrumaism	1992 Presidential only	Boycotted 1992 parliamentary election. Merged with PHP in 1993, forming PCP
National Reform Party	NRP	1999	Peter Kpordugbe			2004	Split from NDC; Not involved in 2020 election Certificate of registration cancelled by ECG in 2022.
New Vision Party	NVP	2008	Daniel Yaw Nkansah			2012	Certificate of registration cancelled by ECG in 2022.
People's Action Party	PAP	2018	Kwesi Busumbru			2020	Not involved in 2024 election Certificate of registration cancelled by ECG in 2022.
People's Destiny Party	PDP						Not involved in 2020 election
People's Convention Party	PCP	1993	Festus Busia		Nkrumaism	1996	Merged with NCP to reform CPP in 1996
People's Heritage Party	PHP	1992	Emmanuel Erskine		Nkrumaism	1992 Presidential only	Boycotted 1992 parliamentary election. Merged with NIP in 1993, forming PCP
Power Unity Party	PUP	2019	Eliahu Boateng				Did not contest 2020 election Certificate of registration cancelled by ECG in 2022.
Reformed Patriotic Democrats	RPD	2007				2008	Certificate of registration cancelled by ECG in 2022.
United Democratic Party	UDP		Yaw Kumey				Not involved in 2020 election
United Development System Party	UDSP	2012	Tetteh Kabraham Early				Did not contest 2012 election Certificate of registration cancelled by ECG in 2022.
United Front Party	UFP	2011				2016	Certificate of registration cancelled by ECG in 2022.
United Ghana Movement	UGM	1996	Charles Wereko-Brobby			2000	Certificate of registration cancelled by ECG in 2022.
United Love Party	ULP	2008	Ramon Osei Akoto			Could not contest 2008 or 2012 elections	Split from NDC,BT; Certificate of registration cancelled by ECG in 2022.
United Progressive Party	UPP	2016	Akwasi Addai Odike			2020	Certificate of registration cancelled by ECG in 2022.
United Renaissance Party	URP	2007	Eric Charles Kofi Wayo			2012	Certificate of registration cancelled by ECG in 2022.
Yes People's Party	YPP	2012	Annin – Kofi Addo			2012	Certificate of registration cancelled by ECG in 2022.

=== Third Republic (1979-1981) ===
During the Third Republic, the following list of parties contested the 1979 general election. The All People's Party was a merger of the opposition parties in parliament formed later. All parties in the Third Republic were banned following the military coup d'etat on 31 December 1981. There would be continuous military rule until after the 1992 general election.

Name	Abbr.	Founded	Leader	Political position	Ideology	MPs	Last election	Comments
Action Congress Party	ACP	1979	Frank Bernasko			10	1979	
All People's Party	APP	1981	Victor Owusu			58*	—	Merger of the parties in opposition- PFP, UNC, SDF and TFP
People's National Party	PNP	1979	Hilla Limann		Nkrumah tradition	71	1979	Offshoot of CPP / NAL
Popular Front Party	PFP	1979	Victor Owusu		Danquah/Busia tradition	42	1979	offshoot of Progress Party
Social Democratic Front	SDF	1979	Ibrahim Mahama			3	1979	
Third Force Party	TFP	1979	John Bilson			0	1979	
United National Convention	UNC	1979	William Ofori Atta			13	1979	

=== Second Republic (1969-1972) ===
The Second Republic spanned the period from October 1969 to 13 January 1972. This was the period when the Progress Party came to power with Kofi Busia as Prime Minister and Akufo-Addo as ceremonial President. It ended with the military coup d'état which brought the National Redemption Council military government into power. All political parties were banned.

Name	Abbr.	Founded	Leader	Political position	Ideology	MPs	Last election	Comments
All People's Republican Party	APRP	1969	P. K. K. Quaidoo			1	1969	
Justice Party	JP	1970	E. R. T. Madjitey				—	merger of NAL, PAP and UNP
National Alliance of Liberals	NAL	1969	K. A. Gbedemah			29	1969	offshoot of CPP as CPP was banned
People's Action Party	PAP	1969	Imoru Ayarna			2	1969	merged with NAL and UNP to form Justice Party
Progress Party	PP	1969	K. A. Busia			105	1969	offshoot of United Party
United Nationalist Party	UP	1969	H. S. Bannerman			2	1969	merged with NAL and PAP to form Justice Party

=== Independent State within the Commonwealth (1957-1960)/First Republic (1960-1966) ===
Name	Abbr.	Founded	Leader	Political position	Ideology	MPs	Last election	Comments
Convention People's Party	CPP	1949	Kwame Nkrumah			198	1965	Nkrumah tradition
Federation of Youth Organization	FYO		Modesto Apaloo			1	1956	Merged into United Party in 1957
Ga Shifimo Kpee	GSK	1957				0	—	Merged into United Party in 1957
Muslim Association Party	MAP	1954	Cobina Kessie			1	1956	Merged into United Party in 1957
National Liberation Movement	NLM	1954	Baffour Osei Akoto			12	1956	Merged into United Party in 1957
Northern People's Party	NPP	1954	S.D. Dombo			15	1956	Merged into United Party in 1957
Togoland Congress	TC	1951	S. G. Antor			2	1956	Merged into United Party in 1957
United Party	UP	1957	K. A. Busia				—	Merger of all opposition parties in parliament

=== Pre-Independence ===
Ghanaian natives were allowed to stand for elections into the Legislative Assembly. There were elections held in 1951, 1954 and 1956 prior to the United Kingdom granting Ghana independence.

Name	Abbr.	Founded	Leader	Political position	Ideology	MPs	Last election	Comments
Anlo Youth Organisation	AYO	1952	Modesto Apaloo			1	1954	
Convention People's Party	CPP	1949	Kwame Nkrumah			71	1956	Nkrumah tradition, split from UGCC
Federation of Youth Organization	FYO		Modesto Apaloo			1	1956	Merged into United Party in 1957
Ghana Congress Party	GCP	1952	K. A. Busia			1	1954	Merged into NLM
Muslim Association Party	MAP	1954	Cobina Kessie			1	1956	Merged into United Party in 1957
National Democratic Party	NDP	1950	Nii Amaa Ollennu		right wing	0	1951	merged with UGCC in 1952 to form the GCP
National Liberation Movement	NLM	1954	Baffour Osei Akoto			12	1956	Merged into United Party in 1957
Northern People's Party	NPP	1954	S. D. Dombo			15	1956	Merged into United Party in 1957
Togoland Congress	TC	1951	S. G. Antor			2	1956	Merged into United Party in 1957
United Gold Coast Convention	UGCC	1947	Paa Grant			3	1951	merged with NDP in 1952 to form GCP

== See also ==
- Electoral Commission of Ghana
- Lists of political parties
- List of political parties by region
