= List of general elections in Ghana =

This is a list of elections held in the British colony of the Gold Coast, which later expanded to include the Northern Territories, Ashanti Region and the Trans-Volta Togoland prior to becoming the Republic of Ghana.

== Gold Coast era ==
During the colonial era, the right to vote was very restricted. Only a privileged few had the right to vote and only a few seats were up for election in the legislative assembly. Those who voted were from urban areas, owned property and the council of chiefs. The first legislative council election took place in 1925. Between 1927 and 1944, there were a total of 30 seats in the Legislative Assembly. Of these, only nine were elected by natives. Six were elected by the three Provincial Councils in existence at the time and three were directly elected by very limited adult suffrage in Accra, Cape Coast and Sekondi. The 1951 election was the first in Africa to be held under universal suffrage.

In the 1927 Gold Coast general election, four of the nine Africans elected on the Legislative Council were J. E. Casely Hayford (Sekondi), John Glover Addo (Accra), Kobina Arku Korsah (Cape Coast) and Nana Ofori Atta for the Western Province. In the 1931 general election, three of the elected nine Africans were Frederick Nanka-Bruce (Accra), Kobina Arku Korsah for Cape Coast and George James Christian (Sekondi). Korsah and Christian retained their seats in the 1935 general election. Due to some controversies, the Accra election was rerun in 1936 and was won by Kojo Thompson. The three municipal elected members of the Legislative Council in 1944 were Tufuhin Moore (Cape Coast), Akilagpa Sawyerr (Accra) and Charles William Tachie-Menson (Sekondi).

== Universal suffrage from 1951 ==
The first election to be held under universal suffrage was the 1951 Gold Coast general election held on 8 February 1951. There was an 84-seat Legislative Assembly with 38 elected members being directly elected and the rest being appointed. Kwame Nkrumah who was then in prison on a three years sentence for sedition was released from jail by Charles Noble Arden-Clarke, the Governor of the Gold Coast and invited in order to become the Leader of Government Business. His party, the Convention People's Party (CPP), won 34 of the 38 elected seats in the election. Following a change in the constitution, the Assembly was expanded to 104 seats, all to be directly elected. In 1956, the Legislative Assembly was dissolved and elections were held to test the popular support for the call by the CPP for independence. This was won by the CPP paving the way for preparation for independence. This parliament went on to become the first parliament of the independent nation Ghana.

== From independence to 1969 ==
Ahead of Ghana becoming a republic, the first presidential election was held on 27 April 1960. Nkrumah won 89 per cent of the vote and was subsequently declared President for life. In the 1965 Ghanaian parliamentary election, all the CPP candidates were elected unopposed due to the one-party state system in place at the time. The National Liberation Council military government organised the 1969 Ghanaian parliamentary election which brought the Progress Party into power with a large majority. Following the military coup d'état of 1966, the National Liberation Council organised a general election on 26 August 1969. The voting was delayed in two constituencies, Chiana-Paga and Tumu and were held on 2 September 1969 and 3 September 1969. Five parties contested the election. Kofi Busia became prime minister as leader of the Progress Party, which won 104 of the 140 seats in parliament.

== Third Republic ==
Following seven years of military rule, the 1979 election was held to return Ghana to civilian rule on 18 June 1979. The president was directly elected, unlike in 1969 when the leader of the largest party in parliament became prime minister. There had to be a second round of the presidential ballot, as none of the contestants had more than 50 per cent of the vote in the first election. Akwasi Afrifa, a former military head of state and a candidate for the Mampong seat, was executed by firing squad on 26 June 1979, eight days after the election. He won his seat but did not live to take his seat in parliament.

== Fourth Republic ==
=== 1992 elections ===
Due to another military intervention, the next presidential election was 13 years later, on 3 November 1992. Jerry Rawlings, who had come to power in another military coup on 31 December 1981, won the election as the candidate of the Progressive Alliance, which was formed between his party, the National Democratic Congress (NDC), the Every Ghanaian Living Everywhere (EGLE) and National Convention Party (NCP). The turnout was 50.2 per cent. The opposition declared that this election had been rigged and boycotted the parliamentary election on 29 December 1992 which reduced the turnout to 28.1 per cent. The number of seats had been increased from 140 in 1979 to 200 and was won by the NDC which took 189 seats.

=== 1996 election ===
In the 1996 Ghanaian general election, Rawlings won a second term with 57.4 per cent of the votes. His party's majority reduced to 66 as the opposition took part this time.

=== 2000 election ===
History was made after the 2000 Ghanaian general election as the country experienced the first change of government through the ballot box. John Kufuor won the first ballot with 48.17 per cent of the vote. In the run-off elections between the first two candidates, Kufuor beat John Atta Mills with 56.9 per cent of the votes. In the parliamentary ballot, the NPP won 99 seats.

=== 2004 election ===
In the 2004 Ghanaian general election, Kufuor won a second term as president with 52.45 per cent of the votes. In the parliamentary contest, the NPP won 128 seats.

=== 2008 election ===
There was a second successful change of government by the ballot box after the 2008 Ghanaian general election. John Atta Mills won after a second round of voting, winning 50.23 per cent of the votes. His party, the NDC, won 116 of the 230 seats. Unfortunately, Mills died on 24 July 2012, less than five months before the 2012 Ghanaian general election. John Mahama, the Vice-President of Ghana was sworn in as president on the same day.

=== 2012 election ===
The number of seats had been increased to 275 from 230 amidst some controversy. A new biometric voters register was adopted to help reduce concerns about the validity of the electoral register. Some expressed concerns that the new system on its own will not address the issues raised. The elections extended from 7 December 2012 into the next day due to problems with the reliability of the Biometric voters machines being used to verify the identities of the voters. It was believed that registering and verifying the identity of 13 million voters within a 48 hours period was nevertheless exceeded the previous world record in India of 3.5 million people. Mahama went on to win 50.7 per cent of the votes to continue as president. Nana Akufo-Addo and the NPP went to the Supreme Court of Ghana to challenge the validity of the result of the election. This case raised a lot of public interest and tension. The nine-member panel of the court presided over by Justice William Atuguba ruled that the results of the 2012 presidential election should stand and that Mahama was elected legitimately. Akufo-Addo accepted the result and the feared chaos and violence after the result did not occur. The NDC won 148 seats giving them a majority of 21 in the 275 seat parliament.

=== 2016 election ===
In October 2016, the Electoral Commission disqualified 12 presidential aspirants from contesting the 2016 Ghanaian general election citing irregularities with their registration documentation. Papa Kwesi Nduom of the Progressive People's Party successfully overturned his disqualification in an Accra High Court. Mahama, however, lost the 2016 Ghanaian general election, winning 44.53 per cent of the votes cast against 53.72 per cent for Akufo-Addo. This led to the fourth change of government in the Fourth Republic. Eleven political parties contested the election. The two largest parties, the NPP and the NDC, won all the parliamentary seats between them. The NPP won 169 seats, while the NDC had the remaining 106.

=== 2020 election ===
The 2020 Ghanaian general election is due to be held on 7 December 2020. In June 2018, the Electoral Commissioner, Charlotte Osei and her two deputies were sacked by President Nana Akufo-Addo. She was replaced by Jean Adukwei Mensa. The revamped Electoral Commission then announced that it will compile a new voters register and replace the biometric voting system with an entirely new one as the old one was not fit for purpose.

== Election results ==
The seat majority figure given is for the difference between the number of MPs elected at the general election from the party of government, as opposed to all the other parties (some of which may have been giving some support to the government, but were not necessarily participating in a coalition).

=== Gold Coast - Limited elections to Legislative Council ===
Election	Date	Winning party	Seat majority	Seats	Turnout
1927	August 1927	—	—	30 (Note: Out of the 30 members, only six were directly elected by the Provincial Councils (three by the Eastern Province Council, two by the Central Province Council and one by the Western Province Council). Three others were directly elected for Accra, Cape Coast and Sekondi.)	—
1931	1931			30	—
1935	1935	—	—	30	—
1944	1944	—	—	30	—
1946	June 1946	—	—	32	—

=== Gold Coast-Universal suffrage ===
Election	Date	Elected Leader of government business or prime minister	Votes	Turnout	Winning party	Seat majority	Seats	Turnout
1951 (MLA)	8 February 1951 (Note: First election under universal suffrage in the Gold Coast.)	Kwame Nkrumah (Note: Kwame Nkrumah was released from prison to form the government as he became the Leader of Government Business.)	—	—	Convention People's Party	30	38 (Note: The Convention People's Party won 34 out of the 38 seats available.)	—
1954 (MLA)	15 June 1954	Kwame Nkrumah	—	—	Convention People's Party	38	104 (Note: The number of seats were increased to 104 and they were all elected unlike previously.)	—

=== Independence ===
Election	Date	Elected prime minister or president	Votes	Turnout	Winning party	Seat majority	Seats	Turnout
1956 (MLA)	17 July 1956 (Note: Elections held to test popular support of request for independence for Ghana by the CPP.)	Kwame Nkrumah	—	—	Convention People's Party	38	104	—
1960	27 April 1960	Kwame Nkrumah (Note: Ballot Question: Do you accept Kwame Nkrumah or Joseph Boakye Danquah as the first President under the new Constitution? Nkrumah won and was declared president for life after that.)	89.07%	—	Convention People's Party	—	—	—
First Republic
1965 (MPs)	9 June 1965	Kwame Nkrumah	—	—	Convention People's Party	198 (Note: All the CPP candidates were elected unopposed due to a one-party state having been declared.)	198	—
Second Republic
1969 (MPs)	29 August 1969 (Note: The elections for the Chiana-Paga and Tumu constituencies were held on 2 September 1969 and 3 September 1969 respectively.)	Kofi Busia (Note: Busia became prime minister on the basis of being the leader of the party with the largest number of seats.)	—	—	Progress Party	70	140	—

=== 1979 onwards ===
Elections	Date	Elected president (during term)	Votes	Turnout	Winning party	Seat majority	Seats	Turnout
Third Republic
1979 (MPs)	18 June 1979 & 31 December 1981 (Note: The presidential election went to a second round as the winner had to have more than 50% of the total votes cast.)	Hilla Limann (Note: Hilla Limann was the first president to be elected in a multiparty system for Ghana since Kwame Nkrumah.)	62.0%		People's National Party	2	140	
Fourth Republic
1992	3 November 1992	Jerry Rawlings (Note: Jerry Rawlings became the first president of the fourth republic. He was the military head of state before the election.)	58.4%	50.2%	—	—	—	—
1992 (MPs)	29 December 1992 (Note: The parliamentary election was boycotted by the NPP, PNC, NIP, PHP.)	—	—	—	National Democratic Congress	178	200	—
1996 (MPs)	7 December 1996	Jerry Rawlings	57.4%	78.3%	National Democratic Congress	66	200	—
2000 (MPs)	7 & 28 December 2000 (Note: The 2000 presidential ballot went to a second round.)	John Kufuor (Note: John Kufuor became the first opposition candidate to become president through the ballot box.)	56.90%	60.4%	New Patriotic Party	137	273	62.0%
2004 (MPs)	7 December 2004	John Kufuor	52.45%	85.1%	New Patriotic Party	26	230	84.11%
2008 (MPs)	7 & 28 December 2008 (Note: The presidential ballot went for a second round as no one had more than 50% of the vote.)	John Atta Mills (Note: John Atta Mills of the opposition won the presidential vote after the second ballot.)	50.23%	72.91%	National Democratic Congress	2	230	70.2%
2008 (MPs)	7 & 28 December 2008	(John Mahama) (Note: Mahama became president following the death in office of John Atta Mills.)	50.23%	72.91%	National Democratic Congress	2	230	70.2%
2012 (MPs)	7 & 8 December 2012 (Note: Voting continued into the next day due to problems with the Biometric Voting Machines being used to check the identity of voters.)	John Mahama	50.70%	79.43%	National Democratic Congress	21	275	80.01%
2016 (MPs)	7 December 2016	Nana Akufo-Addo	53.72%	69.25%	New Patriotic Party	63	275	52.48%
2020 (MPs)	7 December 2020 (Note: Results for 1 constituency outstanding in the presidential vote.)	Nana Akufo-Addo	51.30%	78.89%	New Patriotic Party	-1	275	77.47%
2024 (MPs)	7 December 2024	John Mahama	56.42%	63.55%	National Democratic Congress	96	276	

== See also ==
- Elections in Ghana

== External sources ==
- African Elections Database
