= John Tsiboe =

John Wallace Tsiboe, also sometimes referred to as John S. Tsiboe (1904–1963) was a Ghanaian merchant and newspaper proprietor, the founder editor and owner of the independent Ashanti Pioneer.

== Life ==
Born in Assin Attandaso, Tsiboe was educated at Wesley College of Education, Kumasi. He opened a store in Kumasi and became a successful merchant there. In 1939 he married Nancy Tsiboe, who would go on to have a political career in her own right. The couple established a press known as the Abura Printing Works, and started publishing a newspaper, the Ashanti Pioneer.

An early member of the United Gold Coast Convention (UGCC), Tsiboe and his wife were for a while both close to Kwame Nkrumah. Tsiboe apparently bought Nkrumah a silk suit and leather briefcase so that Nkrumah could "look sharp" as UGCC general secretary. Tsiboe also briefly joined the Convention People's Party in 1949, but soon became an opponent of Nkrumah. After an unsuccessful attempt to organize the Gold Coast Labor Party in 1950, he joined the Ghana Congress Party and then the National Liberation Movement (NLM) in 1954. He stood as NLM candidate for the Abura Asebu constituency in the 1956 Gold Coast general election, but lost to the CPP candidate Joseph Essilfie Hagan.

In 1957 Tsiboe was active in establishing the United Party, Ghana's main opposition party to Nkrumah. The Ashanti Pioneer became the main vehicle for criticism of Nkrumah, and in 1962 Nkrumah banned the paper.

Tsiboe died at the Westminster Hospital in London in 1963. The writer Joseph Godson Amamoo has suggested that the "frequent harassment and intimidation from the hands of some of the security personnel" may have resulted in "psychosomatic illnesses" which helped cause Tsiboe's early death. His children included John K. Tisoboe, who took over Tsiboe's printing business, and the fashion designer Nancy Tsiboe, later dubbed 'Miss Africa'.
