= Anlo Youth Organisation =

- Leader: Modesto Apaloo
- Founded: 1952
- Dissolved: 1957
- Merged into: United Party
- 1954 elections: 1

Election symbol
- Crossed keys in white on a green background

The Anlo Youth Organisation (also known as the Anlo Youth Association) was a political party that existed in the Gold Coast and later Ghana. It campaigned for the Ewe people under British rule to stay within Ghana after independence. It ended by merging with other parties to form a united opposition to the Convention People's Party.

The symbol of the party was crossed keys in white on a green background.

== Before independence ==
The Anlo Youth Organisation was formed by Modesto Apaloo. The party mainly functioned in the south-eastern Gold Coast, where the Anlos are located. The Anlos are a subgroup of the Ewes found in Ghana and Togo. Togoland, where the Ewes lived was a German protectorate before World War I. In 1952, the British merged the south-eastern part of the Gold Coast which was part of the Eastern Province with the southern part of Trans-Volta Togoland, the British Togoland. This left the Ewe divided with one half under British rule and the other half under French rule. The party campaigned to have the British Togoland join Gold Coast at independence to form Ghana while the Togoland Congress preferred the UN Trust Territory to be rejoined with French Togoland.

In the election held on 15 June 1954, the party won one of the 104 seats in the Legislative Assembly. Modesto Apaloo was the sole elected MP from this party.

== After independence ==
After Ghana obtained independence on 6 March 1957, the Avoidance of Discrimination Act, 1957 (C.A. 38), was passed. Its purpose was to prohibit the existence of political parties that were based on predominantly " ethnic, religious, or other sectional interests, with effect from 31 December 1957".

An Act to prohibit organizations using or engaging in tribal, regional, racial and religious propaganda to the detriment of any community, or securing the election of persons on account of their tribal, regional or religious affiliations and for other purpose connected therewith.

This meant that the name Anlo which refers to a section of the Ewe people made it illegal for the party to continue to exist under that law. All the opposition parties, including the National Liberation Movement, Moslem Association Party, Northern People's Party, Ga Shifimo Kpee, Togoland Congress and the Anlo Youth Organisation merged to form the United Party, under the leadership of Kofi Abrefa Busia.

== Performance in Legislative Assembly election ==
| Election | Votes | % | Seats | +/– | Position | Government |
|---|---|---|---|---|---|---|
| 1954 | 11,259 | 1.59% | 1 / 104 | New | 6th | Opposition |
Source: Sternberger, et al.

Modesto Apaloo won the Anlo South seat in the Legislative Assembly of the Gold Coast. He had 6,497 votes while F. K. Fiawoo of the Convention People's Party had 2,028 votes.

== See also ==
- List of political parties in Ghana
- United Party (Ghana)
