= Nancy Tsiboe =

Ghanaian publisher and activist

Nancy Tsiboe (born 1923) was a Ghanaian publisher, educator and activist.

== Life ==
Nancy Quargraine was born in Saltpond on 13 December 1923. Her father, R. Brown Quargraine, was organist at the Saltpond Methodist Church. Her great-great-grandmother, Akyemfo Mansa, had been a successful early-nineteenth-century businesswoman.

Tsiboe was educated at Saltpond Methodist School and Mboforaturo College, where she completed a degree in Teacher Training and Domestic Science. After graduation she returned home and in 1939 married the businessman John Tsiboe. In the same year the couple established the Aburo Printing Works and an independent newspaper, the Ashanti Pioneer. She worked as managing director of the press, as well as serving as a juvenile magistrate and becoming politically active.

In 1952, Tsiboe visited the United Kingdom, to attend the conference of the World YWCA and undertake a 12-month course in social services. While in England she visited a range of hotels and institutions for girls, and completed courses in cookery and baking at the London Polytechnic and a sewing course under Sarah Chignell, dressmaker to Princess Margaret. On returning to Ghana in 1953 she opened the Happy Home Institute, a vocational school for girls.

Tsiboe stood as Ghana Congress Party (GCP) candidate for Kumasi South Constituency in the 1954 Gold Coast general election. At one rally for the GCP and Muslim Association Party, she proclaimed "I am fearless. And like Yaa Asantewaa I will take up the gun and lead the men into battle." Though billed as "the housewife's choice", Tsiboe's uncompromising stance has also been viewed as demonstrating "the extent to which Western education had failed to domesticate women". She did not manage to win the South Kumasi seat, losing to the CPP candidate E. O. Asafu Adjaye.

Tsiboe joined the National Liberation Movement (NLM) in 1954, becoming general secretary of the NLM's women's section. As a NLM activist in 1956, Tsiboe criticized Nkrumah – unmarried and from an undistinguished family in a rural backwater – for his rootlessness. Gold Coasters could not "know where he really comes from", and the CPP's anti-chief politics encouraged "disrespect in our children":

You [women] will all agree with me that only a married man with a home knows how to manage a home. And you will agree with me that he alone can manage a country [..] If Mr. Nkrumah truly wants self-gov. he would go to the Asantahene to discuss it with him...

Tsiboe later became national treasurer of the United Party (UP). In 1959, as Nkrumah stepped up harassment of the UP, Tsiboe resigned her post as UP treasurer and joined the CPP. In 1962 Nrumah forced the Ashanti Pioneer to abandon publication, and in 1963 Tsiboe's husband died. The couple's children include John K. Tisoboe, who took over the family printing business, and the fashion designer Nancy Tsiboe, later dubbed 'Miss Africa'.
