= Ashie Nikoi =

Ghanaian politician

Gershon Ashie Nikoi was a Ghanaian politician, Pan-African activist, and a farmer. He was a founding member of the Convention People's Party (C.P.P.) and founder of the Ghana Farmers' Congress.

== Early life and politics ==
Nikoi was a native of La, Accra. After his secondary education he joined Huileries du Congo Belge in Belgian Congo, where he managed the plantation owned by the company. He later came back to the Gold coast in 1929, to start his own cocoa farms in the Akim area, and was a cofounder the Farmers' Committee of British West Africa. In 1945, He led the West African cocoa farmers delegation that attended the Pan-African Congress in Manchester, United Kingdom. Whilst in Britain, He was asked by Kobina Sekyi to represent the Gold Coast Aborigines' Right Protection Society at the congress and deliver a petition to the House of Commons on behalf of the society.

He became actively involved in the politics of the Gold Coast upon his return from the congress. He spoke against British imperialism and was seen in most political activities in the colony. When Kwame Nkrumah formed the Convention Peoples Party on 12 June 1949, He joined the party and was member of the first working committee of the convention. He chaired the first meeting of the committee and proposed the use of the red rooster—the symbol of Labadi, his native town—as the symbol of the newly formed political party.

In December 1949, he co-founded the Ghana Farmer's Congress with John Ayew. The association served as the farmers' wing of C.P.P. and was used to mobilize funds to support the activities of the party. He contested for Akim Abuakwa Central seat in 1951 Gold Coast general election but lost to J.B Danquah of the United Gold Coast Convention. Nikoi was appointed as a member of the Cocoa Marketing Board by Nkrumah but resigned due to a disagreement on establishing a cocoa purchasing monopoly. This disagreement led to him being expelled from the C.P.P.

When the Ga Shifimo Kpee was created to protect the interest of the Ga people, Nikoi, and Dzenzle Dzewu was chosen to lead the new movement. In 1952, Nikoi together with other opposition parties formed the Ghana Congress Party, led by Kofi Abrefa Busia. He contested in the 1954 Gold Coast general election for the newly created Akim Abuakwa East constituency, but lost to Kwaku Amoah-Awuah of the C.P.P.

== Detention and death ==
Nikoi spent time in detention due to his political activities. In 1950, he was detained with other leading members of the C.P.P. by the colonial authority over their involvement in the Positive Action campaign, led by Nkrumah. He was again arrested and imprisoned by Nkrumah under the Preventive Detention Act in 1960. After a year in detention he was released due to his ill health. He fled to Nigeria to escape being detained again.

He died in 1963 while in exile.
