= Cobina Kessie =

Ghanaian lawyer and politician

Ambassador to Liberia
- In office December 1959 – 1960
- Prime Minister: Kwame Nkrumah

MP for Kumasi North
- In office 1956 – December 1959
- Monarch: Elizabeth II
- Governor General: Gordon Guggisberg
- Prime Minister: Kwame Nkrumah
- Preceded by: Archie Casely-Hayford
- Succeeded by: Daniel Asafo-Agyei
- Parliamentary group: Muslim Association Party; United Party
- Constituency: Kumasi North

Personal details
- Born: 1906 Kumasi
- Party: Muslim Association Party; United Party
- Profession: Lawyer
- Nickname: Prince Kessie of Ashanti

Cobina Kessie was a Ghanaian barrister, diplomat and politician.

== Studies in the UK ==
Born in 1906 in Kumasi, Kessie arrived in 1937 in the United Kingdom, where he studied law. He also studied anthropology under Bronisław Malinowski at the London School of Economics. During his stay, he served as a BBC broadcaster. He was a member of the Gold Coast Students' Association and the Scottsboro Defence Committee. He returned to Ghana in 1945.

== Politics ==
Kessie was one of the members of the Coussey Committee set up in 1949 for constitutional reform in the Gold Coast. He was the Member of Parliament (MP) for Kumasi North in the first Parliament of Ghana following independence. He was elected in the 1956 Gold Coast general election held in July 1956. He was the only member of the Muslim Association Party (MAP) to win a seat. The elected members of the Legislative Assembly election went on to be MPs in the Ghana parliament. He was nominated for the position of Deputy Speaker of Parliament but lost the position to C. H. Chapman by 71 votes to 30. Kessie was a member of the Asanteman Council prior to being in parliament. The MAP merged with other parties to form the United Party in 1957 following introduction of legislation that proscribed sectarian parties.

Kessie was one of the fifteen members appointed onto the first General Legal Council of Ghana in September 1958.

== Diplomatic service ==
Kessie became the ambassador of Ghana to Liberia in December 1959. He later also served in China, United Arab Republic / Egypt and Belgrade in what was then Yugoslavia.
