= Rita Akoto Coker =

Ghanaian-American writer

Rita Akoto Coker (born 1953) is a Ghanaian-American writer, primarily of romance novels. She has published five books, including the 2001 novel Serwah, the Saga of an African Princess. Her father, Baffour Osei Akoto, was the founder of Ghana's National Liberation Movement.

== Biography ==
Rita Akoto was born in 1953 in Ghana. Her parents were Helena Osei Akoto and Baffour Osei Akoto, a member of the pre-independence National Liberation Movement and a chief linguist at the Manhyia Palace. Her brother, Owusu Afriyie Akoto, is a Ghanaian politician with the New Patriotic Party.

Coker migrated to the United States where she lives in Chicago and works as a marketing consultant. She began writing romance novels, publishing her first book, Serwah: The Saga of an African Princess, in 2001. She has since released four more books, including The Lost Princess and its sequel, Fate's Promise. Her books have been primarily released by Ghanaian publishers including Afram Publications and Kwadwoan Publishing Company.
