= YPP =

YPP is an initialism that may stand for:

- Yohoho! Puzzle Pirates
- Permai Education Foundation (Indonesian: Yayasan Pendidikan Permai)
- Youth Parliament Program, in India
- Yes People's Party, in Ghana
- Young People's Party (Sierra Leone)
- Young Progressives Party, Nigeria
- YouTube Partner Program
