= Owusu Afriyie Akoto =

Ghanaian agricultural economist and politician

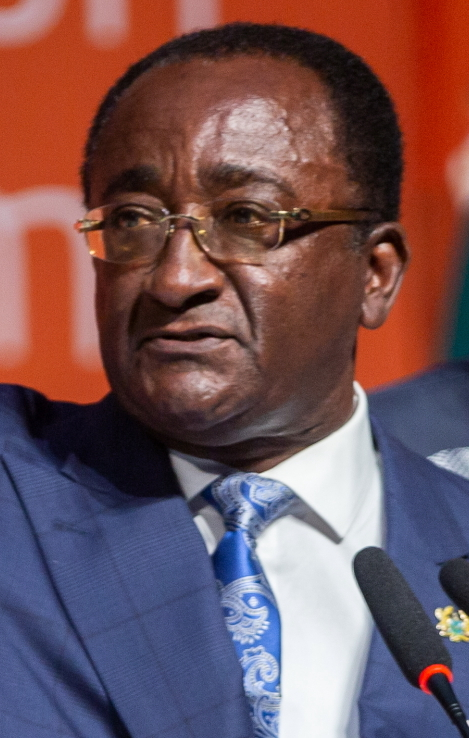
- Owusu Afriyie Akoto in 2019

Minister of Food and Agriculture
- In office February 2017 – 2023
- President: Nana Akuffo-Addo
- Preceded by: Fiifi Kwetey
- Succeeded by: Bryan Acheampong

MP for Kwadaso
- In office January 2009 – January 2017
- President: John Evans Atta Mills; John Dramani Mahama
- Preceded by: Josephine Hilda Addo
- Succeeded by: Samiu Kwadwo Nuamah

Personal details
- Born: 19 October 1949 (age 76) Koforidua, Ghana
- Party: New Patriotic Party
- Children: 8
- Relatives: Bafuor Osei Akoto, father
- Education: B.S. agriculture, University of Ghana; M.S. agricultural economics, Cambridge University; PhD, Cambridge University, 1985
- Profession: Agricultural economist

Owusu Afriyie Akoto (born 19 October 1949) is a Ghanaian agricultural economist and politician. He is a member of the New Patriotic Party and was a Member of Parliament for the Kwadaso Constituency from 2009 to 2017. He was a cabinet minister in the Nana Akufo-Addo administration and served as Minister of Food and Agriculture of Ghana. He resigned on 10 January 2023 to focus on his presidential ambition. He holds MSc and PHD Degree in Agricultural Economics from the University of Cambridge, England.

== Early life and education ==
Owusu Afriyie Akoto was born to Bafuor Osei Akoto, the founder and leader of the pre-independence National Liberation Movement and also a chief linguist at the Manhyia Palace. Akoto had his secondary school education at Opoku Ware School, Kumasi. He continued to the University of Ghana, Legon and graduated with a Bachelor of Science degree in agriculture. He then studied at Cambridge University, where he obtained a Master of Science in agricultural economics. He earned his Doctor of Philosophy degree at Cambridge in 1985.

== Working life ==
Afriyie Akoto was employed by the International Coffee Organization in London, England, for more than a decade. Among the positions he held include economist, senior economist, principal economist, and chief economic advisor. He also served as a consultant to the World Bank(a United Nations agency) on soft commodities—namely, cocoa, coffee, and sugar. After working for over 18 years abroad, he returned to Ghana where from 1995 to 2008 he served as the CEO of Goldcrest Commodities Limited and Plantation Resources Limited.

== Political life ==
Afriyie Akoto first contested the Kwadaso constituency seat in 2004 and received 20 of the total votes cast by delegates. He lost to fellow political newcomer Josephine Hilda Addo, who won with 26 votes. Addo went on to win the constituency election in the 2004 general election. Afriyie Akoto again contested the 2007 constituency primary and beat the incumbent. He served two terms as the Member of Parliament for Kwadaso from 2009 to 2016. While at Parliament, Afriyie Akoto was the Deputy Ranking Member for the Committee on Food and Agriculture and Cocoa Affairs. He was succeeded by Samiu Kwadwo Nuamah when he lost the NPP parliamentary primary in 2015.

=== 2015 parliamentary primary ===
In June 2015, Afriyie Akoto contested the constituency primary with the hope of securing enough votes to allow him to contest the constituency parliamentary election. Five other candidates including Addo, a former Member of Parliament for the constituency, contested the election. The eventual winner was Nuamah, who pulled 191 of the total votes cast. Afriyie Akoto obtained 95 of the total votes. In his concession speech, Afriyie Akoto promised to work together with Nuamah to maintain the parliamentary seat and asserted that Nuamah had won the seat on merit.

=== Agriculture Minister ===
In January 2017, President Nana Akufo-Addo nominated Afriyie Akoto for the position of Minister of Food and Agriculture. He was approved the same month. During his vetting, he made it known that investors from South Africa and the United States who had visited the Afram plains, Kintampo, and other places in the country were excited about the animal-rearing opportunities those places offer and had expressed interest in investing in the sector.

On Tuesday, 10 January 2023, Afriyie Akoto resigned as Minister of Food and Agriculture by presenting his resignation letter to the President of the Republic of Ghana; Nana Addo Dankwa Akufo-Addo at the Jubilee House, Accra. In a press statement issued by the Director of Communications at the Presidency, Republic of Ghana, President Nana Addo Dankwa Akufo-Addo accepted his resignation letter and thanked Afriyie Akoto for his services to the country. Hence, appointing Hon. Mavis Hawa Koomson, Minister for Fisheries and Aquaculture, and Member of Parliament for Awutu Senya East to be caretaker Minister at the Ministry of Food and Agriculture until a permanent Minister is appointed. Afriyie Akoto presented his handover notes to the caretaker Minister, Hon. Mavis Hawa Koomson whose appointment takes effect on Monday, 24 January 2023.

==== Vision for the Ministry ====
As the Minister of Food and Agriculture, Afriyie Akoto promised to increase the percentage of farmers who use improved seeds for farming, which as of June 2017 stood at eleven percent. He asserted that 85 percent of farmers still use traditional seeds, which reduces their yields. He has also made it known that the government will be collaborating with the Savanna Agricultural Research Institute and the Grains Development Board to overcome the deficit in the supply of seeds for the Planting for Food and Jobs programme.

He is credited for designing and implementing the Government of Ghana's flagship Planting for Food and Jobs programme, which was launched on 19 April 2017. This policy initiative was to address the decline being experienced in the agricultural sector of the country. However, there have been mixed reactions about the success of the policy initiative with some Civil Society Organizations (CSOs) in the Agricultural sector calling for a review whilst the government has been touting its success based on market figures and improvement in food security for 6.4 million Ghanaians.

Critics of the policy have reiterated its failure due to skyrocketing prices of food items due to soaring inflation, poor quality seeds and fertilizers procured for the programme and false submission of claims hence, the need for a review for its sustainability. On the other hand, Afriyie Akoto fired at critics for failing to see the intended impact of the Planting for Food and Jobs programme.

=== Cabinet Minister ===
In May 2017, President Akufo-Addo named Afriyie Akoto as one of 19 ministers who would form his cabinet. The names of the 19 ministers were submitted to the Parliament of Ghana and announced by the Speaker of the House, Rt. Hon. Prof. Mike Ocquaye. As a cabinet minister, Afriyie Akoto is part of the president's inner circle and is to aid in key decision-making activities in the country.

=== New Patriotic Party Flagbearership Race ===
Following his resignation from his role as Minister of Food and Agriculture, Afriyie Akoto has disclosed his ambition to run for President of the Republic of Ghana under the ticket of the New Patriotic Party (NPP) in the 2024 General Elections. Afriyie Akoto has outlined seven (7) campaign policies to spearhead the total transformation of the country when elected as President with agricultural transformation as the paradigm shift for his agenda.

On Monday, 19 June 2023, Afriyie Akoto officially filed for nomination at the NPP party headquarters at Asylum Down as a flagbearer hopeful for the party in the 2024 General Elections. After filing his nomination forms, he indicated that the NPP party cannot 'Break the 8' with a divided front and hence the need to constitutional allow delegates to make the decision. On the 26th of July 2023, Afriyie Akoto picked number five during the balloting process for the NPP flagbearer hopefuls. This balloting took place in anticipation of the special delegates conference, which is scheduled to be held on the 26th of August, 2023

== Personal life ==
Afriyie Akoto is married with seven children. He is a Catholic.

Political offices
Preceded by Fiifi Kwetey	Minister of Agriculture; February 2017 –	Incumbent
