= Samiu =

Samiu is a given name. Notable people with the given name include:

- Samiu Mohi (born c. 1962), Tongan rugby union player
- Samiu Kwadwo Nuamah (fl. 2015), Ghanaian academic
- Samiu Vahafolau (born 1978), Tongan rugby union player
- Samiu Vaipulu (born 1952), Tongan politician
