= Samiu Kwadwo Nuamah =

Ghanaian politician

MP for Kwadaso
- In office January 2017 – 2021
- President: Nana Akuffo-Addo
- Preceded by: Owusu Afriyie Akoto

Personal details
- Born: 25 July Tanoso, Kumasi
- Party: New Patriotic Party
- Committees: Mines and Energy committee, poverty reduction strategy committee

Samiu Kwadwo Nuamah is a Ghanaian academic, engineer, and politician. He is a member of the New Patriotic Party and the incumbent Member of Parliament for the Kwadaso Constituency.

== Early life ==
Born on 25 July, Nuamah is from Tanoso, a suburb of Kumasi in the Ashanti Region of Ghana. He holds an engineering doctorate (EngD) and a master's degree from The University of Nottingham UK and Cranfield University UK respectively in Chemical Engineering, and subsequently lectured at University of Ghana before entering parliament in 2017.

== 2015 parliamentary primary ==
In June 2015, Nuamah contested the constituency primary with the hope of securing enough votes to allow him contest the constituency parliamentary election. Five other people including the incumbent Owusu Afriyie Akoto and Josephine Hilda Addo, a former Member of Parliament for the constituency, contested the election. He won the election with 191 of the total votes cast.

== 2016 general election ==
Out of 68541 votes cast in Ghana's general election, Nuamah won over 90% of the votes, beating his rivals Monica Buamah of the National Democratic Congress, David Akwasi Adongo of the People's National Convention and Kwame Boateng Antwi of the Convention People's Party to represent the Kwadaso Constituency in the Parliament of Ghana.

== Personal life ==
Nuamah is married to Naana Akosua Serwaa Nuamah and has two children with her.
