= Modesto Apaloo =

Ghanaian politician

Member of the Ghana Parliament for Anlo South
- In office 1954–1959
- Succeeded by: Daniel Apedoh

Leader Anlo Youth Organisation
- In office 1952–1957
- Constituency: Anlo South

Personal details
- Born: 24 February 1920
- Died: 24 March 1991 (aged 78) Durham, England
- Resting place: Awudome Cemetery, Accra
- Relations: Fred Kwasi Apaloo

Modesto Kwasi Apaloo (24 February 1920 – 24 March 1991) was a Ghanaian politician. He was a Member of parliament and was the founder and leader of the defunct Anlo Youth Organisation.

== Politics ==
Apaloo formed the Anlo Youth Association (AYO) in 1951 when the Gold Coast was still under British rule. His party was mainly active in the southeastern region of the country. This area is mainly occupied by the Anlo who belong to the Ewe people of Ghana. He was the only one from the AYO to win a seat in the legislative assembly after the 1954 Gold Coast legislative election. He held this seat in the 1956 elections prior to the independence of Ghana. He was thus a member of Ghana's first parliament after independence in March 1957 for the Anlo South constituency. Partly due to legislation passed by the Nkrumah's government proscribing parties that are affiliated to identifiable ethnic groups, most of the opposition parties at the time merged to form the United Party (Ghana) under the leadership of Kofi Abrefa Busia, thus ending his role as AYO leader.

== Arrest ==
The General Officer commanding the Ghana Army at the time, Major general A. G. V. Paley ordered the court martial of an army officer George Whaitey, who failed to report a conspiracy by R. R. Amponsah and Apaloo on the life of the Prime Minister of Ghana, Kwame Nkrumah in January 1959. He was suspected of plotting with other opposition leaders against the Nkrumah government. Apaloo himself was detained under the Preventive Detention Act by the Nkrumah government along with other politicians.

== Death ==
Apaloo died at the age of 74 years at Durham, England in March 1991. He was buried at the Awudome Cemetery in Accra, Ghana.

== See also ==
- Anlo Youth Organisation
