= UGCC =

UGCC may refer to:

- Ukrainian Greek Catholic Church, the second largest Eastern Rite church within the Catholic Church
- United Gold Coast Convention, a post-Second World War political party
