= Phyllis Christian =

Ghanaian lawyer and consultant (born 1956)

- Born: Phyllis Maria Christian; 1956 (age 69–70); Ghana
- Education: Holy Child School; University of Ghana; Ghana School of Law
- Occupations: Lawyer, consultant
- Known for: CEO ShawbellConsulting
- Parent(s): Howard Christian; Sarah Christian née Grant
- Relatives: George Alfred Grant (grandfather); Clara Marguerite Christian (aunt); Essi Matilda Forster (aunt); Margaret Busby (cousin); Moira Stuart (cousin)

Phyllis M. Christian (born 1956) is a Ghanaian lawyer and consultant who has been called "one of the most influential women in Ghana". A lawyer by training (the fourth generation of her family to enter the legal profession), she is also the founder, chief executive officer and managing consultant of ShawbellConsulting, based in Accra. Her maternal grandfather George Alfred Grant, popularly known as Paa Grant, was one of the founding fathers of Ghana.

== Background ==
=== Education and early career ===
Phyllis Maria Christian was born in Ghana, the elder daughter of high court lawyer Howard J. Christian and his wife Sarah (née Grant, whose father Paa Grant was the founding president of the United Gold Coast Convention, which fought for Ghanaian independence), and the fourth of her parents' five children. Her father was the son of Dominica-born barrister George James Christian (1869–1940). She was educated at Holy Child School in Cape Coast (1967–74), and from 1974 to 1977 at the University of Ghana, Legon. She received a degree in English Literature and Philosophy, and went on to postgraduate studies in law at the University of Ghana (1979) and a postgraduate degree in International Law & Business from the City University of London (1981), obtaining professional qualification from the Ghana School of Law in 1981.

=== ShawbellConsulting ===
In June 2002, Christian founded ShawbellConsulting, an Accra-based company providing legal and management consultancy services. In her role as chief executive officer, Christian (whose specialist practice areas are Corporate and Energy) has led the company to win a number of awards, being adjudged best law consulting firm of the year at the Offshore Ghana Oil and Gas Awards in 2014–15, among other accolades.

=== Other activities ===
As an advocate of incentives for indigenous firms, Christian has written for such outlets as the Daily Graphic, and endorses plans for legislation "to require that at least 70 per cent of all government, taxpayer-financed contracts and procurements be executed by local corporate entities" and a policy requiring a specified percentage be sourced "from entities owned by women, persons with disability, and those established under the Youth Enterprise Fund".

In a voluntary capacity, Christian has been a board member of a number of organisations, including Sharecare Ghana (Sharecare4U) and the independent not-for-profit Institute for Democratic Governance (IDEG).

In 2015, she was appointed to the Advisory Committee of the Ghana Infrastructure Investment Fund (GIIF) of President John Dramani Mahama.

Her writings include the chapter "Administration of justice by traditional authorities in Ghana: an exposition on the law and practice" contributed to A Commitment to Law, Development and Public Policy (2016, edited by Richard Frimpong Oppong and Kissi Agyebeng), a festschrift in honour of Nana Dr S. K. B. Asante, lawyer and paramount chief of Asokore Asante in the Ashanti Region.

Christian appeared in the documentary film The Election Petition, which deals with the processes leading up to, during and after the election petition that was filed after Ghana's 2012 general elections.

She chairs the Ethics Committee of the Ghana Football Association (GFA), and in 2021 was appointed to the Ghana Advisory Board of Tullow Oil.
