= Federation of Youth Organization =

The Federation of Youth Organization is a defunct political party which existed in the Gold Coast. It contested the 1956 Gold Coast general election, winning one of the one hundred and four seats in the National Assembly. This was the first and only seat ever won by the party. This was the one and only national election it contested. This election determined the members of the first Parliament of Ghana in March 1957. Following the attainment of Independence from British colonial rule, the Nkrumah government of Ghana passed an Act to proscribe sectional, regional, religious, and tribal parties. This led to most of the opposition parties merging to form the United Party. This Act was known as the Avoidance of Discrimination Act, 1957 (C.A. 38), and it took effect from 31 December 1957. This led to the existence of the smaller opposition parties such as (FYO), Northern People's Party, Muslim Association Party, National Liberation Movement (NLM), Anlo Youth Organization, Togoland Congress and the Ga Shifimokpee coming to an end.

== Parliamentary elections ==
Election	Number of FYO votes	Share of votes	Seats	+/-	Position	Outcome
1956	10,745	1.54	1	▲	▲6th	Opposition

== See also ==
- List of political parties in Ghana
