= Ashanti Pioneer =

The Ashanti Pioneer was a private newspaper in Ghana from 1939 to 1962. It was "a major mouthpiece for Asante interests".

== History ==
It was founded in Kumasi in 1939, at the start of World War II, by husband and wife John Tsiboe and Nancy Tsiboe, who operated the Abura Printing Works together. As the war was ending, the newspaper shifted coverage from war to nationalist movement within Ghana. It covered the eventual start of political parties and also played a role in the spreading of information about the new political parties, namely the United Gold Coast Convention (UGCC) with J. B. Danquah as the leader and the Convention People's Party (CPP) led by Dr Kwame Nkrumah.

In October 1962, the government closed down the Ashanti Pioneer and arrested its staff.
