= Kofi Gyenfi II =

Ghanaian politician and military officer (1915–2003)

Kofi Genfi II

Member of the Ghana Parliament for Atwima-Amansie
- In office 1 October 1969 – 13 January 1972
- Preceded by: Isaac Joseph Adomako-Mensah
- Succeeded by: Yaw Joseph Owusu

Personal details
- Born: 23 September 1915 Kumasi, Gold Coast
- Died: 25 January 2003 (aged 87)
- Party: Progress Party
- Profession: Hotelier

Kofi Genfi II (23 September 1915 – 25 January 2003) was a Ghanaian politician, ex-serviceman, and hotelier. He was a member of the Parliament of Ghana for Atwima Amansie during the first Parliament of the Second Republic of Ghana. He served in the Ghana Armed Forces during World War II and managed and owned various hotels throughout his life.

== Early life and education ==
Gyenfi was born on 23 September 1915 in Kumasi, the capital of the Ashanti Region, Gold Coast (now Ghana). He was educated at the Government Boys' School in Kumasi from 1924 to 1933.

== Career and politics ==
Gyenfi started working in 1934 as a private store-keeper in Kumasi until 1938. Later he joined the army and was appointed an Orderly Room Sergeant (ORS), holding that position from 1939 to 1946. During the Second World War he served in India and Burma between 1943 and 1946 while also visiting southern Africa, northern Africa and eastern Africa. When his military unit was demobilized, he was appointed as a Second Division clerk of Kumasi's political administration. He was the leader of the Sada Parantish Movement in Ghana; an honorary secretary of the Ghana Legion in Ashanti; and vice president of the Lambeth Social Club in Kumasi. As a hotelier, he owned the Taj Mahal Hotel in Suame, Kumasi and, later, the Nurom Hotel.

Gyenfi was the chairman of the Suame Branch of the National Liberation Movement. In 1954 he ran for the Atwima Amansie seat and lost. In 1969 during the Second Republic, he ran for the Atwima Amansie seat once again as a member of the Progress Party and won, elected a member of parliament in August.

== Personal life ==
His hobbies included football, draught, and dancing.

Gyenfi died on 25 January 2003, at the age of 87.

== See also ==
- List of MPs elected in the 1969 Ghanaian parliamentary election
