= 1935 Gold Coast general election =

General elections were held in Gold Coast in 1935.

== Electoral system ==
The Legislative Council had 30 members, of which 16 were 'official' members (civil servants) and 14 'unofficial' members. Of the 14 unofficial members, three were Europeans appointed by the Governor to represent banking, mercantile and shipping interests, and two were Europeans elected by the Chamber of Commerce and Chamber of Mines. The remaining nine unofficial members were Africans, six of which were elected by the Provincial Councils (three by the Eastern Province Council, two by the Central Province Council and one by the Western Province Council) and three directly elected members representing the municipalities of Accra, Cape Coast and Sekondi. The elections were held under a severely limited franchise, with only 4,058 people registered to vote in Accra from a population of around 60,000.

== Campaign ==
In Accra the contest was a re-run of the 1931 elections, with incumbent MLC Frederick Nanka-Bruce again challenged by Kojo Thompson. The after-effects of the Great Depression had increased opposition to colonial rule, with Nanka-Bruce's ineffective performance in the Legislative Council benefiting Thompson. The media campaign quickly descended into abuse; Nanka-Bruce was supported only by the Gold Coast Independent (which he owned) and the Times of West Africa, whilst Thompson received the backing of the African Morning Post (and its editor Nnamdi Azikiwe), the Gold Coast Spectator, the Provincial Pioneer and Vox Populi. The African Morning Post accused Nanka-Bruce of being a "sycophantic Uncle Tom, an ultra-moderate stooge, a self-seeker, a traitor and a mummified yes-man". Nanka-Bruce used his Gold Coast Independent to label Thompson as an immoral opportunist in twelve successive issues.

Nanka-Bruce was supported by the Accra Ratepayers Association, the Asere Kowulu Party and the Ga Mashi Party. Thompson was supported by the Mambii Party, the Akwapem Improvement Association, the Ashanti Kotoko Society and the West African Youth League (and its founder I. T. A. Wallace-Johnson). On the day before the elections, the Gã Mantse called on his subjects to vote for Thompson.

== Results ==
As in the 1931 elections, Kobina Arku Korsah was re-elected in Cape Coast and George James Christian in Sekondi. In Accra, Thompson narrowly defeated Nanka-Bruce by 1,030 votes to 926. Voter turnout was surprisingly less than 50%. However, the tactics of Thompson's supporters, which included blocking access to polling stations for elderly Nanka-Bruce supporters, led to the result being overturned in court when Nanka-Bruce challenged the outcome, the official ruling citing "undue influence of gong-gong beating" and 124 cases of impersonation. By the time the re-run took place on 16 April 1936, the Town Clerk had reduced the voter roll to only 2,858 by removing over 1,200 deceased residents. Thompson surprisingly won again with a slightly increased majority of 1,022 votes to 867.
