= Francis Chapman Grant =

Gold Coast businessman (1823–1889 or 1894)

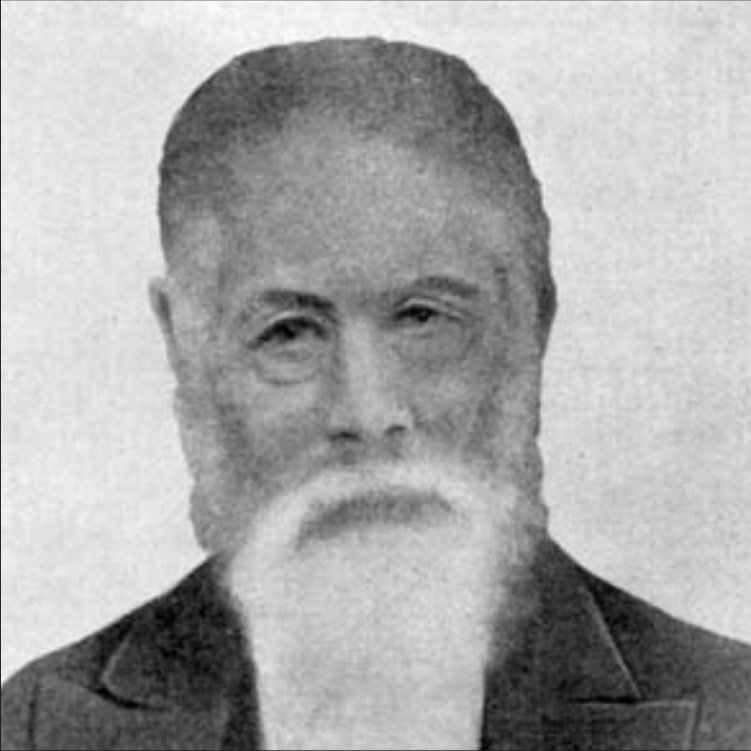
Francis Chapman Grant

Francis Chapman Grant (1823 – 1889 or 1894) was a merchant in the Gold Coast. His nephew was the football player Arthur Wharton, and his grandson was the merchant and politician Paa Grant.

== Biography ==
Son of a British father from Scotland John Chapman Grant and an African mother Ama Ejiriba of Fantiland, Grant was educated in the United States, where according to one story he was a schoolboy contemporary of Ulysses Grant, while he is also listed as his cousin. He became a schoolteacher in his father's native United Kingdom before becoming a merchant in Cape Coast. He was chairman of the Cold Coast Native Concessions Purchasing Company, and from 1858 a member of the Cape Coast Town Council. He played a role as a founding member, Honorary Treasurer and vice-president of the 1867–74 Fante Confederation, and served as an extraordinary and unofficial member of the Gold Coast Legislative Council in 1863–66, 1869, 1871, 1873 and 1887. A member of the Wesleyan Methodist Church, he was a local preacher. He was owner of the Gold Coast Times, a weekly newspaper.

His nephew was Arthur Wharton, the first black professional football player, and his surviving relatives include Hilda Prah (née Abban), David Prah-Annan, Sefa Gohoho of Songhai Africa and Canoe Africa Luxury Magazine.
