= United Love Party =

Ghanaian political party

- Leader: Ramon Osei Akoto
- General Secretary: David Nii Sackey Sosi
- Founder: Ramon Osei Akoto
- Founded: 2008
- Split from: National Democratic Congress
- Headquarters: Cape Coast
- Colours: Purple And White
- Slogan: United Ɛyɛ Free; United Is Free
- Emblem: Purple, Red Heart

The United Love Party (ULP) is a political party in Ghana. It was formed in 2008.

== Elections ==
The founder and leader of the party at its inception was Ramon Osei Akoto. This was to support his bid to stand as a presidential candidate in the 2008 Ghanaian general election. He failed to make it onto the ballot. Four years later, Akoto was again the presidential candidate but once more failed to register with the Electoral Commission of Ghana for the 2012 Ghanaian general election.

== Some policies ==
During a rally in 2011, Akoto suggested that Ghana should break away from international organisations such as the International Monetary Fund (IMF), the World Bank and the United Nations (UN). At a news conference in 2011, Akoto threatened to sue the President of Ghana and the Ministry of Health for allowing the H1N1 vaccine into the country. Akoto also criticised the Ministry of Agriculture for introducing genetically modified seeds into the country as he believed it posed a danger to health. Akoto also pledged the providing of uninterrupted electricity in the country, free utilities and the creation of millions of high paying jobs within four years.

== Alliance ==
The ULP announced that it would be going into an alliance with the leading opposition party at the time, the National Democratic Congress for the 2016 Ghanaian general election.

== University ==
In 2010, the party, announced the launched of its own online university, United Love Party University (ULPU). They described it as the "first political party global university in the world". It was to be a free e-learning university.

== See also ==
- List of political parties in Ghana
