= Ghana Redevelopment Party =

- Leader: Kofi Amoah
- Founded: 1992

The Ghana Redevelopment Party is a political party in Ghana. It is one of thirty-six parties formed since the end of military rule in 1992. It has been inactive and did not contest the 2020 Ghanaian general election.

== See also ==
- List of political parties in Ghana
