= 1927 Gold Coast general election =

General elections were held in Gold Coast in August 1927, the first direct elections in the territory.

== Background ==
The Guggisberg constitution was promulgated in May 1925, and provided for a 30-member Legislative Council with 16 official members and 14 unofficial members. Of the 14 unofficial members, three were Europeans appointed by the Governor to represent banking, mercantile and shipping interests, and two were Europeans elected by the Chamber of Commerce and Chamber of Mines. The remaining nine unofficial members were Africans, six of which were elected by the Provincial Councils (three by the Eastern Province Council, two by the Central Province Council and one by the Western Province Council) and three members representing the three municipalities of Accra, Cape Coast and Sekondi. Western Province Council refused to elect its member, who was substituted by Nana Ofori Atta from the Eastern Province by the Governor.

In 1927 the constitution was amended to allow for the three municipal representatives to be directly elected. However, the franchise was severely limited, with only 1,816 people registered to vote in Accra from a population of 40,000, and 672 in Sekondi (less than 2% of the town's population).

== Campaign ==
Having initially been opposed to the limited electoral representation, moderate African leaders agreed to participate in the elections following a meeting between the Governor and J. E. Casely Hayford, F. V. Nanka-Bruce and John Glover Addo. However, Kobina Sekyi and the Cape Coast branch of the Gold Coast Aborigines' Rights Protection Society (ARPS) continued to refuse to participate. Although Casely Hayford attempted to have Henry van Hien nominated as a candidate in Cape Coast, this was opposed by the local Omanhene and the ARPS, and no candidate was forthcoming.

Prior to the elections, Casely Hayford attempted to form organisations to support himself and his followers. In Accra, the contest was effectively between the National Congress of British West Africa and the ARPS. Several former members of Congress formed the Accra Ratepayers Association in June 1927 with Glover Addo as their candidate. From the ARPS side, A. W. Kojo Thompson (who had been appointed to the Legislative Council in 1926) ran as the Mambii Party candidate, supported by the Mantsemei. However, Thompson's support was weakened by the breakaway Asere Kowulu Non-Party Society, which nominated K. Quartey-Papafio as a protest by the Asere people against Kojo Thompson's selection. Although Quartey-Papafio was not a serious contender in the election, his main aim was to take votes from Kojo Thompson. Neither major candidate had a manifesto, with the campaign instead focusing on their character. Ratepayers member Nanka-Bruce used his newspaper The Gold Coast Independent to denounce Thompson and the Mambii Party.

In Sekondi the Sekondi Municipal Electors Association was formed in June to discuss politics and educate voters. It proposed five candidates, but only two opted to contest the elections – Casely Hayford and George James Christian, a barrister who had immigrated from the West Indies. The main campaign issues were the candidates' political experience, their support from Europeans, and Christian's nationality. Christian used the campaign slogan 'Christian in name, sympathy and attitude.

== Results ==
In Accra, Glover Addo was elected with 380 votes, defeating Kojo Thompson (238 votes) and Quartey-Papafio (147 votes); 765 of the 1,816 registered voters participated. In Sekondi, Casely Hayford easily defeated Christian by 146 votes to 25.

When elections were eventually held in Cape Coast in 1928, Kobina Arku Korsah of the Ratepayers Association was returned unopposed. The Omahene and Sekyi filed a petition against the election, claiming it was not valid without his support. However, the judge ruled that the case "should never have been brought to this court".

== Aftermath ==
Casely Hayford died in 1930. In the subsequent by-election, Christian defeated Roland Crowther Nicol by 90 votes to 57.
