= Kingsley Nyarko =

Ghanaian politician (born 1973)

Hon. Dr. Kingsley Nyarko
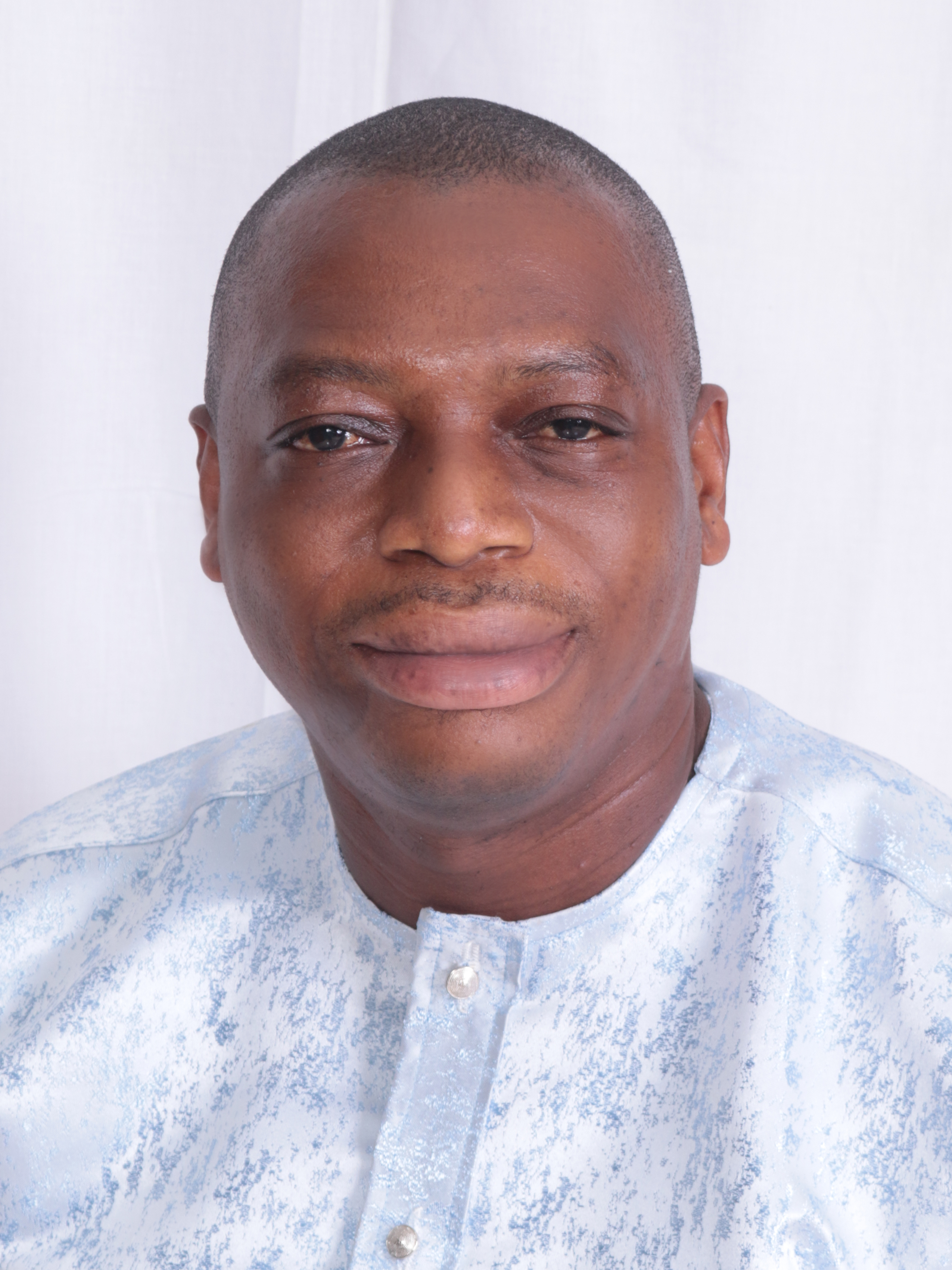

Member of Parliament for Kwadaso Constituency
- Incumbent
- Assumed office 7 January 2021

Personal details
- Born: Kingsley Nyarko; 10 June 1973 (age 53) Obo Kwahu, Ghana
- Party: New Patriotic Party
- Children: Nyarko Godson, University Of Ghana. Isaac Nyarko, KNUST. Rebecca Afia Nyarko, University Of Ghana
- Occupation: Politician
- Profession: Lecturer
- Committees: Poverty Reduction Strategy Committee; Education Committee

Dr. Kingsley Nyarko is a Ghanaian politician and a member of Eighth parliament of the Fourth Republic of Ghana representing Kwadaso constituency within the Ashanti Region of Ghana. He is also the secretary of the National Accreditation Board (Ghana). He is a member of the New Patriotic Party.

== Early life and education ==
Nyarko was born on 10 June 1973 and hails from Obo Kwahu in the Eastern Region, (Ghana). He had his Common entrance in 1986, his Ordinary level in 1992, his Advance level in 1997 and his Teacher Certificate in 1995. He gained his Bachelor in Education in Psychology in 2000, his Masters in Educational Psychology/ Differential Psychology in 2005, and his Ph D in Educational Psychology in 2008.

== Career ==
Nyarko was the headmaster for the Mile 18 Junior High School. He was also a tutor at the Ejisuman Senior High School. He also was the African Representative and Marketing Specialist for Voicecash. He was also the Executive Director of the Danquah Institute. He was a Senior Lecturer at the University of Ghana. He was also the Executive Secretary for the National Accreditation Board.

== Political career ==
Nyarko is a member of the 8th Parliament of the 4th Republic of Ghana representing the Kwadaso Constituency. His political career began in 2020 when he contested the 2020 Ghanaian general elections on the ticket of the New Patriotic Party. He was elected as a member of parliament for the Kwadaso constituency in the 2020 December parliamentary elections. He won the seat after getting 61,772 votes making 87.51% of the total votes cast.

=== Committees ===
Nyarko is member of the Poverty Reduction Strategy Committee and also the member of the Education Committee.

== Personal life ==
Nyarko is a Christian.

== Philanthropy ==
In October 2021, Nyarko donated about 1,000 pieces of school uniforms to Nwamase M/A, Denkyemuoso M/A, Asuoyeboah M/A, Kwadaso M/A, Beposo M/A Block A, and B, Prempeh Experimental M/A Block A, B, and C and also Central Agric Station Primary in the Kwadaso Constituency.
