= Ga Shifimo Kpee =

Ga Shifimo Kpee Ga Shifimɔ Kpee
- Founded: 7 July 1957
- Dissolved: 1957
- Preceded by: Ga State Reformation Association
- Headquarters: Accra
- Youth wing: Tokyo Joes
- Slogan: Ga mei shikpɔn, Ga mei anɔni

The Ga Shifimo Kpee was a political party during the 1st republic of Ghana. The name in the Ga language means "Ga Standfast Society", or the "Ga Steadfast Association".

== History ==
The party was formed as a response to the worsening socio-economic circumstances and environment of the Ga people. The Ga people hail from the Greater Accra Region. Due to the increasing urbanisation and government land purchases in and around Accra, it was felt that they were losing a precious resource. The party thus helped channel the concerns of the Ga people and opposed the Convention People's Party government of Kwame Nkrumah as the main agent depriving the Ga people off their heritage. In addition, many who were affected by the 1937 earthquakes became homeless. Some of the popular slogans of the party included "Ga mei shikpɔn, Ga mei anɔni (Ga lands belong to the Ga people) and "Gboi mli ngbe wɔ (Foreigners are killing us) and "Ga mei abii, nye teashi" (People of Ga descent, arise). The youth wing of the party, "The Tokyo Joes" were involved with clashes with the Nkrumah government which led to the detention of many of them under the Preventive Detention Act of 1958.

The party held its first public inaugural rally as a political party on 7 July 1957 in Accra. The CPP promoted a group called the "Ga Ekomefeemɔ Kpee (Ga Unity Party / Organisation) to limit the growth and influence of the Ga Shifimo Kpee.

== Concerns about Ga lands ==
Following the end of the Second World War, the rapid urbanisation of Accra, the capital led to concerns among the Ga people of being alienated from their lands. The government built a number of housing estates in Accra. The natives felt that their land was being expropriated for foreigners as the locals were not seen to directly benefit from this. These concerns led to the formation of the Ga State Reformation Association in 1945. As these concerns increased during the 1st republic, the movement was formally inaugurated as an opposition party to the CPP government in Accra. Also present at the inauguration from the opposition were J. B. Danquah and S. G. Antor, leader of the Togoland Congress.

== The leaders ==
Two of the original leaders of the Ga Shifimo Kpee were from the CPP. They were Ashie Nikoi and Dzenkle Dzewu. Following the passing of the Preventive Detention Act, some of the leaders went into exile. Ashie Nikoi left for Nigeria where he stayed until his death. The inaugural meeting was presided over by Nii Amunakwa II, Otublohum Mantsɛ (King of Otublohum).

== Party outlawed ==
In 1957, the Nkrumah government passed the Avoidance of Discrimination Act which banned political parties based on tribal, religious or regional basis.

== See also ==
- List of political parties in Ghana
