= Ghana Democratic Republican Party =

Political party in Ghana

- Abbreviation: GDRP
- Chairman: Kofi Amoah
- General Secretary: Kwakye Yiadom
- Founded: 1992
- Headquarters: Accra, Ghana
- Colours: Yellow, Blue and Black
- Slogan: Good democrats for real progress

Election symbol
- A group of Ghanaians sitting in council

The Ghana Democratic Republican Party is a political party registered in Ghana. It was founded in 1992. Its current leader is Kofi Amoah. It holds no seats in parliament at present.

== See also ==
- List of political parties in Ghana
