= Baffour Osei Akoto =

Ghanaian agriculturalist and politician

Bafuor Osei Akoto (1904–2002) was a Ghanaian agriculturalist, traditional ruler and politician. He was the founder and leader of the now-defunct National Liberation Movement and also served as senior linguist to the Asantehene at the Manhyia Palace in Kumasi.

== Early life ==
He was the child of Kofi Owusu Sekyere and Nana Akosua Apea, both of Kwabre, Ashanti, and was a descendant of past holders of the Asantehene office through both parents. Before he was chosen as the chief linguist of the Asantehene, he was a mechanic working with the transportation division of F&A Swanzy Company in the Gold Coast. He enjoyed a lengthy tenure as linguist, serving three successive monarchs of the Ashanti Kingdom, namely, Otumfuo Nana Osei Tutu Agyemang Prempeh II, Otumfuo Nana Opoku Ware II and Otumfuo Nana Osei Tutu II.

== National Liberation Movement ==
In 1954, he organized disaffectioned Ashanti members of the Convention People's Party to form a new political party called the National Liberation Movement. The party later became the United Party after a series of mergers with other political parties.

On Ghana's return to democracy in the early 1990s, the UP tradition re-emerged as the New Patriotic Party, which has gone on to rule the country from 2001 to 2009 and from 2017 to 2025.

He spoke against the one-party state system introduced by Dr. Kwame Nkrumah. His agitation eventually led to his arrest and subsequent imprisonment, as well as a temporary vacation of his office as linguist.

== Relations ==
- Owusu Afriyie Akoto (son) - a Cabinet minister of Ghana.
- Rita Akoto Coker (daughter) - Marketing Consultant and author of 5 novels namely: Serwah, the Saga of an African Princess;The Golden Staff; Boarding Time; The Lost Princess and Fate's Promise.
- John Agyekum Kufuor (stepson) - former President of Ghana.

== See also ==
- National Liberation Movement
