= Thomas Hutton-Mills Sr. =

Ghanaian politician (1865–1931)

- Born: 13 June 1865; James Town, Accra, Gold Coast
- Died: 4 March 1931 (aged 65)
- Education: Cambridge University; Middle Temple
- Occupation: Politician
- Children: Thomas Hutton-Mills Jr.

Thomas Hutton-Mills, born Thomas Hutton Mills (13 June 1865 – 4 March 1931) was a lawyer and nationalist leader in the Gold Coast. He is often referred to as Thomas Hutton-Mills Sr. to distinguish him from his son, the lawyer and diplomat Thomas Hutton-Mills Jr. (1894–1959).

== Life ==
Thomas Hutton Mills was born in James Town, Accra, Gold Coast, the son of Emma Bannerman, the second daughter of Governor James Bannerman, and John Edward Hutton Mills, a James Town merchant. He was educated at the Wesleyan School in Accra and Wesleyan High School, now Mfantsipim in Cape Coast, the Wesleyan High School in Freetown, Sierra Leone, Harrow School and at Cambridge University in the United Kingdom.

After starting work as a commercial clerk, he was a government clerk in the office of the Queen's Advocate, until dismissed for his participation in the protests of September 1886. In 1886, he married Florence Nanka-Bruce, sister of Frederick Nanka-Bruce; after her early death he married another sister, Emma Nanka-Bruce.

After working as chief clerk in the office of his uncle Edmund Bannerman, a barrister and newspaper proprietor, Hutton-Mills travelled to England in 1891 to study law at the Middle Temple, returning to practise in Accra on being called to the Bar in 1894. In 1897, he was prominent in debate over the Town Council and Compulsory Labour Ordinances. In 1898, he was the first African barrister to be elected to the Legislative Council, serving on the council from 1898 to 1904, and again from 1909 to 1919. He was a member of the Accra Town Council from 1905 to 1911. The main adviser to Kojo Ababio, he championed the rights of people in the Alata quarter of Accra. He was the first President of the National Congress of British West Africa in 1920.
