= Thomas Hutton-Mills Jr. =

Ghanaian politician (1894–1959)

- Born: 14 November 1894
- Died: 11 May 1959 (aged 64); London, England
- Education: Cambridge University; Inner Temple
- Occupation: Politician
- Political party: Convention People's Party (CPP)
- Father: Thomas Hutton-Mills Sr.

Thomas Hutton-Mills (14 November 1894, Accra – 11 May 1959, London) was a lawyer, politician and diplomat in the Gold Coast and subsequently Ghana.

== Biography ==
Thomas Hutton-Mills was the son of Thomas Hutton-Mills Sr., a prominent lawyer and politician in the Gold Coast. He was educated at King's Lynn and Cambridge University. Called to the Bar from the Inner Temple in 1921, he practised law in the Gold Coast.

Hutton-Mills became a member of the Convention People's Party (CPP) in August 1949. In September 1949, he was appointed chairman of the CPP advisory board. Other prominent members of the advisory board included Bankole Awoonor-Renner, Kojo Botsio, H. S. T. Provencal and Kwame Nkrumah. The advisory board also included two women, Sophia Doku and Miss Clarke.

Hutton-Mills was imprisoned with other party leaders in 1950 for his part in the boycotts and strikes of that year.

Elected as a member for Accra to the Legislative Assembly in the 1951 elections, Hutton-Mills became Minister for Commerce Industry and Mines, and then Minister of Health and Labour. In 1954, he was dropped from the Cabinet, and replaced by Imoru Egala. Becoming a diplomat, Hutton-Mills was a Deputy Commissioner in London for several years before being appointed Ghana's Ambassador to Liberia.

On his death at a London hospital in 1959, he was 63 years old.

Hutton-Mills was a distant cousin of the late Ghanaian president John Atta Mills.
