= 1946 Gold Coast general election =

General elections were held in the Gold Coast in June 1946. Constitutional amendments on 29 March 1946 enabled the colony to be the first in Africa to have a majority of black members in its legislature; of the Legislative Council's 32 members, 21 were black, including all 18 elected members. The first meeting of the Legislative Council was on 23 July 1946.

== Background ==
A new constitution was promulgated by an Order in Council on 29 March 1946. The new Legislative Council would have 18 elected members and 14 nominated members, and for the first time would oversee the administration of the Ashanti Colony, which had previously been directly ruled by the Governor. Five members would be popularly elected: two from Accra, and one each from Cape Coast, Kumasi and Sekondi. Although these towns had universal suffrage, candidates had to meet strict property requirements. The remainder would be elected in the provinces, by joint provincial councils, having previously been elected by provincial councils alone.

The new constitution demanded elections within three months of its promulgation and the first meeting of the Council within four months.

== Results ==
In the provinces, the Asante Confederacy Council elected two chiefs and two commoners, including I. K. Agyeman, while the Joint Provincial Council of Chiefs elected seven royals and two commoners: C. G. Baeta and J. B. Danquah. The two members elected in Accra were Frederick Nanka-Bruce and Akilagpa Sawyerr, both from the Accra Ratepayers' Association, while Charles William Tachie-Mension was elected in Takoradi. The governor nominated Robert Ben-Smith, E. E. Dadzie, Nii Amaa Ollennu, M. B. Taylor and H. W. Thomas.
