= Elections in Ghana =

Ghana elects on national level a head of state, the president, and a legislature. The president is elected for a four-year term by the people. According to the constitution, each President can be elected for only two (four-year) terms after which they are no longer eligible to run for Presidency. The Parliament of Ghana has 276 members, elected for a four-year term in single-seat constituencies. Unlike the Presidency, parliamentarians are eligible to run for as many terms as possible so long as they are of sound mind.

== Electoral system of Ghana ==
The presidential election is won by having more than 50% of valid votes cast, whilst the parliamentary elections is won by simple majority, and, as is predicted by Duverger's law, the voting system has encouraged Ghanaian politics into a two-party system, creating extreme difficulty for anybody attempting to achieve electoral success under any banner other than those of the two dominant parties. Elections have been held every four years since 1992.

Presidential and parliamentary elections are held alongside each other, generally on 7 December every four years.

To qualify as a Presidential candidate, the person is required to be Ghanaian citizens by birth, be at least 40 years old, and must be of sound mind. Again, the person must either be nominated by a political party or stand as independent candidate, provided the necessary requirements are met, including a full payment of presidential filing fees. Presidential campaigns typically span several months to years leading up to Election Day. Candidates are allowed to engage in rallies, debates, and media appearances to communicate their vision and developmental policies (manifestos) for the country and garner support from voters. Ghanaian citizens aged 18 and above are eligible to vote in presidential elections.

Ghana is divided into constituencies, each represented by a Member of Parliament (MP). Similar to the Presidential elections, each political party presents a list of candidates for each constituency, and voters cast their ballots. Non-aligned or independent candidates are equally eligible to stand for parliamentary elections. Candidates' filing fees for parliamentary elections is always lower compared to the presidential filing fees.

The Presidential and Parliamentary elections are organized, conducted and supervised by the Electoral Commission of Ghana(EC), the official body responsible for public elections and referendums in Ghana. The Commission, headed by the Electoral Commissioner, operates independently and has the mandated by the constitution to ensure the integrity and transparency of the electoral process. The EC also superintendents over nationwide voter registration, candidate nomination, ballot printing, polling station setup, collation, tabulation and announcement of election results.

== See also ==
- Electoral calendar
- Electoral system
- Electoral Commission of Ghana
- List of general elections in Ghana

== Ethnic voting in Ghana ==
Ethnic voting is the idea that people utilize candidates' ethnic identity to decide who can be best trusted to follow through with their promises for goods to their coethnic constituents as payment for their vote. This form of vote buying in which one's vote is paid for through a targeted public good is known as clientelism and is especially popular in sub-Saharan African countries. Kanchan Chandra, one of the leading academics in Ethnic Politics, claims that there are several causes for this phenomenon in Africa. First, the individual has an incentive to seek out public goods for their vote because of one's perception that their vote individually will not lead to altering the election. Through this logic, Chandra displays that there is an incentive for people to organize for casting their vote within this context because, even if the one does not benefit from this vote individually, their collective vote may allow this group some access to favoritism from the candidate if they win thus establishing greater value in their collective votes. Furthermore, the candidate has an incentive to provide benefits to groups for their vote because an individual method of distributing jobs and services may create conflict in which providing a good to one voter may deprive another voter of that same good; therefore, a group method of distribution both allows for less conflict and greater insurance for the voter that the candidate will follow through on their end. To gain access to a salient group that desires jobs and services to target as well as establish credibility among that group, candidates often use their own ethnic identity, or coethnics, as a targeted community. Furthermore, the history of colonialism within most African countries means that ethnic identity tends to be more salient and available for candidates' access through appeals to shared ethnicity.

=== Ethnic Voting and Composition of Region ===
Ethnic favoritism in Ghana has been shown to be a method of gaining votes; however, the effectiveness among voters may vary between diverse and homogeneous communities. While not conducted in Ghana, research in sub-Saharan Africa has found that community investments are significantly more likely to occur in which there are more homogeneous communities. This displays how communities largely composed of one ethnicity may be benefiting from ethnic voting at the local level. The allocation of public goods to a homogeneous area is claimed to be a direct result of ethnic favoritism. While examining how people in Ghana vote within homogeneous, rural communities versus more diverse communities, another study finds support for this theory in that more homogeneous communities are more likely to vote for the party that supports their ethnicity. Furthermore, when there are ethnic minorities within a homogeneous and rural community, they are more likely to vote for the opposition party or their non-coethnic. The researcher explains this as voting based on the mutual benefit of targeted public goods. In this example, minorities within this homogeneous and rural community would equally benefit from the public goods placed in their area as the majority. Therefore, the minority is more likely to advocate for this candidate even though they do not specifically favor their ethnic identity. In contrast, other researchers argue that minority groups within these communities vote along non-coethnic lines due to voter intimidation. This is supported by observing how voting among these minorities for non-coethnic candidates does not vary between locations that have public goods and those that do not. Another researcher's findings display how the choice of voting by ethnicity may depend also on public versus private goods. Similarly, another researcher finds that homogeneous communities are more likely to vote for the candidate that supports their ethnic identity and minorities within those ethnically homogeneous communities are more likely to support the opposition party because they are more likely to obtain access to public goods that the homogeneous community receives. Additionally, this study also finds that diverse and urban communities often have less ethnic voting when considering public goods. However, this study also finds that ethnic minorities are more likely to have an expectation that they will receive private goods if they are within poor communities, even if they are the ethnic minority of a community.

Additionally, research shows the ethnic voting at the local level in Ghana may have greater implications for national elections. For example, ethnic voting towards the presidency may depend on the amount of clientelism taking place for local elections. This theory, "reverse coattails", supports the idea that clientelism surrounding ethnicity at the local level incentivizes individuals to participate at the party level thus aligning them with the party of a presidential candidate that their local official supports. Therefore, the support that local officials gain through co-ethnic clientelism also creates support for the executive candidate in the same party.

=== Implications of Ethnic Voting ===
Research has also displayed that the ethnic association created within politics may cause greater conflict and implicit biases between ethnic groups. Because candidates have mobilized ethnic groups through clientelist practices, ethnic groups create stronger ties to their ethnicity around times of competitive elections. By examining how people define themselves (by ethnicity, language, economic status, etc.), one cross-national study found data that when elections are closer and more competitive, it is more likely that people will identify with the ethnic category associated with their ethnicity. This supports the idea that ethnic identity is largely bound to politics because it has historically been used as a political tool. In Ghana, this theory has been supported by studying the microeconomic interactions between people of different ethnic groups. After collecting data on the price of taxis in a field experiment at various time points around an election, the study found that non-coethnics were charged more, on average, than non-ethnics. However, at election time, non-coethnics that were affiliated with an opposing political party (non-copartisans) were charged even more, while non-coethnics affiliated with the same party (copartisans) were charged less. Thus, when ethnic groups are nested in political parties, it can reduce discrimination between ethnic groups within a party but exacerbate discrimination between ethnic groups affiliated with opposing parties.

=== Alternative Opinions ===
Although these studies argue that ethnic voting is prevalent in Ghana due to the lack of political information available, other research indicates Ghanaian people do not vote primarily due to ethnicity. This research emphasizes that, although there is less information available to Ghanaian people, they are still more likely to choose a candidate based on past performance and policy plans. Therefore, there are articles indicating that the prevalence of clientelism and ethnic voting only account for a small portion of the population. Other research indicates that while clientelism is a signal of viability to voters in Ghana, it is not alone capable of "buying" one's vote. Therefore, candidates are still reliant on the information they are able to obtain concerning past political performance to judge candidates' performances. This election organization in which gifts are necessary to be seen as a viable candidate is seen as manufactured by years of clientelist practices. As candidates from different parties competed to buy votes, this transaction became standard as a way of interacting with voters.
