= United Development System Party =

Political party in Ghana

- Leader: Tetteh Kabraham Early
- Founded: 2012
- Slogan: Unity The Best

The United Development System Party is a Ghanaian political party registered with the Electoral Commission of Ghana. It was founded in 2012. Its first leader in 2012 was Tetteh Kabraham Early.

== See also ==
- List of political parties in Ghana
