= United Democratic Party (Ghana) =

Political party in Ghana

- Leader: Yaw Kumey
- Founder: Yaw Kumey

The United Democratic Party is a Ghanaian political party registered with the Electoral Commission of Ghana. Its founder is Yaw Kumey.

Ghana has two main political parties—the National Democratic Congress (NDC) and the New Patriotic Party (NPP)—making it very challenging for other parties to succeed in elections.

A total of 29 political parties are governed by the Political Parties Act 574, enacted in 2000. This law outlines the procedures for forming, registering, operating, and financing political parties in Ghana. The Electoral Commission is responsible for overseeing and regulating these parties.

== See also ==
- List of political parties in Ghana
