= 1951 Gold Coast general election =

- February 8, 1951

All 38 elected seats in the 84 member assembly 43 seats needed for a majority
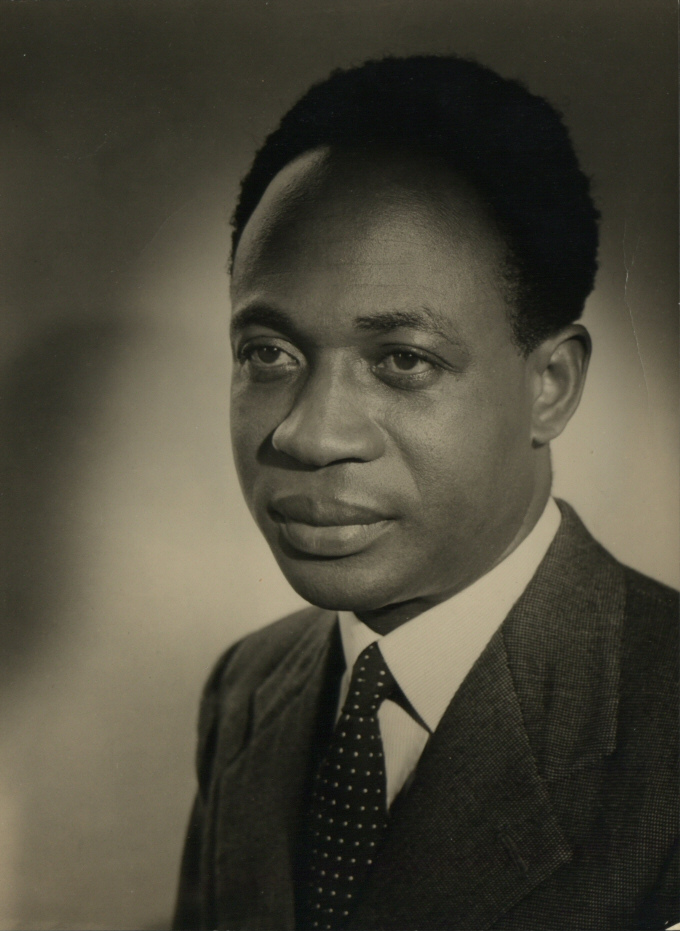
	First party	Second party	Third party
		UGC	Ind
Leader	Kwame Nkrumah	George Alfred Grant
Party	CPP	UGCC	Independent
Seats won	34	3	1

General elections were held in Gold Coast on 8 February 1951. Although elections had been held for the Legislative Council since 1925, the Council did not have complete control over the legislation, and the voting franchise was limited to residents of urban areas meeting property requirements and the councils of chiefs.

== Background ==
Amongst growing calls for self-governance, such as the 1948 Accra Riots and unrest (which led to the arrest of the Big Six), the Coussey Committee was commissioned by the United Kingdom government. Its report led to the 1951 constitution, which gave the Executive Council an African majority, and created an 84-member Legislative Assembly, 38 of whom were to be elected by the people, 37 representing territorial councils, six appointed to represent commercial interests and three ex officio members appointed by the Governor. Those representing commercial interests and appointed by the Governor were all white.

== Campaign ==
A total of 117 candidates contested the 38 elected seats. The Convention People's Party (CPP) contested every seat, while the United Gold Coast Convention and National Democratic Party provided its main opposition. There were also several independent candidates, as well as the Asante Kotoko party. General Secretary of the CPP, Kojo Botsio, won the Winneba seat unopposed, the only candidate to do so.

Nkrumah's aide and later Finance Minister Komla Agbeli Gbedemah is credited with organising the entire campaign while Nkrumah was still in Fort James prison, detained by the colonial government. Nkrumah duly won the Accra Central Municipal seat.

== Results ==
Kwame Nkrumah's Convention People's Party won 34 of the 38 elected seats in the assembly, claiming all five seats and nearly 95% of the vote in urban areas; Nkrumah himself winning the Accra Central seat with 22,780 of the 23,122 votes cast. In rural areas the CPP won 29 of the 33 seats, taking around 72% of the vote. The main opposition, the United Gold Coast Convention, fared badly, winning only three seats, and was disbanded following the elections. Former members of the UGCC went on to form the Ghana Congress Party (which later became the United Party). The other parties were unsuccessful.

The CPP was also supported in the Assembly by 22 of the indirectly elected members, and thus held 56 of the 84 seats.

Party	Urban areas (direct election)			Rural areas (electoral colleges)			Total seats
Party	Votes	%	Seats	Votes	%	Seats	Total seats
Convention People's Party	58,585	91.31	5	1,950	71.88	29	34
United Gold Coast Convention	5,574	8.69	0	763	28.12	3	3
National Democratic Party	5,574	8.69	0	763	28.12	0	0
Independents	5,574	8.69	0	763	28.12	1	1
Total	64,159	100.00	5	2,713	100.00	33	38
Registered voters/turnout	90,725	–					
Source: Sternberger et al., Bob-Milliar

== Aftermath ==
After winning the Accra Central seat, Nkrumah was released from prison, and was appointed "Leader of Government Business", before becoming the country's first Prime Minister the following year after a constitutional amendment.

Another new constitution was promulgated in 1954, followed by elections the same year, also won by the CPP. Following another convincing election victory by Nkrumah's party in 1956, Gold Coast became the first sub-Saharan African state to gain independence (aside from apartheid South Africa) on 6 March 1957, changing its name to Ghana.

== See also ==
- List of MLAs elected in the 1951 Gold Coast general election
