= Power Unity Party =

Ghanaian political party

- Leader: Eliahu Boateng
- Chairperson: Alhassan K. Richard
- Secretary: Gifty Ogyefo
- Founder: Eliahu Boateng
- Founded: 21 November 2019

Website
- https://powerunityparty.org/

The Power Unity Party is a Ghanaian political party. It received a provisional certificate from the Electoral Commission of Ghana in 2018. It received its final certificate on 21 November 2019. It did not field any candidate for the 2020 Ghanaian general election. The leader Eliahu Boateng, is a pastor by profession.

The party's slogan is Sankofa. Sankofa in Twi means broadly to return to one's roots. The party's colours are red and gold.

== See also ==
- List of political parties in Ghana
