= Ghana National Party =

Political party in Ghana

- Leader: Kobina Amo-Aidoo
- Chairperson: Kobina Amo-Aidoo
- General Secretary: Simon K. Dewotor
- Founder: Kwaku A. Danso
- Founded: 2007
- Headquarters: Accra
- Colors: Blue, white and gold
- Slogan: Redeem Ghana Now! Now! Now!
- Parliament: 0 / 275

Election symbol
- Piled Up Palms

The Ghana National Party is a political party in Ghana. It was founded in 2007 and launched in May 2008. It contested the December 2008 elections but did not win any parliamentary seats. Its current leader is Kobina Amo-Aidoo.

== See also ==
- List of political parties in Ghana
