= United Renaissance Party =

Political party in Ghana

- Abbreviation: URP
- General Secretary: Alhassan Saeed
- Founder: Eric Charles Kofi Wayo
- Founded: 2007
- Registered: 2007
- Split from: New Patriotic Party
- Headquarters: Accra
- Colors: Orange, White, Green and Yellow
- Slogan: Putting Ghana Right

The United Renaissance Party is a Ghanaian political party registered with the Electoral Commission of Ghana. It was founded in 2007. The first leader was Kofi Wayo.

In an interview in 2009, Kofi Wayo stated that the electoral rules in Ghana needed overhauling.

Wayo declared in 2017 that he was leaving politics for farming. He said he was keen to support farmers in villages while suggesting that politicians did not do so.

== See also ==
- List of political parties in Ghana
