= People's Destiny Party =

Ghanaian political party

The People's Destiny Party is a Ghanaian political party. It is one of the parties registered with the Electoral Commission of Ghana to contest elections. The party is not represented in the contest for President of Ghana in the 2020 Ghanaian general election. Its logo shows a white lamb on a circular background. The upper half of the circle is black and the lower half green. Below the circle is written the name of the party in capitals.

== See also ==
- List of political parties in Ghana
