= Yes People's Party =

Political party in Ghana

- Leader: Annin – Kofi Addo
- Chairperson: Annin – Kofi Addo
- General Secretary: Stephen Amo Dabanka
- Founded: 2012
- Headquarters: Dansoman, Accra
- Colors: gold, metallic black, red
- Slogan: Te-Na-Fa Keep Profits In Ghana
- 7th Parliament 4th Republic: 0 / 275

Election symbol
- House, Maize, Yam, &Fish

The Yes People's Party is a political party in Ghana. It was founded in 2012. Its leader is Annin – Kofi Addo. Its offices are based at Dansoman, a suburb of Accra. It was registered in September 2012 by the Electoral Commission of Ghana. Though it fielded a candidate, one Courage Kwame Mensah Azumah in 2012 for the Ketu South Constituency, it could not win the parliamentary seat. It however was unable to field candidates during the Ghanaian general election, 2016.

The party's colours are gold, metallic black and red. Its emblem includes a house, maize, yam and fish.

== See also ==
- List of political parties in Ghana
