= Kofi Wayo =

Ghanaian politician and businessman (c. 1955–2026)

- Born: Charles Eric Kofi Wayo c. 1955; Kofi Pare, Gold Coast
- Died: 7 November 2026 (aged 71); Accra, Ghana
- Education: Albany High School, Georgia
- Occupation: Businessman
- Title: Leader of United Renaissance Party
- Political party: United Renaissance Party (URP)

Kofi Wayo (c. 1955 – 7 November 2026) was a Ghanaian politician and businessman.

== Early life and education ==
Wayo was born in Kofi Pare in the Eastern Region of Gold Coast around 1955. His parents were illiterate and so he was not certain of his date of birth. His parents were Kwashie Akakpo, a cocoa farmer and soldier and his wife Dede Aku who hails from Doryumu in the Greater Accra Region. He was the first of ten children. The family moved to Nima, a suburb of Accra. The family was poor and he was a hawker in his childhood. He started his primary education in the Eastern Region and continued at the Myahyong Middle Mixed School in Accra. He later left Ghana to join Captain Charles Simons, a friend of his father in Georgia, United States (USA) who subsequently adopted him. He attended Albany High School for four years.

== Work ==
Wayo settled in Detroit, Michigan, where he started with odd jobs such as washing cars. Later on, he started selling guns in the USA. He progressed to become an arms dealer. In 1988, he sold his gun-trading company and went into the oil business.

== Politics ==
Wayo, on his return to Ghana, was opposed to the sitting president of Ghana, Jerry Rawlings. He thus supported the main opposition party, the New Patriotic Party (NPP). He claimed he wanted to support the President, John Kufuor. He wanted to contest the Ayawaso East parliamentary seat but failed to be the NPP candidate. He also became disillusioned with the leadership of the NPP. He left to join the People's National Convention (PNC) before finally leaving in frustration to form his own party, the United Renaissance Party (URP) in 2007. He was the leader and candidate of the party for the position of President of Ghana.

In 2017, Wayo announced that he was quitting politics and going into farming. He expressed disillusionment with the two largest political parties in the country, describing them as seeking their own selfish interests and said he would rather go into supporting and helping farmers.

After leaving politics, he kept a very low profile and rarely appeared in public.

== Personal life and death ==
Wayo married twice. He had two daughters who were both born in the United States. Wayo died in Accra on 7 November 2026, at the age of 71.
