= Josephine Addoh =

Ghanaian politician

Hon. Josephine Addoh

Member of Parliament for Kwadaso Constituency
- In office 7 January 2005 – 6 January 2009
- President: John Kufuor
- Succeeded by: Dr Owusu Afriyie Akoto

Personal details
- Born: Josephine Hilda Addoh; 27 September 1957 (age 68)
- Party: New Patriotic Party
- Occupation: Self-employed

Josephine Hilda Addoh is a Ghanaian politician and a member of the New Patriotic Party. She was the Member of Parliament for the Kwadaso Constituency in the fourth parliament of the fourth Republic of Ghana.

== Early life and education ==
Addoh was born on 27 September 1957. She holds a Bachelor of Arts degree. She is a self-employed real estate businesswoman.

== Political career ==
Known for her speaking prowess and analysis, she is a member of the New Patriotic Party. She became a member of parliament from January 2005 after emerging winner in the General Election in December 2004. She was elected as the member of parliament for Kwadaso constituency in the fourth parliament of the fourth Republic of Ghana and also became a member of the Pan-African Parliament where she once led a delegation to Zimbabwe during the Mugabe-Tsvangirai elections.

== Elections ==
Addoh was elected as the member of parliament for the Kwadoso constituency of the Ashanti Region of Ghana for the first time in the 2004 Ghanaian general elections. She won on the ticket of the New Patriotic Party. Her constituency was a part of the 36 parliamentary seats out of 39 seats won by the New Patriotic Party in that election for the Ashanti Region. The New Patriotic Party won a majority total of 128 parliamentary seats out of 230 seats. She was elected with 43,929 votes out of 52,830 total valid votes cast. This was equivalent to 83.2% of total valid votes cast.

She was elected over Joseph Yammin of the National Democratic Congress, Essien Daniel of the Convention People's Party and Owusu Ansah Cosmos of the Every Ghanaian Living Everywhere party. These obtained 7,173, 1,436 and 292 votes respectively of total valid votes cast. These were equivalent to 13.6%, 2.7% and 0.6% respectively of total valid votes cast.

== Personal life ==
Addoh is a Christian.

== See also ==
- List of MPs elected in the 2004 Ghanaian parliamentary election
