= 1944 Gold Coast general election =

General elections were held in Gold Coast in 1944.

== Electoral system ==
The Legislative Council had 30 members, of which 16 were 'official' members (civil servants) and 14 'unofficial' members. Of the 14 unofficial members, three were Europeans appointed by the Governor to represent banking, mercantile and shipping interests, and two were Europeans elected by the Chamber of Commerce and Chamber of Mines. The remaining nine unofficial members were Africans, six of which were elected by the Provincial Councils (three by the Eastern Province Council, two by the Central Province Council and one by the Western Province Council) and three directly-elected members representing the municipalities of Accra, Cape Coast and Sekondi.

== Campaign ==
In Cape Coast, the contest between Tufuhin Moore and Kofi Bentsi-Enchill saw both candidates using their supporters to bring voters to polling stations and trying to block their opponents voters from voting.

== Results ==
In Cape Coast, Moore defeated Bentsi-Enchill by 298 votes to 232. Akilagpa Sawyerr was elected in Accra and C. W. Tachie-Menson in Sekondi.
