= Permai Education Foundation =

Permai Education Foundation Yayasan Pendidikan Permai
- Pluit Karang Barat Blok O – VI, Pluit, Penjaringan, North Jakarta, Indonesia

Information
- Type: Private, Public
- Established: 1 May 1979
- Colors: blue, red, yellow
- Nickname: Sekolah Permai, YPP
- Website: www.permai.or.id

Permai Education Foundation (Indonesian: Yayasan Pendidikan Permai (YPP) is a private education institution founded in 1979 by Laviana Kurniawan who wished to improve the quality of education.

YPP manages schools such as:

- Permai (Preschool - Primary - Secondary – Senior High School) with National curriculum.
- Permai Plus (Nursery - Kindergarten - Primary -Secondary) with National Plus curriculum.

== YPP history ==
On 1 May 1979, a playgroup was opened in a house located at Pluit Permai V/7, North Jakarta. The playgroup was moved to a new building at Pluit Utara No.2 along with the opening of Pre-school in July 1980. Primary was opened in 1981. YPP provided a new building in 1984/1985 at Pluit Samudera Raya No. 9 for Secondary and Senior High School. Since July 1993 until now, the school has occupied a 1600 m^{2} at Jl. Pluit Karang Barat Blok O-VI, Pluit, Penjaringan, North Jakarta. In The academic year 2005/2006 the Foundation opened Permai Plus School to face the era of globalization.

== YPP philosophy ==
- To accommodate every pupil’s right to choose his/her belief
- The success of creating intelligent individuals is the result of hard work and effort
- The character building of each pupil must be initialized since early childhood

== Facilities ==
YPP provides main facilities such as:

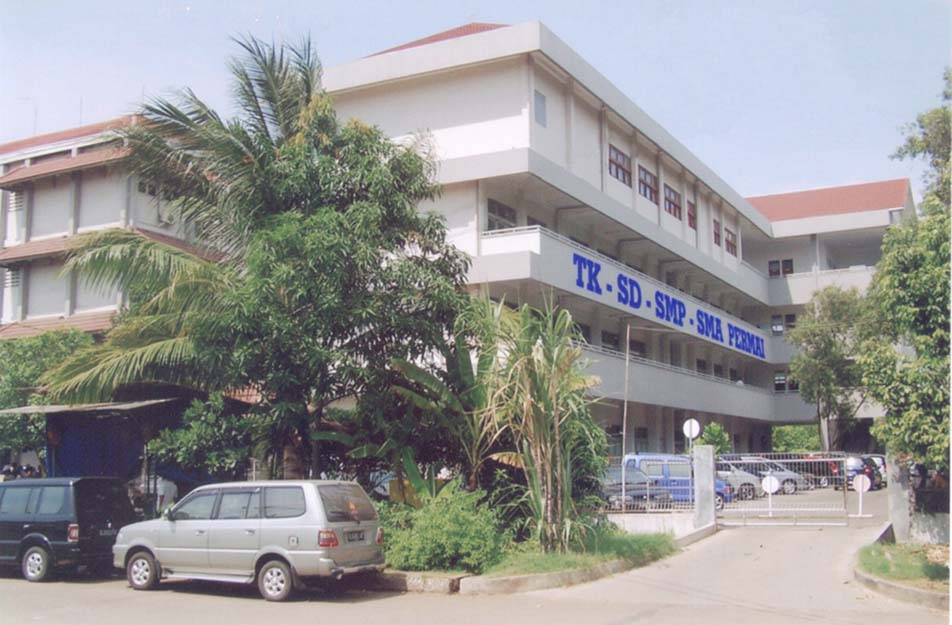
The school building taken from the front side.

Building. YPP has two buildings; the old building for Permai School (Pre-school – Primary – Secondary – Senior High School) and the new building for Permai Plus School (Nursery – Kindergarten – Primary - Secondary). All rooms are equipped by air-conditioners included Physics and Chemistry/Biology laboratories.

Laboratory. There are Biology and Chemistry laboratory (combined), Language laboratory, Physics laboratory, and Computer laboratory in the school. There is also a particular place for hydroponics.

Library. There are three libraries in YPP which are main library, Permai Pre-school library, and Permai Plus School library. There are various kinds of books, newspapers, magazines and several computers with internet access in the main library.

Audio-visual. Audio Visual Room is equipped with a laptop, an LCD projector, a multimedia player and a 42 inch television.

Sports facilities. There are a basketball courtyard, futsal field, badminton courtyard, and tennis courtyard in YPP. Here is also a special room for table tennis. There are a mini swimming pool, a playroom, and a playground particularly for Permai Preschool.

Hall. This large room is utilized for special occasions such as art performances, seminars, graduation ceremonies, etc.

Cafetaria. There are two special places for eating and gathering.

== Organizational structure ==
- Founder : Laviana Kurniawan
- Superintendent : Jungestu Nuralam
- Chairman : Djoko Wihardjo
- Secretary : Darwis Hartono
- Treasurer : Henny Kusumo
- Head of Pre-school : Indah
- Head of Primary : Julita
- Head of Secondary : Anne Maria
- Head of Senior High School : Robertus Kusnandar
- Head of Permai Plus : William Chandra

== Extracurriculars in Permai National ==
They have 9 extracurriculars (in 2024, SMP):

- Badminton
- Band
- Modern Dance
- Theater
- Futsal
- Cooking (for 9th graders)
- Japanese Class
- Basketball (for girls)
- Basketball (for boys)
