= 1931 Gold Coast general election =

General elections were held in Gold Coast in 1931.

== Electoral system ==
The Legislative Council had 30 members, of which 16 were 'official' members (civil servants) and 14 'unofficial' members. Of the 14 unofficial members, three were Europeans appointed by the Governor to represent banking, mercantile and shipping interests, and two were Europeans elected by the Chamber of Commerce and Chamber of Mines. The remaining nine unofficial members were Africans, six of which were elected by the Provincial Councils (three by the Eastern Province Council, two by the Central Province Council and one by the Western Province Council) and three directly-elected members representing the municipalities of Accra, Cape Coast and Sekondi.

== Campaign ==
Incumbent MLC for Accra John Glover Addo declined to run for a second term. The Accra Ratepayers Association had several potential candidates, including F. V. Nanka-Bruce, Emmanuel Charles Quist and Akilagpa Sawyerr, eventually settling on Nanka-Bruce. Quist claimed he had been the initial choice, but then rejected when it was revealed that he was not a member of the Association. Although this was denied by the Association, Quist formed the Ga Democratic Party to contest the elections. Quist's candidacy split the vote in the educated elite, with several prominent citizens (including J. B. Danquah and Augustus Molade Akiwumi) calling for his election.

== Results ==
In Accra Frederick Nanka-Bruce of the Accra Ratepayers' Association was elected with 806 votes, defeating A. W. Kojo Thompson of the Manbii Party (558 votes) and Quist (343 votes) on a 69% turnout. Kobina Arku Korsah was re-elected in Cape Coast and George James Christian re-elected in Sekondi.
