= National Democratic Party (Gold Coast) =

Historical political party in colonial Ghana

- Leader: Nii Amaa Ollennu
- Founded: May 1950
- Dissolved: May 1952
- Merged into: Ghana Congress Party
- Headquarters: Accra

The National Democratic Party (NDP) was a right-wing political party active in the Gold Coast in the early 1950s.

The party was formed in May 1950 with the merger of the Accra Ratepayers' Association and the Manbii Party. It was led by Nii Amaa Ollennu, with Frederick Nanka-Bruce as chairman. It supported a gradual transition to self-government, under the slogan "Sure, Solid, Self-government". It campaigned against Kwame Nkrumah's Convention People's Party (CPP), claiming that the CPP's candidates were inexperienced and extreme, while its candidates were both experienced and respectable. The British colonial officials welcomed the formation of the party, but privately expressed doubts about its popular appeal.

At the 1951 Gold Coast legislative election, the party ran in co-ordination with the United Gold Coast Convention (UGCC). It also aligned itself with two parties which did not contest the election, the People's Democratic Party, based in Kumasi, and the Independent Party, based in Cape Coast. The party did not win any seats; in the largest constituency, Accra, Ollennu took only 742 votes, and his running mate, Kofi Adumoa Bossman, 666, while Nkrumah won 20,780 and Thomas Hutton-Mills Jr., also of the CPP, 19,812. Two UGCC candidates also beat the NDP.

In May 1952, the party merged with the UGCC and dissident members of the CPP, to form the Ghana Congress Party.
