= Kobina Arku Korsah =

Ghanaian judge

Sir Kobina Arku Korsah JSC
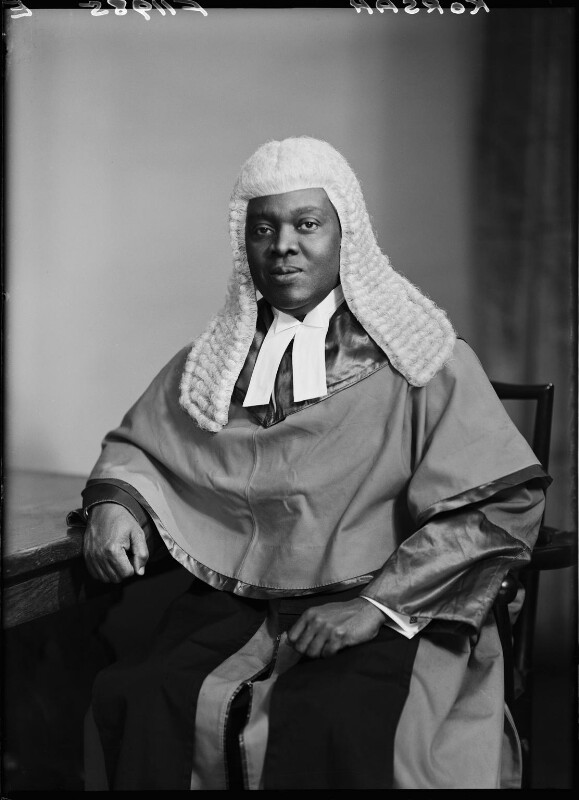
- Korsah in 1949

1st Chief Justice of Ghana
- In office 6 March 1957 – December 1963
- Preceded by: New Position
- Succeeded by: Julius Sarkodee-Addo

13th Chief Justice of the Gold Coast
- In office 1956 – 6 March 1957
- Preceded by: Sir Mark Wilson
- Succeeded by: Himself as the 1st Chief Justice of Ghana

Personal details
- Born: 3 April 1894 Saltpond, Gold Coast (British colony)
- Died: 25 January 1967 (aged 72) Ghana

Sir Kobina Arku Korsah JSC (3 April 1894 – 25 January 1967) was the first Chief Justice of Ghana (then the Gold Coast) in 1956.

== Biography ==
Born in Saltpond, Korsah was educated at Mfantsipim School, Fourah Bay College (BA degree in 1915), Durham University and London University (LLB in 1919).

Korsah returned to the Gold Coast in 1919 practising as a barrister specialising in commercial law. He also became political active. He joined the National Congress of British West Africa, attaining the role of assistant secretary of the Cape Coast branch in 1922. The same year he was elected as a member of the Gold Coast Aborigines’ Right Protection Society executive.

Korsah won the Cape Coast seat in the 1927 Gold Coast general election. He was one of nine Africans to be represented in the Legislative Assembly at the time. He was re-elected for the same seat in 1931 and 1935 general elections.

In 1942, Nana Sir Ofori Atta and Sir Arku Korsah were the first two Ghanaians to be appointed to the Executive Council of the Legislative Council by the then Governor of the Gold Coast, Sir Alan Burns.

Korsah was one of the 20 founding members of the Ghana Academy of Arts and Sciences in 1959.

After the Kulungugu attack on President Kwame Nkrumah in August 1962, Sir Arku Korsah presided over the trial of five defendants. At the end of that trial, three of the accused were found not guilty and this displeased the Nkrumah government. Nkrumah sacked Sir Arku as Chief Justice in December 1963 unconstitutionally.

== Family ==
He was married to Kate Ethel Amanuah Bannerman-Hyde. Their five children were: Diana (1924- ), Evangeline Mabel (1926-2013), Roger Kweku Andoh (1927-2017), Annie Barbara Gyaanuah (1931- ) and Kate Ethel Esi Amanuah (1935-2013). His only son, Roger who was a high court judge in Ghana, moved to Zimbabwe where he became a judge on the Supreme Court of Zimbabwe. He died in February 2017.

== See also ==
- Chief Justice of Ghana
- List of judges of the Supreme Court of Ghana
- Supreme Court of Ghana

Legal offices
Preceded by Sir Mark Wilson	Chief Justice of the Gold Coast; 1956–57	Succeeded by Gold Coast became independent as the Dominion of Ghana on 6 March 1957
Preceded by Ghana became an independent Dominion	Chief Justice of Ghana; 1957–63	Succeeded by Julius Sarkodee-Addo
