= Paa Grant =

Ghanaian politician (1878–1956)

George Alfred Grant
- Born: 15 August 1878; Beyin, Western Nzema, Gold Coast
- Died: 30 October 1956 (aged 78); Axim, Ghana
- Other name: Paa Grant
- Occupations: Merchant, politician
- Known for: Founding president of the United Gold Coast Convention (UGCC)
- Children: Sarah Esi Grant, Mrs Rosamond Hammond-Grant, William Minneaux Grant
- Parent(s): William Minneaux Grant and Madam Adjoa (Dwowa) Biatwi
- Relatives: Francis Chapman Grant (grandfather); Phyllis Christian (granddaughter); Kim Tyrone Grant (grandson) Yvonne Candice Hammond (granddaughter), The Hammond family

George Alfred Grant, popularly known as Paa Grant (15 August 1878 – 30 October 1956), was a merchant and politician in the Gold Coast who has been called "the father of Gold Coast politics". As a political activist, he was the founder, financer and the first president of the United Gold Coast Convention (UGCC) in August 1947. He was also one of Ghana's Founding Fathers. He paid for Kwame Nkrumah to return to Ghana from the United States. A roundabout, Paa Grant Roundabout has been named after George Grant in Sekondi Takoradi in his memory. Many opinion leaders have said it will be right to mention his name in the struggle for Ghana's independence the same vein as the 'Big Six '.

== Biography ==
=== Education and early career ===
Grant was born in 1878 in Beyin, Western Nzema, into an influential merchant family. He was the son of William Minneaux Grant and Madam Adjoa (Dwowa) Biatwi of the Aboradze clan, and the grandson of Francis Chapman Grant, proprietor of the Gold Coast Times and treasurer of the Fanti Confederation.

Grant was educated at Wesleyan School in Cape Coast now Mfantsipim School and through private tuition given by Joseph D. Abraham, a wealthy merchant friend of his father's. Grant was subsequently employed in the timber trade, first at Axim and then for five years in the Ivory Coast. In 1896, he established his own firm, George Grant and Company. He prospered as a timber merchant, with a flourishing export business, at a time when the trade was dominated by European companies.

He visited Britain in 1905 and by the time the First World War broke out in 1914, he had built up business contacts with leading timber companies in Europe and the United States. Between 1914 and 1919 he chartered ships to transport timber to Britain and the USA. He opened his own offices in London, Liverpool and Hamburg between 1920 and 1922, and in the Gold Coast he expanded operations to Dunkwa, Sekondi and Akim Abuakwa. In 1926 he was appointed to the Legislative Council, representing Sekondi. Grant was also a member of the Aborigines' Rights Protection Society and was instrumental in many developmental projects, including introducing street lighting and pipe-borne water to Sekondi and Axim.

=== Political activism and later life ===
During and after the Second World War, Grant realised that Africans in the Gold Coast were suffering under many colonial practices that were discriminatory and unfavourable, and he decided to take steps to deal with the inadequacy of representation of African interests. He invited J. B. Danquah and others to a meeting to launch a nationalist party. Some 40 people, including lawyers R. A. Awoonor-Williams, Edward Akufo-Addo, and Emmanuel Obetsebi-Lamptey, met in Saltpond and the United Gold Coast Convention (UGCC) was founded on 4 August 1947, with the goal of achieving self-government. Kwame Nkrumah was elected UGCC secretary general, after being recommended by Ebenezer Ako-Adjei, and Grant paid Nkrumah's £100 boat fare to return to Ghana from Liverpool that year.

Nkrumah later split from the UGCC to form the Convention People’s Party (CPP), and Grant eventually concentrated more on his businesses than politics. However, they maintained contact, and Nkrumah visited him two days before Grant's death in Axim on 30 October 1956, at the age of 78. In 1955 he had suffered an attack of apoplexy from which he never completely recovered.

== Family and personal life ==
Current surviving children are Sarah Esi Grant, Mrs Rosamond Hammond-Grant, William Minneaux Grant, and numerous grand- and great-grandchildren across the globe.

Sarah Esi Grant-Acquah, is the mother of lawyer Phyllis Christian.

Other known grandchildren are: Georgina Grant, Margaret Grant, Stella Blay-Kwofie, Christine Blay-Kwofie, Dorothy Blay-Kwofie, Joyce Christian, Letitia Hammond, Rosamond Hammond, James Hemans Hammond, Matilda Hammond, Georgina Hammond, Emmanuel Hammond, George Hammond, Alberta Hammond, Lawrence Hammond, Yvonne Hammond, Samuel Duker-Ako, George Grant, Felix Grant, Sabina Grant, Kweku Robert Grant, Kwesi Brown Grant, Frances Grant, Maame Efua Lartey-Grant, Sefa Gohoho of Songhai Africa, a Panafrican Luxury Consumer Goods. Known great grand children are:Angela Kukua Blay-Kwofie, Kwesi, Blay-Kwofie.

== Memorial and legacy ==
In honour of Grant's role in the struggle for Independence, the Ghana government named a new flyover after him at Caprice, in Accra.

=== Paa Grant Soccer Academy ===
The Paa Grant Soccer Academy was formed in 2009 by Kim Tyrone Grant, a former national player for Ghana Black Stars, to honour his grandfather's "dedication and work ethic helping bring freedom and independence to all Ghanaians from colonial rule until 1957".

=== George Grant University of Mines and Technology ===
On 12 January 2018, President Akufo-Addo announced during a special congregation held at the university, the renaming of the University of Mines and Technology (UMaT) which is located in the Western Region of Ghana, to the George Grant University of Mines and Technology in honour of him being a founding father of Ghana's fight towards independence and also being a native of the western region.
