= Kwadaso (Ghana parliament constituency) =

Constituency in the Ashanti Region of Ghana

- constituency for the Parliament of Ghana
- District: Kumasi Metropolitan District
- Region: Ashanti Region of Ghana

Current constituency
- Created: 2004
- Party: New Patriotic Party
- MP: Kingsley Nyarko

Kwadaso is one of the constituencies represented in the Parliament of Ghana. It elects one Member of Parliament (MP) by the first past the post system of election. Kwadaso is located in the Kumasi Metropolitan district of the Ashanti Region of Ghana.

This seat was created prior to the Ghanaian parliamentary election in 2004.

== Boundaries ==
The seat is located within the Kumasi Metropolitan District of the Ashanti Region of Ghana.

== History ==
The constituency was first created in 2004 by the Electoral Commission of Ghana along with 29 other new ones, increasing the number of constituencies from 200 to 230.

== Members of Parliament ==
Election	Member	Party	Ref
2004	Constituency created		
2004	Josephine Hilda Addoh	New Patriotic Party	
2008	Dr. Owusu Afriyie Akoto	New Patriotic Party	
2012	Dr. Owusu Afriyie Akoto	New Patriotic Party	
2016	Samiu Kwadwo Nuamah	New Patriotic Party	
2020	Kingsley Nyarko	New Patriotic Party	

== Elections ==
2004 Ghanaian parliamentary election:Kwadaso Source:Ghana Home Page
Party	Candidate	Votes	%	±%
New Patriotic Party	Josephine Hilda Addoh	43,929	83.2	N/A
National Democratic Congress	Joseph Yammin	7,173	13.6	N/A
People's National Convention	Cosmos Owusu Ansah	1,436	2.7	N/A
Convention People's Party	Daniel Essin	292	0.6	N/A
Majority		36,756	69.6	N/A

== See also ==
- List of Ghana Parliament constituencies
