= Akilagpa Sawyerr (lawyer) =

Ghanaian lawyer and political activist

Akilagpa Sawyerr (2 March 1883 – 13 December 1948), born Gosford Collins Sawyerr and also known as Akilagpa Osabramba Sawyerr, was a Ghanaian lawyer and political activist.

Sawyerr was born in the British colony of the Gold Coast, which would become Ghana in 1957. (Note: The Gold Coast became the Dominion of Ghana in 1957 and Ghana declared itself a republic in 1960.) He helped to establish the National Congress of British West Africa, a body that agitated for African self-government and also the political party known as the Accra Ratepayers Association, whose goal was to elect members to the Accra town council and eventually Parliament.

From 1932 to 1946, he served on the Accra Town Council and, in 1947, he became a member of the Legislative Council of the Gold Coast as a representative for the capital.

== Early life and education ==
Sawyerr was born in Accra on 2 March 1883. His father, J. W. Sawyerr, was a merchant and his mother, Christiana Kwaley Sawyerr, was a member of the royal family of Owooman Faase.

Sawyerr attended the Wesleyan Mission School in Accra, followed by Wesleyan Boys' High School and Fourah Bay College, both in Sierra Leone. In 1902, he went to England to study law at Durham University. He obtained a bachelors of arts in 1906 and was called to the Bar of England and Wales at Lincoln's Inn in 1907.

== Career and political activism ==
Sawyerr became politically active while studying in London. He was a contemporary of Alfred Nikita Mangena. They were both studying for the bar exams at Lincoln's Inn one of the four inns of court able to admit lawyers to the Bar of England and Wales. Mangena spearheaded the founding of the United African Association for black students in London and Sawyerr was a founding member, attending a group meeting on 9 March 1906.

The same year, the Bambatha Rebellion began in Mangena's native Colony of Natal (present-day South Africa), where indigenous Africans rose up against British colonial rule. Mangena and Sawyerr, mere law students at the time, engaged a barrister to file an appeal to the Judicial Committee of the Privy Council, the highest court of appeal for the British Empire, concerning the death sentences given to men during the uprising in relation to the deaths of two colonial policemen.

After finishing his studies, Sawyerr returned to the Gold Coast, where he set up in private practice in 1920. The same year, Sawyerr became a founding member of the National Congress of British West Africa, one of the earliest organisations to work towards African emancipation. At the group's first conference, he represented the Gold Coast and introduced a session on judicial reforms.

Sawyerr was also a founding member of the Accra Ratepayers' Association, whose objects were "educating public opinion generally as to the proper methods of electing people to the Town Council and a municipal member to the colony's Legislative Council."

Sawyerr was elected to the Accra Town Council in 1932, 1934, and 1936 for the Accra Ratepayers' Association political party. In 1934, he was a member of the Committee of Twelve "formed solely to seek the support of the [native] Chiefs for a broad-based protest movement" against the making of two ordinances - a Sedition Ordinance and a Waterworks Ordinance. The committee would lead to the establishment of the Central National Committee, another body to advocate for self-government. Mid-1934, Sawyerr also represented the Gold Coast and Ashanti as part of a delegation to London to petition the government in relation to the two ordinances. The petition was made in July and the delegation met with the Secretary of State for the Colonies.

The same year, 1934, Sawyerr joined the Scottsboro Defence Committee established by Isaac Wallace-Johnson, to raise money for the defence of the Scottsboro Boys, black boys falsely accused of rape in Jim Crow America.

In 1937, Sawyerr was serving as one of four native "unofficial" members of the Accra Town Council. Sawyerr was not a candidate for election in 1938. However, he was re-elected to the council in 1944. Also that year, he was a member of the constitutional committee that considered a new constitution for the Gold Coast. The constitution, adopted in 1946, was referred to as the Burns' constitution after the governor who was the driving force behind it. It was the first constitution for the Gold Coast to have more elected members than appointed members and, therefore, to give the public the opportunity to elect more than half of the members of the national legislature. Sawyerr was subsequently elected to the Legislative Council as a representative for Accra for the Accra Ratepayers' Association political party; he gave his maiden speech in March 1947.

== Personal life ==
Sawyerr was also a keen sportsman and member of numerous sports and social organisations. He was the founder of the Tudu Lawn Tennis Association and the Rodger Club and co-founder of the Accra Turf Club. He was also a member of the Gold Coast Red Cross and a patron of the Masqueraders Association of Accra.

Sawyerr married Charlotte Amy Mettle. One of their children is the academic, Akilagpa Sawyerr.

Sawyerr died on 13 December 1948 at age 65.
