= Frederick Nanka-Bruce =

Physician, journalist and politician in the Gold Coast

Frederick Victor Nanka-Bruce
- Born: Frederick Victor Nanka-Bruce; 9 October 1878; Accra, Gold Coast
- Died: 13 July 1953 (aged 74); Conakry, Guinea
- Education: University of Edinburgh
- Occupation: Medical Doctor Politician
- Spouse: Elizabeth Aku Bruce

Frederick Victor Nanka-Bruce (9 October 1878 – 13 July 1953) was a physician, journalist and politician in the Gold Coast. He was the third African to practise orthodox medicine in the colony, after Benjamin Quartey-Papafio and Ernest James Hayford.

== Early life and family ==
Frederick Victor Bruce was the scion of two prominent Ga families; his mother was Christiana Reindorf and his father, Alexander Bruce, was an Accra merchant. The Bruces were from James Town or British Accra, while the Reindorfs were from Danish Accra or Osu. His father was a descendant of a prominent Ga trader named Robert William Wallace Bruce, while his mother was a relative of the Basel Mission catechist, later pastor and historian, Carl Christian Reindorf. Bruce appended "Nanka" in honour of his ancestor, Robert William Wallace Bruce, who was also known as Nii Nanka.

Nanka-Bruce was educated at the Government School in Accra and at the Wesleyan Boys' High School in Lagos. After an apprenticeship to a dispenser in Accra, he was a member of the 1900 Kumasi Expedition - besieged in Kumasi Fort with the Governor, Frederick Hodgson, until the expedition managed to break through the Ashanti lines to the coast. In 1901 he travelled to study medicine at the University of Edinburgh, graduating in 1906 with an MB ChB. He worked at the London Hospital before returning to Accra in 1907.

== Political career ==
Nanka-Bruce built up a private medical practice in Accra, and was a government adviser on public health. In 1918 he founded The Gold Coast Independent newspaper. He was elected to the Legislative Council representing the Accra Ratepayers' Association in 1931, serving until 1935 and again from 1946 to 1950. In 1950, the Ratepayers' Association became part of the National Democratic Party, with Nanka-Bruce serving as the party's chairman. He was awarded the O.B.E. in 1935. In 1933 he was a co-founder and the first president of the Gold Coast Medical Practitioners Union, and in 1951 a co-founder and first president of the Ghana branch of the British Medical Association; after Nanka-Bruce's death the two organisations would merge to form the Ghana Medical Association. From 1952 to 1953, he served as chairman of the Board of Governors of the Accra Academy.

His sister Florence, and after her early death another sister Emma, married Thomas Hutton-Mills, Sr. He died 13 July 1953. His descendants still live in Accra and include the Ghanaian disc jockey William Nanka-Bruce and CEO of Ga Mantse Foundation NeeLante Bruce.
