= Togoland Congress =

Defunct political party in Gold Coast colony

Togoland Congress Organisation Organisation de congrès au Togoland
- Leader: S. G. Antor
- Founded: 1951
- Dissolved: 1957
- Merged into: United Party
- Ideology: Ewe nationalism
- 1954 elections: 3
- 1956 elections: 2

Election symbol
- Yellow five pointed star on a white background

Party flag

The Togoland Congress (TCP) was a political party formed in 1951 which had won three seats in the Gold Coast elections of April 1954 and two seats in the July 1956 elections, but did not survive for long afterwards. The Togoland Congress's goal was to campaign for the unification of the Ewe people in British Togoland and French Togoland as a separate Ewe state; however the party yet again failed in the May 1956 UN plebiscite held in British Togoland, which had resulted in the unification of British Togoland and the Gold Coast.

The symbol of the party was a five pointed star in yellow on a white background.

== Parliamentary elections ==
Election	Number of TC votes	Share of votes	Seats	+/-	Position	Outcome of election
1956	20,352	2.92%	2	▼1	▼4th	Minority in parliament
1954	25,214	3.57%	3		3rd	Minority in parliament
