= United Party (Ghana) =

- Leader: Kofi Abrefa Busia
- Founded: 13 October 1957
- Dissolved: 1964
- Merger of: National Liberation Movement; Northern People's Party; Anlo Youth Organisation; Muslim Association Party; Togoland Congress; Ga Shifimo Kpee
- Headquarters: Accra

The United Party was the main opposition party in the First Republic of Ghana. It was the only opposition party throughout its existence from 1957 until 1964 when Ghana became a one party state.

== Formation ==
After Ghana attained its independence on 6 March 1957, the Parliament of Ghana passed the Avoidance of Discrimination Act, 1957 (C.A. 38), which banned all parties and organizations that were confined to or identifiable to any racial, ethnic or religious groups with effect from 31 December 1957. The title of the Act was:

An Act to prohibit organizations using or engaging in tribal, regional,

racial and religious propaganda to the detriment of any community, or securing the election of persons on account of their tribal, regional or

religious affiliations and for other purpose connected therewith.

This law meant that all the existing political parties would become illegal. These parties included the Northern People's Party, Muslim Association Party, National Liberation Movement (NLM), Anlo Youth Organization, Togoland Congress and the Ga Shifimo Kpee. They therefore merged under the leadership of Kofi Abrefa Busia as the United Party. This took place on 13 October 1957.

== Demise ==
The party's effectiveness as the opposition suffered when it was no more recognised as the official opposition after Ghana became a republic in 1960. In September 1962, the National Assembly passed a resolution calling for a one-party state. This was accepted following a referendum in January 1964. This effectively sounded the death of all opposition parties in Ghana and this situation persisted until February 24, 1966 when the Nkrumah government was overthrown in a coup d'état.

== Political tradition ==
The United Party, though it was an amalgam of all opposition parties of the time, was dominated by the NLM which was the biggest opposition party before its formation. The NLM saw some of its roots in the Ghana Congress Party and the United Gold Coast Convention. The following parties all claimed their roots from the "UGCC - UP tradition".

- Progress Party - led by Busia and formed Busia government between 1969 and 1972.
- Popular Front Party - led by Victor Owusu, was the largest opposition party between 1979 and 1981.
- New Patriotic Party - first led by Albert Adu Boahen.

== See also ==
- List of political parties in Ghana
