= Ghana Congress Party =

- Leader: Kofi Abrefa Busia
- Founded: May 1952
- Dissolved: 1954
- Merger of: United Gold Coast Convention and National Democratic Party
- Split from: Convention People's Party
- Merged into: National Liberation Movement
- Headquarters: Accra
- 1954 elections: 1

Election symbol
- Blue elephant on a white background

The Ghana Congress Party was founded in May 1952 by Kofi Busia who was also its leader. The party was formed by dissatisfied former Convention People's Party members, along with the United Gold Coast Convention (UGCC) and the National Democratic Party, which had both suffered poor performances in the 1951 elections, and soon dissolved. The party contested the 1954 election, winning one out of 104 seats. The party represented the conservative position of the chiefs and intelligentsia who were dominant in the UGCC.

The symbol of the party was a blue elephant on a white background.

After the Gold Coast legislative election in 1954, Busia and others went on to join the National Liberation Movement.

== Parliamentary elections ==
The party performed poorly in the 1954 Gold Coast general election, winning only one seat. A number of well known members of the party lost their seats.

Election	Number of GCP votes	Share of votes	Seats	+/-	Position	Outcome of election
1954	32,168	4.55%	1	+	3rd	Minority in parliament.

Kofi Busia, who was in the Legislative Assembly after being elected by the Asanteman Council in 1951, won a seat from the popular vote this time round, winning the Wenchi West seat. J. B. Danquah lost his seat to a relative, Aaron Ofori-Atta of the CPP. William Ofori Atta also lost his Akim Abuakwa West seat to the CPP. Mabel Dove Danquah, a journalist and former wife of J. B. Danquah, became the first elected female member, beating Nii Amaa Ollennu to the Ga Rural seat for the CPP. Edward Akufo-Addo contested the Akwapim South seat but lost.
