= 1956 Gold Coast general election =

- July 17, 1956

All 104 seats in the legislative assembly 53 seats needed for a majority
- Turnout: 697,257 (50.1% of registered voters)
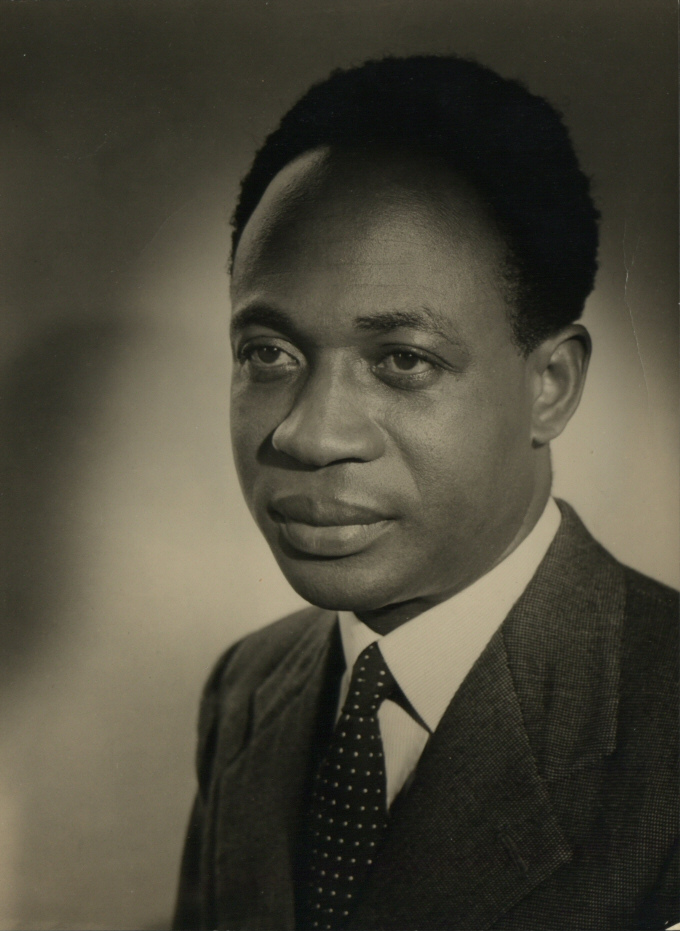
	First party	Second party	Third party
		NPP	NLM
Leader	Kwame Nkrumah	Simon Diedong Dombo	J. B. Danquah
Party	CPP	NPP	NLM
Last election	71	15	N/A
Seats won	71	15	12
Seat change	▼1	Steady	▲12
Popular vote	391,817	68,709	145,657
Percentage	57.10%	10.39%	20.89%

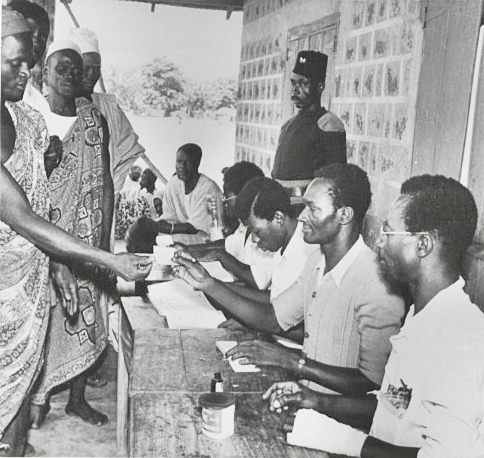
A voter receives a ballot paper from a polling assistant at Kumbungu Polling Station in the Northern Territories.

General elections were held in the Gold Coast (soon to become Ghana) on 17 July 1956. The result was a victory for Kwame Nkrumah's Convention People's Party, which won 71 of the 104 seats.

A new constitution, approved on 29 April 1954, established a cabinet composed of African ministers drawn from an all-African legislature chosen by direct election. In the following general election, the Convention People's Party won the majority of seats in the new Legislative Assembly.

== Background ==
A new constitution, approved on 29 April 1954, established a cabinet composed of African ministers drawn from an all-African legislature chosen by direct election. In the elections that followed, the Convention People's Party won the majority of seats in the new Legislative Assembly. In May 1956, Prime Minister Nkrumah's government issued a white paper containing proposals for Gold Coast independence. The British Government stated it would agree to a firm date for independence if a reasonable majority for such a step were obtained in the Gold Coast Legislative Assembly after a general election.

== Results ==
Party	Votes	%	Seats	+/–
Convention People's Party	398,141	57.10	71	–1
National Liberation Movement	145,657	20.89	12	New
Northern People's Party	72,440	10.39	15	0
Togoland Congress	20,352	2.92	2	–1
Muslim Association Party	11,111	1.59	1	0
Federation of Youth	10,745	1.54	1	0
Independents	38,811	5.57	2	–9
Total	697,257	100.00	104	0
Registered voters/turnout	1,392,874	–		
Source: Nohlen et al.

== Aftermath ==
After pro-independence parties won a convincing majority, the British government agreed to grant the colony independence. This happened on 6 March 1957, with the country renamed Ghana. Initially a constitutional monarchy with Elizabeth II as head of State, the country's democratic credentials were hampered by the Preventive Detention Act (1958). In 1960 a referendum resulted in the country becoming a republic with a presidential form of government, and in 1964 it became a one-party state. Nkrumah was eventually overthrown in 1966.

== See also ==
- List of MLAs elected in the 1956 Gold Coast general election
