= 1954 Gold Coast general election =

- June 15, 1954

All 104 seats in the legislative assembly 53 seats needed for a majority
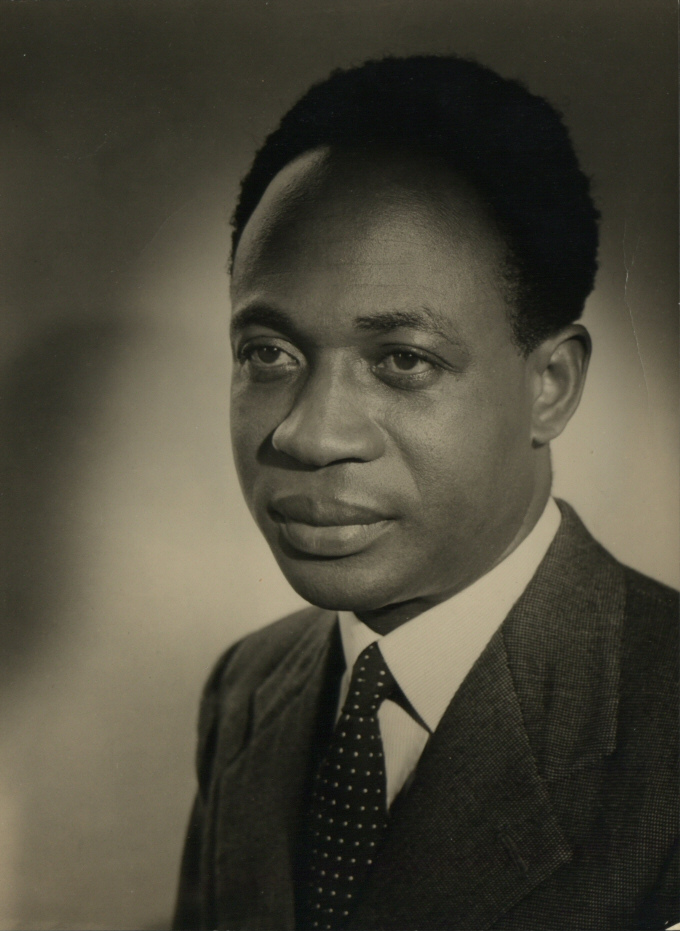
	First party	Second party
		NPP
Leader	Kwame Nkrumah	Simon Diedong Dombo
Party	CPP	NPP
Leader's seat	Accrah Central
Last election	34	N/A
Seats won	72	15
Popular vote	391,817	68,709
Percentage	55.44%	9.72%

General elections were held in the Gold Coast on 15 June 1954. They were the first elections under full adult suffrage in the Gold Coast. The result was a victory for Kwame Nkrumah's Convention People's Party, which won 72 of the 104 seats.

== Background ==
The election was held following the approval of a new constitution on 29 April 1954. The new constitution meant that assembly members were no longer elected by the tribal councils, the Assembly was enlarged, and all members were chosen by direct election from equal, single-member constituencies. It established a cabinet composed of African ministers, and only defence and foreign policy remained in the hands of the governor; the elected assembly was given control over the majority of internal affairs.

== Results ==
Party	Votes	%	Seats
Convention People's Party	391,817	55.44	72
Northern People's Party	68,709	9.72	15
Ghana Congress Party	32,168	4.55	1
Togoland Congress	25,214	3.57	3
Muslim Association Party	21,172	3.00	1
Anlo Youth Organisation	11,259	1.59	1
Independents	156,401	22.13	11
Total	706,740	100.00	104
Registered voters/turnout	1,225,603	–	
Source: Sternberger et al.

== Aftermath ==
In May 1956 Nkrumah's government issued a white paper containing proposals for Gold Coast independence. The British Government stated it would agree to a firm date for independence if a reasonable majority for such a step were obtained in the Gold Coast Legislative Assembly after a general election. This election was held in July 1956, and resulted in another win for the CPP. Gold Coast became the independent nation of Ghana on 6 March 1957.

== See also ==
- List of MLAs elected in the 1954 Gold Coast general election
