= Muslim Association Party =

Political party in Ghana

The Muslim Association Party (MAP) was a political party in the Gold Coast, active from 1954 to 1957. It was a leftist party that had its main support base among Muslims in the Gold Coast.

The MAP grew out of the Gold Coast Muslim Association, which was established as a welfare and social association in 1932. Involved in politics by the early 1950s, it became the Muslim Association Party in 1954. Most of its leaders opposed the ruling Convention People's Party (CPP), and the MAP was one of the parties which merged in 1957 to join the United Party. One of the party's leading figures, Kweku Bankole Awonoor-Renner, was a communist and a convert to Islam, who had received ideological and military training in the Soviet Union in the 1920s. He had worked together with Kwame Nkrumah in the 1940s, but split with him around 1952 as Nkrumah (influenced by his aide George Padmore) moved towards anti-communism and partial conciliation with the British government.

The symbol of the party was a crescent and a star in white on a green background. After Ghana achieved independence and the merger of the opposition parties into the United Party was completed, remnants of the MAP were swept away by the CPP government, a process which included imprisoning the country's Chief Imam.
