= National Liberation Movement (Ghana) =

- Leader: J. B. Danquah
- Founder: Bafuor Osei Akoto
- Founded: 19 September 1954
- Dissolved: 1957
- Merger of: United Gold Coast Convention, National Democratic Party
- Split from: Convention People's Party
- Merged into: United Party
- Headquarters: Accra
- 1956 election: 12 seats

The National Liberation Movement (NLM) was a Ghanaian political party formed on 19 September 1954. Set up by disaffected members of the Convention People's Party, who were joined by Kofi Abrefa Busia, the NLM opposed the process of centralization whilst supporting a continuing role for traditional leaders. It was led by Baffour Akoto, linguist to the Asantehene. The party gained some support in the 1956 Gold Coast general election and became the third largest party in the Assembly with 12 seats, behind the Convention People's Party and the Northern People's Party.

The Avoidance of Discrimination Act, passed by Kwame Nkrumah in 1957 outlawed parties based on racial, regional, or religious differences and as such the NLM became part of the newly formed opposition group the United Party.
