= United Gold Coast Convention =

Former political party in colonial Ghana which fought for independence (1947-52)

- Leader: George Alfred Grant
- Secretary: Kwame Nkrumah
- Spokesperson: Kwame Nkrumah
- Founder: George Alfred Grant
- Founded: 4 August 1947
- Dissolved: 1952
- Merged into: Ghana Congress Party
- Headquarters: Accra
- Ideology: Conservatism Nationalism
- Political position: Centre-right
- 1951 elections: 3

The United Gold Coast Convention (UGCC) was an early nationalist movement in the British colony of the Gold Coast (present-day Ghana) that sought independence after the Second World War. It was founded on the 4th of August 1947 with the aim of self-government "in the shortest possible time" by educated Africans such as J.B. Danquah, A.G. Grant, R.A. Awoonor-Williams, Edward Akufo Addo (all lawyers except for Grant, who was a wealthy businessman), and others. There was also involvement from people, including merchants and graduate teachers, who contributed to the UGCC. It was a nationwide movement that aimed to draw chiefs and people together, restore leadership to Ghanaians, knit together existing organisations, and prepare for the time when the country would be self-governing. J.B. Danquah, who was the president of the UGCC when it was founded, invited Kwame Nkrumah to become the secretary of the Convention in 1947, who began to work immediately. The leadership of the organization called for the replacement of Chiefs on the Legislative Council with educated persons. The United Gold Coast Convention appointed its leaders to include Nkrumah, who was the Secretary General. However, upon an allegation of plans against Nkrumah's leadership, he was arrested and jailed. The UGCC leadership broke up and Kwame Nkrumah went on to form the Convention People's Party (CPP) in 1949 for self-governance. In March 1948, Nkrumah was arrested and detained alongside other leaders of the UGCC. The arrest by the British authorities was due to political activism. Nkrumah then quit the UGCC following his release and went on to create the CPP (Convention People's Party). In 1949, this party aimed to bring together a wide range of political interests.

== History ==
In the 1940s, African merchants, such as George Alfred Grant ("Paa Grant"), were ready to finance the organization of a political movement to assure their commercial interests in the face of unfair colonial practices. The party was founded by George Alfred Grant on 4 August 1947 by a combination of chiefs, academics and lawyers, including R. A. Awoonor-Williams, Robert Samuel Blay, Edward Akufo-Addo, and Emmanuel Obetsebi-Lamptey.

On 10 December 1947, Kwame Nkrumah returned to the Gold Coast, accepting Danquah's invitation to become the UGCC General Secretary. Big Six member Ebenezer Ako-Adjei recommended inviting Nkrumah, whom he had met at Lincoln University. Nkrumah was offered a salary of £250, and Paa Grant paid the boat fare from Liverpool in England to the Gold Coast. Danquah and Nkrumah subsequently disagreed over the direction of the independence movement. Nkrumah went on to form the Convention People's Party (CPP) in 1949 and eventually became the first president of independent Ghana. In March 1948, Nkrumah was arrested and detained alongside other leaders of the UGCC. The arrest by the British authorities was due to political activism. Nkrumah then quit the UGGC following his release and went on to create the Convention People's Party (CPP) in 1949, this party aimed to bring together a wide range of political interests. Nkrumah was renowned for having a strained relationship with the UGCC, and his experience in places such as London where he received more training. There was a meeting between Nkrumah and members of the party which occurred in Saltpond, a town in the Central region. It was said that Nkrumah rejected a proposal for the promotion of fundamental human rights.

The UGCC performed poorly in the 1951 elections, winning only three seats. The following year, it merged with the National Democratic Party and disaffected members of the CPP, to form the Ghana Congress Party.

=== Parliamentary elections ===
Election	Number of UGCC votes	Share of votes	Seats	+/-	Position	Outcome of election
1951	6,337	36.81%	3		2nd	Minority in parliament

Three party members won seats in the election, including J. B. Danquah for Akim Abuakwa Central and William Ofori Atta, Principal of the Abuakwa State College, for Akim Abuakwa West, both in the Eastern Province. The third was Gerald Otoo Awuma for Akpini-Asogli in the Trans-Volta Togoland.

== The United Gold Coast Convention and independence ==
The UGCC was essential in planting the seeds for Ghana’s decolonisation and the road to independence. Due to his leadership in the UGCC and previously the CPP, he held a lot of power, which was then a catalyst for independence for Ghana. The UGCC lost the election in 1951, which resulted in them becoming the parliamentary opposition. However, the actions and commitment of the CPP were critical in moving the country towards independence.

== See also ==
- Gold Coast (British colony)
- The Big Six (Ghana)
