= Political history of Ghana =

The Political history of Ghana traces the evolution of governance in Ghana from pre-colonial times through the colonial era and into the post-independence period. Before European intervention, Ghana was a diverse region composed of multiple states and ethnic groups, each with distinct political structures. These systems fell into three primary categories: centralized states (such as the Ashanti Empire, which had a highly organized bureaucratic and military system), non-centralized societies (including smaller, kinship-based communities like the Dagomba and Ewe, which relied on consensus-based leadership), and theocratic states (such as those led by spiritual rulers who combined religious and political authority).

With the onset of British colonial rule, governance varied across the four territorial possessions of the Gold Coast—namely the Colony of the Gold Coast, Ashanti, the Northern Territories, and British Togoland. The British initially ruled directly but later adopted indirect rule in the late 19th century, drawing inspiration from its success in Northern Nigeria. Under this system, British officials governed through local traditional rulers, maintaining their authority while exerting colonial control.

By the 1940s, growing nationalist sentiment among Ghanaians, fueled by grievances over economic exploitation and political marginalization, led to an intensified demand for self-governance. This pressure resulted in a series of constitutional reforms aimed at increasing African participation in governance. A major milestone was reached in 1952 with the establishment of the office of the Prime Minister of Ghana, a position created as part of the transition to full self-rule. Kwame Nkrumah, a key leader in the independence movement and founder of the Convention People's Party (CPP), became Ghana’s first Prime Minister, setting the stage for full independence, which was achieved on March 6, 1957—making Ghana the first African nation to break free from colonial rule.

The Gold Coast gained independence in 1957 under the legal name of Ghana. Prime Minister, Kwame Nkrumah was elected as the 1st President of Ghana in 1960. The government of Kwame Nkrumah won the approval of a constitutional referendum in 1964, that made Ghana a One-party state and him, president for life. The Nkrumah government was deposed in a Coup initiated by the National Liberation Council. Ghana became a Republic once more on 1 October 1969 when the National Liberation Council handed power over to civilian rule. A new constitution was drafted based on the parliamentary system of government in the United Kingdom. Between 1972 and 1979, Ghana fell under the rule of several military dictators. John Jerry Rawlings led an uprising on 4 June 1979 which transitioned the country to democratic rule by September 1979.

In 1981, John Rawlings seized the country in a Coup and the military government ruled Ghana until 1993, when a transition process was in place to hand over power from the military back to civilian rule. The 4th Republic was inaugurated on 7 January 1993.

== Pre-colonial Ghana ==
There were three main forms of political systems among the natives of Pre-colonial Ghana. These were centralized states, Non-centralized groups and Theocracies.

=== Centralized States ===
==== Ashanti Empire ====
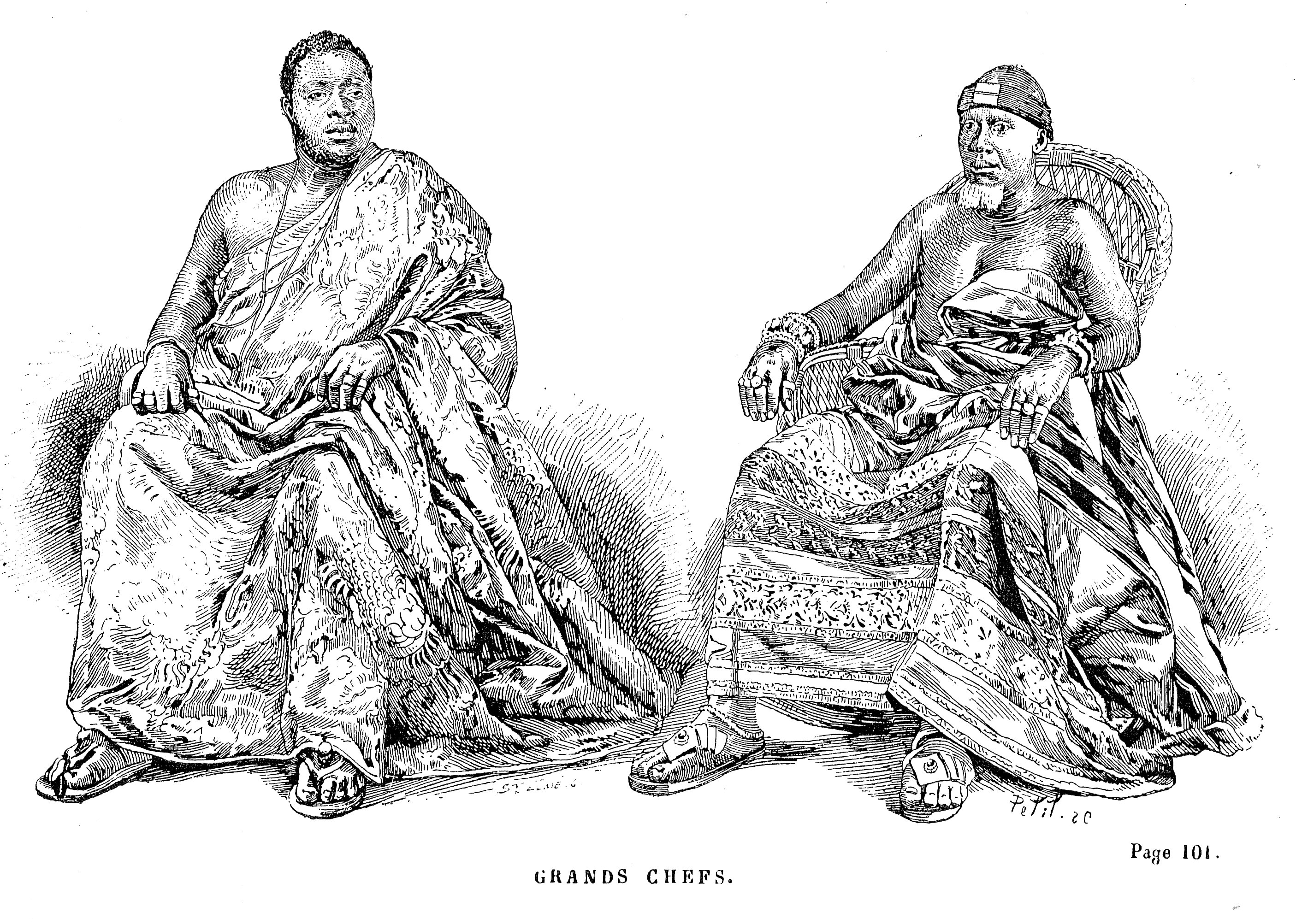
Grand Chiefs of the Ashanti Empire, c. 1873, Visual Art by Jules Gros.

The Ashanti Empire was created from a confederacy of several chiefdoms and united as a single state under the Golden stool. The Asantehene was the highest form of authority in the empire where most of Ashanti's power centered upon. He did not enjoy absolute rule. If the Asantehene violated the oaths he took during his enstoolment, he could be impeached. The Asanteman Council served as the advisory body to the king. Every Metropolitan Ashanti state was headed by an Amanhene or paramount chief who served as the principal rulers of each state. The Ohene was in charge of the state divisions whiles the odikro exercised jurisdiction over all villages in Ashanti. The Kotoko Council was the legislative body of the empire.

==== Mole-Dagbani ====
In Mole-Dagbani, every state had its own autonomous government that was headed by a supreme ruler. For example, the supreme ruler of the Mamprusi was known as the Nayiri whilst that of the Gonja was the Yagbumwura. A council of elders existed to assist the supreme ruler in his administration of the state. Below the supreme ruler and Council of elders were the divisional chiefs who were responsible for the various divisions in the state.

=== Non-Centralized states ===
Ethnic groups such as Vagala, Sisala, Guan and Talensi in Northern Ghana were acephalous states with no organized political system. They lacked a central government to make and enforce laws. An individual landlord executed authority over all lands. Among the Talensi for example, such landlords were referred to as the Tendaana. Each Talensi family lineage was headed by an elder known as the Kpe'em who was socially and spiritually responsible for the conduct of the members of his lineage.

=== Theocracies ===
Theocratic groups included the Ga-Adangbe, and the Guan where power rested in the hands of a priestly class. The Ga-Adangbe lacked a central authority since each Ga settlement was autonomous. The Wulomei or fetish priest represented the Ga priestly class. In time, the Ga city states separated political power from religious authority. The position of state chief, known as Gã Mantse became responsible for civil matters while religious authority remained in the hands of the Wulomei, yet still, the Wulomei had great influence in the administration of the state.

According to Reindorf, the Guan people were not governed by any "principal man" but every town had its own ruler. The fetish priest wielded both political and religious functions. Due to the influence of Akan Chieftaincy institutions, each Guan state later adopted a chief and the office of a priest was separated from that of a chief. The clan heads of each state formed a council of elders that assisted the chiefs in decision-making.

== Colonial era ==
=== Dutch Gold Coast ===
The Dutch West India Company was responsible for Dutch colonial possessions in the Gold Coast. The company was headed by a Director-general who was assisted by a council of senior colonial officers. The structure of the Dutch Gold Coast government was restructured in 1675. The area under the authority of the Director-General was redefined as "the Coast of Africa, from Sierra Leone all exclusively to 30 degrees South of the equator, together with all the islands in between," thereby nominally reinstating the claim on the territories lost in this area to the Portuguese.

=== British Gold Coast ===
The British Gold Coast was made up of Southern Ghana, the Ashanti Crown Colony, the Northern Territories of the Gold Coast Protectorate and the Trust Territory of Togoland. Southern Ghana was administered differently from Ashanti, the Northern Territories and British Togo land. The Ashanti, Northern Territories and British Togoland were ruled directly by the Governor who was assisted by Chief commissioners, commissioners and District commissioners. On the other hand, Southern Ghana was ruled by an Executive and Legislative Council which aided the governor in administering the state.

Indirect rule was introduced into the Gold Coast by Governor Gordon Guggisberg. The system of indirect rule was first implemented in West Africa by Frederick Lugard in Northern Nigeria from 1901, after he became Governor. He then recommended its application in other British colonies in Africa. Indirect rule led to the division of the Gold Coast into provinces under the administration and jurisdiction of Provincial Commissioners. Each province was sub-divided into a member of administrative units which was headed by District Commissioners. Each district was made up of traditional areas that fell under the control of a paramount chief or king. These kings, chiefs and sub-chiefs were responsible for presiding over native courts, maintaining law and order as well as satisfying access to basic amenities such as clinics and schools. The native authorities functioned under the general direction and control of the British District Commissioners. There was a growth of nationalism among native Ghanaians in the 1940s, resulting in the call for more autonomy in 1948. The Coussey Committee was formed in response to the riots of Acrra in 1948, in order to draft a new constitution that will satisfy the demands of the natives. A new constitution was formed in 1951 which conferred on the country a self-governing status. The United Gold Coast Convention (UGCC) was the first native political party in the Gold Coast. General elections were held in 1951. The election was the first in Africa to be held under universal suffrage. As a result, Kwame Nkrumah, who represented the Convention People's Party (CPP) was elected as the first Prime Minister of Ghana in 1952. There was also the approval of a new constitution on 29 April 1954. The new constitution meant that assembly members were no longer elected by the ethnic councils, the assembly was enlarged, and all members were elected directly from single-member constituencies with equal representation. It established a cabinet of African ministers, with only defense and foreign policy remaining in the hands of the governor; the elected assembly was given control over the majority of internal affairs. In order to reflect the provisions of the new constitution, a nationwide election was held in 1954 which was won by the CPP, a political party founded by Kwame Nkrumah. The 1954 General election gave the country its first All-African assembly.

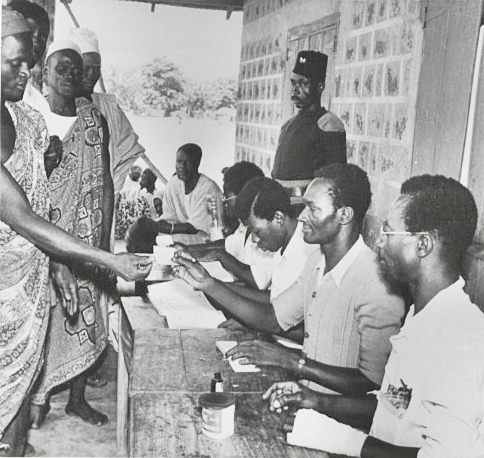
A voter receives a ballot paper from a polling assistant at the Kumbungu Polling Station in the Northern Territories, during the 1956 general elections.

Elections were organised in July 1956 by the British government which saw the CPP win by a landslide. On 3 August 1956, Kwame Nkrumah passed a proposal in Parliament, calling for the independence of the Gold Coast of which the British accepted. The United Nations organized a plebiscite on 9 May 1956 to decide whether the Trust Territory of Togoland would join Ghana at Independence. Majority of the people in the Trust Territory of Togoland voted in the plebiscite for unification with Ghana. Ghana gained independence in 1957 and the first presidential elections took place in 1960. Kwame Nkrumah emerged as the first president of sovereign Ghana.

== Independence ==
=== First Republic ===
Between 1957 and 1960, Charles Arden-Clarke who was governor of the Gold Coast before its independence, became Governor-General and ceremonial head of state. He represented the British Monarch. Kwame Nkrumah remained Prime Minister and Head of government. In 1960, Kwame Nkrumah became president of the sovereign Gold Coast now called Ghana. The Republican constitution set up by the Nkrumah government that year further strengthened the position of president Nkrumah as the Executive president. The president was empowered to appoint and dismiss the Chief Justice. Under Article 24, the president was empowered to give assent to every bill passed by Parliament either wholly or in part, as well as reject the bill. Following a constitutional referendum on 31 January 1964, Ghana became a One-party state in 1964, with the CPP recognized as the only political party in the country. On 24 February 1966, the Nkrumah government was toppled in a military coup executed by Colonel Emmanuel Kwasi Kotoka and Major Akwasi Afrifa They proclaimed the establishment of the National Liberation Council (NLC) which became the subsequent government of the country.

=== Second Republic ===
The National Liberation Council established many commissions and advisory committees to make policies and engage with civil society. Various committees were assigned to areas such as the economy, public relations, foreign relations, law, farming, and the structure of government itself (which did indeed undergo frequent reorganization). Regional and local commissioners were replaced by "management committees"; administrative districts were consolidated from 168 to 47. The management committees were constituted mostly by civil servants as well as one private citizen nominated by the police. Many personnel from the old councils participated in the new committees.

The NLC certified its plans to transfer power to civilian rule. It lifted the ban on political activities in Ghana in May 1969. A date was fixed for general elections in order to hand over to civilian rule on 1 October 1969. Five political parties participated in the August 29 elections. Of these, the largest were the Progress Party, led by K.A. Busia, and the National Alliance of Liberals, led by K. A. Gbedemah. Busia and the Progress Party won the sizeable majority of seats: 105 of 140. A new constitution, passed on 15 August 1969, provided for a judiciary, a unicameral legislature, a prime minister, and a president. It introduced a parliamentary system of government similar to that of the United Kingdom. The constitution held the view that the traditional separations of power are outdated and it is the job of the President to preserve the independence of institutions. The Second Republic Constitution used a decentralized form of government, where the local administrations served as extensions to the central government, which set the local administration's prerogative. The Second Republic began on 1 October 1969 with K. A Busia as the Prime Minister and Edward Akufo-Addo as president and ceremonial head of state.

=== Third Republic ===
The Busia administration and Second Republic of Ghana came to an end in 1972, when the National Redemption Council enabled a Coup D'etat and became the new government on 13 January 1972. Several military juntas took hold of administering the state between 1972 and 1979. They included the Supreme Military Council and Armed Forces Revolutionary Council. The Armed Revolutionary Council led by John Jerry Rawlings rose to power in 1979 following an uprising on June 4th. The Council initiated a transition process of handing over power to a civilian government. General elections were slated for 1979. Flagbearer of the People's National Party (Ghana) (PNP), Hilla Limann became president after winning the general election. The PNP government of Hilla Liman marked the inauguration of the Third Republic on 24 September 1979.

== Recent history ==
=== Fourth Republic ===
On 31 September 1981, the Provisional National Defence Council, (PNDC) led by John Jerry Rawlings toppled the 3rd Republic in a Coup that saw the military government rule Ghana from December 1981 till 7 January 1993.

The PNDC provided a new constitution in 1992 and held elections that year. Rawlings's party, the NDC, won the presidential election with 58% of the vote. The opposition boycotted the subsequent parliamentary elections. The new constitution was designed to decentralize the government in Ghana. John Kufuor succeeded Jerry Rawlings as the second president of the 4th Republic after winning majority votes at the 2000 Ghanaian general election. This was the first peaceful transition of power in the 4th Republic.

Kufuor won another term again in the presidential election in 2004. The presidency of Kufuor saw several social reforms, such as the reform in the system of National Health Insurance of Ghana in 2003. In 2005 saw the start of the Ghana School Feeding Programme, in which a free hot meal per day was provided in public schools and kindergartens in the poorest areas. Although some projects were criticised as unfinished or unfunded, the progress of Ghana was noted internationally. President Kufuor soon gave up power in 2008. The ruling New Patriotic Party chose Nana Akufo-Addo, son of Edward Akufo-Addo, as their candidate while National Democratic Congress's John Atta Mills stood for the third time. After a run-off, John Atta Mills won the election. On 24 July 2012, Ghana suffered a shocking blow when their president died. Power was then given to his vice-president, John Dramani Mahama. He chose the then Governor of the Bank of Ghana, Kwesi Amissah-Arthur, as his vice. The National Democratic Congress won the 2012 election, making John Mahama rule again, his first term.

John Atta Mills was sworn in as president on 7 January 2009 in a peaceful transition after Nana Akuffo Addo was narrowly defeated. Mills died of natural causes and was succeeded by vice-president John Dramani Mahama on 24 July 2012.

Following the Ghanaian presidential election, 2012, John Dramani Mahama became President-elect and was inaugurated on 7 January 2013. Ghana was a stable democracy.

As a result of the Ghanaian presidential election, 2016, Nana Akufo-Addo became President-elect and was inaugurated as the fifth President of the Fourth Republic of Ghana and eighth President of Ghana on 7 January 2017. In December 2020, President Nana Akufo-Addo was re-elected after a tightly contested election.
