= Year of Africa =

1960, year of the independence of 17 African countries

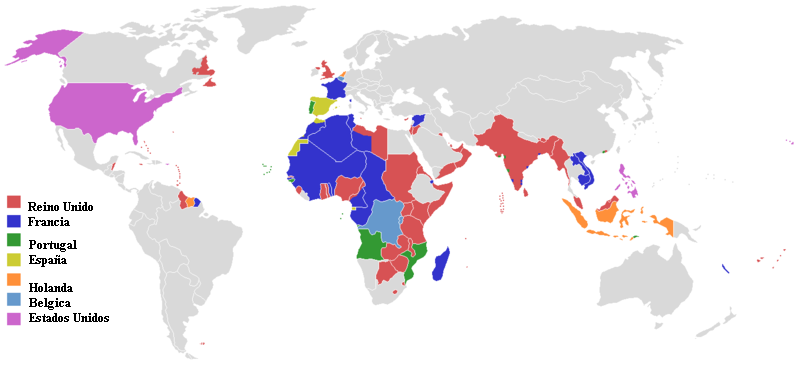
Colonial powers in 1945

The Year of Africa refers to a series of events that took place during the year 1960—mainly the independence of seventeen African nations—that highlighted the growing pan-African sentiments in the continent. The year brought about the culmination of African independence movements and the subsequent emergence of Africa as a major force in the United Nations. These rapid political developments led to speculation and hope about the future of Africa as a whole; yet at the same time, the continent was beginning to face the realities of post-colonial violence. This year also saw the beginning of armed opposition to South African apartheid government, with political ramifications across Africa and around the world. During the year, 17 colonies became independent, including 14 colonies from the French colonial empire, 2 from the British Empire and 1 from Belgium.

== Origin ==
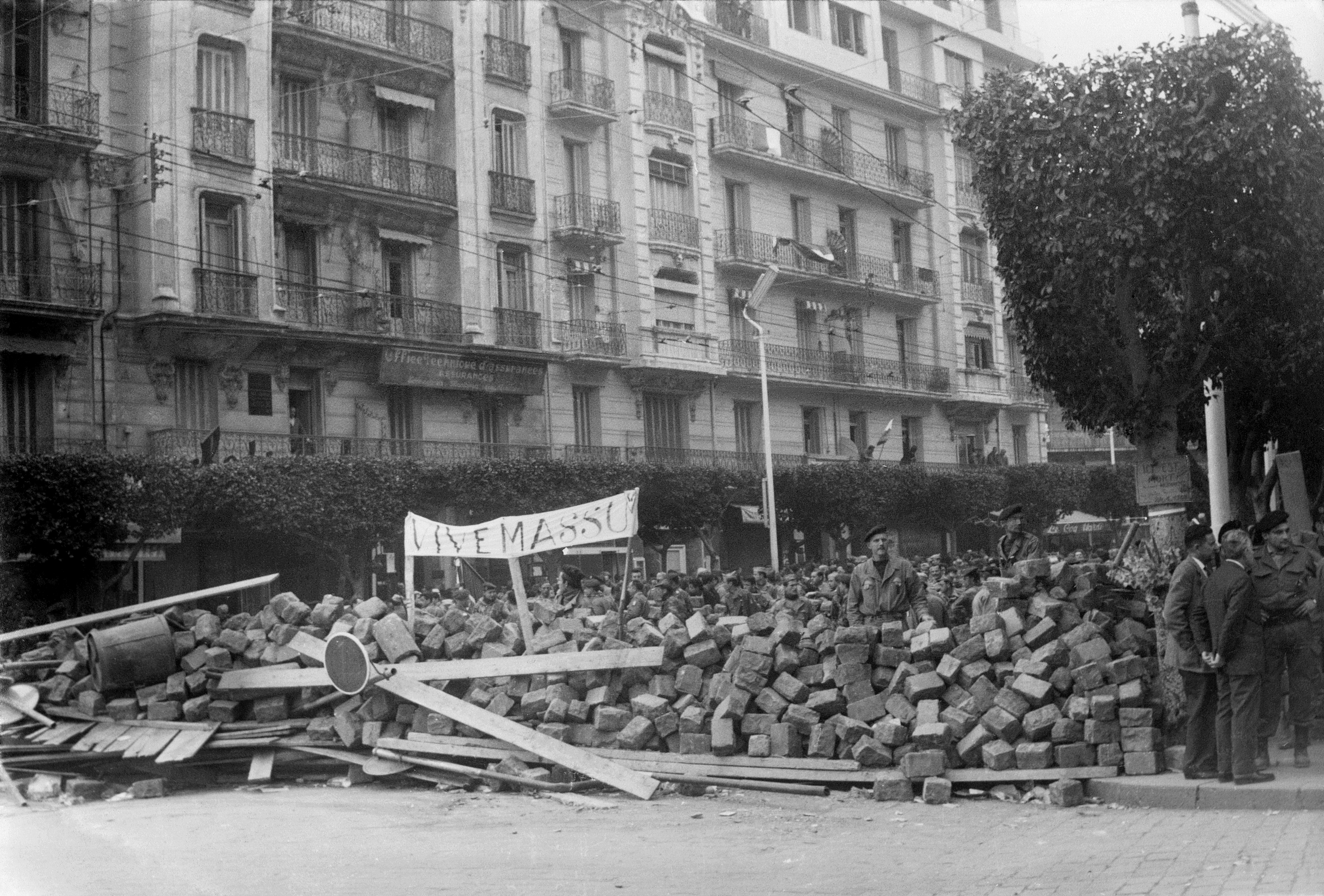
Week of the Barricades, January 1960 in Algiers

O. H. Morris of the British Ministry of Colonies predicted in early January that "1960 will be a year of Africa". The phrase "year of Africa" was also used by Ralph Bunche on 16 February 1960. Bunche anticipated that many states would achieve independence in that year due to the "well nigh explosive rapidity with which the peoples of Africa in all sectors are emerging from colonialism." The concept of a "Year of Africa" drew international media attention.

The mythology of the year was also influenced by the "Wind of Change" speech, delivered on 3 February 1960 by Harold Macmillan. Speaking in Cape Town, Macmillan acknowledged that imperial powers would have difficulty continuing to control their colonies. The speech represented an admission by Britain's political elite that the British Empire was over and could not be maintained. This inspired a reaction from the Empire Loyalist wing of the Conservative Party; see Conservative Monday Club. Africans also reacted. In the words of Guinean Foreign Minister Caba Sory:

The 'wind of change' which has been referred to recently by Prime Minister Macmillan, threatens to soon become a hurricane... Guns and bayonets can no longer prevail in the face of the strong conscience of the populations of Africa which are determined to put an end to colonialism.

== Independence ==
During 1960, the number of independent countries rose from nine (with populations of 95 million) to twenty-six (with populations of 180 million), with 17 colonies gaining their independence, including 14 colonies from the French colonial empire, 2 from the British Empire and 1 from Belgium.

=== From France ===
In response to mounting conflict in Algeria—particularly the May 1958 crisis—France created a new constitution in 1958. This constitution made colonial states part of the "French Community" (La Communauté) which restructured the French empire as a sort of federation. All member states acceded to the agreement except for Guinea, which obtained independence in 1958 when it refused to join La Communauté. Its decision led France to cut off all support but set a precedent for other French colonies. In December 1959, returning French leader Charles De Gaulle agreed that member states could have independence if they chose. All did, at a rate much faster than France anticipated.

- Cameroon (formerly Cameroun) achieved independence on the first day of 1960 (unifying with part of the British Cameroons in 1961).
- Togo (formerly French Togoland) achieved independence on 27 April
- Mali Federation became independent on 20 June, then split into Mali and Senegal on 20 August
- Madagascar became independent on 26 June
- Dahomey (renamed to Benin in 1975) became independent on 1 August
- Niger, independent on 3 August
- Upper Volta (renamed to Burkina Faso in 1984), independent on 5 August
- Ivory Coast (Côte d'Ivoire), independent on 7 August
- Chad, independent on 11 August
- Central African Republic, independent on 13 August
- Republic of the Congo (Brazzaville), independent on 15 August
- Gabon, independent on 17 August
- Mauritania, independent on 28 November

These countries remained within the French sphere of influence, particularly in economic terms. France also brokered political agreements with the Mali Federation and Madagascar, waiving the mandate that departure from the French Community would lead to the end of political ties (as it had for Guinea). French companies thus accepted the arrangement, because they would remain well-positioned to profit from the newly independent countries—which also continued to use colonial (CFA) francs.

The new constitutions created by these countries use some ideas from the French Constitution, including values of democracy and universal rights as well as a parliamentary system with a strong executive. They also sometimes use language from the UN's Universal Declaration of Human Rights. They all emphasize Pan-Africanism over nationalism.

=== From Italy and the United Kingdom ===
Two countries achieved independence from the British Empire in 1960: Somalia, through the unification of British Somaliland and the Trust Territory of Somalia, and Nigeria.

On 26 June (also the day of Madagascar's independence), British Somaliland became the independent State of Somaliland. Five days later, it united with the Italian Trust Territory of Somalia to create the Somali Republic on 1 July.

Nigeria had the largest population and best economy on the continent. It became independent on 1 October.

Also in 1960, the Dominion of Ghana voted to become a Republic, thereby ending Queen Elizabeth II's reign 1957–1960, as the Queen of Ghana. World-famous Pan-Africanist Kwame Nkrumah, formerly the Prime Minister, was simultaneously elected President, on 27 April 1960.

=== From Belgium ===
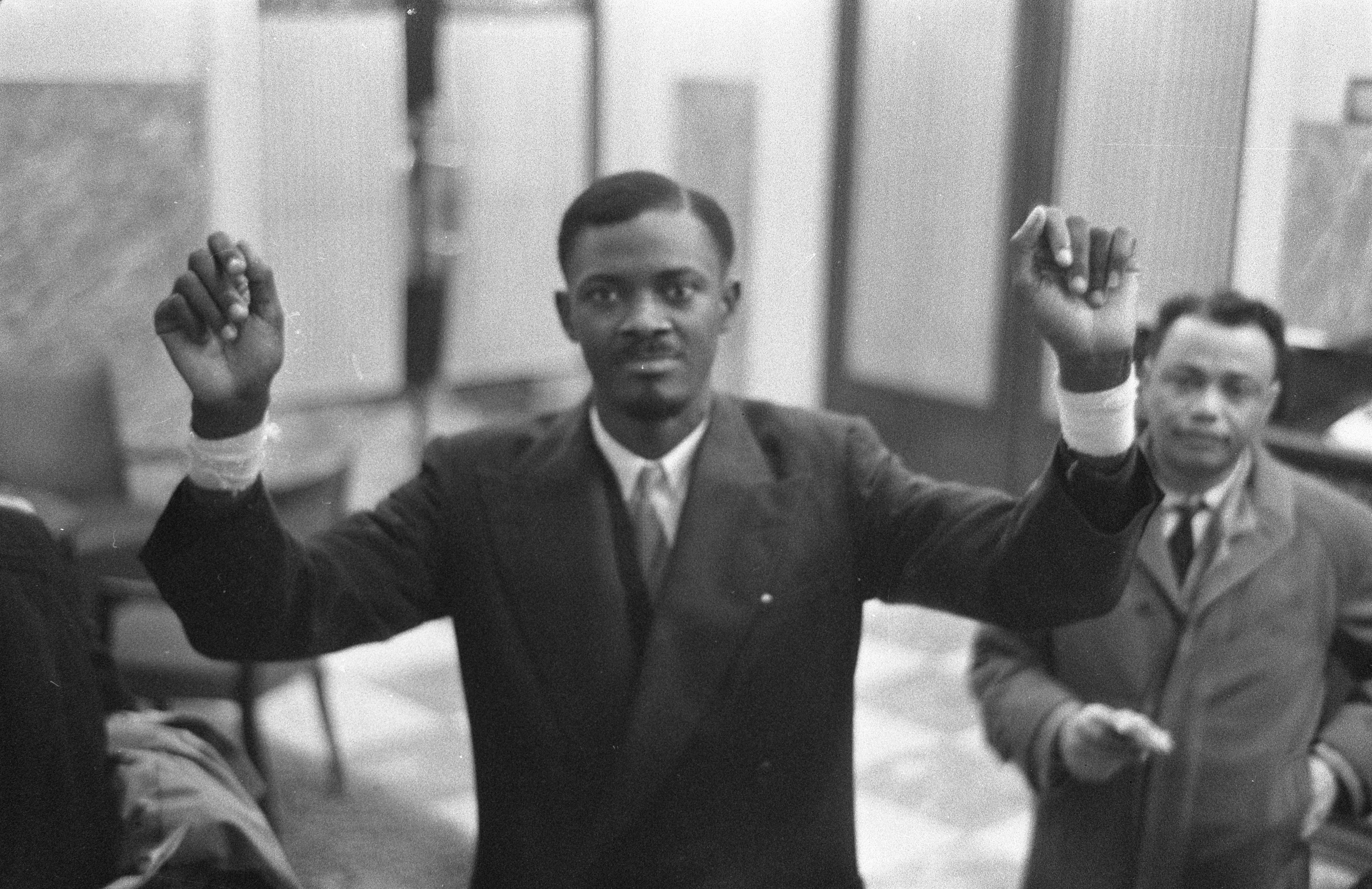
Lumumba in Brussels, January 1960

The Congolese had been agitating heavily for independence, and at the beginning of 1960 Patrice Lumumba was imprisoned for inciting a riot in 1959. Recognizing that the Congo was going to become independent, Belgium freed Lumumba and allowed him to attend a conference in Brussels from 18 to 27 January. At the conference, 30 June was established as independence day for the Republic of the Congo. Lumumba won a large plurality in the May elections and became Prime Minister of the country on 30 June. The spirit of the occasion inspired the celebrated Congolese musician Le Grand Kallé to write the song "Indépendance Cha Cha", which became a pan-African hit.

The country was soon embroiled in turmoil, and Lumumba was deposed on 14 September. He was subsequently tortured and executed. The subsequent period of instability is sometimes called the Congo Crisis.

The events in the Congo led the London Daily Express—which had consistently favoured colonialism—to denounce the "Year of Africa" and call for 1961 to be a "year of realism".

== South Africa ==
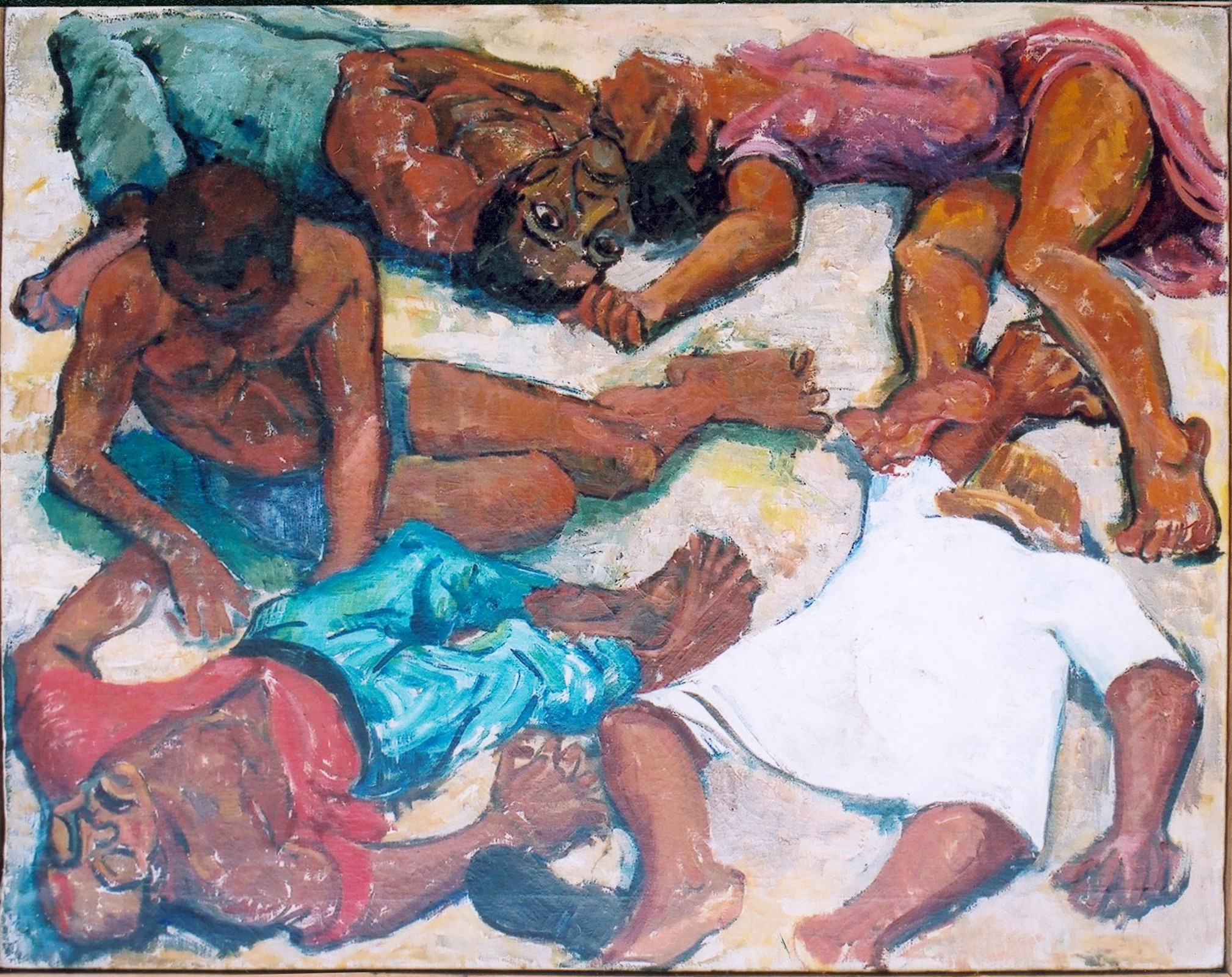
"Murder at Sharpeville", Godfrey Rubens—the Sharpeville Massacre brought worldwide attention to apartheid

The Sharpeville massacre in South Africa took place on 21 March 1960, triggering mass underground resistance as well as international solidarity demonstrations. This event is sometimes cited as the beginning of worldwide struggle against apartheid. South African activists and academics describe it as a turning point in the resistance, marking the end of nonviolence and liberalism. Some say that its biggest impact came in making white South Africans aware of the brutality with which political blacks were being suppressed.

On 5 October, a referendum was passed in South Africa which abolished the monarchy, which set up South Africa's leaving the Commonwealth of Nations the next year over its racial policies.

== United Nations ==
In October, Ghanaian president Kwame Nkrumah delivered an address to the United Nations, in which he discussed Africa's role in the world and the future role of the world in Africa. Nkrumah asserted Africa's new power, opining that it did not wish revenge on the European nations which colonized the continent, but would insist on freedom nonetheless:

One cardinal fact of our time is the momentous impact of Africa's awakening upon the modern world. The flowing tide of African nationalism sweeps everything before it and constitutes a challenge to the colonial powers to make a just restitution for the years of injustice and crime committed against our continent.
But Africa does not seek vengeance. It is against her very nature to harbor malice. Over two million of our people cry out with one voice of tremendous power. And what do they say? We do not ask for death for our oppressors; we do not pronounce wishes of ill-fate for our slave-masters; we make an assertion of a just and positive demand; our voice booms across the oceans and mountains, over the hills and valleys, in the desert places and through the vast expanse of mankind's inhabitations, and it calls out for the freedom of Africa. Africa wants her freedom. Africa must be free. It is a simple call, but it's also a signal lighting a red warning to those who would tend to ignore it.

Nkrumah called for an end to white supremacy, particularly in South Africa. In an introduction the printed text of the speech, W.E.B. Du Bois writes: "...there can be no doubt that Kwame Nkrumah is the Voice of Africa. That is, that more nearly than any other living man he expresses the thought and ideals of the dark continent and that this continent is stepping to the forefront in world affairs."

On 14 December 1960, the UN General Assembly approved the Declaration on the Granting of Independence to Colonial Countries and Peoples. This statement affirms that "all peoples have the right to self-determination", and that rule by outside powers constitutes a violation of human rights. The statement passed with no votes against. The United States and seven other colonial powers abstained; Zelma George, an African American in the U.S. delegation, stood to signify her support of the Declaration.

== Related events ==
The Second All-African Peoples' Conference, held from 25 to 31 January, called for Africa's complete independence and the establishment of an African bank.

In the 1960 Summer Olympics in Rome, Ethiopian runner Abebe Bikila won the marathon and became the first Black African to receive an Olympic gold medal. His achievement intensified African pride and global focus on the continent.

== Implications and legacy ==
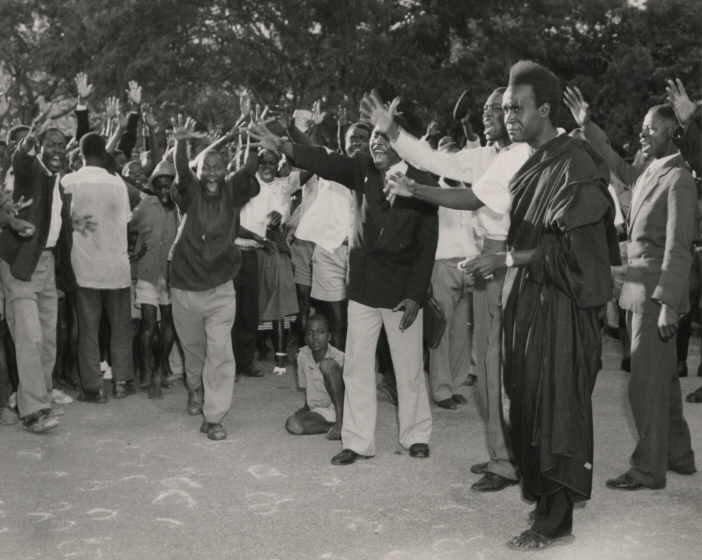
Pro-independence rally in Northern Rhodesia (later Zambia), March 1960

The Year of Africa altered the symbolic status of Africans worldwide, by having the world recognize the existence of African nations as a force to be reckoned with on the international arena. It marked the beginning of a new, more Afrocentric era in African studies, marked by the founding of the Cahiers d'Études africaines and the Journal of African History.

The Year of Africa was a major boost for African Americans, themselves engaged in the Civil Rights Movement within the United States. The Baltimore Afro-American, confident that sit-ins would defeat segregation in the Southern United States, editorialized: "The 'winds of change' which are sweeping over Africa, are blowing in the benighted areas of the United States, too." Professor James H. Meriwether, looking back on the Year of Africa, writes: "The events of 1960 strengthened links between African Americans and the worldwide struggle against white supremacy, while doing so on a more Africa-centered basis." More concretely, resisters to segregation in the Southern United States may have begun to look to South Africa for inspiration—and vice versa.

The phrase "Year of Africa" was used again in 2005, mostly in conjunction with Western attention to the continent surrounding the 31st G8 summit.

In 2010, several African nations celebrated 50 years of independence on the "Year of Africa" semicentennial.

== See also ==
- Scramble for Africa
- Indépendance Cha Cha
- Year of return
