= Government of Ghana =

National government of the Republic of Ghana

- Coat of Arms of the Republic of Ghana

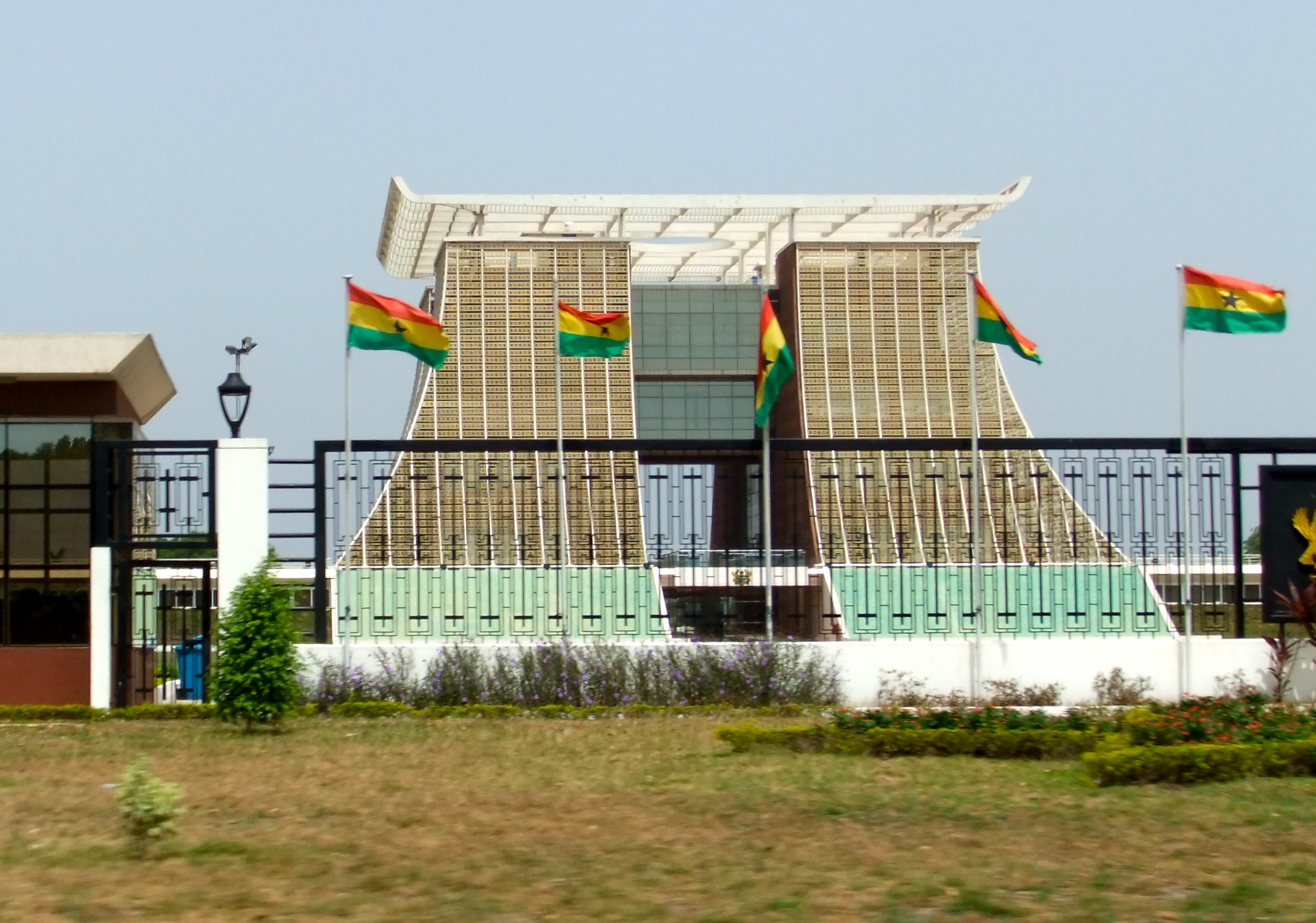
- Jubilee House, the official residence and presidential palace in the country.

Government overview
- Formed: Independence Day; 69 years, 5 months Republic Day; 66 years, 1 month 1992 Constitution; 34 years, 2 months
- Type: Parliamentary democracy with executive presidency
- Jurisdiction: Republic of Ghana
- Headquarters: Accra, Greater Accra (Ghana)
- Government executives: John Dramani Mahama, President of Ghana; Jane Naana Opoku-Agyemang, Vice-President of Ghana; Alban Kingsford Sumana Bagbin, Speaker of Parliament; Justice Paul Baffoe-Bonnie, Chief Justice of Ghana
- Website: www.ghana.gov.gh

The Government of Ghana was created as a parliamentary democracy, followed by alternating military and civilian governments in Ghana. In January 1993, military government gave way to the Fourth Republic after presidential and parliamentary elections in late 1992. The 1992 constitution divides powers among a president, parliament, cabinet, council of state, and an independent judiciary. The government is elected by universal suffrage.

== Government ==
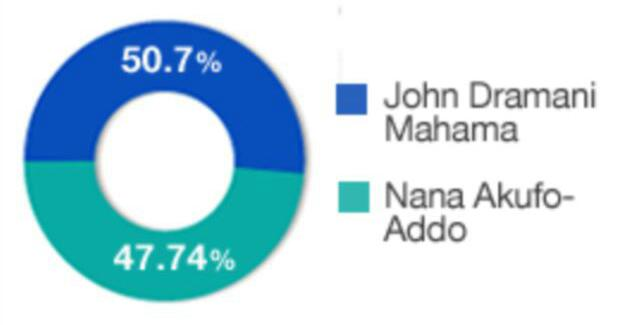
Ghana presidential election, 2012 result according to the Electoral Commission of Ghana. National Democratic Congress New Patriotic Party

Political parties became legal in mid-1992 after a ten-year hiatus. There are more than 20 registered political parties under the Fourth Republic. The two main parties are the National Democratic Congress and the New Patriotic Party. The National Democratic Congress is the successor organisation to Jerry John Rawlings' Provisional National Defence Council which was in power from 1981 to 1992.

The New Patriotic Party, found in 1992, is the successor to the Gold Coast's The Big Six independence achiever party United Gold Coast Convention (UGCC); the People's National Convention, and the Convention People's Party, successor to Kwame Nkrumah's original party of the same name, which was the incumbent government of Ghana for 10 years from declaration of independence in 1957 to 1966, winning elections in 1956, 1960, and 1965.

The National Democratic Congress won the presidential and parliamentary elections in 1992, 1996, 2008 and 2012. The New Patriotic Party won the presidential and parliamentary elections in 2000, 2004, and 2016. In 2020, the NPP won the Presidency, yet tied in the parliamentary elections with the NDC and the single seat that remained was filled by an independent, turning the NPP into the Fourth Republic’s first minority government. The following election in 2024, the National Democratic Congress managed to return to power, winning both the Presidency and parliament handedly, making their candidate, former President John Mahama (2012-2017), the first President to serve a non-consecutive second term.

=== Foreign relations ===
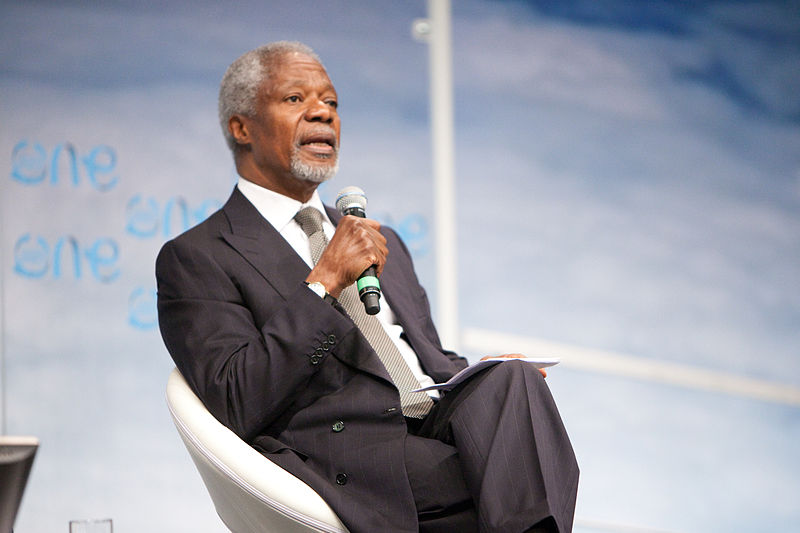
Ghanaian diplomat Kofi Annan served as Secretary-General of the United Nations for nine years until 2006.

Since independence, Ghana has been devoted to ideals of nonalignment and is a founding member of the non-aligned movement. Ghana favors international and regional political and economic co-operation, and is an active member of the United Nations and the African Union.

Some Ghanaian diplomats and politicians hold positions in international organisations. These include Ghanaian diplomat and former Secretary-General of the United Nations Kofi Annan, International Criminal Court Judge Akua Kuenyehia, former President Jerry John Rawlings and former President John Agyekum Kuffour who have both served as diplomats of the United Nations.

In September 2010, Ghana's former President John Atta Mills visited China on an official visit. Mills and China's former President Hu Jintao, marked the 50th anniversary of diplomatic ties between the two nations, at the Great Hall of the People on 20 September 2010. China reciprocated with a visit in November 2011, by the vice-chairman of the Standing Committee of the National People's Congress of China, Zhou Tienong who visited Ghana and met with Ghana's President John Dramani Mahama.

=== Judicial system ===
The legal system is based on the 1992 constitution, customary (traditional) law, and British common law. Court hierarchy consists of Supreme Court of Ghana (highest court), courts of appeal, and high courts of justice. Beneath these bodies are circuit, magisterial, and traditional courts. Extrajudicial institutions include public tribunals. Since independence, courts are somewhat independent; this independence continues under the Republic. Lower courts are being redefined and reorganized under the Republic.

=== Administrative divisions ===
There are sixteen administrative regions of the Republic of Ghana which are divided into 6 metropolitan assemblies; 55 Municipal assemblies; and 216 districts, each with its own district assembly. Below districts are various types of councils, including 58 town or area councils; 108 zonal councils; and 626 area councils. Over 16,000 unit committees exist on the lowest level. Ghana has 275 electoral constituencies.

== See also ==
- Parliament House of Ghana
- President of Ghana
- Heads of states of Ghana
