= 1965 Ghanaian parliamentary election =

- 9 June 1965

All 198 seats in the National Assembly 100 seats needed for a majority
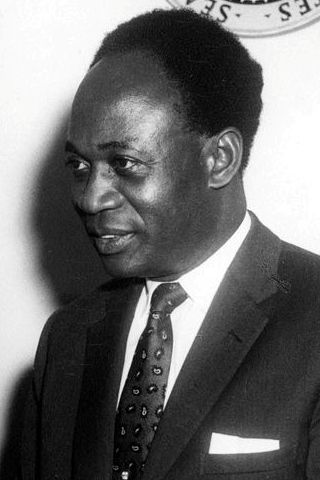
	First party
Leader	Kwame Nkrumah
Party	CPP
Last election	71
Seats won	198

Parliamentary appointments were scheduled to be held in Ghana on 9 June 1965. As the country was a one-party state at the time, no parties except President Kwame Nkrumah's Convention People's Party (CPP), were allowed to participate. The CPP's central committee nominated 198 candidates for the 198 seats in the National Assembly, who were then declared elected without a vote taking place.

== Background ==
Due to a constitutional amendment passed by the CPP majority and a referendum the previous year, the CPP had become the sole legal party. All other parties were banned. It was the first vote for the country's parliament since the pre-independence 1956 legislative elections; Nkrumah's victory in the 1960 constitutional referendum was taken by the President and his party as a fresh mandate from the people and the terms of National Assembly members were extended for another five years.

== Results ==
As Ghana was now a one-party state, all 198 MPs representing the CPP were appointed by the president and elected unopposed.

== Aftermath ==
Nkrumah was overthrown in a coup in February 1966, the CPP was dissolved, and the constitution suspended. The conversion of the country's governance system was one of the major reasons for the 1966 coup. Multi-party politics was restored by the time of the next elections in 1969.

== See also ==
- List of MPs elected in the 1965 Ghanaian parliamentary election
