= Dominion of Ghana =

Ghana from 1957 to 1960

Ghana
- 1957–1960
- Flag Coat of arms
- Motto: "Freedom and Justice"
- Anthem: "God Bless Our Homeland Ghana"
- Capital: Accra
- Official languages: English
- Government: Unitary parliamentary constitutional monarchy
- Monarch
  - 1957–1960: Queen Elizabeth II
- Governor-General
  - 1957: Sir Charles Arden-Clarke
  - 1957–1960: The Earl of Listowel
- Prime Minister
  - 1957–1960: Kwame Nkrumah
- Legislature: National Assembly
- Historical era: Cold War
  - Independence: 6 March 1957
  - Republic: 1 July 1960
- Currency: BWA pound (1957–1958); Ghanaian pound (from 1958)
Preceded by	Succeeded by
British Gold Coast	Republic of Ghana

Ghanaian trade delegation in Amsterdam, 1958

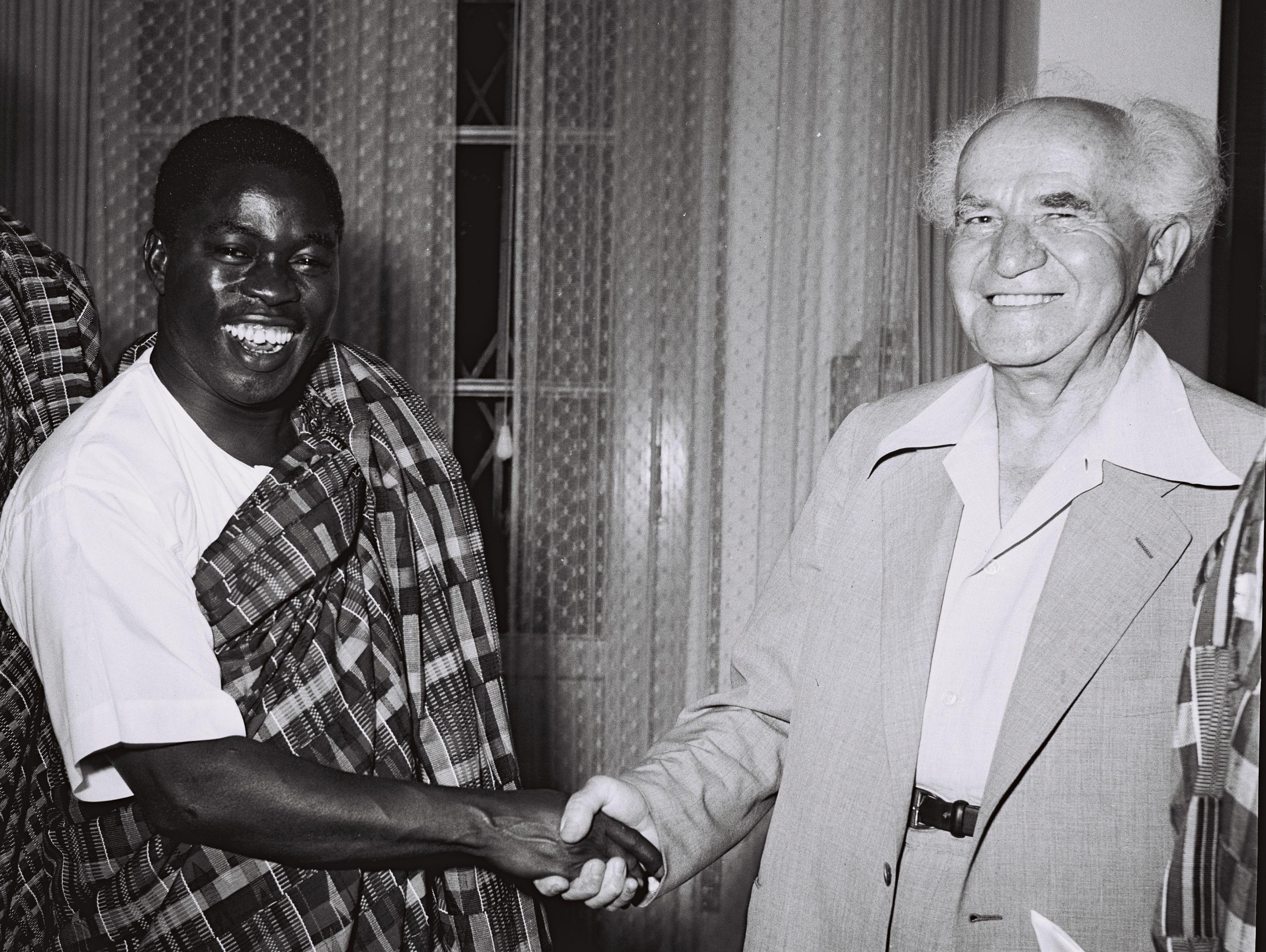
Interior Minister Krobo Edusei with David Ben Gurion, 1959

During the first three years after independence, from 1957 to 1960, Ghana was a Commonwealth realm with a Westminster system of government and Elizabeth II, the British monarch, served as Queen of Ghana. Although the country was sometimes referred to as the Dominion of Ghana during this period, it never held the formal status of Dominion within the British Empire.

The country that became the independent state of Ghana was at the date of independence made up of four separate territories with different statuses in British law: the Gold Coast Colony (founded in 1821); Ashanti (a "protectorate" from 1896 and a "colony" from 1901); British Togoland (a UN Trust Territory, formerly a League of Nations Mandate); and the Northern Territories (a "protectorate").

Within the legal regime established by the British Nationality Act 1948 (entry into force, 1 January 1949), and related legislation, all British colonies were deemed under United Kingdom law to be "within the Crown's dominions". This status continued after independence within the Commonwealth, so long as the new state continued to recognise the same person who was the British monarch as its head of state.

From the date of entry into force of the Ghana Independence Act 1957 on 6 March 1957, the new state of Ghana became what was in British law termed an "independent Commonwealth country". It remained "within the Crown's dominions" until 1 July 1960, when it became the Republic of Ghana and the Queen ceased to be head of state. The Republic of Ghana remained within the Commonwealth, though no longer "within the Crown's dominions".

During the period from 1957 to 1960, Kwame Nkrumah held office as prime minister (and head of government). The monarch's constitutional roles as head of state were mostly delegated to the Governor-General of Ghana. The following governors-general held office:

1. Sir Charles Arden-Clarke (6 March – 24 June 1957)
2. The 5th Earl of Listowel (24 June 1957 – 1 July 1960)

Following the creation of a republic by the 1960 Ghanaian constitutional referendum, Nkrumah won the presidential election and became the first President of Ghana.

Ghana never held the legal status of "Dominion" within the British Empire, a status given to self-governing colonies (given legislative independence by the Statute of Westminster 1931), including Canada, Australia, New Zealand, and the Union of South Africa; as well as India and Pakistan from 15 August 1947, one month after their independence, and Ceylon for a few months of 1948. The status of Dominion ceased to exist in its previous form from 1949, as the former Dominions became "independent Commonwealth countries"; however, the term continued to be used for thirty years, and Nkrumah demanded Dominion status for the Gold Coast in 1951, as one stage in the negotiations for independence.
