= Ghana presidential transition =

Transfer of presidential power after elections

In Ghana, a presidential transition is the process during which the president-elect of Ghana prepares to take over the administration of the Republic of Ghana from the incumbent president. The transition formally starts when the electoral commission of Ghana declares an "apparent winner" of the election thereby releasing the funds appropriated by the parliament of Ghana for the transition, and continues until inauguration day, when the president elect takes the oath of office, at which point the powers, immunities, and responsibilities of the presidency are legally transferred to the new president.

== Presidential transition act ==
The Presidential (Transition) Act, 2012 (Act 845) established arrangements for the political transfer of administration from one democratically elected president to another democratically elected president, to provide for the regulation of the political transfer of power and for related matters.

== Process ==
The transition process begins as leading presidential contenders forming a transition team to start making preliminary plans for building an administration and assuming the presidency should they be elected. This can take place at any time of the candidate's choosing.

According to the Presidential (Transition) Act, 2012 (Act 845), within 24 hours of the declaration of presidential election results, a Transition Team is established. The incumbent president and the President-elect each appoint members to the team, including key officials such as the Head of the Civil Service and the National Security Coordinator. The Transition Team is co-chaired by the incumbent president and the President-elect, with provisions for delegation of responsibilities.

In 2024, the outgoing President, Nana Akufo-Addo called to congratulate the president-elect, John Mahama and the two agreed on an early transition.

== Noteworthy transitions ==
Ghana's presidential transitions have existed in one form or another since 2000 when the outgoing president Jerry John Rawlings passed the presidency to John Agyekum Kufuor, winner of the 2000 Ghanaian general election.

=== JJ Rawlings - John Agyekum Kufuor ===
President Jerry John Rawlings congratulated John Agyekum Kufuor on winning the election and promised to co-operate to ensure peaceful transition.

== See also ==
- Chief of Staff (Ghana)
- List of Ghanaian heads of state by age
