= Afrifa =

Afrifa is an Akan surname, and may refer to:

- Akwasi Afrifa (1936–1979), Akan-Ghanaian brigadier, soldier, farmer, king, politician
- Christine Afrifa, First Lady of Ghana
- Elvis Afrifa (born 1997), Dutch sprinter
- Stephen Afrifa (born 2001), Canadian soccer player
- Akwasi Owusu Afrifa-Mensa (born 1971), Ghanaian politician
