= List of Ghanaian heads of state by age =

This is a list of heads of state of Ghana by age.

== Overview ==
The youngest person to become head of state was Jerry Rawlings, who at the age of 31, assumed office following a coup d'état in 1979. The youngest civilian head of state to assume the presidency was Hilla Limann, who was inaugurated at the age of 44. The oldest person to assume the presidency is Nana Akufo-Addo who was inaugurated at age 72.

At age 34, Akwasi Afrifa was the youngest head of state at the end of his tenure. Fred Akuffo's lifespan of 42 years was the shortest of any head of state. The oldest head of state at the end of his tenure is also Nana Akufo-Addo at 80.

Fred Akuffo's retirement of just 22 days is the shortest in Ghana's history while Joseph Arthur Ankrah's retirement of 23 years is the longest in Ghana's history. At age 87, John Kufuor is the oldest of the three living heads of state, he is also the nation's longest-lived head of state. Kufuor and Nana Akufo-Addo are the only heads of state to have lived into their 80s. The youngest living head of state is John Mahama, age 67.

== List of heads of state by age at assuming office ==
This is a list of heads of state of Ghana by age at assuming office from the youngest to the oldest.

Name	Date of birth	Date of death	Date and age at assuming office
Jerry Rawlings	22 June 1947	12 November 2020	4 June 1979 (aged 31)
Akwasi Afrifa	24 April 1936	26 June 1979	2 April 1969 (aged 32)
Jerry Rawlings	22 June 1947	12 November 2020	31 December 1981 (aged 34)
Ignatius Kutu Acheampong	23 April 1931	16 June 1979	13 January 1972 (aged 40)
Fred Akuffo	21 March 1937	26 June 1979	5 July 1978 (aged 41)
Hilla Limann	12 December 1934	23 January 1998	24 September 1979 (aged 44)
Joseph Arthur Ankrah	18 August 1915	25 November 1992	24 February 1966 (aged 50)
Kwame Nkrumah	21 September 1909	27 April 1972	1 July 1960 (aged 50)
John Mahama	29 November 1958	(living)	24 July 2012 (aged 53)
John Kufuor	8 December 1938	(living)	7 January 2001 (aged 62)
Edward Akufo-Addo	26 June 1906	17 July 1979	31 August 1970 (aged 64)
John Atta Mills	21 July 1944	24 July 2012	7 January 2009 (aged 64)
John Mahama	29 November 1958	(living)	7 January 2025 (aged 66)
Nana Akufo-Addo	29 March 1944	(living)	7 January 2017 (aged 72)

== List of heads of state by longevity ==
This table shows heads of state by their longevity (living heads of state in gold).

Rank	Head of state	Date of birth	Date of death	Longevity (Years, Days)	Longevity (Days)
1	John Kufuor	8 December 1938	Living	87 years, 315 days	32,092 days
2	Nana Akufo-Addo	29 March 1944	Living	82 years, 204 days	30,154 days
3	Joseph Arthur Ankrah	18 August 1915	25 November 1992	77 years, 99 days	28,224 days
4	Jerry Rawlings	22 June 1947	12 November 2020	73 years, 143 days	26,807 days
5	Edward Akufo-Addo	26 June 1906	17 July 1979	73 years, 21 days	26,684 days
6	John Atta Mills	21 July 1944	24 July 2012	68 years, 3 days	24,840 days
7	John Mahama	29 November 1958	Living	67 years, 324 days	24,796 days
8	Hilla Limann	12 December 1934	23 January 1998	63 years, 42 days	23,053 days
9	Kwame Nkrumah	21 September 1909	27 April 1972	62 years, 219 days	22,864 days
10	Ignatius Kutu Acheampong	23 April 1931	16 June 1979	48 years, 54 days	17,586 days
11	Akwasi Afrifa	24 April 1936	26 June 1979	43 years, 63 days	15,768 days
12	Fred Akuffo	21 March 1937	26 June 1979	42 years, 97 days	15,437 days

List of heads of state of Ghana	12
Living	3
Deceased	9

== Ghanaian heads of state's ages ==
This table charts the age of each head of state of Ghana at the time of assuming office, upon leaving office, and at the time of death. Where the head of state is still living, their lifespan and post head of state timespan are calculated up to 19 October 2026.

#	Head of state	Date of birth	Date of assuming office	Age at assuming office	End of term	Age at end of term	Length of retirement	Date of death	Lifespan
1	Kwame Nkrumah	21 September 1909	1 July 1960	50 years, 284 days	24 February 1966	56 years, 156 days	6 years, 63 days	27 April 1972	22,864 days (62 years, 219 days)
2	Joseph Arthur Ankrah	18 August 1915	24 February 1966	50 years, 190 days	2 April 1969	53 years, 227 days	23 years, 237 days	25 November 1992	28,224 days (77 years, 99 days)
3	Akwasi Afrifa	24 April 1936	2 April 1969	32 years, 343 days	7 August 1970	34 years, 105 days	8 years, 323 days	26 June 1979	15,768 days (43 years, 63 days)
4	Edward Akufo-Addo	26 June 1906	31 August 1970	64 years, 66 days	13 January 1972	65 years, 201 days	7 years, 185 days	17 July 1979	26,684 days (73 years, 21 days)
5	Ignatius Kutu Acheampong	23 April 1931	13 January 1972	40 years, 265 days	5 July 1978	47 years, 73 days	346 days	16 June 1979	17,586 days (48 years, 54 days)
6	Fred Akuffo	21 March 1937	5 July 1978	41 years, 106 days	4 June 1979	42 years, 75 days	22 days	26 June 1979	15,437 days (42 years, 97 days)
7	Jerry Rawlings	22 June 1947	4 June 1979	31 years, 347 days	24 September 1979	32 years, 94 days	2 years, 98 days (Note: Rawlings was head of state for two non-consecutive periods; this is his first post-head of state retirement, between the end of his first military tenure in 1979 and the beginning of his second in 1981.)	12 November 2020	26,807 days (73 years, 143 days)
8	Hilla Limann	12 December 1934	24 September 1979	44 years, 286 days	31 December 1981	47 years, 19 days	16 years, 23 days	23 January 1998	23,053 days (63 years, 42 days)
9	Jerry Rawlings	22 June 1947	31 December 1981	34 years, 192 days	7 January 2001	53 years, 199 days	19 years, 310 days (Note: Rawlings was head of state for two non-consecutive periods; this is his post-presidential retirement, after his second period in office (1981–2001).)	12 November 2020	26,807 days (73 years, 143 days)
10	John Kufuor	8 December 1938	7 January 2001	62 years, 30 days	7 January 2009	70 years, 30 days	17 years, 285 days	(living)	32,092 days (87 years, 315 days)
11	John Atta Mills	21 July 1944	7 January 2009	64 years, 170 days	24 July 2012	68 years, 3 days	0 days (Note: Died in office)	24 July 2012	24,840 days (68 years, 3 days)
12	John Mahama	29 November 1958	24 July 2012	53 years, 238 days	7 January 2017	58 years, 39 days	8 years, 0 days (Note: Mahama was president for two non-consecutive periods; this is his first post-presidential retirement, between the end of his first full-term in 2017 and the beginning of his second in 2025.)	(living)	24,796 days (67 years, 324 days)
13	Nana Akufo-Addo	29 March 1944	7 January 2017	72 years, 284 days	7 January 2025	80 years, 284 days	1 year, 285 days	(living)	30,154 days (82 years, 204 days)
14	John Mahama	29 November 1958	7 January 2025	66 years, 39 days	(incumbent)	(incumbent)	(incumbent)	(living)	24,796 days (67 years, 324 days)
#	Head of state	Date of birth	Date of assuming office	Age at assuming office	End of term	Age at end of term	Length of retirement	Date of death	Lifespan
