= Christine Afrifa =

Former First Lady of Ghana; wife of Akwasi Afrifa

- Born: Christine Sussana Addaquay; Gold Coast
- Known for: First Lady of Ghana
- Spouse: Akwasi Afrifa
- Mother: Mrs. Henrietta Araba Mensima Addaquay

Christine Afrifa (née Christine Sussana Addaquay) was a First Lady of Ghana and wife of Akwasi Afrifa. She worked in this office from April 1969, when her husband assumed office as head of state of Ghana, to September 1969, when civilian rule was ushered in and Kofi Abrefa Busia took over as Prime Minister of Ghana. She married Akwasi Afrifa in 1968. Following her husband's death in 1979, she moved to the United Kingdom. A road in Accra is named in her honour. During the National Reconciliation Commission (NRC), she appeared and requested to know who authorised the execution of her husband in 1979. She also appealed to the commission to de-confiscate her husband's assets as well as a prompt action on the Greenstreet Report that recommended benefits for Ex-Presidents and Heads of State.
