= Queen of Ghana =

Elizabeth II's reign in Ghana from 1957 to 1960

- Coat of arms of Ghana

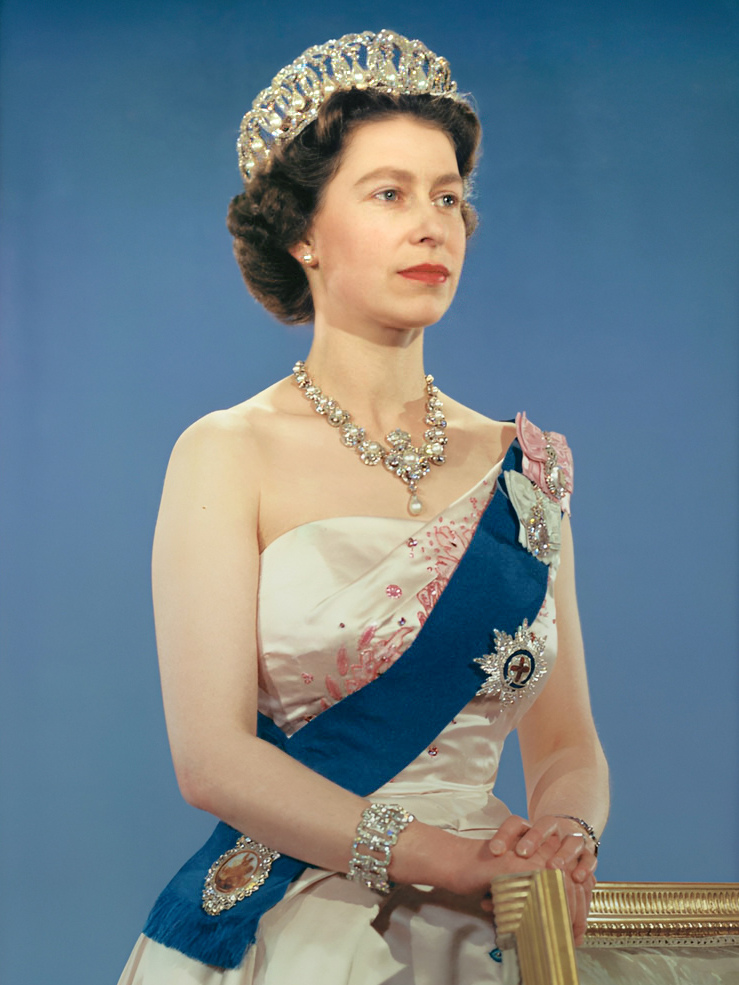
- Elizabeth II

Details
- Style: Her Majesty
- Formed: 6 March 1957
- Abolished: 1 July 1960

Elizabeth II was Queen of Ghana from 1957 to 1960, when Ghana was an independent sovereign state and a constitutional monarchy. She was also queen of the United Kingdom and other sovereign states. Her constitutional roles in Ghana were delegated to the governor-general of Ghana.

== History ==
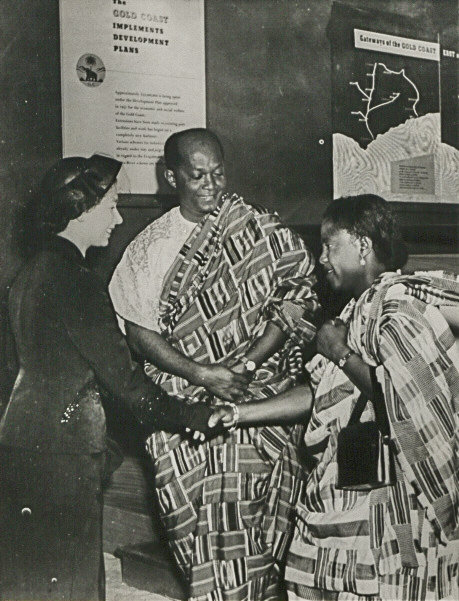
The Queen meeting Ghanaian government minister Komla Agbeli Gbedemah and his wife, 1953

Ghana was the first western African country to achieve independence from European colonization. British rule ended in 1957, when the Ghana Independence Act 1957 transformed the British Crown Colony of the Gold Coast into the independent sovereign state of Ghana, with Queen Elizabeth II as head of state on 6 March 1957. Princess Marina, Duchess of Kent represented the Queen at the independence celebrations. On 6 March, the Duchess formally opened the first parliament of independent Ghana, on behalf of the Queen, by giving the Speech from the Throne. The Duchess read the Queen's personal message to the people of Ghana, which said:

I have entrusted to my aunt the duty of opening on my behalf the first session of the Parliament of Ghana. My thoughts are with you on this great day as you take up the full responsibilities of independent nationhood and I rejoice to welcome another new member of our growing Commonwealth family of nations. The hopes of many, especially in Africa, hang on your endeavours. It is my earnest and confident belief that my people in Ghana will go forward in freedom and justice, in unity among themselves and in brotherhood with all the peoples of the Commonwealth. May God bless you all.

== Constitutional role ==
Ghana was one of the realms of the Commonwealth of Nations that shared the same person as Sovereign and head of state.

Effective with the Ghana Independence Act 1957, no British government minister could advise the sovereign on any matters pertaining to Ghana, meaning that on all matters of the Ghana, the monarch was advised solely by Ghanaian ministers of the Crown. The Queen was represented in Ghana by the Governor-General of Ghana, who was appointed by the monarch on the advice of the Ghanaian government. Two governors-general held office: Charles Noble Arden-Clarke (1957), and William Francis Hare, 5th Earl of Listowel (1957–1960).

=== The Crown and Government ===
Flag of the Ghanaian Governor-General featuring St Edward's Crown

The Queen and the National Assembly of Ghana constituted the Parliament of Ghana. All executive powers of Ghana rested with the sovereign. All laws in Ghana were enacted only with the granting of royal assent, done by the Governor-General on behalf of the sovereign. Every Ghanaian Bill presented to the Governor-General, had the following words of enactment:

Be it enacted by the Queen's Most Excellent Majesty, by and with the advice and consent of the National Assembly of Ghana in this present Parliament assembled, and by the authority of the same as follows—

The Governor-General was also responsible for summoning, proroguing, and dissolving Parliament. All Ghanaian ministers of the Crown held office at the pleasure of the Governor-General.

=== The Crown and Honours ===
Within the Commonwealth realms, the monarch is the "fount of honour". Similarly, the monarch, as Sovereign of Ghana, conferred awards and honours in Ghana her name. Most of them were awarded on the advice of "Her Majesty's Ghana Ministers".

See also

- 1958 Birthday Honours
- 1959 Birthday Honours
- 1960 Birthday Honours
- 1958 New Year Honours
- 1959 New Year Honours
- 1960 New Year Honours

== Title ==
The Royal Style and Titles Act, 1957 of the Parliament of Ghana granted the monarch a separate Ghanaian title in her role as Queen of Ghana.

Queen Elizabeth II had the following styles in her role as the monarch of Ghana:

- 6 March 1957 – 27 July 1957: Elizabeth the Second, by the Grace of God, of the United Kingdom of Great Britain and Northern Ireland and of Her other Realms and Territories Queen, Head of the Commonwealth, Defender of the Faith
- 27 July 1957 – 1 July 1960: Elizabeth the Second, Queen of Ghana and of Her other Realms and Territories, Head of the Commonwealth

== Oath of allegiance ==
The oath of allegiance in Ghana was:

"I, (name), swear that I will be faithful and bear true allegiance to Her Majesty Queen Elizabeth the Second, Queen of Ghana, Her Heirs and Successors according to law. So help me God".

== Abolition ==
After the 1960 Ghanaian constitutional referendum, Ghana adopted a new constitution that replaced the monarch and governor-general with a president. Ghana became a republic within the Commonwealth. The Queen sent a message to Ghanaians which said: "From midnight I shall cease to be your Queen. ... I am proud that I am Head of a Commonwealth in which every nation may choose for itself the form of Government which best suits it; now that Ghana has chosen for itself a republican form of constitution, it will not affect the interest which I have always taken and shall continue to take in the welfare of its people".

== Royal visits ==
The Queen said in her Christmas broadcast in 1958, that she and her husband would be visiting Ghana in late 1959. To celebrate the upcoming visit, the Ghanaian Government commissioned a new £2 coin with a new effigy of the Queen and the inscription "Queen of Ghana". However, the coin was never struck since the visit was postponed, as she had become pregnant in 1959.

In November 1959, Prince Philip paid a six-day visit to Ghana. During the visit, he inaugurated the Ghana Academy of Learning (now the Ghana Academy of Arts and Sciences), and was appointed its first president. He also met members of the Accra Market Women Traders' Association at the Governor-General's Lodge in Accra, who presented him with a gold tie-pin.

Queen Elizabeth II visited the Republic of Ghana from 9 to 20 November 1961 and from 7 to 9 November 1999.

During her 1961 tour, the Queen famously danced with Ghana's president Kwame Nkrumah at a farewell ball in Accra, which many scholars believe was a symbolic moment in the history of the Commonwealth. Despite bombings in the capital and fears that Ghana was getting too close to the Soviet Union, the Queen insisted on this tour to make sure that Ghana did not leave the Commonwealth. A dramatised version of this visit was portrayed in the episode "Dear Mrs Kennedy" in the second season of the Netflix series The Crown.

== Gallery ==
Queen Elizabeth II on Ghanaian Independence Issue stamps

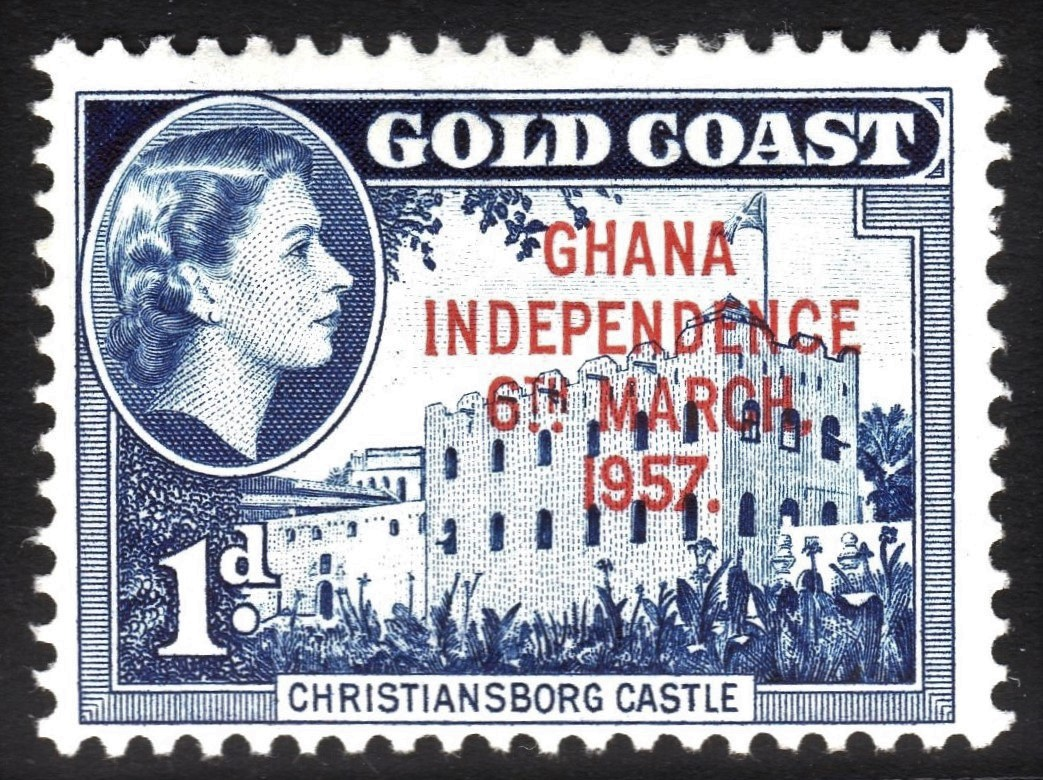

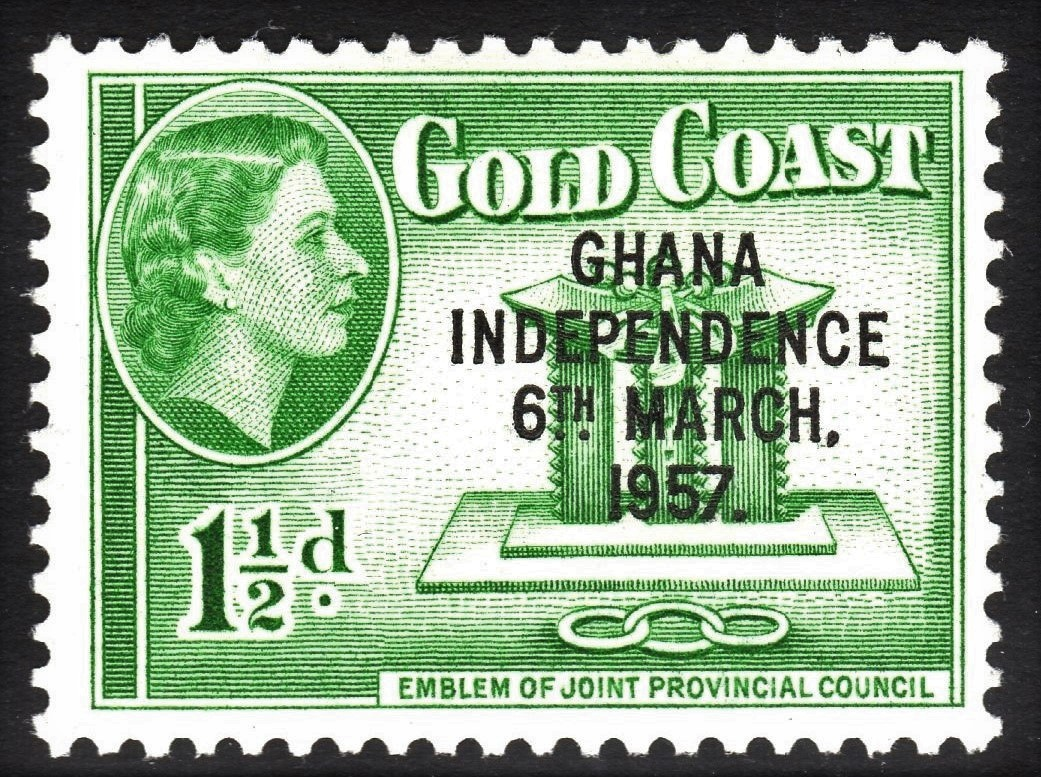

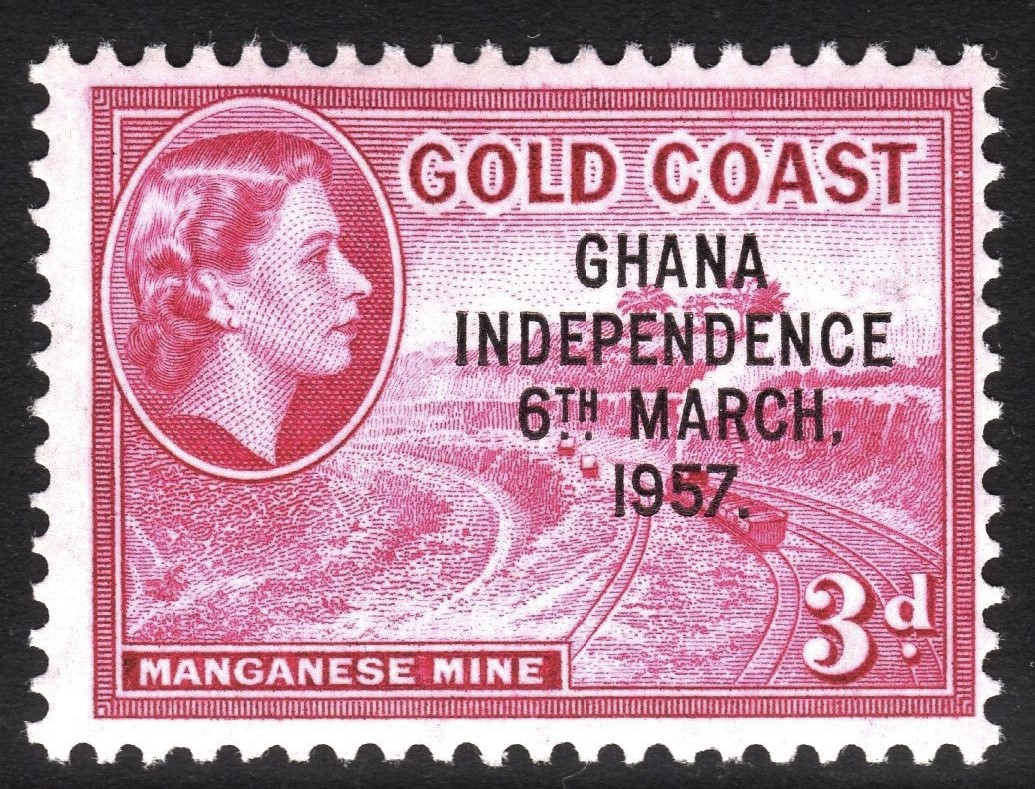

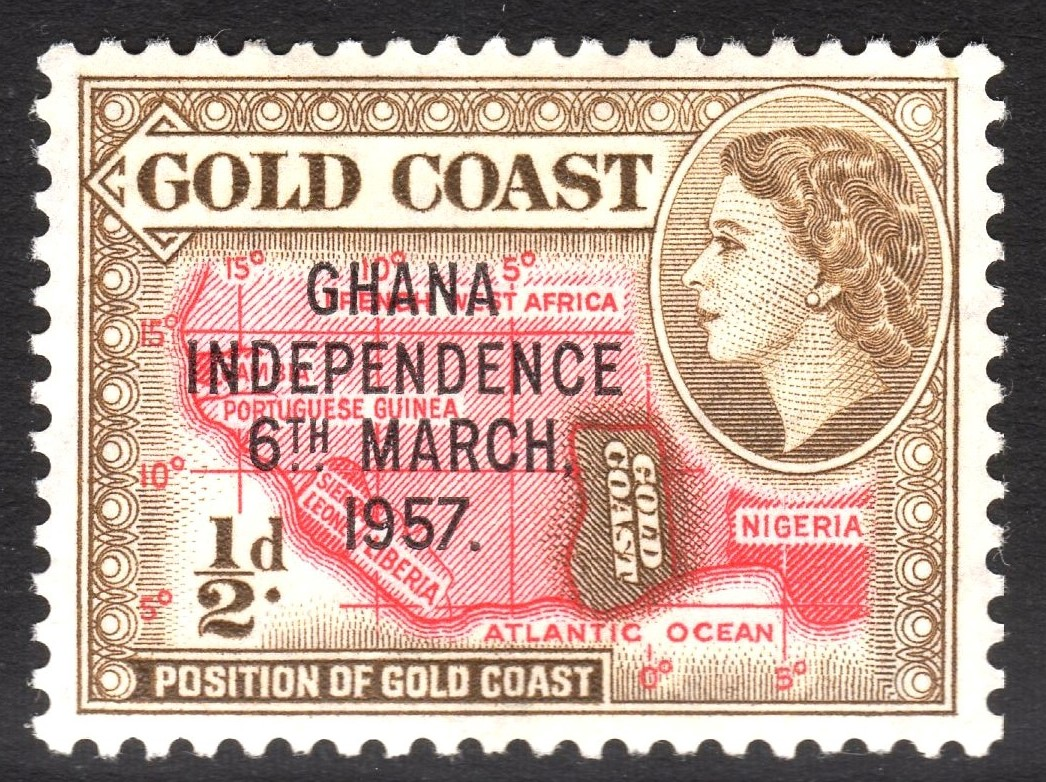

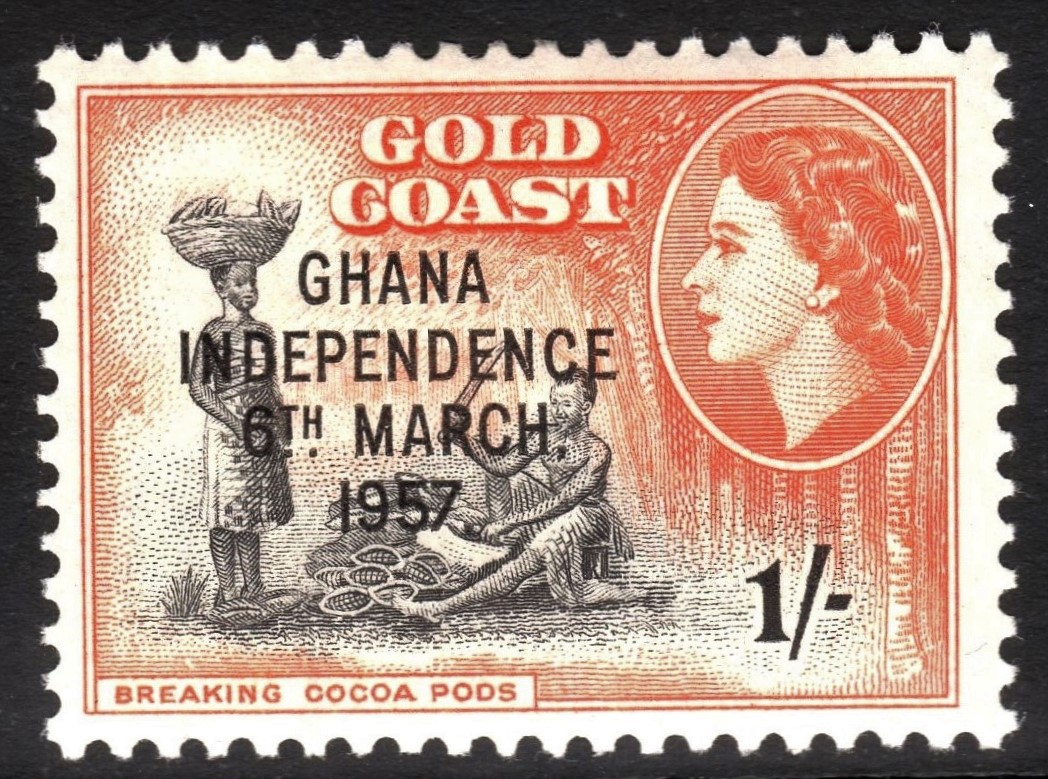

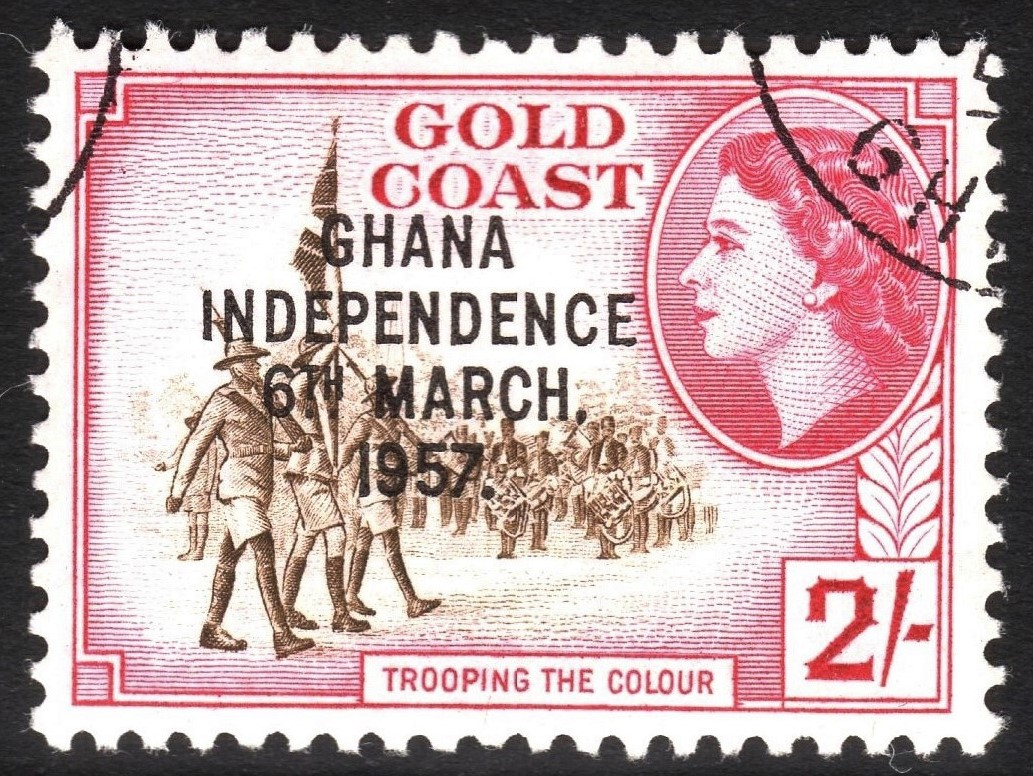

== See also ==
- Ghanaian constitutional referendum, 1960
- Ghana Empire
