= Ebenezer Augustus Kwasi Akuoko =

Ghanaian lawyer and politician (1928–2021)

Honourable Ebenezer Augustus Kwasi Akuoko

Member of the Ghana Parliament for Mampong North
- In office 24 September 1979 – 31 December 1981
- Preceded by: Akwasi Afrifa
- Succeeded by: Military coup

Personal details
- Born: 1928
- Died: 11 October 2021 (aged 92–93)
- Resting place: Asante Mampong
- Occupation: Politician
- Profession: Lawyer

Ebenezer Augustus Kwasi Akuoko (1928–2021) was a Ghanaian lawyer and politician. He was the Member of Parliament for Mampong North in the Third Republic of Ghana. He became a member of parliament following a by-election due to the execution by firing squad of Afrifa and other senior military officers on 26 June 1979. Afrifa had won the seat in the 1979 Ghanaian general election but never got to take his seat in parliament. His execution followed a coup d'état on 4 June 1979 which led to the formation of the Armed Forces Revolutionary Council military government.

Akuoko was married to Sophia Nana Wiba Sackey, with whom he had two daughters, Anastasia and Felicia. She died after a short illness in October 2019. Akuoko died in October 2021 aged 93. He had thirteen children.

== See also ==
- List of MPs elected in the 1979 Ghanaian parliamentary election

Parliament of Ghana
| Preceded by Akwasi Afrifa | Member of Parliament for Mampong North; 1979 – 1981 | Military coup |
