= Burma Camp =

Military facility in Greater Accra Region, Ghana

Coordinates: 5.596°N 0.155°W

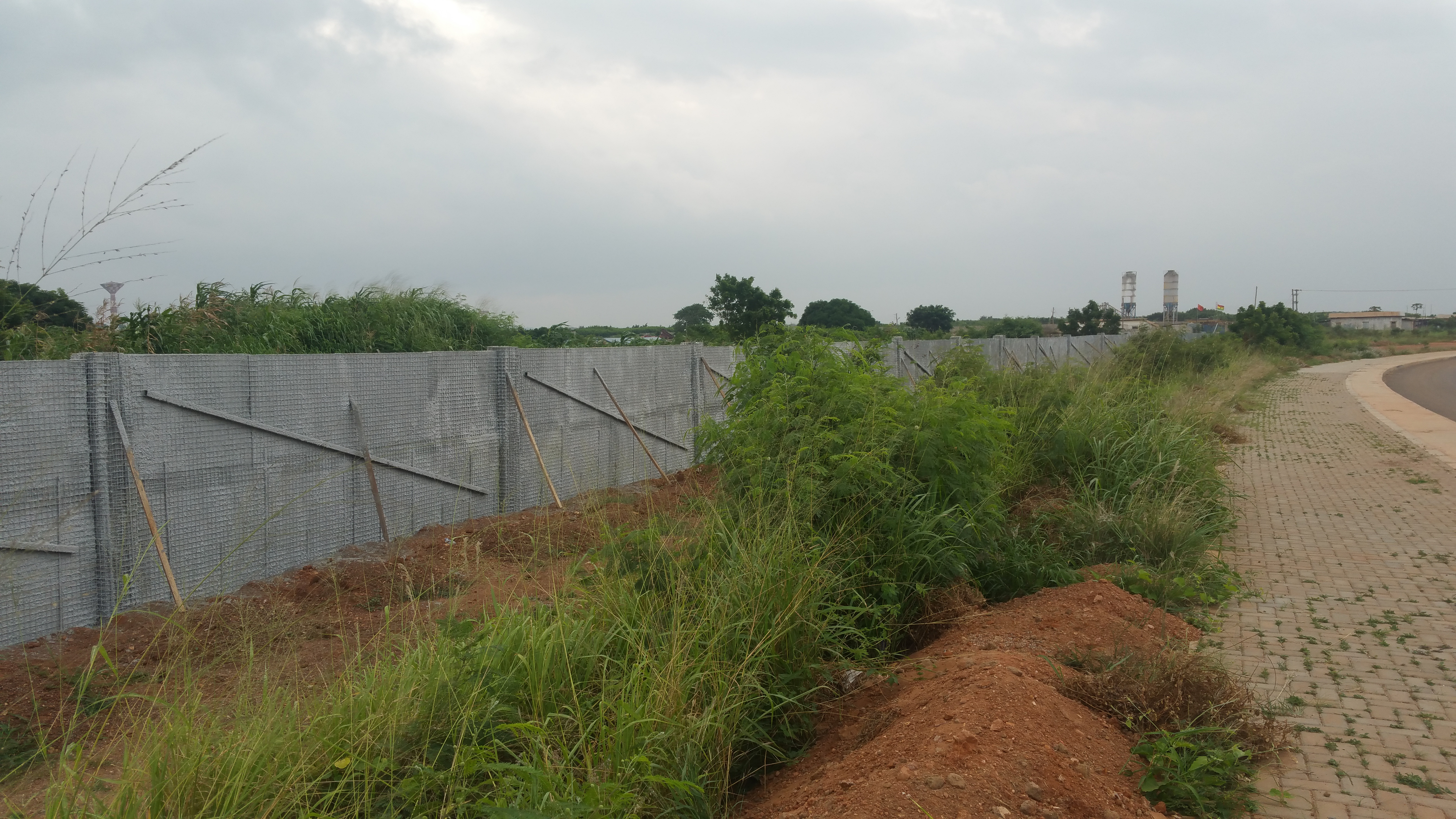
Burma Camp walls

Burma Camp is the headquarters of the Ghana Armed Forces and the Ghanaian Ministry of Defence. The camp is in Accra, Greater Accra, Ghana. It retains notoriety and fear from previous Ghanaian military regimes, when civilians who entered the camp might not re-emerge. It was the site of fighting during the June 1979 coup that placed Jerry Rawlings in power. The museum was opened on 5 March 1957. Burma Camp has twenty-four (24) schools, with a learner population of 14,712.

The Flower Pot interchange was constructed to ease traffic to Burma Camp.
