= 1960 Ghanaian constitutional referendum =

- 27 April 1960

Results
| Choice | Votes | % |
|---|---|---|
| Yes | 1,008,740 | 88.47% |
| No | 131,425 | 11.53% |

A constitutional referendum was held in Ghana on 27 April 1960. The main issue was a change in the country's status from a constitutional monarchy with Elizabeth II as head of state, to a republic with a presidential system of government.

== Results ==
| Choice | Votes | % |
|---|---|---|
| For | 1,008,740 | 88.47 |
| Against | 131,425 | 11.53 |
| Total | 1,140,165 | 100.00 |
| Registered voters/turnout | 2,098,651 | – |
Source: African Elections database

== Aftermath ==
Presidential elections were held alongside the referendum, which were won by the incumbent Prime Minister, Kwame Nkrumah. He was inaugurated on 1 July 1960, replacing Queen Elizabeth II as head of state, and thus eliminating the post of Governor-General.

Four years later another referendum strengthened the president's powers and turned the country into a one-party state (with an official result of 99.91% in support).
