= 1960 Ghanaian presidential election =

- 27 April 1960
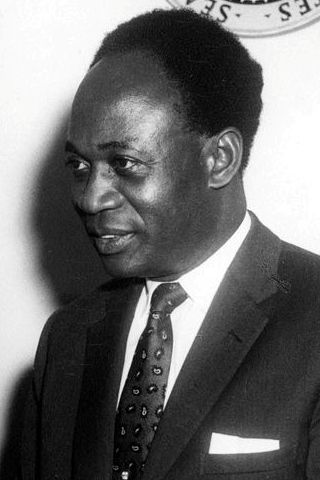

Nominee	Kwame Nkrumah	J. B. Danquah
Party	CPP	United Party
Popular vote	1,016,076	124,623
Percentage	89.07%	10.93%
Elected President
Kwame Nkrumah
CPP

Presidential elections were held for the first time in Ghana on 27 April 1960. The elections were held alongside a referendum on creating a republic with an executive presidency. The winner of the elections would become the country's first president if the new republican constitution was passed, which it did.

The conduct of the election was problematic, as the incumbent Nkrumah government used state resources to support Nkrumah, including pressuring civil servants to attend rallies and advertising in media.

== Candidates ==
There were only two candidates:

- Kwame Nkrumah, incumbent prime minister and leader of the Convention People's Party
- J. B. Danquah, United Party leader and one of the Big Six

== Results ==
Candidate	Party	Votes	%
Kwame Nkrumah	Convention People's Party	1,016,076	89.07
J. B. Danquah	United Party	124,623	10.93
Total		1,140,699	100.00
Registered voters/turnout		2,098,651	–
Source: African Elections Database

== Aftermath ==
After winning the election, and the passing of the new constitution in the simultaneous referendum, Nkrumah was inaugurated on 1 July 1960, replacing Governor-General William Hare as head of state. Danquah was imprisoned the following year under the Preventive Detention Act, but only held for a year. On his release, he was elected President of the Ghana Bar Association. He was imprisoned again in 1964 and died in jail.

Four years later, another referendum strengthened Nkrumah's powers and turned the country into a one-party state (with an official result of 99.91% in support).
