= June 4th revolution in Ghana =

1979 uprising in Ghana

June 4 revolution
Date	4 June 1979; 47 years ago
Location	Ghana
Result	Armed forces victory: Lieutenant General Fred Akuffo deposed and executed

Belligerents
Ghana (Supreme Military Council)	(Ghana) Armed Forces Revolutionary Council

Commanders and leaders
(Ghana) Fred Akuffo (executed)	(Ghana) Jerry Rawlings

The June 4th Revolution or June 4th Uprising was an uprising in Ghana in 1979 that arose due to a conflict between the lower ranks and officers in the Ghana armed forces. This led to frustration among the general public and misunderstandings within the Ghanaian army.

== Cause ==
The revolution began when the military government of the Supreme Military Council (SMC II), consisting of Lieutenant General Fred Akuffo, put Flight Lieutenant Jerry John Rawlings on public trial for attempting to overthrow the government on 15 May 1979. This failed coup had happened because Rawlings, a junior soldier in the Ghanaian Army, and other Ghanaian soldiers were not given their salaries.

Rawlings turned the trial against the government by accusing it of massive corruption and requesting his fellow accused to be set free as he was solely responsible for the mutiny. He was publicly sentenced to death and imprisoned.

On the night of 3 June 1979, junior military officers, including Major Boakye Djan, broke into the jail where Rawlings was held and helped free him. They then marched him to the national radio station to make an announcement. The first time the public heard from Rawlings was a statement that he had been released by the junior officers and that he was under their command. He requested all soldiers to meet with him at the Nicholson Stadium in Burma Camp in Accra.

The soldiers rounded up senior military officers, including three former heads of state, General Fred Akuffo, Ignatius Kutu Acheampong and Akwasi Afrifa for trial. They were executed by a firing squad.

== Aftermath ==
Rawlings was then appointed the head of the Armed Forces Revolutionary Council (AFRC) by the revolting junior military officers to run the country until the ongoing election was completed. Rawlings handed over his power to Hilla Limann in September 1979, but overthrew Limann's government on 31 December 1981.

== See also ==
- History of Ghana (1966–79)

== Bibliography ==
- Amamoo, Joseph G., "The Ghanaian Revolution", p. 190, iUniverse (2000), ISBN 9780595146277
- Ninsin, Kwame A., "Issues in Ghana's Electoral Politics", p. 40, CODESRIA (2017), ISBN 9782869786943
- Gocking, Roger, "The History of Ghana", Greenwood Publishing Group (2005), p. 212, ISBN 9780313318948
- The New York Times: "Hard. Times Follow Ghana Coup" (30 July 1979)
- El País: "Los golpistas de Ghana prometen elecciones este mes" (6 June 1979)
