= List of heads of state of Ghana =

This is a list of the heads of state of Ghana, from the independence of Ghana in 1957 to the present day.

From 1957 to 1960 the head of state under the Constitution of 1957 was the queen of Ghana, Elizabeth II, who was also the monarch of other Commonwealth realms. The monarch was represented in Ghana by a governor-general. Ghana became a republic within the Commonwealth under the Constitution of 1960 and the monarch and governor-general were replaced by an executive president.

== Monarch (1957–1960) ==
The succession to the throne was the same as the succession to the British throne.

| No. | Portrait | Name (Birth–Death) | Reign | | | Royal House | Prime minister |
| No. | Portrait | Name (Birth–Death) | Reign start | Reign end | Duration | Royal House | Prime minister |
|---|---|---|---|---|---|---|---|
| 1 | | Queen Elizabeth II (1926–2022) | 6 March 1957 | 1 July 1960 | 3 years, 117 days | Windsor | Nkrumah |

=== Governor-general ===
The governor-general was the representative of the monarch in Ghana and exercised most of the powers of the monarch. The governor-general was appointed for an indefinite term, serving at the pleasure of the monarch. Since Ghana was granted independence by the Ghana Independence Act 1957, rather than being first established as a semi-autonomous Dominion and later promoted to independence by the Statute of Westminster 1931, the governor-general was to be always appointed solely on the advice of the Cabinet of Ghana without the involvement of the British government, with the sole exception of Charles Arden-Clarke, the former colonial governor, who served as governor-general temporarily until he was replaced by William Hare. In the event of a vacancy the chief justice served as officer administering the government.

Status

Denotes Chief Justice acting as Officer Administering the Government

| No. | Portrait | Name (Birth–Death) | Term of office | | | Monarch | Prime minister |
| No. | Portrait | Name (Birth–Death) | Took office | Left office | Time in office | Monarch | Prime minister |
|---|---|---|---|---|---|---|---|
| 1 | | Sir Charles Arden-Clarke (1898–1962) | 6 March 1957 | 14 May 1957 | 69 days | Elizabeth II | Nkrumah |
| — | | Sir Kobina Arku Korsah (1894–1967) | 14 May 1957 | 13 November 1957 | 183 days | Elizabeth II | Nkrumah |
| 2 | | William Hare, 5th Earl of Listowel (1906–1997) | 13 November 1957 | 1 July 1960 | 2 years, 231 days | Elizabeth II | Nkrumah |

== Republic (1960–present) ==
Political parties

Convention People's Party (CPP)
People's National Party (PNP)
National Democratic Congress (NDC)
New Patriotic Party (NPP)

Other factions

Military
Independent

Status

Denotes acting president

Symbols

^{C} Constitutional referendum

^{†} Died in office

=== First Republic (1960–1966) ===
Under the Constitution of 1960, the first constitution of the Republic of Ghana, the president replaced the monarch as executive head of state. The president was elected by Parliament for a 5-year term. In the event of a vacancy three members of the Cabinet served jointly as acting president.

| No. | Portrait | Name (Birth–Death) | Elected | Term of office | | | Political party |
| No. | Portrait | Name (Birth–Death) | Elected | Took office | Left office | Time in office | Political party |
|---|---|---|---|---|---|---|---|
| 1 | | Kwame Nkrumah (1909–1972) | 1960; 1964^{[C]} | 1 July 1960 | 24 February 1966 (Deposed in a coup) | 5 years, 238 days | CPP |

=== Military rule (1966–1969) ===
Lieutenant-General Joseph Arthur Ankrah led a coup d'état which overthrew President Nkrumah and his government, all political parties and Parliament were also dissolved.

| No. | Portrait | Name (Birth–Death) | Term of office | | | Political party |
| No. | Portrait | Name (Birth–Death) | Took office | Left office | Time in office | Political party |
|---|---|---|---|---|---|---|
| 2 | | Lieutenant-General Joseph Arthur Ankrah (1915–1992); Chairman of the NLC | 24 February 1966 | 2 April 1969 (Resigned) | 3 years, 37 days | Military |
| 3 | | Brigadier Akwasi Afrifa (1936–1979); Chairman of the NLC | 2 April 1969 | 3 September 1969 | 154 days | Military |

=== Second Republic (1969–1972) ===
| No. | Portrait | Name (Birth–Death) | Elected | Term of office | | | Political party | Prime minister |
| No. | Portrait | Name (Birth–Death) | Elected | Took office | Left office | Time in office | Political party | Prime minister |
|---|---|---|---|---|---|---|---|---|
| (3) | | Brigadier Akwasi Afrifa (1936–1979); Chairman of the Presidential Commission | — | 3 September 1969 | 7 August 1970 | 338 days | Military | Busia |
| — | | Nii Amaa Ollennu (1906–1986) | — | 7 August 1970 | 31 August 1970 | 24 days | Independent | Busia |
| 4 | | Edward Akufo-Addo (1906–1979) | — | 31 August 1970 | 13 January 1972 (Deposed in a coup) | 1 year, 135 days | Independent | Busia |

=== Military rule (1972–1979) ===
General Ignatius Kutu Acheampong led a coup d'état which overthrew President Akufo-Addo, Prime Minister Abrefa Busia and his government, all political parties, and Parliament were also dissolved.

Lieutenant General Fred Akuffo led a palace coup which overthrew General Acheampong, then Flight Lieutenant Jerry Rawlings led a coup d'état which overthrew the Supreme Military Council.

| No. | Portrait | Name (Birth–Death) | Term of office | | | Political party |
| No. | Portrait | Name (Birth–Death) | Took office | Left office | Time in office | Political party |
|---|---|---|---|---|---|---|
| 5 | | General Ignatius Kutu Acheampong (1931–1979); Chairman of the NRC | 13 January 1972 | 5 July 1978 (Deposed in a coup) | 6 years, 173 days | Military |
| 5 | | Chairman of the SMC from 9 October 1975 | 13 January 1972 | 5 July 1978 (Deposed in a coup) | 6 years, 173 days | Military |
| 6 | | Lieutenant-General Fred Akuffo (1937–1979); Chairman of the SMC | 5 July 1978 | 4 June 1979 (Deposed in a coup) | 334 days | Military |
| 7 | | Flight Lieutenant Jerry Rawlings (1947–2020); Chairman of the AFRC | 4 June 1979 | 24 September 1979 | 112 days | Military |

=== Third Republic (1979–1981) ===
Under the Constitution of 1979 the president was head of both state and government. The president was directly elected and served a four-year term that expired at the next general election; a president might serve a maximum of two terms. In the event of a vacancy the vice-president served as acting president.

| No. | Portrait | Name (Birth–Death) | Elected | Term of office | | | Political party |
| No. | Portrait | Name (Birth–Death) | Elected | Took office | Left office | Time in office | Political party |
|---|---|---|---|---|---|---|---|
| 8 | | Hilla Limann (1934–1998) | 1979 | 24 September 1979 | 31 December 1981 (Deposed in a coup) | 2 years, 98 days | PNP |

=== Military rule (1981–1993) ===
Flight Lieutenant Jerry Rawlings led a coup d'état which overthrew President Limann and his government, all political parties and Parliament were also dissolved.

| No. | Portrait | Name (Birth–Death) | Term of office | | | Political party |
| No. | Portrait | Name (Birth–Death) | Took office | Left office | Time in office | Political party |
|---|---|---|---|---|---|---|
| 9 | | Flight Lieutenant Jerry Rawlings (1947–2020); Chairman of the PNDC | 31 December 1981 | 7 January 1993 | 11 years, 7 days | Military |

=== Fourth Republic (1993–present) ===
Under the current Constitution the president is head of both state and government. The president is directly elected and serves a four-year term that expires at the next general election; a president may serve a maximum of two terms. In the event of a vacancy, the vice president serves the remaining time as the president.

| No. | Portrait | Name (Birth–Death) | Elected | Term of office | | | Political party |
| No. | Portrait | Name (Birth–Death) | Elected | Took office | Left office | Time in office | Political party |
|---|---|---|---|---|---|---|---|
| (9) | | Jerry Rawlings (1947–2020) | 1992; 1996 | 7 January 1993 | 7 January 2001 | 8 years | NDC |
| 10 | | John Kufuor (born 1938) | 2000; 2004 | 7 January 2001 | 7 January 2009 | 8 years | NPP |
| 11 | | John Atta Mills (1944–2012) | 2008 | 7 January 2009 | 24 July 2012^{[†]} | 3 years, 199 days | NDC |
| 12 | | John Mahama (born 1958) | 2012 | 24 July 2012 | 7 January 2017 | 4 years, 167 days | NDC |
| 13 | | Nana Akufo-Addo (born 1944) | 2016; 2020 | 7 January 2017 | 7 January 2025 | 8 years | NPP |
| 14 | | John Mahama (born 1958) | 2024 | 7 January 2025 | Incumbent | 1 year, 317 days | NDC |

== Term of office in years ==
This is a list of each head of state in order of term length.

Of the 12 post monarchy heads of state, only two, Jerry Rawlings and John Mahama, served in two non consecutive periods.

| Rank | Head of State | Political party | Longest continuous term | Total time in office | Periods | Cause of end of term |
|---|---|---|---|---|---|---|
| 1 | Jerry Rawlings | Military/National Democratic Congress | 19 years, 7 days | 19 years, 119 days | 2 | Resignation/Natural expiration |
| 2 | John Kufuor | New Patriotic Party | 8 years, 0 days | 8 years, 0 days | 1 | Natural expiration |
| 2 | Nana Akufo-Addo | New Patriotic Party | 8 years, 0 days | 8 years, 0 days | 1 | Natural expiration |
| 4 | Ignatius Kutu Acheampong | Military | 6 years, 173 days | 6 years, 173 days | 1 | Deposed |
| 5 | Kwame Nkrumah | Convention People's Party | 5 years, 238 days | 5 years, 238 days | 1 | Deposed |
| 6 | John Mahama | National Democratic Congress | 4 years, 167 days | 6 years, 119 days | 2 | Natural expiration/In office |
| 7 | John Atta Mills | National Democratic Congress | 3 years, 199 days | 3 years, 199 days | 1 | Death |
| 8 | Joseph Arthur Ankrah | Military | 3 years, 37 days | 3 years, 37 days | 1 | Resignation |
| 9 | Hilla Limann | People's National Party | 2 years, 98 days | 2 years, 98 days | 1 | Deposed |
| 10 | Edward Akufo-Addo | Independent | 1 year, 135 days | 1 year, 135 days | 1 | Deposed |
| 11 | Akwasi Afrifa | Military | 1 year, 127 days | 1 year, 127 days | 1 | |
| 12 | Fred Akuffo | Military | 334 days | 334 days | 1 | Deposed |
| – | Nii Amaa Ollennu | Independent | 24 days | 24 days | 1 | |

== Standards ==
Governor-General's standard

Presidential standard

== Demographics ==
| Head of state | Ethnicity | Religious affiliation |
|---|---|---|
| Kwame Nkrumah | Nzema (Akan) | Roman Catholic (later non-denominational Christian) |
| Joseph Ankrah | Ga | Methodist |
| Akwasi Afrifa | Ashanti (Akan) | Anglican |
| Nii Amaa Ollennu | Ga | Presbyterian |
| Edward Akufo-Addo | Akuapem (Akan) | Presbyterian |
| Kofi Abrefa Busia | Bono (Akan) | Methodist |
| Ignatius Kutu Acheampong | Ashanti (Akan) | Roman Catholic |
| Fred Akuffo | Akuapem (Akan) | Presbyterian |
| Hilla Limann | Sissala | Roman Catholic |
| Jerry John Rawlings | Scottish/Anlo Ewe | Roman Catholic |
| John Agyekum Kufuor | Ashanti (Akan) | Roman Catholic |
| John Atta Mills | Fante (Akan) | Methodist |
| John Dramani Mahama | Gonja | Assemblies of God (raised Presbyterian) |
| Nana Akufo-Addo | Akuapem/Akyem (Akan) | Anglican (raised Presbyterian) |
