= 1964 Ghanaian constitutional referendum =

- 31 January 1964

Results
Choice	Votes	%
Yes	2,773,920	99.91%
No	2,452	0.09%
Valid votes	2,776,372	100.00%
Invalid or blank votes	0	0.00%
Total votes	2,776,372	100.00%

A constitutional referendum was held in Ghana on 31 January 1964. The proposed amendments to the constitution would turn the country into a one-party state and increase the powers of President Kwame Nkrumah and make him president for life. With results showing that an implausible 99.91% of voters supported the amendments, the referendum was accused of being "obviously rigged". Voter turnout was reported to be 96.5%.

== Results ==
Choice	Votes	%
For	2,773,920	99.91
Against	2,452	0.09
Total	2,776,372	100
Source: African Elections Database

== Aftermath ==
Following the successful passage of the constitutional amendments, the country became a one-party state with the Convention People's Party as the sole legal party (though the country had essentially been a one-party state since independence in 1957). Nkrumah became president for life of both nation and party, with greatly expanded powers; he could now remove members of the Supreme Court at his discretion. In effect, the amendments transformed Nkrumah's regime into a legal dictatorship. Elections were scheduled to be held under this system in 1965, but were cancelled shortly beforehand, with Nkrumah appointing MPs instead. However, Nkrumah was overthrown in a coup in February 1966, the CPP was dissolved, and the constitution suspended. Multi-party politics was restored by the time of the next elections in 1969.
