= Akwasi Afrifa =

Soldier, politician and former Head of state of Ghana (1936–1979)

Akwasi Amankwaa Afrifa
- Lt. Gen. Akwasi Afrifa

Chairman of the Presidential Commission
- In office 3 September 1969 – 7 August 1970
- Prime Minister: Kofi Abrefa Busia (1969 - 1972)
- Preceded by: Presidential Commission created
- Succeeded by: Nii Amaa Ollennu

Chairman of the National Liberation Council
- In office 2 April 1969 – 3 September 1969
- Preceded by: Joseph Arthur Ankrah
- Succeeded by: Himself (as Chairman of the Presidential Commission)

Personal details
- Born: 24 April 1936 Mampong-Ashanti, then part of the Colony of the Gold Coast
- Died: 26 June 1979 (aged 43) Accra, Ghana
- Cause of death: Execution by firing squad
- Spouse: Christine Afrifa
- Profession: Soldier

Military service
- Branch/service: Ghana Army
- Years of service: 1957–1970
- Rank: Lieutenant general

Lieutenant General Akwasi Amankwaa Afrifa (24 April 1936 – 26 June 1979) was a Ghanaian soldier, farmer, traditional ruler and politician. He was the head of state of Ghana and leader of the military government in 1969 and then chairman of the Presidential Commission between 1969 and 1970. He continued as a farmer and political activist. He was elected a member of Parliament in 1979, but he was executed before he could take his seat. He was executed together with two other former heads of state, General Kutu Acheampong and General Fred Akuffo, and five other generals (Edward Kwaku Utuka, Roger Felli, George Boakye, Robert Kotei and Joy Amedume), in June 1979. He was also popularly referred to by his title Okatakyie /ˈoʊkætætʃiː/ Akwasi Amankwaa Afrifa and was in addition the abakomahene of Krobo in the Asante-Mampong Traditional Area of the Ashanti Region of Ghana.

== Education and training ==
After his secondary education at Adisadel College, he joined the Ghana Army in 1957 and was sent to the Regular Officer's Special Training School. From there, he attended the Mons Officer Cadet School, Aldershot, England in 1958. He then completed officer training at the Royal Military Academy, Sandhurst, England. In 1961, he was at the School of Infantry, Hythe, United Kingdom.

Afrifa also attended the Defence College, at Teshie in Accra.

== Career ==
In 1960, Afrifa was commissioned as second lieutenant in the Ghana Armed Forces. From 1962 up to 1964, he was a general staff officer in the army. He next attended the Defence College, at Teshie in Accra. Afrifa was one of the officers who served in the Ghana contingent of the United Nations Operation in the Congo. Afrifa rose through the ranks to become a major. He was also staff officer in charge of army training and operations by 1965. He was based at Kumasi, at the headquarters of the Second Infantry Brigade (now the Central Command) of the Ghana Army.

== Politics ==
=== 24 February 1966 coup ===
While at Kumasi, Afrifa became friends with Emmanuel Kwasi Kotoka, then a colonel and the commander of the Second Infantry Brigade. At the time, Ghana had become a one-party state, political opposition was effectively removed with the Preventive Detention Act of 1958 and in 1964 Kwame Nkrumah declared himself president for life. Simultaneously, the export price of Ghana's main foreign exchange earner, cocoa, plummeted. This, combined with ambitious domestic expenditure on much needed social infrastructure and on well documented presumed white elephants such as the Volta dam, led to the bankruptcy of Ghana. There was a lot of discontent among the general population as prices rocketed for basic consumer goods which were widely unavailable, and among the Ghana Armed Forces. Nkrumah had asked the military at the time to prepare for a possible campaign in Rhodesia (now Zimbabwe) due to that country's recent unilateral declaration of independence under a white minority regime. Under the pretext of a training exercise, Kotoka moved his troops from Kumasi to Accra for the coup. Afrifa was his right-hand man in the coup exercise. It turned out later that, unhappy with Nkrumah's strengthening ties with the Soviet Union, China and other communist states, the Central Intelligence Agency of the United States had been kept updated about preparations for this coup and may have helped create difficulties for the Nkrumah government to facilitate this. The coup plotters struck while Nkrumah was on a trip to Hanoi, then the capital of North Vietnam. Afrifa's brief was to take the Broadcasting House, the base from which the national radio station broadcast its news and programmes. This succeeded after heavy fighting, allowing Kotoka to go on air to announce the coup d'état to the whole nation.

=== Allegations of atrocities ===
There have been allegations by members of Nkrumah's Presidential Detail Department (PDD) responsible for the personal protection of Nkrumah that they were physically tortured, some apparently in the presence of Kotoka, J. W. K. Harlley and Afrifa. Martin Okai, a member of the PDD, claimed at the National Reconciliation Commission hearings that his torture was supervised by Afrifa.

=== Time in government ===
Following the coup, Kotoka became one of the eight members of the National Liberation Council (NLC). Afrifa also went through a series of rapid promotions rising from major to lieutenant general in the three years his government was in power. He was also appointed the commissioner (minister) for Finance and Trade. The head of state of Ghana and chairman of the NLC, Joseph Arthur Ankrah was forced to resign in April 1969 following a bribery scandal involving Francis Nzeribe, a Nigerian businessman. He was replaced by Afrifa as head of state. Ankrah was accused of effecting payments to influence the results of a poll which showed him ahead of Afrifa and Kofi Abrefa Busia for the national elections due in August 1969. Afrifa was a supporter of Busia, the leader of the Progress Party who was a candidate in the forthcoming National Assembly elections. Afrifa handed over to Busia who became the prime minister of Ghana on inauguration of the Second Republic. He continued as chairman of the newly created Presidential Commission until August 1970 when he was replaced by Nii Amaa Ollennu, the speaker of Parliament in the Second Republic.

=== Campaign for democracy ===
After the overthrow of the democratically elected Busia government by Acheampong and the National Redemption Council, Afrifa, a known supporter of Busia was arrested two days later on 15 January 1972 and detained until December 1972. Following his release, Afrifa restricted himself largely to farming at his home town of Mampong. In 1978, the Supreme Military Council (SMC) government sought to introduce a new and widely criticized political system called Union Government (UNIGOV) which was to be a military and civilian partnership rather than a return to a multi-party democracy. A referendum was scheduled in March 1978, and Afrifa was one of the leaders of the Popular Movement for Freedom and Justice, which led the opposition to this UNIGOV concept. Joined by students and the intelligentsia among others, the PMFJ demanded a return to constitutional multi-party democracy.

=== Elected member of Parliament ===
Following the fall of Acheampong, the new SMC under General Fred Akuffo organized presidential and parliamentary elections on 18 June 1979 for a multi-party national assembly. The elections were, however, held under the government of the Armed Forces Revolutionary Council (AFRC) as the SMC itself had been overthrown on 4 June 1979. Afrifa stood for and won the Mampong North constituency seat on the ticket of the United National Convention, whose roots were from the Progress Party of Kofi Abrefa Busia. On 26 June 1979, eight days after his election, Afrifa was executed and thus never had the opportunity to take his seat in the Parliament of the Third Republic of Ghana and was succeeded in parliament by Ebenezer Augustus Kwasi Akuoko.

== Other roles ==
The late Asantehene (Asante king), Otumfuo Opoku Ware II, honoured Afrifa with the title "okatakyie" (meaning "hero" in Asante) after the NLC had returned power to the civilian Busia government. Afrifa was also the abakomahene of Krobo in the Asante-Mampong Sekyere Traditional Area in the Ashanti Region. Afrifa is also credited with initiating the Krobo Rehabilitation Project, raising funds leading to the rebuilding of the entire village.

== Family ==
Afrifa was the son of Opanin Kwaku Amankwa and Ama Serwaa Amaniampong, both from Krobo, near Mampong, in the Ashanti Region. At the time of his execution, he was married to Christine Afrifa, with whom he had nine children. His first Ama Serwa Afrifa, seven with Christine Afrifa; Baffour Afrifa, Baffour Anokye Afrifa, Maame Drowaa Afrifa, Serwaa Adimam Afrifa, Ayowa Afrifa, Sophia Amaniampong Afrifa and Akosua Afrifa. His last son Henry Afrifa was born after his death.

== Execution ==
=== Premonitions ===
Afrifa had written a letter to Acheampong expressing fears about the future execution of soldiers as a deterrent against the staging of military coups in Ghana, due to the prevailing corruption and indiscipline in the military. This was around the period of the UNIGOV campaign and before Acheampong was removed in a palace coup on 5 July 1978.

I feel greatly disturbed about the future after the government ... In order to discourage the military from staging coups in the future, how about if they line all of us up and shot us one by one? I do not certainly want to be arrested, given some sort of trial and shot. But I would be a stupid General if I sit in the comfort of my farm and await the VENGEANCE that is about to be unleashed on us. ... I will pray to take away the fear and confusion weighing on my mind now.

==== Execution ====
After the overthrow of the SMC by the AFRC led by Jerry Rawlings, Afrifa was again arrested on his farm at Mampong. Together with other arrested senior military officers, they were tried to varied extents in camera. They were apparently found guilty of corruption, embezzlement, and using their positions to amass wealth. The investigations carried out were apparently incomplete. Evidence gathered by the National Reconciliation Commission in 2004 also suggests that the others executed were not properly tried. Previously, Afrifa had personally had his assets probed by the independent Sowah Assets Commission without any adverse findings. There also appears to have been a delay to the executions as no one including Rawlings appears to have been ready to sign the death warrants. Lieutenant General Joshua Hamidu, a former chief of the Defence Staff at the time of the AFRC regime, stated that he and Rawlings were the only soldiers at the centre of government who opposed the executions of the former heads of state. He is quoted as saying in response to an accusation of calling for Afrifa's execution that:

That is ridiculous. It is a lie. I had nothing to do with the executions. For three weeks after the 4 June event, questions were constantly raised about executing people. I always stood against it. Surprisingly, the only person who also stood against it was Rawlings. The young boys wanted blood and I used to tell "you cannot resurrect the man once you've killed him. If you have any case against people, try them. Let everybody hear what they have done wrong against the country." And that even, they could not do.

On 26 June 1979, Afrifa was executed by firing squad, together with General Fred Akuffo, also a former head of state and Major General Robert Kotei, Colonel Roger Felli, Air Vice Marshal George Yaw Boakye and Rear Admiral Joy Amedume. Reports suggest that Afrifa did not die immediately and had to be shot again. The bodies of the executed officers were buried without ceremony at the Nsawam Prisons Cemetery at Adoagyiri, near Nsawam in the Eastern Region.

=== Reburial ===
Following a petition by the widows of the executed generals, President John Kufuor decided that their bodies be returned to their respective families as part of a national reconciliation. On 27 December 2001, the bodies were returned to their respective families in Accra. Afrifa's remains were finally laid to rest at his hometown of Krobo on 28 January 2002.

== Publications ==
- Afrifa, Akwasi Amankwaa (1966). The Ghana Coup, 24 February 1966. London: Frank Cass. ASIN B000H45GBC. OCLC 860314. with preface by K.A. Busia and introduction by Tibor Szamuely

== See also ==
- Akan names
- National Liberation Council

Political offices
Preceded by ?	Commissioner for Finance; 1966–69	Succeeded by Joseph Henry Mensah
Preceded by Kwesi Armah	Commissioner for Trade ? – ?	Succeeded by ?
Preceded by Joseph Arthur Ankrah; Military Head of state	Head of state of Ghana; Military regime 1969–70	Succeeded by Nii Amaa Ollennu; Chairman of the Presidential Commission of Ghana
Preceded by Joseph Arthur Ankrah; Military Head of state	Head of state of Ghana; Military regime 1969–70	Succeeded by Kofi Busia; Prime Minister of Ghana 1969
