= President of Ghana =

Head of state and government

President of the Republic of Ghana
- Presidential Seal of Ghana

- Presidential Standard of Ghana

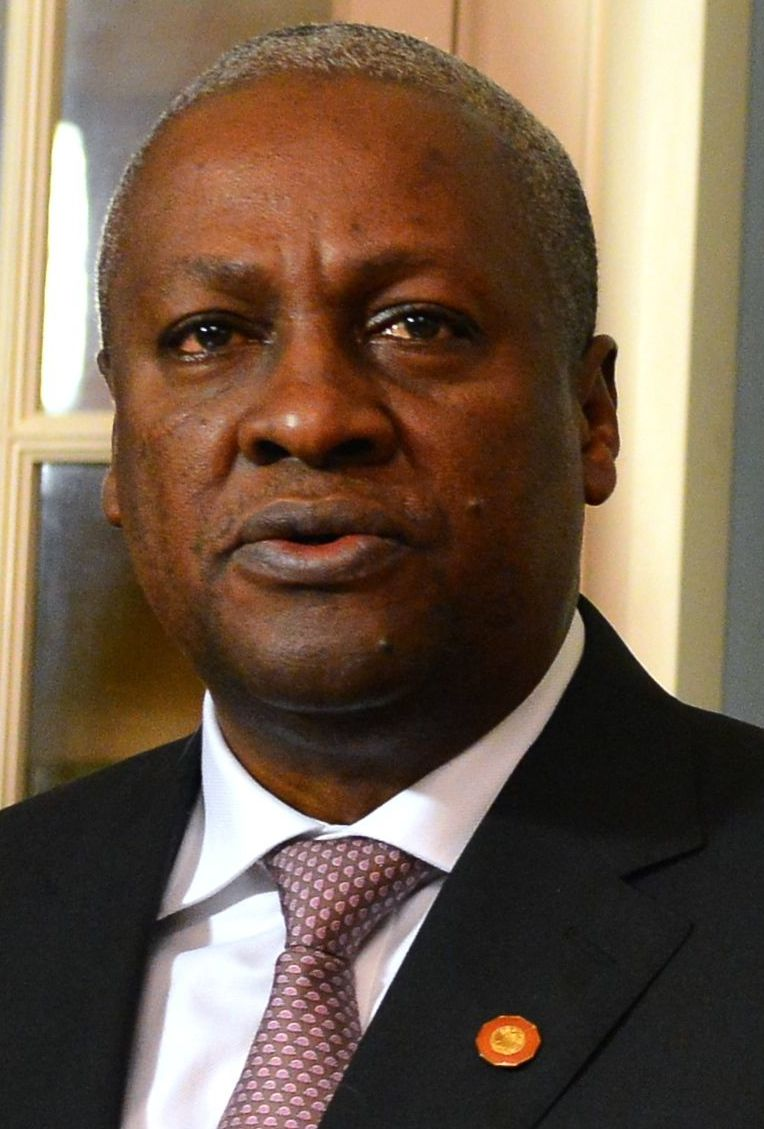
- Incumbent; John Mahama since 7 January 2025
- Style: His Excellency
- Type: Head of state Head of government
- Residence: Jubilee House
- Term length: Four years, renewable once
- Constituting instrument: Constitution of Ghana (1992)
- Inaugural holder: Kwame Nkrumah
- Formation: 1 July 1960; 66 years ago
- Deputy: Vice President of Ghana
- Salary: 934,800 Ghanaian cedi/US$76,000 annually
- Website: (in English) presidency.gov.gh (in English) ghana.gov.gh

The president of the Republic of Ghana is the elected head of state and head of government of Ghana, as well as commander-in-chief of the Ghana Armed Forces. The current president of Ghana is John Mahama, who won the 2024 presidential election against then vice president, Mahamudu Bawumia, by a margin of 14.94%. He was sworn into office on 7 January 2025.

== History of the office ==
From 1957 to 1960 the head of state under the Constitution of 1957 was the queen of Ghana, Elizabeth II, who was also the monarch of other Commonwealth realms. The monarch was represented in Ghana by a governor-general. Ghana became a republic within the Commonwealth under the Constitution of 1960 and the monarch and governor-general were replaced by an executive president. Kwame Nkrumah, who had been prime minister since independence, became the first president, holding office until he was overthrown in a 1966 coup orchestrated by the American CIA.

Civilian rule was restored in 1969, with the establishment of the Second Republic. In response to Nkrumah's authoritarian excesses, the constitution drafted a year earlier greatly reduced the powers of the president, to a point almost entirely ceremonial. Real power was vested in the prime minister and cabinet. The only president under this system, Edward Akufo-Addo, was elected by parliament in 1970, but was overthrown in a 1972 coup.

In 1979, a new constitution established the Third Republic, based on a mixture of the 1960 and 1969 constitutions. The presidency became an executive post once again, with powers and duties similar to those of his American counterpart. The only president under this system, Hilla Limann, was elected in 1979, only to be overthrown in a 1981 coup.

In 1992, the current constitution was adopted. Like its 1979 predecessor, it made the presidency an executive post. Jerry Rawlings, the country's de facto leader since the 1981 coup, was elected as president that year, taking office in 1993.

== Eligibility ==
According to Chapter 8, Article 62 of the 1992 Constitution of Ghana, a presidential candidate must meet the following requirements:

- (a) is a citizen of Ghana by birth
- (b) has attained the age of forty years; and
- (c) is a person who is otherwise qualified to be elected a Member of Parliament, except that the disqualifications set out in paragraphs (c), (d), and (e) of clause (2) of article 94 of this Constitution shall not be removed, in respect of any such person, by a presidential pardon or by the lapse of time as provided for in clause (5) of that article.

Presidential candidates must lodge a nomination document signed by at least two registered voters in each district, and includes the name of a vice presidential running mate.

The president serves a four-year term. He is limited to two terms, whether successive or separated. The first president for whom the term limits applied was Jerry Rawlings in 2001.

If the president dies, resigns, is permanently incapacitated, or is removed from office, the vice president automatically ascends as president for the balance of the term. If the vice president ascends to the presidency before more than half of the presidential term expires, the vice president is only allowed to run for a single full term as president. If more than half of the term has expired, the vice president is allowed to run for two full terms. For example, when John Atta-Mills died in 2012, Vice President John Mahama served the last six months of Mills' term before being elected in his own right later that year. He was eligible for a second term in 2016, but lost. He lost again in 2020 but won in 2024. However, he will have to leave office for good in 2029. If both the president and vice president are unable to perform the duties of president, the Speaker of Parliament becomes acting president, and new elections must be held within three months.

== Oath of office ==
The president of Ghana must be sworn in by the chief justice before Parliament and the citizens of Ghana. The president-elect must repeat the following:

"I, _______________ having been elected to the high office of President of the Republic of Ghana do (in the name of the Almighty God swear) (solemnly affirm) that I will be faithful and true to the Republic of Ghana; that I will at all times preserve, protect and defend the Constitution of the Republic of Ghana; and that I dedicate myself to the service and well-being of the people of the Republic of Ghana and to do right to all manner of persons.

I further (solemnly swear) (solemnly affirm) that should I at any time break this oath of office; I shall submit myself to the laws of the Republic of Ghana and suffer the penalty for it. (So help me God)".

== Insignia ==
After the oath of office has been taken by the elected president, these following insignia are handed over to the president. These devices are used to display the rank of his/her office and are used on special occasions.

- President's Sword (image) and the Presidential Seat, Presidential standard pole and state sword. A carved wooden seat overlaid with gold.

== Powers and duties of the president ==
Presidential styles of John Dramani Mahama
- Reference style: 'His Excellency President of the Republic of Ghana"
- Spoken style: Your Excellency"
- Alternative style: Mr. President

Chapter 8 of the Constitution of Ghana states the duties and the powers of the president. The president is required to:

- uphold the Constitution
- exercise executive authority
- preserve the safety and homeland of Ghana.

Also, the president is given the powers:

- as the leader of the executive branch of government
- as the commander-in-chief of the military
- to declare war
- to hold referendums regarding issues of national importance
- to issue executive orders
- to issue medals in honor of service for the nation
- to issue pardons
- to declare a state of emergency suspending all laws or enacting a state of martial law.

The president may execute or cause to be executed treaties, agreements or conventions in the name of the Republic of Ghana. The president shall take precedence over the populace of the Republic of Ghana and may refer important policy matters to a national referendum, declare war, conclude peace and other treaties, appoint senior public officials, and grant amnesty (with the concurrence of the Parliament of Ghana). In times of serious internal or external turmoil or threat, or economic or financial crises, the president may assume emergency powers "for the maintenance of national security or public peace and order".

The president shall be removed from office if found, in accordance with the provisions of the Constitution, Chapter 8 section 69 (ii) – prejudicial or inimical to the economy or the security of the Republic of Ghana. The president shall cease to hold office on the date the Parliament of Ghana votes to remove the president from office.

== Presidential aircraft ==
The official presidential aircraft is a Dassault Falcon 900, registration 9G-EXE, which was acquired in 2010. The aircraft was overhauled for six months in 2022, and returned to service in February 2023.

The presidential aircraft uses the colour scheme of the flag of Ghana in stripes, with the Ghanaian coat of arms on the tail.

In 2011, the government purchased an Embraer 190 making a part payment of $55m however it was revealed in 2020 that the jet was not delivered. There has been some speculation to whether or not the delivery was cancelled due to the government defaulting on its payment.

== Overview ==
The youngest person to become head of state was Jerry Rawlings, who at the age of 31, assumed office following a coup d'état in 1979. The youngest civilian head of state to assume the presidency was Hilla Limann, who was inaugurated at the age of 44. The oldest person to assume the presidency is Nana Akufo-Addo who was inaugurated at age 72.

At age 34, Akwasi Afrifa was the youngest head of state at the end of his tenure. Fred Akuffo's lifespan of 42 years was the shortest of any head of state. The oldest head of state at the end of his tenure is also Nana Akufo-Addo at 80.

Akufo-Addo's second retirement, now 1 year, 243 days, is currently the shortest, while Joseph Arthur Ankrah's retirement of 23 years is the longest in Ghana's history. At age 87, John Kufuor is the oldest of the three living heads of state, he is also the nation's longest-lived head of state. Kufuor and Nana Akufo-Addo are the only heads of state to have lived into their 80s. The youngest living head of state is John Mahama, age 67.

== See also ==
- Chief of Staff (Ghana)
- List of Ghanaian heads of state by age
