= Prime Minister of Ghana =

Head of government in Ghana; 1957–1960 and 1969–1972

- Flag of Ghana
- Appointer: Governor-General of Ghana (1957–1960); President of Ghana (1969–1972)
- Formation: 6 March 1957
- First holder: Kwame Nkrumah
- Final holder: Kofi Abrefa Busia
- Abolished: 13 January 1972

The prime minister of Ghana was the executive head of government of Ghana from independence in 1957 to 1960 and again from 1969 to 1972.

== History of the office ==
The country's first leader and prime minister was Kwame Nkrumah of the Convention People's Party (CPP). He held that post from the date of Ghana's independence – 6 March 1957 – until 1 July 1960, when a new constitution came into effect that abolished the position. Nkrumah became executive President of the Republic, but was later overthrown in a 1966 military coup.

When Ghana returned to civilian rule in 1969, the parliamentary system was restored. The Progress Party (PP), led by Kofi Abrefa Busia, won the parliamentary elections and Busia became Prime Minister on 1 October 1969. Busia's government was deposed in a military coup on 13 January 1972.

A presidential system was instituted in 1979 when civilian rule was re-established. The post of Prime Minister was never revived.

== Prime Ministers of Ghana (1957–1972) ==
Political parties

Convention People's Party (CPP)
Progress Party (PP)

No.	Picture	Name (Birth–Death)	Election	Term of office			Political Party
No.	Picture	Name (Birth–Death)	Election	Took office	Left office	Time in office	Political Party
Prime Minister of the Dominion of Ghana
1		Kwame Nkrumah (1909–1972)	1956	6 March 1957	1 July 1960	3 years, 116 days	CPP
Prime Minister of the Republic of Ghana
Post abolished (1 July 1960 – 1 October 1969)
2		Kofi Abrefa Busia (1913–1978)	1969	1 October 1969	13 January 1972	2 years, 103 days	PP
Post abolished (13 January 1972 – present)

== See also ==
- List of governors of the Gold Coast
- Lists of office-holders
- President of Ghana
- Vice-President of Ghana
