= Alec Garden Fraser =

British educator and Anglican vicar

Rev. Alec Garden Fraser MA, CBE
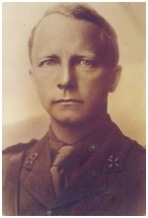
- Born: Alexander Garden Fraser; 6 October 1873; Tillicoultry, Clackmannanshire, Scotland
- Died: 27 January 1962 (aged 88); St Leonards-on-Sea, East Sussex
- Education: Merchiston Castle School, Edinburgh; Trinity College, Oxford
- Occupations: Educator; Clergyman
- Known for: Founder and first principal of Prince of Wales College and School, Ghana
- Term: 1924-1935
- Spouse: Beatrice née Glass
- Children: Alistair Garden Fraser; Alison
- Parent(s): Andrew Henderson Leith Fraser; Agnes Whitehead née Archibald

Alexander Garden Fraser (6 October 1873 – 27 January 1962), MA, CBE, was a British educator and Anglican priest. He served as principal at Trinity College, Kandy from 1904 to 1924. He subsequently became one of the founders of Achimota School and the first principal of the school (1924–1935).

== Trinity College, Kandy, Sri Lanka (formerly Ceylon) ==
Alexander Garden Fraser was born in Tillicoultry in Clackmannanshire on 6 October 1873, the eldest son of Sir Andrew Henderson Leith Fraser (1848-1919), later Lieutenant-Governor of Bengal, and his first wife Agnes Whitehead née Archibald (died 1879). He was named after his paternal grandfather Rev Prof Alexander Garden Fraser DD (1814-1904) a New York-born minister who joined the Free Church of Scotland and spent most of his life teaching in India.

Educated at Merchiston Castle School in Edinburgh, and Trinity College, Oxford, he initially intended to study law, but became involved with the Student Volunteer Missionary Union. He was ordained and eventually became a renowned educationist and missionary.

== Career ==
=== Trinity College ===
Fraser was the principal of the Trinity College, Ceylon, for the 20-year period from 1904 to 1924. Fraser is described by the college's website as its greatest principal.

Fraser and the then vice principal of Trinity College, Gaster, are credited for the College Chapel's open design. The design is similar to Achimota's Aggrey Memorial Chapel which is also an open chapel.

Fraser, as principal of Trinity College, took the school from a provincial school to a national college through recruitment and curricular change. Walter Senior, best known as the Bard of Lanka, was an example of the men who Fraser inspired to become Anglican missionaries at Trinity College. He also focused on national needs, using the local language and beginning instruction in agriculture, which was not taught in other local schools at the time.

During his years as Principal, Fraser obtained a lease of land from the War Office and levelled it to create a playing field, which was later to become the Asgiriya Stadium. Fraser left in 1924 to head a school, Achimota School, in Gold Coast.

== Achimota College and School ==
In 1924, the Gold Coast colonial government approved the funding for the proposed Prince of Wales College and School, now known as Achimota School, as part of the Governor, Gordon Guggisberg's, education reform programme for the Gold Coast. It was formally opened by the Governor, Sir Gordon Guggisberg, on 28 January 1927. Classes began with kindergarten and teacher training, and additional classes developed over time to cover all of pre-university education. The school partnered with London University for external degree courses.

Fraser left his position as Principal of the Trinity College, Ceylon, and accepted the position as Achimota School's first principal. He and James Aggrey, the School's first vice principal, supervised the construction and equipping of Achimota School. Fraser and the other founders made personal sacrifices to realise their dream of the first co-educational institution in the Gold Coast. They battled racism and harsh, and often unfounded, criticism.

When Aggrey died in the United States on 30 July 1927, Fraser wrote that it was Aggrey who persuaded him to go to Achimota, and describes Aggrey as most important of the founders in Achimota's success.

== Legacy ==
At Achimota School, Fraser and his staff, including Aggrey, shared the belief that Africans should not be turned into pseudo-Europeans but taught to retain the highest values of their own culture. This is reflected in the "Ideals Upon Which Achimota Was Founded". Fraser composed the school hymn that also embodies Achimota ideals.

== Family and memorials ==
“Fraser House", a boys’ residence hall that is now part of the secondary department was named in Fraser's honour. In addition, "Fraser Building" at Trinity College, Kandy, Sri Lanka, is named after him. His sons Alistair Garden (Sandy) and Andrew (his younger brother) both taught at Achimota for many years. He has several grandchildren, including Ian Fraser, a retired art professor.

He also had a daughter, Alison, after whom he named the Alison House at Trinity College, Kandy.

== Sources ==
- Aggrey, J.E.K. and Fraser, A.G.; Cambridge University Library: Royal Commonwealth Society Library, Y30448S
- Brief History of Trinity College
- Brody, Donal; "Permission granted by Dr. Brody", Great Epics Newsletter, Great Epic Books. (Summarized from the websites listed below.)
- Ghana Educational History
- Great Epic Books June 1998
- Great Epic Books July 1998
- Janus
- Lucy
- OAA 1973
- Ward, William Ernest Frank (1965), Fraser of Trinity and Achimota, Accra: Ghana Universities Press.
