= Patrick Fraser (cricketer) =

Scottish cricketer, sports agent and stockbroker

Personal information
- Full name: Patrick Shaw Fraser
- Born: 15 June 1892; Raipur, Central Provinces and Berar, British India
- Died: 1 March 1962 (aged 69); Everton, Lancashire, England
- Batting: Left-handed
- Bowling: Leg break
- Relatives: Charles Fraser (brother)

Domestic team information
- Years: Team
- 1911–1913: Scotland
- 1925–1927: Marylebone Cricket Club

Career statistics
Competition	First-class
Matches	9
Runs scored	289
Batting average	17.00
100s/50s	–/2
Top score	79
Balls bowled	54
Wickets	1
Bowling average	56.00
5 wickets in innings	–
10 wickets in match	–
Best bowling	1/14
Catches/stumpings	4/–
- Source: Cricinfo, 14 September 2021

Patrick Shaw Fraser (15 June 1892 — 1 March 1962) was a Scottish first-class cricketer, sports agent and stockbroker.

The son of Sir Andrew Fraser, he was born in British India at Raipur in June 1892 and was educated in England at Rugby School. Prior to the First World War, Fraser played first-class cricket for Scotland from 1911 to 1913, making six appearances, including playing once against the touring Indians in 1911 and twice against the touring South Africans in 1912. Fraser served in the First World War with the Royal Garrison Artillery, being commissioned as a temporary second lieutenant in September 1914. He later served in the Queen's Own Cameron Highlanders, holding the rank of temporary captain in November 1917. Fraser resigned his commission upon the completion of his service in October 1920, retaining the rank of captain.

Following the war he made three first-class appearances for the Marylebone Cricket Club from 1925 to 1927, with all three appearances coming against Wales. In nine first-class matches, Fraser scored 289 runs at an average of 17.00. He scored two half centuries, with his highest score of 79 coming for Scotland against Ireland in 1911. By profession, Fraser was a stockbroker and sports agent. Fraser married Peggy McArthur in December 1921. A resident of Alyth in Angus in the 1930s, he was charged with drink driving in January 1935, resulting in a £7 fine and his licence being revoked for a year. He died in England at Everton in March 1962. His brother, Charles, was also a first-class cricketer. Another brother was Alec Garden Fraser, an educator and clergyman.
