= James Emman Kwegyir Aggrey =

Gold Coast-born American educator (1875–1927)

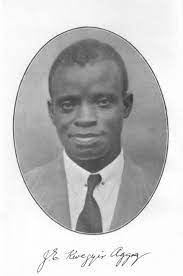
- Born: 18 October 1875; Anomabu, Gold Coast, British West Africa
- Died: 30 July 1927 (aged 51)
- Education: Wesleyan High School; Livingstone College; Columbia University
- Occupations: Missionary and teacher

James Emman Kwegyir Aggrey (18 October 1875 – 30 July 1927) was an intellectual, missionary, and teacher. He was an influential proponent of pan-Africanism.

He was born in the Gold Coast, British West Africa (modern Ghana) and pursued a college education in the United States, returning to Africa after earning his graduate degree at Columbia University. He was the first Vice Principal of Achimota College.

== Biography ==
Aggrey was born in Anomabu, the son of Princess Abena Anowa of Ajumako and Okyeame Prince Kodwo Kwegyir, the Chief Linguist in the court of the master chieftain King Amonoo IV of Anomabu. A relative to the Sam family and Cobbah of Komenda. In June 1883, he was baptized in a municipality in the Gold Coast and accepted his Christian first name James. His full name was given as James Emman Kodwo Mensa Otsiwadu Humamfunsam Kwegyir Aggrey. He attended Wesleyan High School (now Mfantsipim School) Cape Coast, where the teachers noted that he was precocious, already studying Greek and Latin, and he subsequently rose to become the school's headmaster.

In 1898, at the age of 23, Aggrey was selected due to his education to be trained in the United States as a missionary. On 10 July 1898, he agreed, and left the Gold Coast for the United States, where he settled in Salisbury, North Carolina, and attended Livingstone College. He studied a variety of subjects at the university, including chemistry, physics, logic, economics and politics. In May 1902 he graduated from the university with three academic degrees. Aggrey was very talented at languages and was said to have spoken (besides English) French, German, Ancient and Modern Greek, and Latin.

In November 1903, he was appointed a minister in the African Methodist Episcopal Zion Church in Salisbury. In 1905 he married Rose Douglas, a native of Virginia, with whom he had four children. In the same year he began to teach at Livingstone College. In 1912 he earned his doctorate in theology, and in 1914 followed a doctorate in osteopathy. In the same year he transferred employment to a small municipality to North Carolina. Between 1915 and 1917 Aggrey took up further studies at what is now known as Columbia University, where he studied sociology, psychology and the Japanese language.

In 1920 Paul Monroe, a member of the Phelps Stokes Fund offered Aggrey the opportunity to attend a research expedition to Africa to determine which measures were necessary for the improvement of education in Africa. Aggrey accepted and visited what are now ten different countries in Africa, where he collected and analyzed education data. In 1920 he visited Sierra Leone, Liberia, the Gold Coast now Ghana, Cameroon and Nigeria. In 1921 he visited the Belgian Congo, Angola and South Africa.

During this journey Aggrey made a significant impression and underscored the importance of education among some people who would become important figures in Africa, including Hastings Kamuzu Banda, later president of Malawi, Nnamdi Azikiwe, the first president of Nigeria, and Kwame Nkrumah, the first president of Ghana.

In Ghana, Aggrey delivered a lecture that persuaded Governor Guggisberg that Achimota College should be co-educational:

"The surest way to keep people down is to educate the men and neglect the women. If you educate a man you simply educate an individual, but if you educate a woman, you educate a whole nation."

In South Africa, Aggrey delivered a lecture that used the keys of the piano as an image of racial harmony:

"I don't care what you know; show me what you can do. Many of my people who get educated don't work, but take to drink. They see white people drink, so they think they must drink too. They imitate the weakness of the white people, but not their greatness. They won't imitate a white man working hard ... If you play only the white notes on a piano you get only sharps; if only the black keys you get flats; but if you play the two together you get harmony and beautiful music."

This image was the inspiration for the name adopted by the journal of the League of Coloured Peoples, The Keys.

In 1924, Aggrey was appointed by the Gold Coast governor Sir Frederick Gordon Guggisberg as the First Vice Principal of Achimota College in Accra. Aggrey designed the emblem of Achimota College. He resettled with his wife and children at the college, north of Accra.

In May 1927, he returned to the United States, and in July admitted to a hospital in Harlem, New York, where he died later that month.

Aggrey is buried in Oakdale Cemetery in Salisbury, North Carolina.

== Writing ==
- The Eagle That Would Not Fly (illustrated by Wolf Erlbruch)

== Legacy ==
In 1934 Aggrey House, London, was set up as a hostel for African students and students of African descent, and was named after Aggrey.

In November 2004, the City of Salisbury, North Carolina, and the State of North Carolina honored Dr. Aggrey and Mrs. Rose Aggrey with a historical marker at their Salisbury, North Carolina, home in recognition of their contributions to the City of Salisbury and the State of North Carolina. It was believed this was the first marker State of North Carolina had installed to honor a couple.

Buildings named for Aggrey include Aggrey Student Union at Livingstone College, and J.E.K. Aggrey Memorial Gymtorium at Landis Elementary School, built in the former location of Aggrey Memorial High School, built in 1933 for African-American children. Aggrey House at Kagumo High School, in Kenya, is named after him.

Freeman Aggrey House in his alma mater, Mfantsipim School, was named after him and Methodist priest, Rev. Freeman. A boys' residential house at Achimota School, Aggrey House, was named in his honor.

In 2017, Aggrey's picture appeared on the 5-cedi bill.

Aggrey has been named after a chapel belonging to the A.M.E. Zion Church in Mamprobi, Accra, Ghana. Aggrey House at Alliance High School in Kenya is named after him.

Aggrey is quoted as saying: "Nothing but the best is good enough for Africa." (This is sometimes worded as "Nothing but the best is good enough for the African.")

In 1947, the African Methodist Episcopal Zion Church took over the management of a private school founded by Rev. A. W. E. Appiah, a nephew of Dr. J. E. K. Aggrey and named the school Aggrey Memorial A.M.E. Zion Senior High School. This senior high school is presently located in Cape Coast in the Central Region of Ghana.

In 1932, Nigerian educator, statesman, activist and politician Dr Alvan Azinna Ikoku. established a Co-Educational Secondary School in Nigeria: the Aggrey Memorial Secondary School, located in Arochukwu and named after his mentor James E. K. Aggrey.

His eponymous great-nephew was the Ghanaian diplomat James Aggrey-Orleans.

There are numerous people in Africa and the Americas who are named after Aggrey such as Aggrey Burke.
