= Charles Fraser (cricketer) =

Scottish cricketer and soldier

Personal information
- Full name: Charles James Stewart Fraser
- Born: 5 February 1896; Nagpur, Central Provinces, British India
- Died: 18 October 1929 (aged 33); Woking, Surrey, England
- Batting: Unknown
- Bowling: Unknown
- Relatives: Patrick Fraser (brother)

Domestic team information
- Years: Team
- 1927/28: Europeans

Career statistics
Competition	First-class
Matches	1
Runs scored	13
Batting average	6.50
100s/50s	–/–
Top score	7
Balls bowled	60
Wickets	0
Bowling average	–
5 wickets in innings	–
10 wickets in match	–
Best bowling	–
Catches/stumpings	1/–
- Source: ESPNcricinfo, 9 November 2023

Charles James Stewart Fraser MC (5 April 1896 — 18 October 1929) was a Scottish first-class cricketer and an officer in the British Indian Army.

The son of Sir Andrew Fraser, he was born in British India at Nagpur in April 1896 and was educated in Scotland at the Edinburgh Academy. From there, he attended the Royal Military College, Sandhurst. Shortly after attending the college, the First World War began. Fraser fought in the war, being commissioned as a second lieutenant with a view to his appointment to the British Indian Army. He was attached to the 54th Sikhs in January 1915, with promotion in the regiment to lieutenant following in February 1917. Following the war, he was awarded the Military Cross for his services during the Mesopotamian campaign. In April 1919, he was promoted to captain.

Whilst in India, Fraser made a single appearance in first-class cricket for the Europeans cricket team against the Hindus at Lahore in the 1927–28 Lahore Tournament. Batting twice in the match, he was run out for 7 runs in the Europeans first innings, while in their second innings he was dismissed for 6 runs by Brij Lall. With the ball, he bowled ten wicketless overs. Whilst on leave in Britain in 1929, Fraser was killed in a car accident when his car overturned at the Six Crossroads junction near Woking, with him being thrown from the vehicle. His brother, Patrick, was also a first-class cricketer.
