= Kenneth Kafui =

Ghanaian composer (1951-2020)

Kenneth Kwaku Avotri Kafui
- Born: 25 July 1951
- Died: 18 March 2020 (aged 68); Accra, Ghana
- Other name: Kenn Kafui
- Education: University of Ghana
- Occupation: Composer

Kenneth Kwaku Avotri Kafui (July 25, 1951 – March 18, 2020) was a Ghanaian composer. He was a lecturer in music theory and composition at the music department of the University of Ghana, Legon. He was also the Director of Abibigromma Theatre Group of the University of Ghana. Born into a musical family, he was considered one of the leading composers of his generation in Ghana, in African art music. He composed choral works, works for choir and orchestra, symphonic works, piano and organ works, and works for traditional African instruments. He created new concepts and genres in African art music such as the Pentanata, the HD-3 form and Drumnata.

== Career ==
He taught at Achimota school and was popular with the students. Following graduation, Kafui joined the university faculty as a teaching assistant in the department of music. The following year, he became a senior research assistant. While working at the university, he gained further qualifications, including a Diploma in African Music (1982) and a Master's degree in music (2003).

Most of Kafui's compositions are orchestral or choral works, or pieces for solo piano. He also composed for the orchestra of the Ghana Broadcasting Corporation during the late 1970s.

Kafui served as the choirmaster for the Madina Evangelical Presbyterian Church, and the Hohoe Evangelical Presbyterian Church, where he was also the organist. He also played organ for Trinity College.

Kenneth K. A. Kafui was also a music tutor and the conductor of the Aggrey Memorial Chapel Choir at Achimota School before he moved on to the University of Ghana.

== Selected works ==
=== Choral ===
- Nutifafa (Peace), Op. 1 No. 1 (1972)
- Yehowa fe Lↄlↄ Lolo (God's Love is Great), Op. 1 No. 2 (1973)
- Dzifo Gbowo Navu, Op. 2 No. 1 (1974)
- Nunya Adidoe (Wisdom is like a Baobab Tree), Op. 1 No.5 (1979)
- Kokoeto (Holy One), Op. 1 No. 6 (1980)
- Dom Ko Mayi, Op. 2 No. 5 (1982)
- Miwↄ Dↄ Kple Lolo, Op. 1 No. 11 (1983)
- Ne Nyo Ko Noviwo, Op. 1 No. 12 (1984)
- Brighten the Corner where you Are, Op. 1 No. 14 (1988)
- Dzidzom
- Mida akpe na Mawu
- Migli
- Zↄdede

=== Orchestral ===
- Symphony No. 1 in D, Op. 3 No. 1 (1975)
- Rhapsody, Op. 3 No. 2 (1976)
- Kale, Op. 3 No. 3 (1977)
- Clarinet Concerto in B♭, Op. 3 No. 4 (1980)
- Pentaphony, Op. 3 No. 5 (1986)

=== Solo vocal ===
- Nunya (Wisdom), for Tenor and pianoforte (1976)
- Dzogbenyuie (Goodwill), for Tenor and pianoforte (1977)
- Eny yie Enuanom, for Tenor and orchestra (1986)

=== Solo piano ===
- 6 Easy African Piano Pieces (1976–7)
- Pentanata no. 1, Op. 10 No. 1 (1980)
- Visitation (1985)
- Black Visitation (1986)
- 4 Keyboard Songs (1986)
- Pentanata no. 2, Op. 10 No. 2 (1986)
- Divine Love and Peace (1987)
- Sonata in D (1987)

== See also ==
- N. Z. Nayo
