= Achimota School =

Boarding school in Accra, Ghana

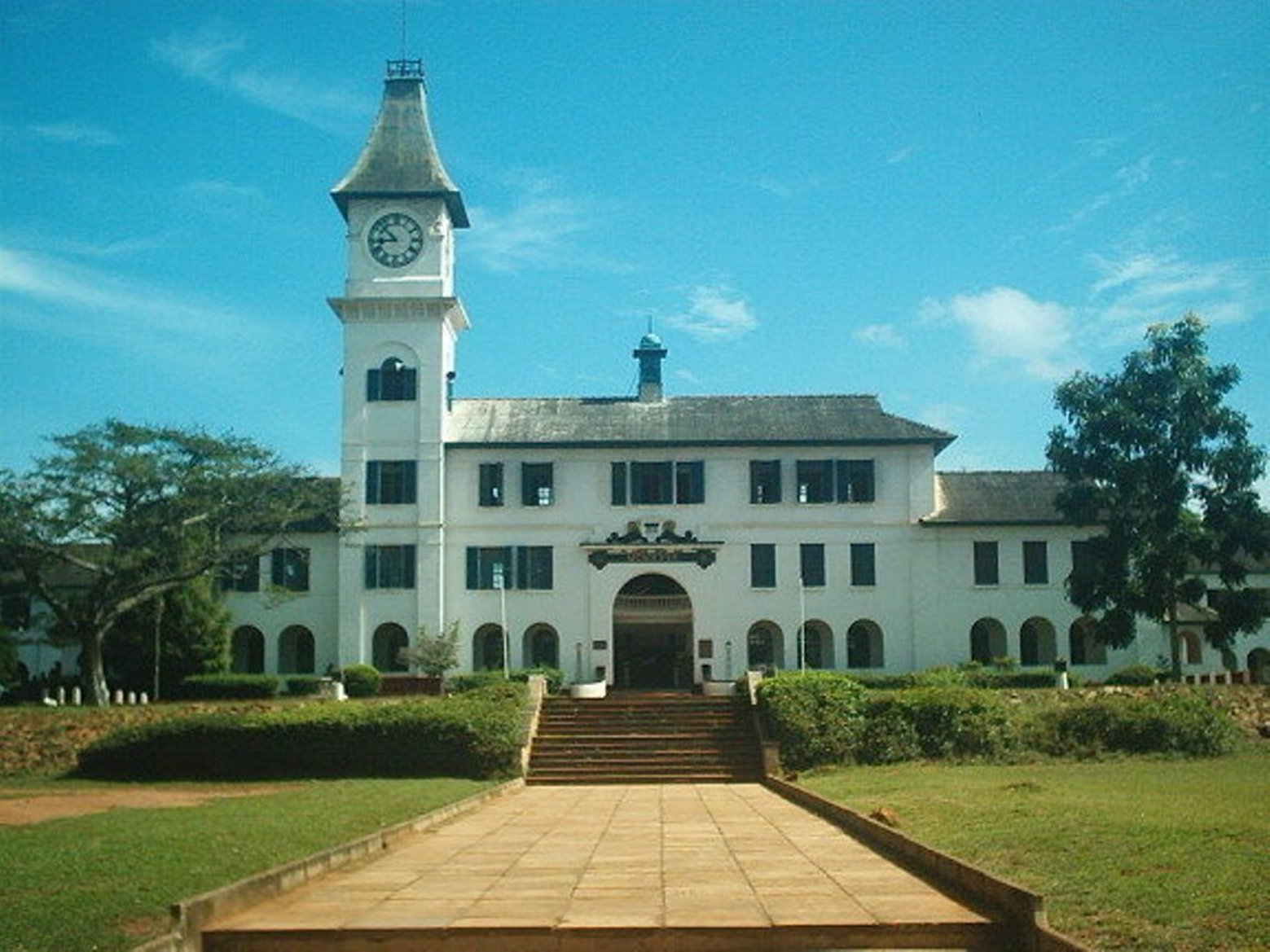

Location
- P.O. Box AH 11; Achimota; Accra, Greater Accra; Ghana; 05°37′38″N 00°12′49″W

Information
- Former names: Prince of Wales College and School at Achimota; Achimota College
- School type: Secondary co-educational boarding school
- Motto: Ut Omnes Unum Sint (That they all may be one)
- Religious affiliations: Non-denominational Christian; Non-sectarian
- Established: 28 January 1927; 99 years ago
- Founder: Sir Frederick Gordon Guggisberg, The Rev. Alexander Garden Fraser, Dr. James Emman Kwegyir Aggrey
- Status: Active
- School board: Board of Governors
- School district: Okaikwei North Municipal District
- Oversight: Ghana Education Service
- Chairperson: Osei Kwame Agyeman, Chairperson of the Board of Governors
- Head teacher: Ebenezer Graham Acquaah
- Staff: 130 teachers, 137 other staff
- Grades: Forms 1–3 (Grades 10–12)
- Gender: Co-ed (Boys/Girls)
- Age range: 14 to 18 years
- Enrollment: ca. 1500
- Education system: Senior High School
- Language: English
- Campus: Achimota School
- Campus size: 1,300 acres (525 hectares)
- Campus type: Residential garden-style setting
- Houses: 17
- Colours: Black and White
- Song: "From Gambaga to Accra"
- Nickname: Motown
- Publication: The Achimotan
- Endowment: Achimota School Endowment Trust
- Budget: Approx. $10 million annually
- Revenue: 40% government revenue; 40% boarding, maintenance and other fees; 20% other income, endowments, grants and donations
- Alumni: Akoras or Old Achimotans
- School hymn: "Grey city of the outlaw’s hill"
- Website: Achimota School

Achimota School (/ɑːtʃimoʊtɑː/ ah-ch-ee-m-oh-t-ah), formerly Prince of Wales College and School at Achimota, later Achimota College, now nicknamed Motown, is a co-educational boarding school located at Achimota in Accra, Greater Accra, Ghana. The school was founded in 1924 by Sir Frederick Gordon Guggisberg, Dr. James Emman Kwegyir Aggrey and the Rev. Alec Garden Fraser. Preparatory work and construction began in 1924, and Achimota was formally opened on 28 January 1927 by Guggisberg, then Governor of the British Gold Coast colony. Achimota, modelled on the British public school system, was the first mixed-gender school to be established on the Gold Coast.

The school has educated many Ghanaian leaders, including Kwame Nkrumah, Edward Akufo-Addo, Jerry John Rawlings, and John Evans Atta Mills, all of whom are former Heads of State of Ghana. John Mahama who was a Ghanaian President twice and also a former Vice President attended the Primary Department of the School and would have continued to the Secondary Department but for his father wanting him to follow up his education in a school in Northern Ghana to know his culture. Also, Kofi Abrefa Busia, a former Ghanaian head of government and prime minister, taught and studied at Achimota. Also included in its list of African heads of state are Zimbabwe's second president Robert Mugabe and Sir Dawda Jawara, first head of state of The Gambia. Former First Ladies of Ghana like Nana Konadu Agyeman Rawlings and Rebecca Akufo-Addo (primary department) also attended the School.. An alumnus/alumna of Achimota is known as an "Akora".

The motto of the school is Ut Omnes Unum Sint, meaning "That they all may be one", a reference to the founders' expressed philosophy that starting in the context of school life, black and white, male and female, everyone should integrate and combine synergistically for the good of all. The stylised piano-key design of the Achimota School crest was described by Aggrey at the time: "You can play a tune of sorts on the black keys only; and you can play a tune of sorts on the white keys only; but for perfect harmony, you must use both the black and the white keys."

== History ==
After the First World War, the Government of the Gold Coast felt the need for an advanced education. As Guggisberg put it, "In spite of the existence of one or two educational institutions of a secondary nature, the intellectual gap between the African who had completed his education at an English University and the semi-educated African of our primary school is dangerously wide. No one is more ready than I to sympathize with the legitimate aspirations of the African for advancement and for a greater share in the Government of this country, but if we are to help him to do this, if we are to protect the masses from the hasty and ill-conceived schemes of possible local demagogues, we must hasten as rapidly as our means will allow to fill up the gap between the two classes."

Achimota College was therefore established as part of Guggisberg's plan to reform the Gold Coast educational system. In August 1920, Guggisberg met and befriended native-born Dr. James Aggrey who was in the Gold Coast as a member of the Phelps Stokes Fund's African Education Commission. In 1922, as a result of the Phelps-Stokes Commission's 1920 report on education, Guggisberg appointed a committee to review its recommendations for Gold Coast education reform. That committee recommended the establishment of a comprehensive institution at Achimota to provide general secondary education, teacher training and technical education for male students. Achimota College was then conceived, thanks to the effort and support of Chiefs such as Nene Sir Emmanuel Mate Kole, Konor of Manya Krobo; Nana Sir Ofori Atta, Omanhene of Akyem Abuakwa and Nana Amonoo V, Omanhene of Anomabo, as well as prominent statesmen of the time such as the Hon. Dr. Benjamin W. Quartey Quaye Papafio, the Hon. F. V. Nanka-Bruce, both of Accra; the Hon. Thomas Hutton-Mills, Sr. of Accra, the Hon. E. J. P. Brown of Cape Coast, and the Hon. J. E. Casely-Hayford of Sekondi.

The Colonial government meant to carry out its policy to establish an excellent secondary institution where teachers as well as students would be trained. The Legislative Council went on to approve the 1923–24 budget for the establishment of the Prince of Wales College and School, and in March 1924, Guggisberg laid the foundation stone. Rev. Alexander G. Fraser was the first Principal (1924–1935), and Dr. James Aggrey was the first Vice-Principal (1924–1927). Fraser had previously been Principal of Trinity College, Kandy, an elite school in Ceylon, now Sri Lanka, and was hailed as the greatest colonial headmaster of his day by the Oxford Dictionary of National Biography. Aggrey campaigned vigorously for women's education at a time when the idea was not popular, and held the belief that to educate a man was to educate an individual, while educating a woman had more far-reaching benefits to family and community. This led to an increase in the number of places offered to girls by the college.

From 1924 until it opened on 28 January 1927, Guggisberg, Fraser and Aggrey worked together to realise Guggisberg's dream of establishing a first-class co-educational school and college. The University College of the Gold Coast, which is now known as the University of Ghana, had its roots in Achimota College. The University of Ghana holds its annual Aggrey-Fraser-Guggisberg Memorial Lecture series to honour the founders' contributions to education in Ghana. The Kwame Nkrumah University of Science and Technology (KNUST) also had its roots in Achimota College's Engineering School.

Achimota, originally known as the Prince of Wales College and School, was formally opened on 28 January 1927 by the then Governor of the Gold Coast, Sir Frederick Gordon Guggisberg. The guest of honour at the opening ceremony was Edward VIII, the then Prince of Wales, after whom the school was named. As one of the most prestigious institutions of its kind, known for its high academic standards and culture, it trained Pan-Africanist leaders during Sub-Saharan Africa's struggle for independence from colonial powers. From its student body and teaching college emerged many notable African personalities, including several heads of state, politicians, academics, scientists, doctors, lawyers, engineers, educators, architects, diplomats, computer scientists, agriculturists, accountants, artists, business leaders and industrialists. In a 2004 tribute to Akora Adrian Sherwood, a longtime English master at Achimota, the Ghana High Commission in London praised Achimota, quoting the words of the school's founding doctrine, for enabling its graduates "to know the life that is life indeed and go forth from it as living waters to a thirsty land."

Music has always played an important part in the life of the school. Achimota's achievements in attaining a high standard in this field led to the establishment of the Ghanaian National Symphony Orchestra and the department of music and performing arts education at the University of Education, Winneba. From its inception, Achimota emphasised the use of one's hands in agriculture, technical and vocational areas. Achimota has concerned itself to set a standard of excellence in whatever field of education meets the national needs.

== Campus life ==
=== Setting ===
Achimota School occupies over two square miles (525 hectares) of the middle of the Achimota Forest Reserve in the Accra Metropolitan Area. The campus facilities comprise two libraries, a cadet square, two chapels – the Aggrey Memorial Chapel and the Catholic Chapel; four dining halls, two on the eastern compound and another two on the Western campus, two gymnasia, the Achimota School Post Office, extensive sports playing fields, a swimming pool, a cricket oval, basketball court, tennis and squash courts, and an arboretum. There are several bungalows on campus for teaching staff members.

A description of Achimota School at its inception is provided below:

"Achimota College, in the Gold Coast seven miles inland from Accra is West Africa's great co-educational boarding school, where 600 West African boys and girls receive as complete an education as European or American children. It is a secondary school, teachers' training college and university rolled into one, and in planning, design and equipment it bears comparison with any educational institution anywhere. Its erection in 1925 cost £660,000 and its maintenance costs are £50,000 annually. It possesses a swimming pool, extensive playing fields, a nature reserve, a demonstration farm and a model village for the college employees. It also has its own hospital, museum, library and printing press. The students live in residential blocks spaced round the grounds, each holding 60 students and divided into 4 dormitories."

Close to the school's central campus are the Achimota Golf Club, the Achimota School Police Station, a staff village for the school's non-teaching employees also called Anumle, a forest reserve, a large farm, and the 45-bed Achimota Hospital, as well as the community surrounding the campus.

=== Houses ===
Achimota School has seventeen male and female houses on its Eastern (E) and Western (W) Compounds.

==== Male houses ====
- Fraser House (W) – named after Alec Garden Fraser (formerly House 12)
- Aggrey House (E) – named after James Kwegyir Aggrey; first house to be established on campus
- Guggisberg House (E) – named after Sir Gordon Guggisberg
- Gyamfi House (E) – named after a former student and member of the Asante royal family. Gyamfi died while a student at Achimota, and one of the consequences of his death was that the Asante Kingdom decided to have its own version of Achimota closer to home, thus was born Prempeh College.

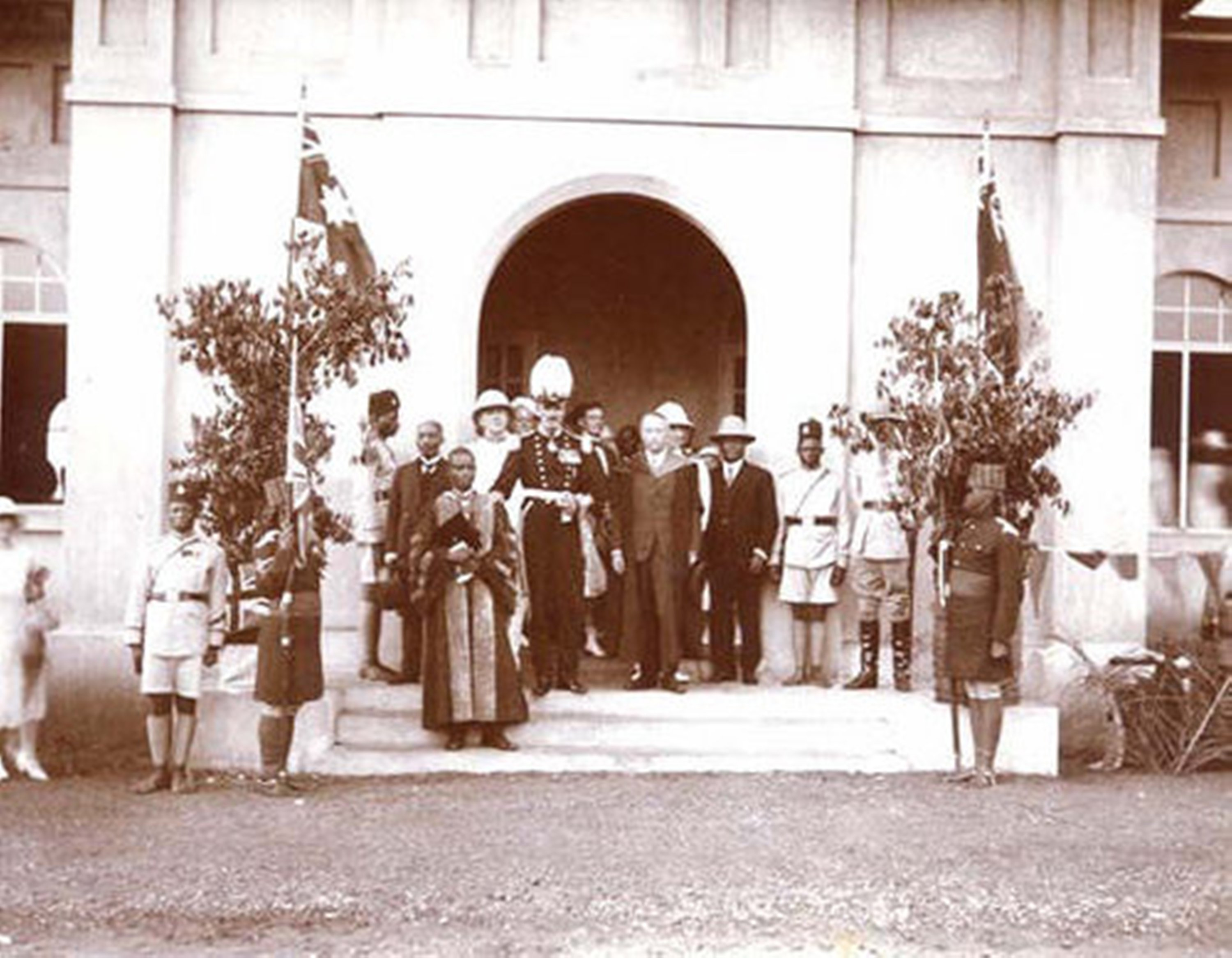
Inauguration of Achimota College, 1927

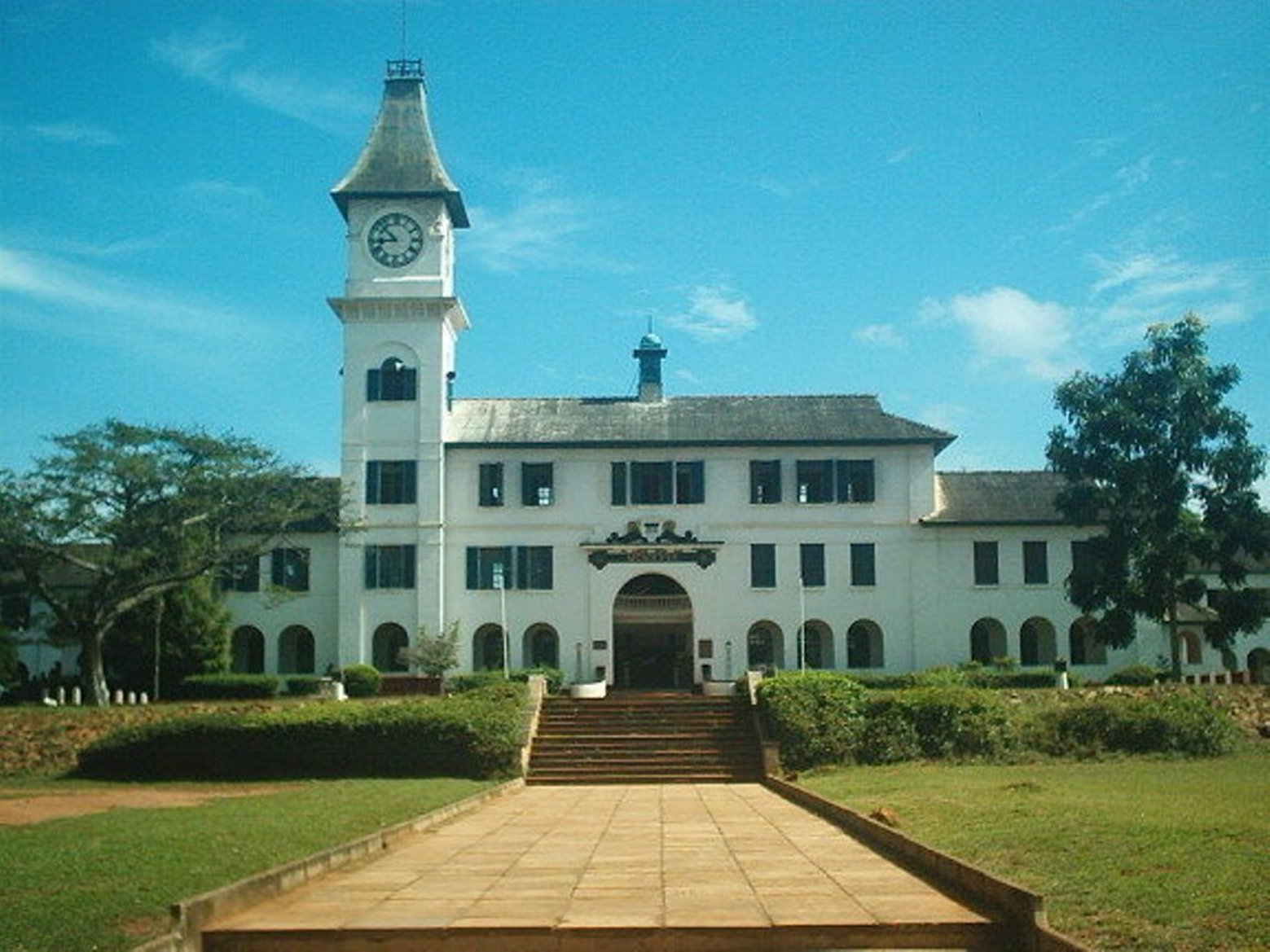
The Administration Block, MCMXXVII, is an iconic edifice of Achimota School. The tower clock, "Big Ben," seen from a distance, is shown against a blue sky.

- Cadbury House (E) – named after Cadbury
- Lugard House (E) – named after Lord Lugard, former Governor of Nigeria
- Livingstone House (E) – named after David Livingstone, a Scottish missionary explorer of Africa
- Kwapong House (W) – named after Alexander Kwapong, alumnus and first African Vice-Chancellor of the University of Ghana, Legon and Vice Rector of the UN University, Tokyo

==== Female houses ====
- Kingsley House (E) – named after Mary Kingsley, an English ethnographic and scientific writer and explorer
- McCarthy House (E) – named after Sir Charles McCarthy, a former British military governor to territories in West Africa (McCarthy House was formerly a male house and an Engineering School)
- Slessor House (E) – named after Mary Mitchell Slessor, a Scottish missionary in Nigeria
- Clark House (E) – named after English missionary Mary Clark. It was the first female house to be built.
- Ofori-Atta House (W) – named after Susan Ofori-Atta, alumna and Ghana's first female medical doctor (formerly House 11)
- Baeta-Jiagge House (W) – named after Annie Jiagge, alumna and the first woman to become a judge in Ghana and the Commonwealth of Nations (formerly House 17)
- Stopford House (W) – named in honour of Anglican Bishop and school principal (1941–45), Robert Stopford (formerly a male house and later, a female house, O. A. A. House and earlier, House 18)
- Atta Mills House (E) – named after John Evans Atta Mills, alumnus and President of Ghana (2009–12)
- Aryee House (E) – named after Joyce Aryee, alumna, politician and business executive

== Learning environment ==
In 2002, lessons in aspects of Ghanaian culture such as drumming, dancing and woodcarving were revamped in an effort to incorporate more of the national culture into the curriculum. Apart from the academic and intellectual development of its students, the school emphasises practical skills and character training. The school runs on a three-term academic calendar from mid-September to late June.

There are two departments, two designated Schools, and a Home Science Unit responsible for the teaching of the subjects offered. The Science and Mathematics Department teaches courses in mathematics, physics, chemistry, biology, agriculture and computer science, while the Arts Department teaches English language and literature, French, government, history, economics, geography, religion and social studies. The music school teaches music, trains the Aggrey Memorial Chapel Choir and organises music festivals; the Art School teaches visual arts; and the Home Science Department teaches home economics, catering, nutrition, life management, housekeeping, bookkeeping and clothing design.

In their first two years, students must take physical education and "religious and moral education" every term, taught by the sports and chaplaincy departments, respectively. Also on staff are four Christian chaplains (Catholic, Anglican, Methodist and Presbyterian) as well as a Muslim cleric. Each student is required to take seven or eight subjects (depending on the programme) during each term of their three years of secondary school; in addition to three or four elective subjects taken by every student in one programme of study, each student must take the four core subjects: mathematics, English language, integrated science and social studies.

The school's three-year programme (six semesters) leads to the West African Senior School Certificate Examination (WASSCE), in any of the general sciences, agricultural science, general arts, visual arts and home economics, all administered by the West African Examinations Council (WAEC) in May of their final year.

=== School Profile Summary ===
School Category Category A

School Code 0010110

School Accommodation Day/Boarding

School Gender Mixed (Boys/Girls)

School Courses Course programme categories offered at the school:

- Agriculture
- Home Economics
- Visual Arts
- General Arts
- General Science
- STEM(added 2024)

School Motto Ut Omnes Unum Sint (That They All May Be One)

== Principals and heads ==
Name	Tenure of office
A. G. Fraser, CBE	1924–35
H. M. Grace	1935–41
R. W. Stopford, KCVO, CBE	1941–45
H. C. Niell	1946–49
P. G. Rendall	1949–53
A. W. E. Winlaw, TD, OBE	1954–59
D. A. Chapman Nyaho, CBE	1959–63
I. K. Chinebuah, MP	1963–65
Alan P. Rudwick, OBE, GM	1965–77
Canon L. Ankrah	1977–81
A. A. Dadey	1982–85
Robert Winston Asiedu	1985–95
Charlotte Brew-Graves	1995–02
Adelaide Kwami, GM	2003–07
Beatrice T. Adom	2007–17
Joyce R. Addo	2017–19
Marjorie Affenyi	2019–22
Ebenezer Graham Acquaah	2022–

== Achimota School Songs ==
Some Achimota School songs include: the Achimota School Hymn, Achimota Mother Ours, The Achimota Yell, Ninoes' Song, I've Never Been to Cape Coast, Boy's Chorus, Girl's Chorus, From Gambaga to Accra, Kuzuinik, and Blemen, Ayekoo! Yaa Ye!

== Ties to similar schools ==
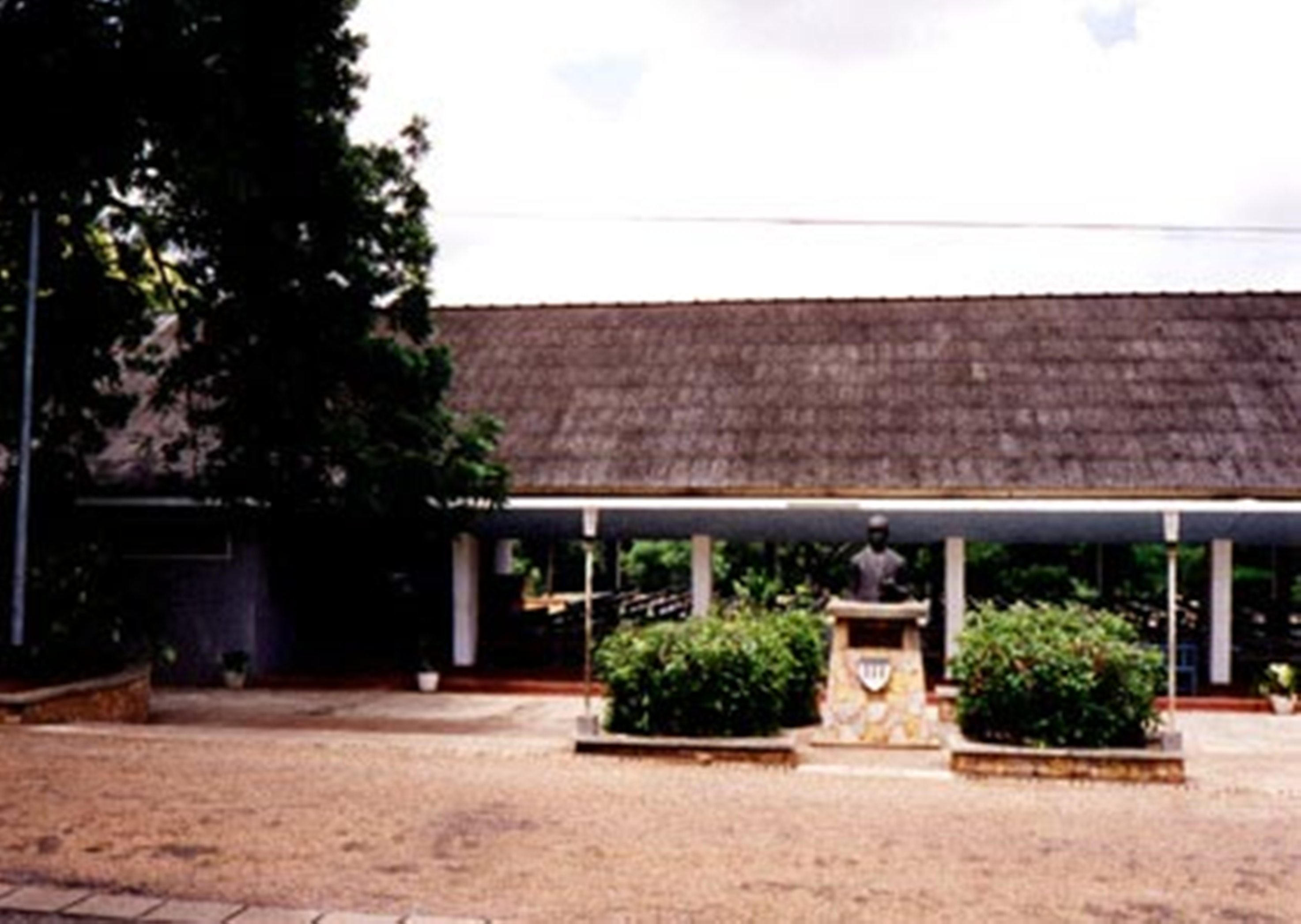
Aggrey Memorial Chapel

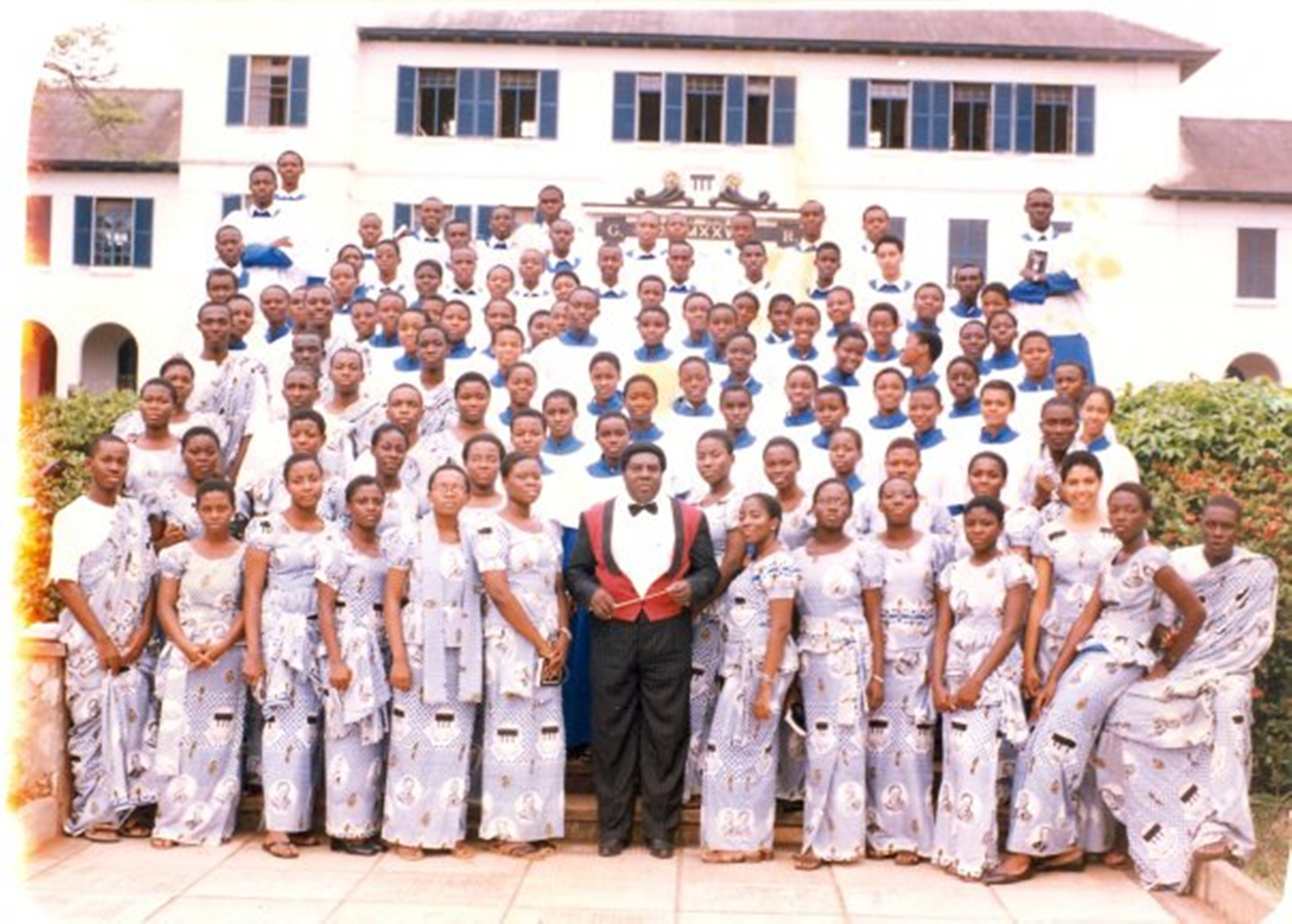
Aggrey Memorial Chapel Choir with Ghanaian composer and school choirmaster, Kenn Kafui in 2005

- Trinity College, Kandy, Ceylon now Sri Lanka (founded 1872): One of the founding fathers, Rev. Alexander G. Fraser (headmaster) was principal of Trinity College, Kandy from 1904 to 1924. He was the first principal of Achimota from 1924 to 1935. Also, Rev. Robert Stopford who headed Trinity College, Kandy, from 1935 to 1941, was principal of Achimota from 1941 to 1945. The famous Aggrey Memorial Chapel, venue for morning assembly, weekly Sunday services and other important events, was modelled on the open-style architecture of Trinity College Chapel, Kandy. Aggrey Chapel ranks among the most popular places in Accra to hold weddings.
- King's College, Lagos, Nigeria (founded 1909): Achimota and King's College had Inter-College Athletic Competitions during the 1960s and early 1970s. In 2008, Achimota School played host to King's College, Lagos, in a four-day exchange programme from Thursday 29 May 2008 to Sunday 1 June 2008. Activities lined up for the programme were hockey, cricket and football (soccer), with a dinner to round the competition off. The games were played at Achimota School's main playing fields. As King's College, Lagos celebrated its centenary in 2009, Achimota School was invited for a second Achimota School – Kings College Games Conference as part of the anniversary celebrations.

== Trivia ==
School mascot, "Kuziunik"

- Mascot: The school's mascot is a mythical creature called "Kuziunik" and is represented by a gargoyle-like wooden sculpture. In prior years, there was a tradition known as "Kuziunik's Night". The present location of the Kuziunik is atop a shelf by the east wall of the school library.
- Publications: Achimota School has two student magazines, "The Achimotan" and the more recent one "The Motowner" both published periodically. Two newsletters also exist on campus: The Blueprint (Originally a publication of Guggisberg House)and The Motown Express.
- P. T. A: Achimota School has a Parent-Teacher Association (PTA) that was formed during the era of Mr A. P. Rudwick, Headmaster (1965–1977). The body meets each term to discuss issues pertaining to students' welfare and school development.
- Ranking: Achimota School ranks among Africa's Top 100 High Schools according to a 2003 list compiled by Africa Almanac.
- University Leadership: Achimota has also produced a total of about ten vice-chancellors at Ghana's two leading public research universities, University of Ghana and Kwame Nkrumah University of Science and Technology, KNUST.

== Old Achimotan Association ==
The Old Achimotan Association (OAA) is the umbrella alumni organisation for past students of Achimota School. The OAA authorises the formation of regional, branch and year groups to carry out its objectives. Members of the OAA are known as "Akoras".

- History: The OAA was started in 1929 by the first principal of the then Prince of Wales College, Rev. Alec G. Fraser, whose son Sandy Fraser, then a member of Achimota School's staff, was the first organising secretary. Sandy spent his vacations touring towns and villages where Old Achimotans were working to explain the aims and objectives of the OAA. The OAA's first annual general meeting was held at the school on 23 December 1930, and then once a year thereafter. The participants spend three or four days on the school's campus.
- Constitution: The OAA is governed by a constitution, whose principal objective is "the formation of a bond of union between Old Achimotans and the School to promote the maintenance of their interest in the School and their willingness to assist in its welfare, and to promote the ideals for which Achimota was founded".
- National Executive Committee: The OAA's affairs and funds are managed by a National Executive Committee. The Committee consists of three officers of the association, two ex-officio officers, the immediate past president of the association and eight other members. The National Executive Committee is elected biennially at an Annual General Meeting. The OAA Alumni Office assists the National Executive Committee in its work.
