= Andrew Henderson Leith Fraser =

British officer of the Indian Civil Service (1848-1919)

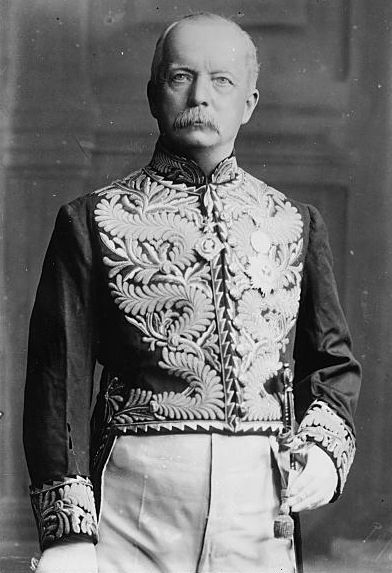
Sir Andrew Fraser

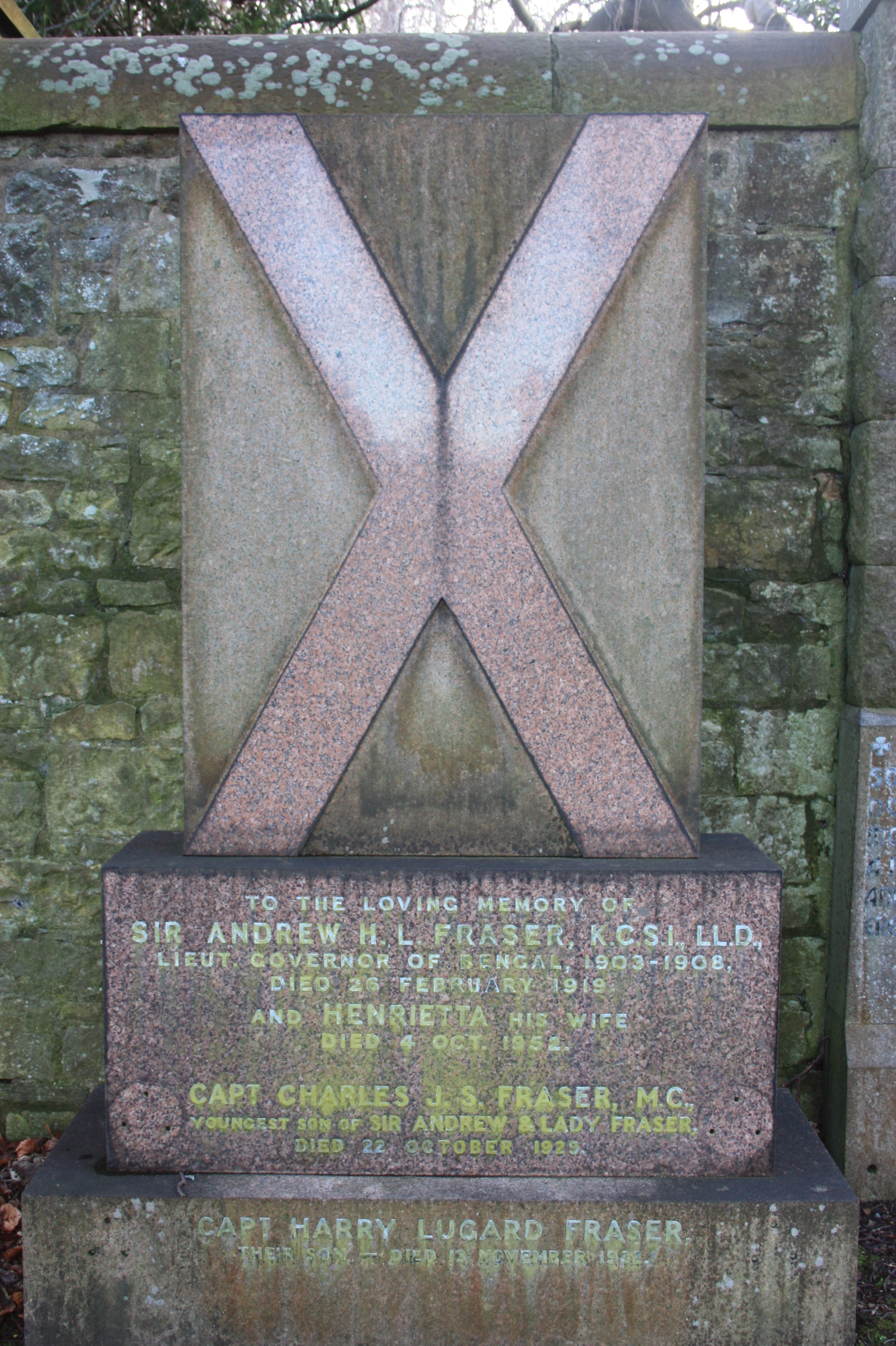
The grave of Sir Andrew Fraser, Dean Cemetery, Edinburgh

Sir Andrew Henderson Leith Fraser KCSI (14 November 1848 – 26 February 1919) was a British officer of the Indian Civil Service and the Lieutenant Governor of Bengal between 1903 and 1908.

== Early life and education ==
Born in Bombay on 14 November 1848, Fraser was educated at the Edinburgh Academy before being called to the Bar at the Middle Temple. He was a son of Rev. Alexander Garden Fraser (1814–1904) and Joanna Maria Shaw (1823–1864).

== Career ==
He joined the Indian Civil Service in 1871, serving in the Central Provinces for nearly thirty years. During his service he rose to be the Chief Commissioner of Central Provinces in 1899.

In December 1902, Fraser was picked as the new Lieutenant Governor of Bengal, following the sudden death of Sir John Woodburn the previous month. He did not take up the position until the middle of 1903, however, first finishing his duties as President of the Indian Police Commission.

Fraser retained the position of Governor of the Western province of Bengal following the 1905 Partition of Bengal. However, his role in the planning of partition of Bengal, earned him notoriety among nationalist agitators, with a notable assassination attempt in 1907 which attempted to derail his train. Another assassination attempt in November 1908 involved a pistol which failed to go off, the would-be assassin later declaring that he wanted to show Bengalis that even the Lieutenant-Governor was not invincible.

He was succeeded in 1908 by Sir William Baker.

He was elected President of The Asiatic Society for 1905–07.

In 1897, he was appointed a Companion of the Order of the Star of India (CSI), and he was knighted with the KCSI in the 1903 Durbar Honours.

Fraser 's published works include his memoirs Among Indian Rajahs and Ryots published in 1909, and India under Curzon and After published in 1911. He lived his final years at 22 Heriot Row in Edinburgh's Second New Town.

Andrew Henderson Leith Fraser died on 26 February 1919. He is buried in Dean Cemetery in Edinburgh, on the south wall of the north section, backing onto the original cemetery. The stone is very distinctive, carrying a St Andrews Cross in red granite by McGlashan.

He is also the founder and the first principal of one of the biggest and most popular public school Rajkumar College, Raipur, Chhattisgarh, India.

== Family ==
His wife Henrietta died in 1952. Their children included the cricketers Patrick and Charles Fraser MC (d.1929) and the soldier Cpt Harry Lugard Fraser and Professor Alec Garden Fraser, principal of Trinity College.

Preceded by Sir John Woodburn	Lieutenant-governor of Bengal; 1903–1906	Succeeded by Francis Slacke
