= Gold Coast Influenza Epidemic =

1918–1919 disease outbreak in Africa

The Gold Coast Influenza Epidemic was an influenza epidemic in Gold Coast (modern day Ghana) in 1918–1919, which killed more than 100,000 people in six months. Globally, 20 million people died from the outbreak in 1918. In the local parlance it was called "mfruensa" by the unschooled members of the society.

The Gold Coast Influenza strain was a genetic mutation of a regional virus known as swine influenza. The people living in the Gold Coast area had never come in contact with the new strain of influenza, so nobody was considered immune. The situation became worse because the health system of this British colony was understaffed and financially burdened. In 1919, the whole colony reportedly had only 43 physicians working in the public health sector.

== Influenza ==
Influenza is a respiratory disease that primarily affects the lungs, nose, and mouth. The 1918-1919 epidemic killed approximately 2% of Africa's total population. The Gold Coast Influenza strain was a genetic mutation of a virus in the region known as swine influenza. The people living in the Gold Coast area had never come in contact with the new strain of influenza, so nobody was considered immune. Being completely unprepared for a full-scale epidemic due to war preparations, the Gold Coast was left understaffed and financially burdened.

== Influenza Hits the Gold Coast ==
There was a previous pandemic of 1889-1893 which reached the Gold Coast in 1891.

The governor of Sierra Leone sent a message to the governor of Ghana on 28 August 1918 of an influenza outbreak and measures are to be taken because vessels coming from Accra or Sierra Leone are infected. The message arrived late. The American vessel S.S Shonga arrived in Cape Coast on August 31, 1918. The spread of the influenza virus caused schools, mosques and churches to close down. It is recorded that an estimated 100,00 people died of symptoms related to influenza out of the 1,504,000 recorded in 1911 census. Because the Gold Coast was experiencing a dry season in the Northern area, residents were at a greater risk for infection, hence the higher mortality rate. The only reported attempts to slow the spread of disease on behalf of the government involved quarantines, but it was not strictly enforced enough to put a quick end to the epidemic. It wasn't until 1950 that doctors found a vaccine that fought the strain, more than 30 years after the spread.

The whole colony by 1919 had 43 government physicians; 5 of them were administrators and 5 were vacant position. The government boys' school was now the hospital with a Principal Medical officer who was given 500 pounds to care for the sick.

== Dates of Recorded Cases ==
The table indicates the city and date they recorded their first case of the virus

Gold Coast Infection Dates
City	Date recorded case
Accra	3 September 1918
Koforidua	9 September 1918
Sekondi	18 September 1918
Saltpond	21 September 1918
Kumasi	23 September 1918
Winneba	24 September 1918
Tarkwa	25 September 1918
Axim	25 September 1918
Obuasi	1 October 1918
Yeji	8 October 1918
Keta	12 October 1918
Bole	26 October 1918
Wenchi, Sunyani and Kintampo	26 October 1918
Salaga	5 November 1918
Wa	7 November 1918
Lawra	15 November 1918
Tamale	12 November 1918
Tumu	16 November 1918
