= N. Z. Nayo =

Ghanaian academic, musician, composer

Nicholas Zinzendorf Nayo
- Born: 1922
- Died: 1993 (aged 70–71)
- Occupations: Academic and musician
- Known for: National Symphony Orchestra
- Title: Professor

Academic work
- Discipline: Musician

Nicholas Zinzendorf Nayo (1922 - 1993) was a Ghanaian academic, musician and composer.

== Music ==
Nayo initially taught music at Mawuli School from 1952 onwards.

Nayo became a lecturer at the University of Ghana, Legon. He rose to become the head of the School of Performing Arts at the Department of Drama and Theatre Studies. His contemporaries included Ephraim Amu.

He along with Philip Gbeho and Kenneth Kafui were leaders in Ghanaian orchestral music. In 1985, he became the director of the Ghana National Symphony Orchestra.

== Literature ==
Nayo is a leader in Ghanaian music and is cited in many publications.

== Compositions ==
Nayo has written a lot of music in Ewe. One of the popular once is "Aseye ne di" ("Let praises resound"). He also wrote the "Mandla overture" in honour of Nelson Mandela.

== Bibliography ==
- Nicholas Zinzendorf Nayo; Vinoko Akpalu (1964). Akpalu and His Songs. Legon: University of Ghana.
