= Gold Coast (British colony) =

British colony in Africa from 1821 to 1957

Coordinates: 5.5500°N 0.2167°W

Colony of the Gold Coast
- 1821–1957
- Flag Badge
- Anthem: God Save the King (1821–1837; 1901–1952); God Save the Queen (1837–1901; 1952–1957)
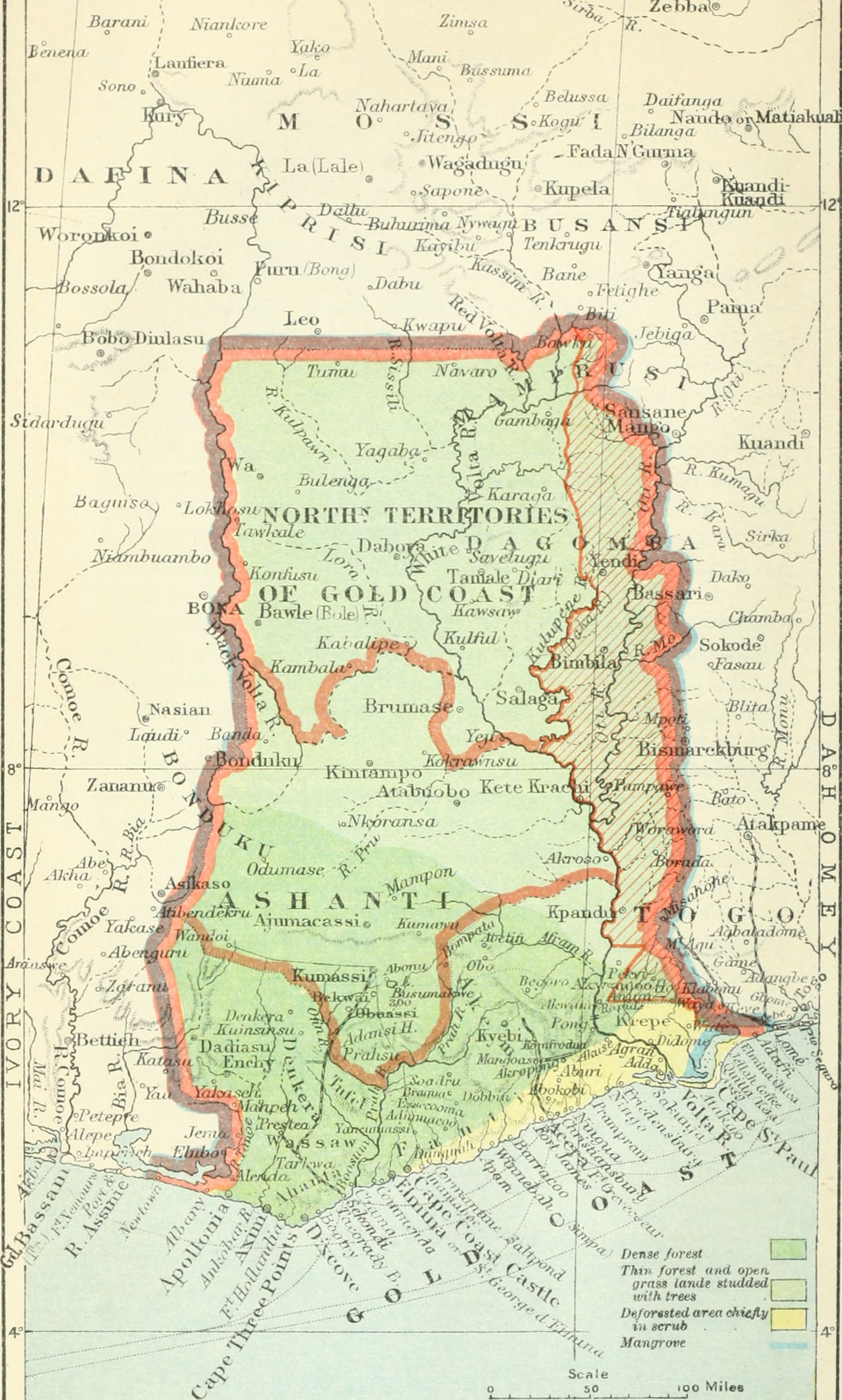
- The Gold Coast in 1922
- Status: Colony of the United Kingdom
- Capital: Cape Coast (1821–1877); Accra (1877–1957)
- Common languages: English (official); French, Ga, Akan, Ewe language, Dangme, Dagbani, Dagaare, Gonja, Kasena, Nzema widely spoken
- Religion: Christianity, Islam, Traditional African religions
- Monarch
  - 1821–1830 (first): George IV
  - 1830–1837 (second): William IV
  - 1837–1901 (third): Victoria
  - 1901–1910 (fourth): Edward VII
  - 1910–1936 (fifth): George V
  - 1936–1936 (sixth): Edward VIII
  - 1936–1952 (seventh): George VI
  - 1952–1957 (last): Elizabeth II
- Governor
  - 1821–1822 (first): John Hope Smith
  - 1949–1957 (last): Sir Charles Arden-Clarke
- Legislature: Legislative Council
- History
  - Colony established: 1821
  - Incorporation of the Danish Gold Coast: 1850
  - Incorporation of the Dutch Gold Coast: 6 April 1872
  - Combination with the local Asante Kingdom: 1901
  - Admission of British Togoland: 27 December 1916
  - New constitution establishing the Legislative Assembly (Note: An 84-member body, 38 of whom were to be elected by the people, 37 representing territorial councils, six appointed to represent commercial interests and three ex officio members appointed by the Governor. Those representing commercial interests and appointed by the Governor were all white.): 1951
  - Incorporation of British Togoland: 11 December 1956
  - Independence as the Dominion of Ghana: 6 March 1957

Area
- 1924: 207,199 km^{2} (80,000 sq mi)

Population
  - 1924: 2,080,208
- Currency: Gold Coast ackey, British West African pound
Preceded by
Ashanti Empire
British Togoland
Dutch Gold Coast
Danish Gold Coast
Succeeded by
Dominion of Ghana
- Today part of: Ghana

The Colony of the Gold Coast was a British Crown colony on the Gulf of Guinea in West Africa from 1821 until its independence as Ghana in 1957. The term Gold Coast may also refer collectively to the four separate jurisdictions administered by the Governor of the Gold Coast: the colony proper, Ashanti, the Northern Territories, and British Togoland. The name derives from the region's abundant gold resources, which attracted European traders, including the British.

The Gold Coast became a major centre of the Atlantic slave trade, with enslaved Africans exported to the Americas. British rule expanded through treaties, the acquisition of rival European possessions, and the conquest of African states, most notably the Ashanti Empire, and by the early 20th century encompassed territories that now form most of present-day Ghana.

Under British colonial administration, the Gold Coast developed an export economy centred on cocoa, gold, timber, and other natural resources, supported by expanding transport infrastructure. Following the rise of nationalist movements and constitutional reforms after the Second World War, the colony gained increasing self-government before achieving independence as Ghana on 6 March 1957.

== History ==
=== British rule ===
By the late 19th century, the British, through conquest or purchase, occupied most of the forts along the coast. Two major factors laid the foundations of British rule and the eventual establishment of a colony on the Gold Coast: British reaction to the Asante wars and the resulting instability and disruption of trade, and Britain's increasing preoccupation with the suppression and elimination of the slave trade.

During most of the 19th century, Asante, the most powerful state of the Akan interior, sought to expand its rule and to promote and protect its trade. The first Asante invasion of the coastal regions took place in 1807; the Asante moved south again in the Ga-Fante War of 1811 and in the Ashanti–Akim–Akwapim War of 1814–16. These invasions, though not decisive, disrupted trade in such products as feathers, ivory, rubber and palm oil, and threatened the security of the European forts. Local British, Dutch, and Danish authorities were all forced to come to terms with the Asante. In 1817, the African Company of Merchants signed a treaty of friendship that recognised Asante claims to sovereignty over large areas of the coast and its peoples. The assets of the African Company of Merchants consisted primarily of nine trading posts or factories: Fort William, Fort James, Fort Sekondi, Fort Winneba, Fort Apollonia, Fort Tantumquery, Fort Metal Cross, Fort Komenda, and Cape Coast Castle, the last of which was the administrative centre.

The coastal people, primarily some of the Fante and the inhabitants of the new town of Accra, who were chiefly Ga, came to rely on British protection against Asante incursions. But the merchant companies had limited ability to provide such security. The British Crown dissolved the company in 1821, giving authority over British forts on the Gold Coast to Charles MacCarthy, governor of the colony of Sierra Leone. The British forts and Sierra Leone remained under common administration for the first half of the century. MacCarthy's mandate was to impose peace and to end the slave trade. He sought to do this by encouraging the coastal peoples to oppose Kumasi rule and by closing the great roads to the coast. Incidents and sporadic warfare continued, however. In 1824, MacCarthy was killed and most of his force was wiped out in a battle with Asante forces. The British were able to defeat an Asante invasion of the coast in 1826 with a combined force of British and local forces, including the Fante and the people of Accra.

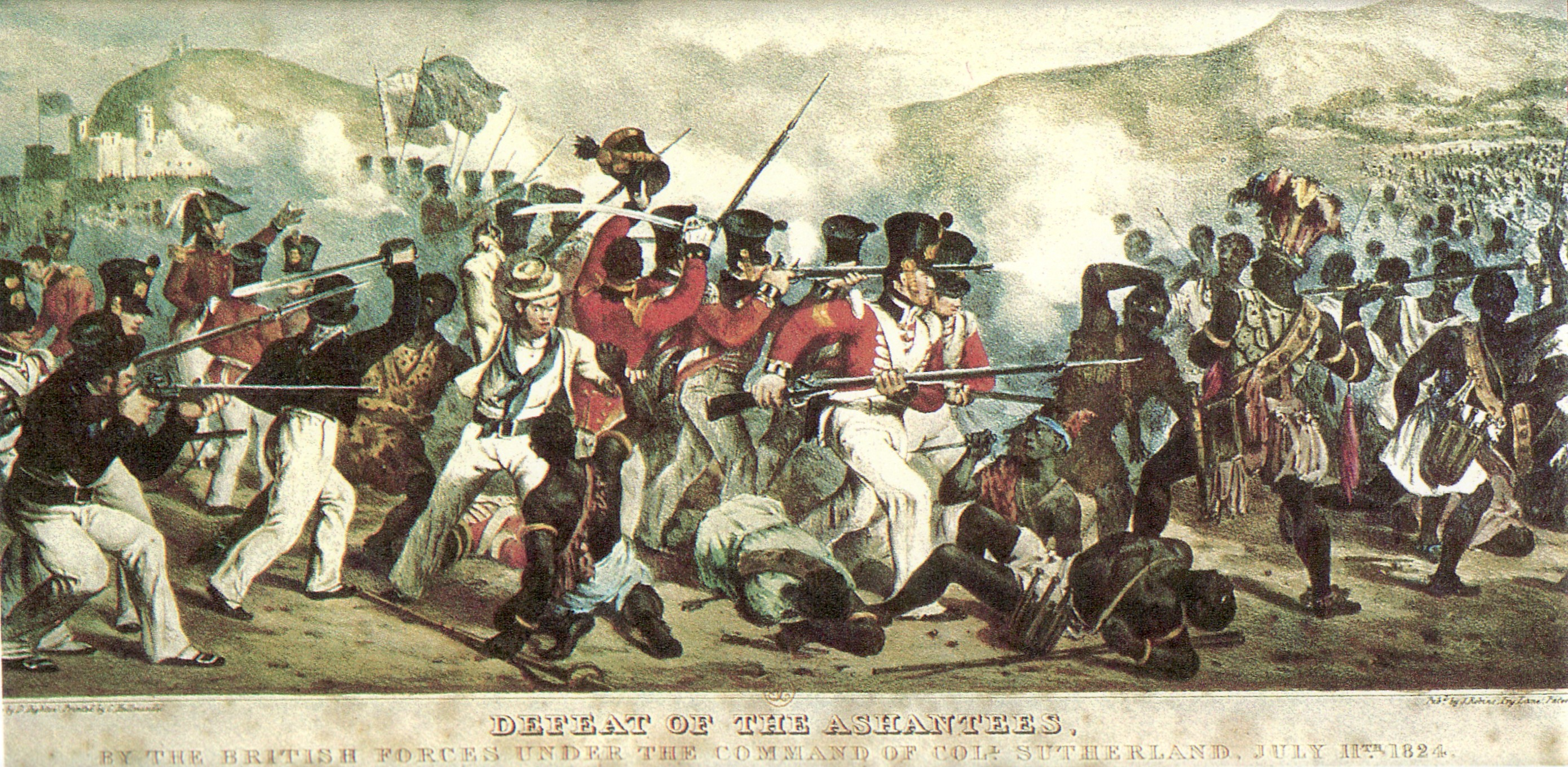
The First Anglo-Ashanti War

When the British government allowed control of the Gold Coast settlements to revert to the British African Company of Merchants in the late 1820s, relations with Asante were still problematic. From the Asante point of view, the British had failed to control the activities of their local coastal allies. Had this been done, Asante might not have found it necessary to attempt to impose peace on the coastal peoples. MacCarthy's encouragement of coastal opposition to Asante and the subsequent 1824 British military attack further indicated to Asante leaders that the Europeans, especially the British, did not respect Asante.

In 1830, a London committee of merchants chose Captain George Maclean to become president of a local council of merchants. Although his formal jurisdiction was limited, Maclean's achievements were substantial; for example, he arranged a peace treaty with Asante in 1831. Maclean also supervised the coastal people by holding regular court in Cape Coast, where he sentenced and punished those found guilty of disturbing the peace. Between 1830 and 1843, while Maclean was in charge of affairs on the Gold Coast, no confrontations occurred with Asante. The volume of trade reportedly increased threefold.

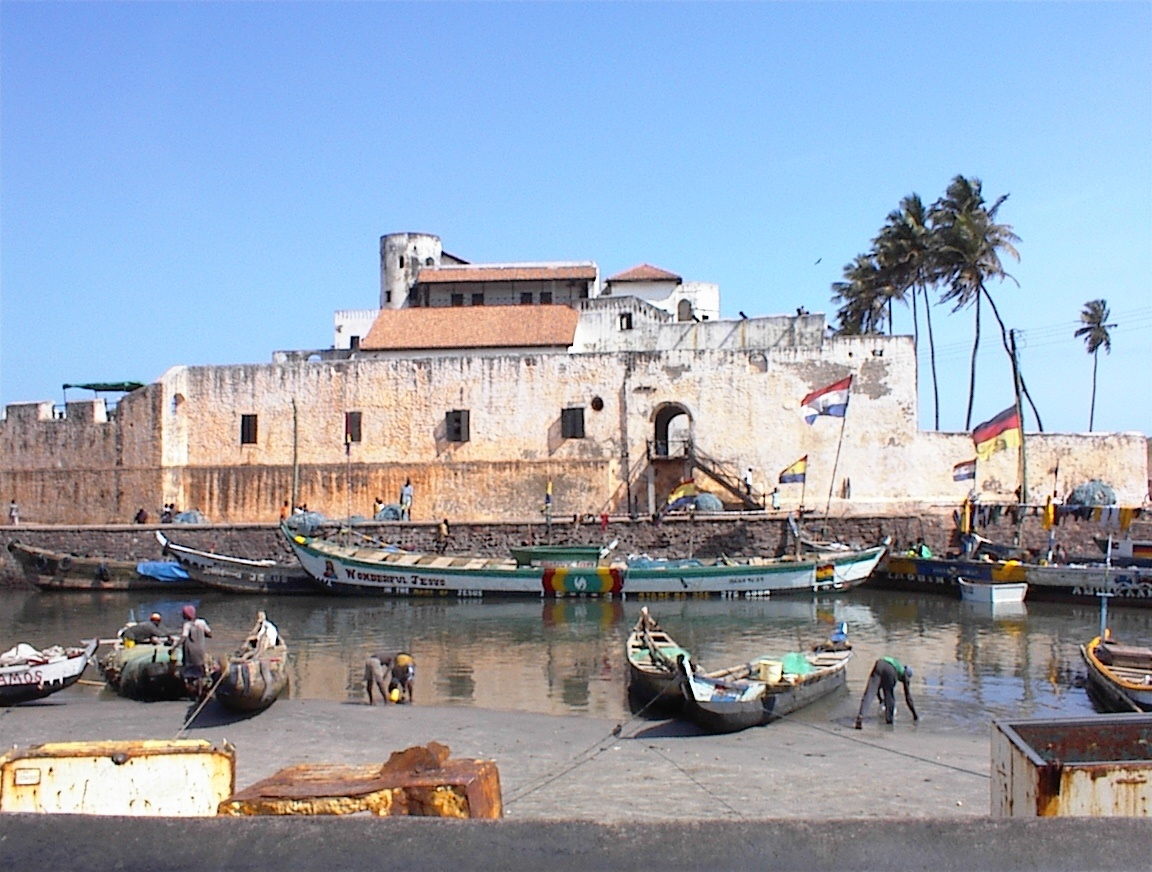
The Portuguese-built Elmina Castle was purchased by Britain in 1873. Also known as St. George Castle, it is now a World Heritage Site

Maclean's exercise of limited judicial power on the coast was so effective that a parliamentary committee recommended that the British government permanently administer its settlements and negotiate treaties with the coastal chiefs to define Britain's relations with them. The government did so in 1843, the same year crown government was reinstated. Commander Henry Worsley Hill was appointed first governor of the Gold Coast. Under Maclean's administration, several coastal tribes had submitted voluntarily to British protection. Hill proceeded to define the conditions and responsibilities of his jurisdiction over the protected areas. He negotiated a special treaty with a number of Fante and other local chiefs that became known as the Bond of 1844. This document obliged local leaders to submit serious crimes, such as murder and robbery, to British jurisdiction; it laid the legal foundation for subsequent British colonisation of the coastal area.

Additional coastal states as well as other states farther inland eventually signed the bond, and British influence was accepted, strengthened, and expanded. Under the terms of the 1844 arrangement, the British appeared to provide security to the coastal areas; thus, an informal protectorate came into being. As responsibilities for defending local allies and managing the affairs of the coastal protectorate increased, the administration of the Gold Coast was separated from Sierra Leone in 1850.

At about the same time, growing acceptance of the advantages offered by the British presence led to the initiation of another important step. In April 1852, local chiefs and elders met at Cape Coast to consult with the governor on means of raising revenue. With the governor's approval, the council of chiefs constituted itself as a legislative assembly. In approving its resolutions, the governor indicated that the assembly of chiefs should become a permanent fixture of the protectorate's constitutional machinery, but the assembly was given no specific constitutional authority to pass laws or to levy taxes without the consent of the people.

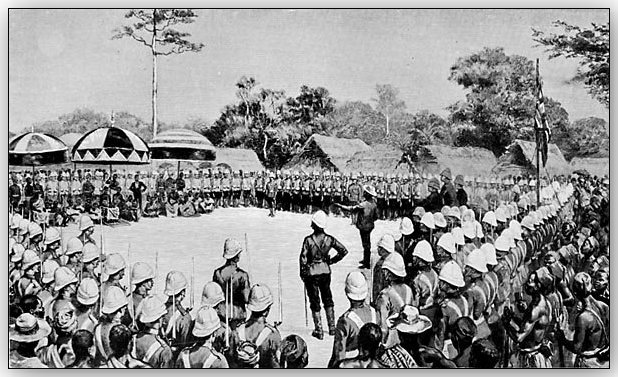
Following the Fourth Anglo-Ashanti War in 1896, the British proclaimed a protectorate over the Ashanti Kingdom.

In 1872, British influence over the Gold Coast increased further when Britain purchased the Dutch Gold Coast. The Asante, who for years had considered the Dutch at Elmina as their allies, thereby lost their last trade outlet to the sea. To prevent this loss and to ensure that revenue received from that post continued, the Asante staged their last invasion of the coast in 1873. After early successes, they finally came up against well-trained British forces who compelled them to retreat beyond the Pra River. Later attempts to negotiate a settlement with the British were rejected by the commander of their forces, Major General Sir Garnet Wolseley. To settle the Asante problem permanently, the British invaded Asante with a sizeable military force. The attack, launched in January 1874 by 2,500 British soldiers and large numbers of African auxiliaries, resulted in the occupation and burning of Kumasi, the Asante capital.

The subsequent peace treaty required the Asante to renounce any claim to many southern territories. The Asante also had to keep the road to Kumasi open to trade. From this point on, Asante power steadily declined. The confederation slowly disintegrated as subject territories broke away and as protected regions defected to British rule. Enforcement of the treaty led to recurring difficulties and outbreaks of fighting. In 1896, the British dispatched another expedition that occupied Kumasi and forced Asante to become a protectorate of the British Crown. The British abolished the position of asantehene and exiled the incumbent from the colony.

The core of the Asante federation accepted these terms grudgingly. In 1900, the Asante rebelled in the War of the Golden Stool but were defeated the next year. In 1902, the British proclaimed Asante a colony under the jurisdiction of the governor of the Gold Coast. The annexation was made with misgivings and recriminations on both sides. With Asante subdued and annexed, British colonisation of the region became a reality.

The British finally succeeded in their earlier plans to abolish slavery and slave trade. In 1874, the British declared that all children born to slaves in the Gold Coast Protectorate after 1 January 1875 were born free, thereby introducing a gradual abolition of slavery in line with their policy in India. The British followed up these reforms by banning debt bondage and enslavement by pawning. However, the British did not enforce these laws, since the indigenous economy was dependent on slave labor and there was little opportunity for wage labor for former slaves; consequently, most slaves were never made aware of the anti-slavery laws, and slave owning and open slave dealing was tolerated until the British officials finally started to enforce the laws in 1911. When the Kingdom of Ashanti was conquered by the British in 1896, the British assured the chiefs that they would be allowed to keep their slaves; Asante became a colony in 1901 and in 1902 it was made illegal to "compel or attempt to compel the services" of another person, but slavery was not explicitly abolished due to British fear that an abolition would cause "internal disorganization"; chattel slavery was formally banned in 1908, but the British authorities did not enforce the law until the 1920s.

=== Colonialism ===
Military confrontations between Asante and the Fante contributed to the growth of British influence on the Gold Coast. It was concern about Asante activities on the coast that had compelled the Fante states to sign the Bond of 1844. In theory, the bond allowed the British quite limited judicial powers—the trying of murder and robbery cases only. Also, the British could not acquire further judicial rights without the consent of the kings, chiefs, and people of the protectorate. In practice, however, British efforts to usurp more and more judicial authority were so successful that in the 1850s they considered establishing European courts in place of traditional African ones.

As a result of the exercise of ever-expanding judicial powers on the coast and also to ensure that the coastal peoples remained firmly under control, the British, following their defeat of Asante in 1874, proclaimed the former coastal protectorate a crown colony. The Gold Coast Colony, established on 24 July 1874, comprised the coastal areas and extended inland as far as the ill-defined borders of Asante.

The coastal peoples did not greet this move with enthusiasm. They were not consulted about this annexation, which arbitrarily set aside the Bond of 1844 and treated its signatories like conquered territories. The British, however, made no claim to any rights to the land, a circumstance that probably explains the absence of popular resistance. Shortly after declaring the coastal area a colony, the British moved the colonial capital from Cape Coast to the former Danish castle at Christiansborg in Accra.

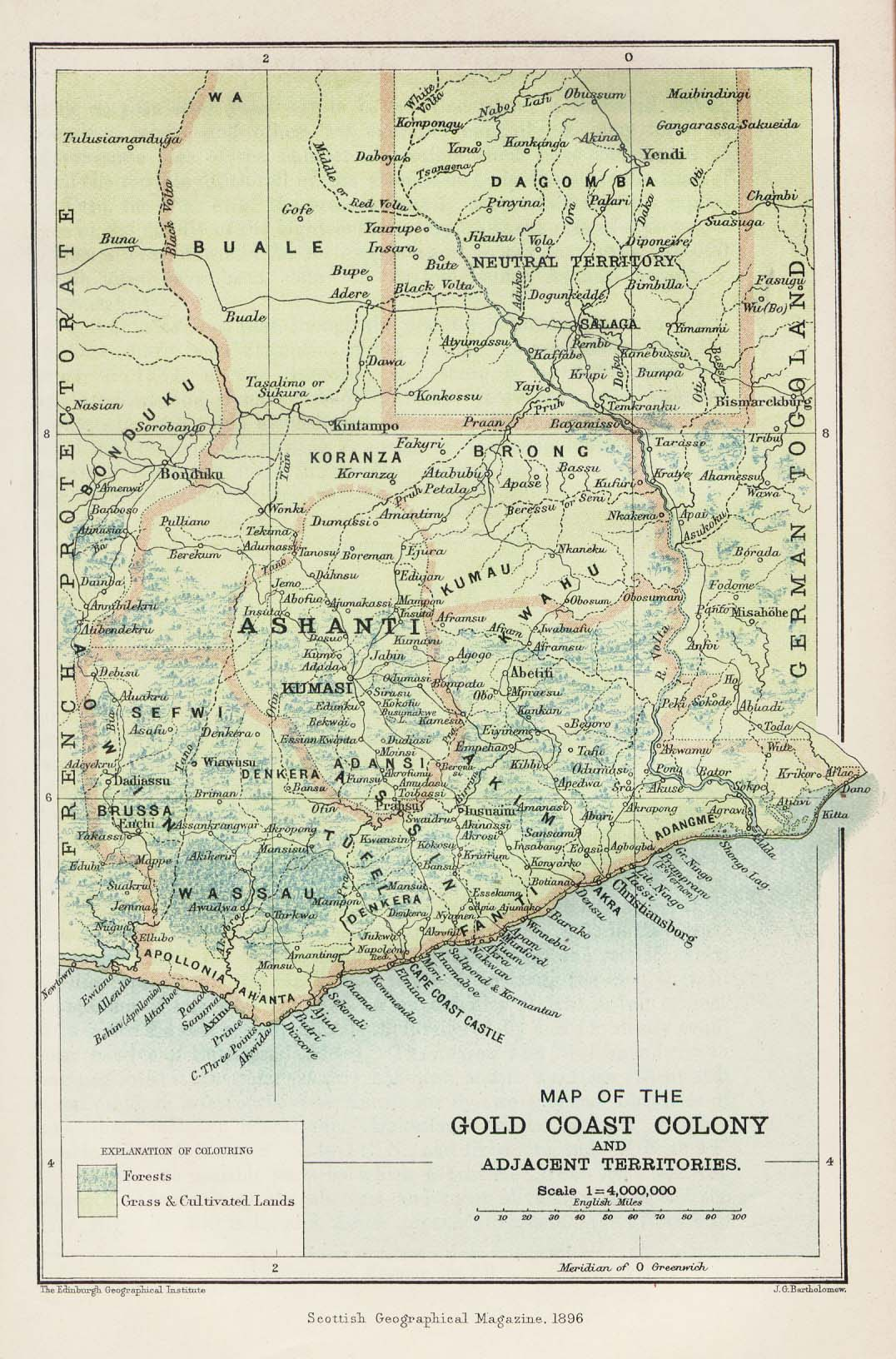
Map from 1896 of the British Gold Coast Colony

Map of the Gold Coast Colony, the Ashanti Colony, the Northern Territories and the mandate territory of British Togoland

The British sphere of influence was eventually extended to include Asante. Following the defeat of Asante in 1896, the British proclaimed a protectorate over the kingdom. Once the asantehene and his council had been exiled, the British appointed a resident commissioner to Asante, who was given both civil and criminal jurisdiction over the territories. Each Asante state was administered from Kumasi as a separate entity and was ultimately responsible to the governor of the Gold Coast. As noted above, Asante became a colony following its final defeat in 1901.

In the meantime, the British became interested in the broad areas north of Asante, known generally as the Northern Territories. This interest was prompted primarily by the need to forestall the French and the Germans, who had been making rapid advances in the surrounding areas. British officials had first penetrated the area in the 1880s, and after 1896 protection was extended to northern areas whose trade with the coast had been controlled by Asante. In 1898 and 1899, European colonial powers amicably demarcated the boundaries between the Northern Territories and the surrounding French and German colonies. The Northern Territories were proclaimed a British protectorate in 1902.

Like the Asante protectorate, the Northern Territories were placed under the authority of a resident commissioner who was responsible to the governor of the Gold Coast. The governor ruled both Asante and the Northern Territories by proclamations until 1946.

With the north under British control, the three territories of the Gold Coast—the Colony (the coastal regions), Asante, and the Northern Territories—became, for all practical purposes, a single political unit, or crown colony, known as "the dependency" or simply as the Gold Coast. The borders of present-day Ghana were realised in May 1956 when the people of the Volta region, known as British Mandated Togoland, voted in a plebiscite to become part of modern Ghana.

==== Colonial administration ====
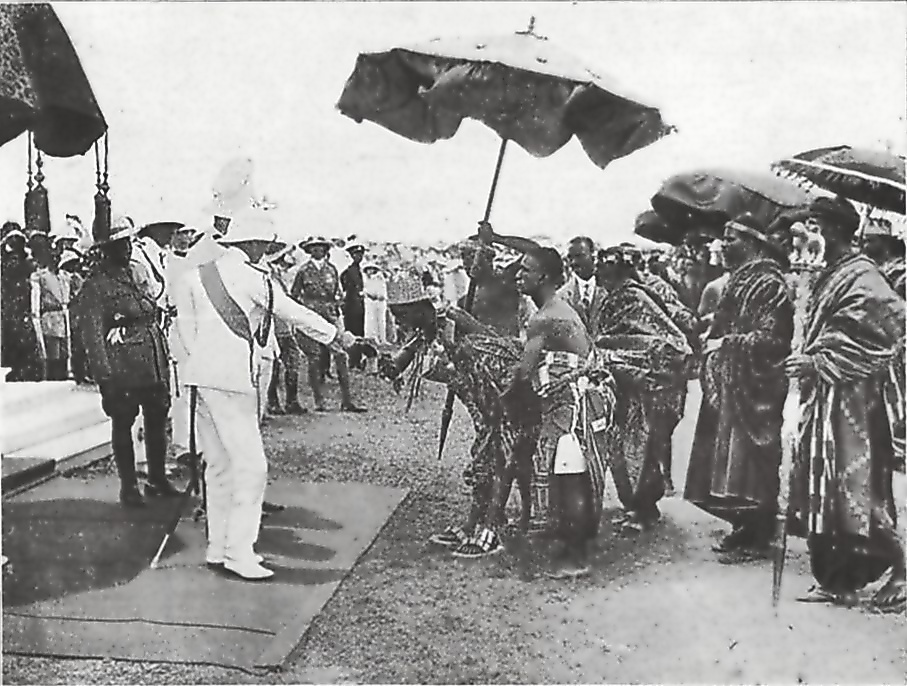
Visit of the Prince of Wales to the Gold Coast Colony in 1925, meeting Nana Kwasi Akuffo I, Akuapemhene

Beginning in 1850, the coastal regions increasingly came under control of the governor of the British fortresses, who was assisted by the Executive Council and the Legislative Council. The Executive Council was a small advisory body of European officials that recommended laws and voted taxes, subject to the governor's approval. The Legislative Council included the members of the Executive Council and unofficial members initially chosen from British commercial interests. After 1900 three chiefs and three other Africans were added to the Legislative Council, these being chosen from the Europeanized communities of Accra, Cape Coast, and Sekondi. The inclusion of Africans from Asante and the Northern Territories did not take place until much later. Prior to 1925, all members of the Legislative Council were appointed by the governor. Official members always outnumbered unofficial members.

The gradual emergence of centralised colonial government brought about unified control over local services, although the actual administration of these services was still delegated to local authorities. Specific duties and responsibilities came to be clearly delineated, and the role of traditional states in local administration was also clarified.

The structure of local government had its roots in traditional patterns of government. Village councils of chiefs and elders were almost exclusively responsible for the immediate needs of individual localities, including traditional law and order and the general welfare. The councils, however, ruled by consent rather than by right. Chiefs were chosen by the ruling class of the society; a traditional leader continued to rule not only because he was the choice of what may be termed the nobility, but also because he was accepted by his people. The unseating or destooling of a chief by tribal elders was a fairly common practice if the chief failed to meet the desires or expectations of the community.

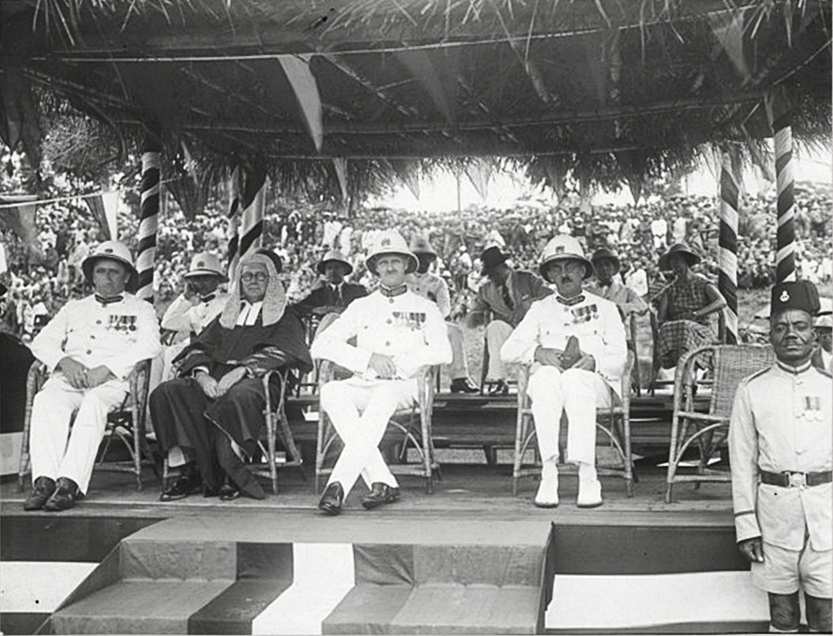
British colonial officers in Kumasi, 1937

Traditional chiefs figured prominently in the system of indirect rule adopted by British authorities to administer their colonies in Africa. According to Frederick Lugard, architect of the policy, indirect rule was cost effective because it reduced the number of European officials in the field. By allowing local rulers to exercise direct administrative control over their people, opposition to European rule from the local population would be minimised. The chiefs, however, were to take instructions from their European supervisors. The plan, according to Lugard, had the further advantage of civilising the natives, because it exposed traditional rulers to the benefits of European political organisation and values. This "civilizing" process notwithstanding, indirect rule had the ultimate advantage of guaranteeing the maintenance of law and order.

The application of indirect rule in the Gold Coast became essential, especially after Asante and the Northern Territories were brought under British rule. Before the effective colonisation of these territories, the intention of the British was to use both force and agreements to control chiefs in Asante and the north. Once indirect rule was implemented, the chiefs became responsible to the colonial authorities who supported them. In many respects, therefore, the power of each chief was greatly enhanced. Although Lugard pointed to the civilising influence of indirect rule, critics of the policy argued that the element of popular participation was removed from the traditional political system. Despite the theoretical argument in favour of decentralisation, indirect rule in practice caused chiefs to look to Accra (the capital) rather than to their people for all decisions.

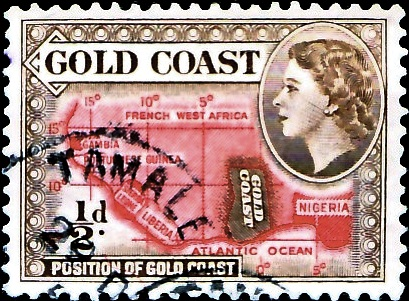
Postage stamp with a portrait of Queen Elizabeth II, 1953

Many chiefs and elders came to regard themselves as a ruling aristocracy. Their councils were generally led by government commissioners, who often rewarded the chiefs with honours, decorations, and knighthoods. Indirect rule tended to preserve traditional forms and sources of power, however, and it failed to provide meaningful opportunities for the growing number of educated young men anxious to find a niche in their country's development. Other groups were dissatisfied because there was not sufficient co-operation between the councils and the central government and because some felt that the local authorities were too dominated by the British district commissioners.

In 1925, provincial councils of chiefs were established in all three territories of the colony, partly to give the chiefs a colony-wide function. This move was followed in 1927 by the promulgation of the Native Administration Ordinance, which replaced an 1883 arrangement that had placed chiefs in the Gold Coast Colony under British supervision. The purpose was to clarify and to regulate the powers and areas of jurisdiction of chiefs and councils. Councils were given specific responsibilities over disputed elections and the unseating of chiefs; the procedure for the election of chiefs was set forth; and judicial powers were defined and delegated. Councils were entrusted with the role of defining customary law in their areas (the government had to approve their decisions), and the provincial councils were empowered to become tribunals to decide matters of customary law when the dispute lay between chiefs in different hierarchies. Until 1939, when the Native Treasuries Ordinance was passed, however, there was no provision for local budgets. In 1935, the Native Authorities Ordinance combined the central colonial government and the local authorities into a single governing system. New native authorities, appointed by the governor, were given wide powers of local government under the supervision of the central government's provincial commissioners, who assured that their policies would be those of the central government.

In 1948, native Ghanaians decided to fight for their independence.

The provincial councils and moves to strengthen them were not popular. Even by British standards, the chiefs were not given enough power to be effective instruments of indirect rule. Some Ghanaians believed that the reforms, by increasing the power of the chiefs at the expense of local initiative, permitted the colonial government to avoid movement toward any form of popular participation in the colony's government.

==== Economic and social development in the British colony ====
The years of British administration of the Gold Coast during the 20th century were an era of significant progress in social, economic, and educational development. Communications were greatly improved. For example, the Sekondi-Tarkwa railroad, begun in 1898, was extended until it connected most of the important commercial centres of the south, and by 1937, there were 9,700 kilometres of roads. Telecommunication and postal services were initiated as well.

New crops were also introduced and gained widespread acceptance. Cacao trees, introduced in 1878, brought the first cash crop to the farmers of the interior; it became the mainstay of the nation's economy in the 1920s when disease wiped out Brazil's trees. The production of cocoa was largely in the hands of Africans. The Cocoa Marketing Board was created in 1947 to assist farmers and to stabilise the production and sale of their crop. By the end of that decade, the Gold Coast was exporting more than half of the world's cocoa supply.

The colony's earnings increased further from the export of timber and gold. Gold, which initially brought Europeans to the Gold Coast, remained in the hands of Africans until the 1890s. Traditional techniques of panning and shaft mining, however, yielded only limited output. The development of modern modes of extracting minerals made gold mining an exclusively foreign-run enterprise. For example, the Ashanti Goldfields Corporation, which was organised in 1897, gained a concession of about 160 square kilometres in which to prospect commercially for gold. Although certain tribal authorities profited greatly from the granting of mining concessions, it was the European mining companies and the colonial government that accumulated much of the wealth. Revenue from export of the colony's natural resources financed internal improvements in infrastructure and social services. The foundation of an educational system more advanced than any other else in West Africa also resulted from mineral export revenue.

Many of the economic and civil improvements in the Gold Coast in the early part of the current century have been attributed to Frederick Gordon Guggisberg, governor from 1919 to 1927. Born in Galt (near Toronto), Canada, Guggisberg joined the British army in 1889. During the first decade of the 20th century, he worked as a surveyor in the British colonies of the Gold Coast and Nigeria, and later, during World War I, he served in France.

At the beginning of his governorship of the Gold Coast, Guggisberg presented a 10-year development program to the Legislative Council. He suggested first the improvement of transportation. Then, in order of priority, his prescribed improvements included water supply, drainage, hydroelectric projects, public buildings, town improvements, schools, hospitals, prisons, communication lines, and other services. Guggisberg also set a goal of filling half of the colony's technical positions with Africans as soon as they could be trained. His program has been described as the most ambitious ever proposed in West Africa up to that time. Another of the governor's programs led to the development of an artificial harbour at Takoradi, which then became Ghana's first port. Achimota College, which developed into one of the nation's finest secondary schools, was also a Guggisberg idea.

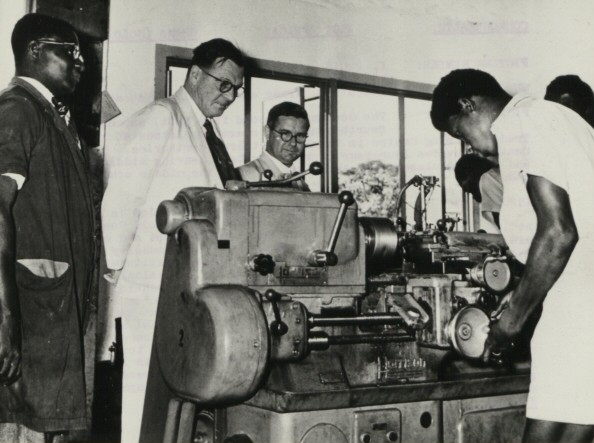
Lord Listowel watches fourth-year boys operating lathes at the Trade Training Centre in Tamale, Northern Territories. This Centre provided four-year courses for boys leaving middle schools and evening classes for those who go from the middle schools into industry.

When measuring the influence of living standard during the colonial period, the obvious constraint of a long-term perspective is the limited amount of proper data and a consistent measure of human well-being. The anthropometric methods provide a way to overcome the limitations, and reveal the evolution of the long run. Baten drew a long run trend that included the experience of the pre-colonial, colonial and post-independence era. The results indicate that for Ghana, the colonial period of the 20th century was not particularly bad. To be more precise the living standards improved rapidly in the first decade of 20th century when cocoa cultivation took off. In general, the performance of economy and living standard of colonial time shows a better record than the post-independence period. It was through British-style education that a new Ghanaian elite gained the means and the desire to strive for independence. During the colonial years, the country's educational institutions improved markedly. From beginnings in missionary schools, the early part of the 20th century saw significant advances in many fields, and, although the missions continued to participate, the government steadily increased its interest and support. In 1909, the government established a technical school and a teachers' training college at Accra; several other secondary schools were set up by the missions. The government steadily increased its financial backing for the growing number of both state and mission schools. In 1948, the country opened its first centre of higher learning, the University College.

The colony assisted Britain in both World War I and World War II. From 1914 to 1918, the Gold Coast Regiment served with distinction in battles against German forces in Cameroon and in the long East Africa campaign. In World War II, troops from the Gold Coast emerged with even greater prestige after outstanding service in such places as Ethiopia and Burma. In the ensuing years, however, postwar problems of inflation and instability severely hampered readjustment for returning veterans, who were in the forefront of growing discontent and unrest. Their war service and veterans' associations had broadened their horizons, making it difficult for them to return to the humble and circumscribed positions set aside for Africans by the colonial authorities.

=== Nationalism ===
As the country developed economically, the power gradually shifted from the hands of the governor and his officials into those of Ghanaians. The changes resulted from the gradual development of a strong spirit of nationalism and were to result eventually in independence. The development of national consciousness accelerated quickly after World War II, when, in addition to ex-servicemen, a substantial group of urban African workers and traders emerged to lend mass support to the aspirations of a small educated minority. Once the movement had begun, events moved rapidly—not always fast enough to satisfy the nationalist leaders, but still at a pace that surprised not only the colonial government but many of the more conservative African elements as well.

==== Early manifestations ====
As early as the latter part of the 19th century, a growing number of educated Africans increasingly found unacceptable an arbitrary political system that placed almost all power in the hands of the governor through his appointment of council members. In the 1890s, some members of the educated coastal elite organised themselves into the Aborigines' Rights Protection Society to protest a land bill that threatened traditional land tenure. This protest helped lay the foundation for political action that would ultimately lead to independence. In 1920, one of the African members of the Legislative Council, Joseph E. Casely-Hayford, convened the National Congress of British West Africa, which sent a delegation to London to urge the Colonial Office to consider the principle of elected representation. The group, which claimed to speak for all British West African colonies, represented the first expression of political solidarity between intellectuals and nationalists of the area. Even though the delegation was not received in London (on the grounds that it represented only the interests of a small group of urbanised Africans), its actions aroused considerable support among the African elite at home.

Notwithstanding their call for elected representation as opposed to a system whereby the governor appointed council members, these nationalists insisted that they were loyal to the British Crown and that they merely sought an extension of British political and social practices to Africans. Notable leaders included Africanus Horton, Jr.; J. M. Sarbah; and S. R. B. Attah-Ahoma. Such men gave the nationalist movement a distinctly elitist flavour that was to last until the late 1940s.

The constitution of 1925, promulgated by Gordon Guggisberg, created provincial councils of paramount chiefs for all but the northern provinces of the colony. These councils in turn elected six chiefs as unofficial members of the Legislative Council. Although the new constitution appeared to recognise African sentiments, Guggisberg was concerned primarily with protecting British interests. For example, he provided Africans with a limited voice in the central government; yet, by limiting nominations to chiefs, he drove a wedge between chiefs and their educated subjects. The intellectuals believed that the chiefs, in return for British support, had allowed the provincial councils to fall completely under control of the government. By the mid-1930s, however, a gradual rapprochement between chiefs and intellectuals had begun.

Agitation for more adequate representation continued. Newspapers owned and managed by Africans played a major part in provoking this discontent—six were being published in the 1930s. As a result of the call for broader representation, two more unofficial African members were added to the Executive Council in 1943. Changes in the Legislative Council, however, had to await a different political climate in London, which came about only with the postwar election of a British Labour Party government.

The new Gold Coast constitution of 1946 (also known as the Burns constitution after Sir Alan Burns, the governor of the time) was a bold document. For the first time, the concept of an official majority was abandoned. The Legislative Council was now composed of six ex officio members, six nominated members, and eighteen elected members. The 1946 constitution also admitted representatives from Asante into the council for the first time. Even with a Labour Party government in power, however, the British continued to view the colonies as a source of raw materials that were needed to strengthen their crippled economy. Change that would place real power in African hands was not a priority among British leaders until after rioting and looting in Accra and other towns and cities in early 1948 over issues of pensions for ex-servicemen, the dominant role of foreigners in the economy, the shortage of housing, and other economic and political grievances.

With elected members in a decisive majority, Ghana had reached a level of political maturity unequaled anywhere in colonial Africa. The constitution did not, however, grant full self-government. Executive power remained in the hands of the governor, to whom the Legislative Council was responsible. Hence, the constitution, although greeted with enthusiasm as a significant milestone, soon encountered trouble. World War II had just ended, and many Gold Coast veterans who had served in British overseas expeditions returned to a country beset with shortages, inflation, unemployment, and black-market practices. There veterans, along with discontented urban elements, formed a nucleus of malcontents ripe for disruptive action. They were now joined by farmers, who resented drastic governmental measures required to cut out diseased cacao trees to control an epidemic, and by many others who were unhappy that the end of the war had not been followed by economic improvements.

==== Politics of the independence movements ====
Although political organisations had existed in the British colony, the United Gold Coast Convention (UGCC) was the first nationalist movement with the aim of self-government "in the shortest possible time". Founded in August 1947 by educated Africans who included J. B. Danquah, G. A. Grant (known as Paa Grant), R. A. Awoonor-Williams, Eric Ato Nkrumah (all lawyers except for Grant, who was a wealthy businessman), and others, the leadership of the organisation called for the replacement of chiefs on the Legislative Council with educated persons. For these political leaders, traditional governance, exercised largely via indirect rule, was identified with colonial interests and the past. They believed that it was their responsibility to lead their country into a new age. They also demanded that, given their education, the colonial administration should respect them and accord them positions of responsibility. As one writer on the period reported, "The symbols of progress, science, freedom, youth, all became cues which the new leadership evoked and reinforced." In particular, the UGCC leadership criticised the government for its failure to solve the problems of unemployment, inflation, and the disturbances that had come to characterise the society at the end of the war. Throughout the late 1940s, the UGCC relentlessly petitioned colonial authorities with demands for constitutional reform as well an end to exploitative economic practices, becoming an influential force in the region due to articulating their local demands within a universalist ideological framework based on human rights.

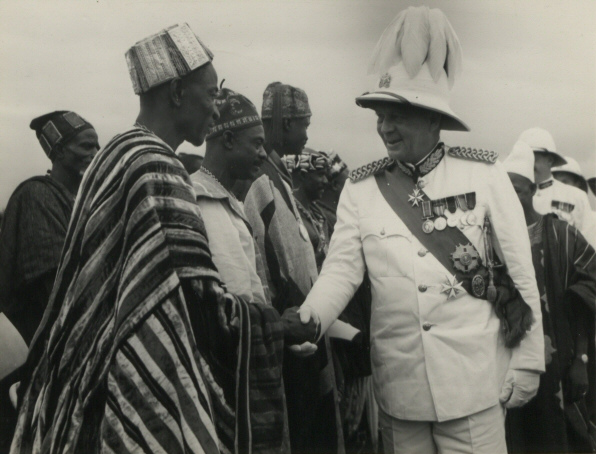
Charles Arden-Clarke, Governor of the Gold Coast, greets Chiefs of the Northern Territories, 1953

Their opposition to the colonial administration notwithstanding, UGCC members were conservative in the sense that their leadership did not seek drastic or revolutionary change. This was probably a result of their training in the British way of doing things. The manner in which politics were then conducted was to change after Kwame Nkrumah created his Convention People's Party (CPP) in June 1949.

Nkrumah was born at Nkroful in the Nzema area and educated in Catholic schools at Half Assini and at Achimota School. He received further training in the United States at Lincoln University and at the University of Pennsylvania. Later, in London, Nkrumah became active in the West African Students' Union and the Pan-African Congress. He was one of the few Africans who participated in the Fifth Pan-African Congress held in Manchester in 1945. During his time in Britain, Nkrumah came to know such outspoken anti-colonialists and intellectuals as the West Indian George Padmore, and the African-American W. E. B. Du Bois In 1947, when the UGCC was created in the Gold Coast to oppose colonial rule, Nkrumah was invited from London to become the movement's general secretary.

Nkrumah's tenure with the UGCC was a stormy one. In March 1948, he was arrested and detained with other leaders of the UGCC for political activism. They were known as the Big Six of Ghana Politics. Later, after the other members of the UGCC were invited to make recommendations to the Coussey Committee, which was advising the governor on the path to independence, Nkrumah broke with the UGCC and founded the CPP. Unlike the UGCC call for self-government "in the shortest possible time", Nkrumah and the CPP asked for "self-government now". The party leadership, made up of Nkrumah, Kojo Botsio, Komla A. Gbedemah, and a group of mostly young political professionals known as the "Verandah Boys", identified itself more with ordinary working people than with the UGCC and its intelligentsia.

Nkrumah's style and the promises he made appealed directly to the majority of workers, farmers, and youths who heard him; he seemed to be the national leader on whom they could focus their hopes. He also won the support of, among others, influential market women who, through their domination of small-scale trade, served as effective channels of communication at the local level.

The majority of the politicised population, stirred in the postwar years by outspoken newspapers, was separated from both the tribal chiefs and the Anglophile elite nearly as much as from the British by economic, social, and educational factors. This majority consisted primarily of ex-servicemen, literate persons who had some primary schooling, journalists, and elementary school teachers, all of whom had developed a taste for populist conceptions of democracy. A growing number of uneducated but urbanised industrial workers also formed part of the support group. Nkrumah was able to appeal to them on their own terms. By June 1949, when the CPP was formed with the avowed purpose of seeking immediate self-governance, Nkrumah had a mass following.

The constitution of 1951 resulted from the report of the Coussey Committee, created because of disturbances in Accra and other cities in 1948. In addition to giving the Executive Council a large majority of African ministers, it created an assembly, half the elected members of which were to come from the towns and rural districts and half from the traditional councils, including, for the first time, the Northern Territories. Although it was an enormous step forward, the new constitution still fell far short of the CPP's call for full self-government. Executive power remained in British hands, and the legislature was tailored to permit control by traditionalist interests.

With increasing popular backing, the CPP in early 1950 initiated a campaign of "positive action", intended to instigate widespread strikes and nonviolent resistance. When some violent disorders occurred, Nkrumah, along with his principal lieutenants, was promptly arrested and imprisoned for sedition. But this merely increased his prestige as leader and hero of the cause and gave him the status of martyr. In February 1951, the first elections were held for the Legislative Assembly under the new constitution. Nkrumah, still in jail, won a seat, and the CPP won an impressive victory with a two-thirds majority of the 104 seats.

The governor, Sir Charles Arden-Clarke, released Nkrumah and invited him to form a government as "leader of government business", a position similar to that of prime minister. Nkrumah accepted. A major milestone had been passed on the road to independence and self-government. Nonetheless, although the CPP agreed to work within the new constitutional order, the structure of government that existed in 1951 was certainly not what the CPP preferred. The ministries of defence, external affairs, finance, and justice were still controlled by British officials who were not responsible to the legislature. Also, by providing for a sizeable representation of traditional tribal chiefs in the Legislative Assembly, the constitution accentuated the cleavage between the modern political leaders and the traditional authorities of the councils of chiefs.

The start of Nkrumah's first term as "leader of government business" was marked by cordiality and co-operation with the British governor. During the next few years, the government was gradually transformed into a full parliamentary system. The changes were opposed by the more traditionalist African elements, particularly in Asante and the Northern Territories. This opposition, however, proved ineffective in the face of continuing and growing popular support for a single over-riding concept—independence at an early date.

In 1952, the position of prime minister was created and the Executive Council became the cabinet. The prime minister was made responsible to the assembly, which duly elected Nkrumah prime minister. The constitution of 1954 ended the election of assembly members by the tribal councils. The Legislative Assembly increased in size, and all members were chosen by direct election from equal, single-member constituencies. Only defence and foreign policy remained in the hands of the governor; the elected assembly was given control of virtually all internal affairs of the colony.

The CPP pursued a policy of political centralisation, which encountered serious opposition. Shortly after the 1954 election, a new party, the Asante-based National Liberation Movement (NLM), was formed. The NLM advocated a federal form of government, with increased powers for the various regions. NLM leaders criticised the CPP for perceived dictatorial tendencies. The new party worked in co-operation with another regionalist group, the Northern People's Party. When these two regional parties walked out of discussions on a new constitution, the CPP feared that London might consider such disunity an indication that the colony was not yet ready for the next phase of self-government.

The British constitutional adviser, however, backed the CPP position. The governor dissolved the assembly to test popular support for the CPP demand for immediate independence. The Crown agreed to grant independence if so requested by a two-thirds majority of the new legislature. New elections were held in July 1956. In keenly contested elections, the CPP won 57 per cent of the votes cast, but the fragmentation of the opposition gave the CPP every seat in the south as well as enough seats in Asante, the Northern Territories, and the Trans-Volta Region to hold a two-thirds majority of the 104 seats.

Prior to the July 1956 general elections in the Gold Coast, a plebiscite was conducted under United Nations (UN) auspices to decide the future disposition of British Togoland and French Togoland. The British trusteeship, the western portion of the former German colony, had been linked to the Gold Coast since 1919 and was represented in its parliament. A clear majority of British Togoland inhabitants voted in favour of union with their western neighbours, and the area was absorbed into the Gold Coast. There was, however, vocal opposition to the incorporation from some of the Ewe in southern British Togoland.

=== Independence ===
On 6 March 1957, the Colony of Gold Coast gained independence as the state of Ghana.

== See also ==
- Anglo-Ashanti wars
- Gold Coast ackey
- Gold Coast Influenza Epidemic
- List of governors of the Gold Coast
- Slave Coast of West Africa
