= Gordon Guggisberg =

British Army officer and colonial administrator (1869–1930)

Brigadier-General Sir Gordon Guggisberg KCMG DSO
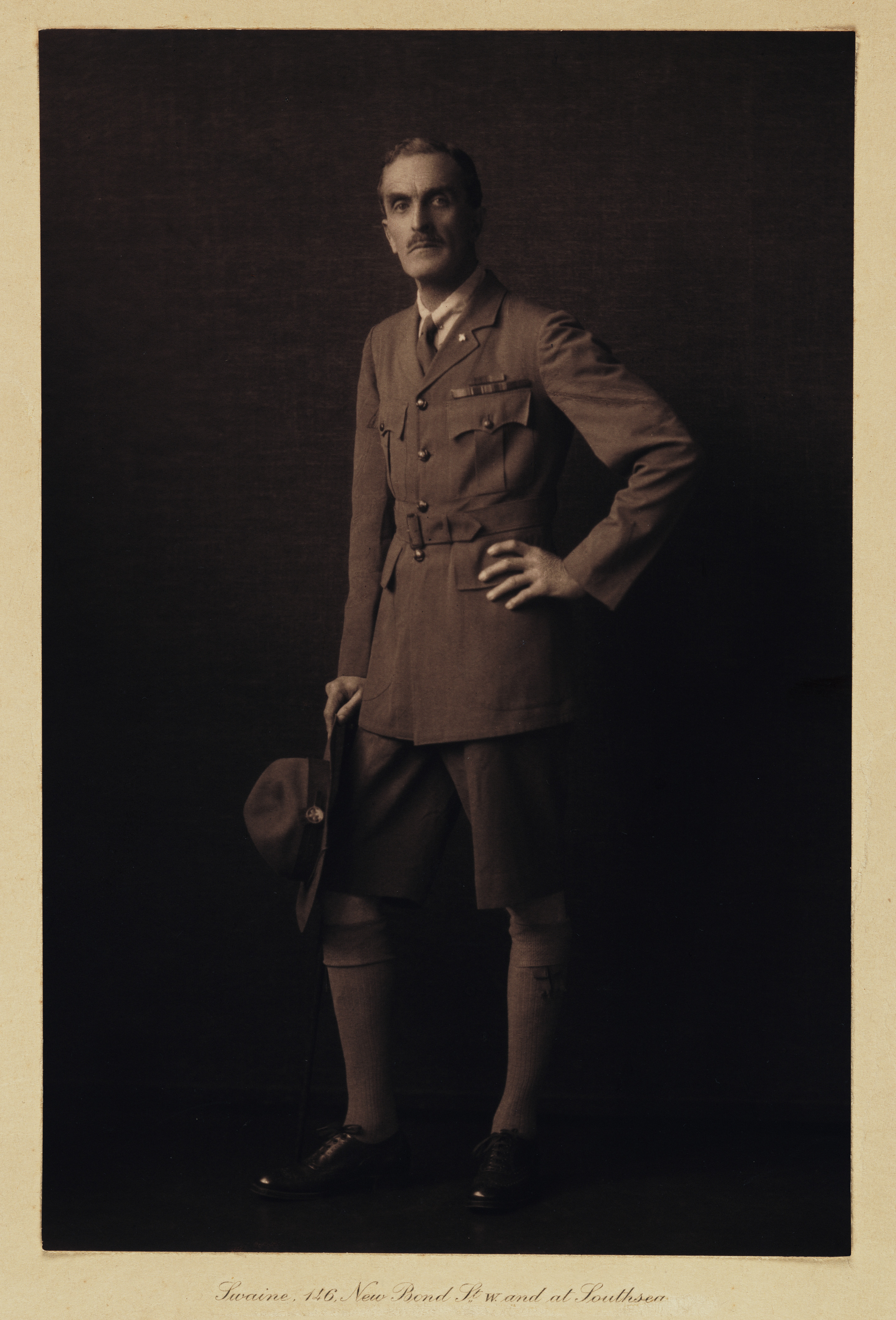
- Guggisberg in c. 1922
- Born: 20 July 1869; Galt, Ontario, Canada
- Died: 21 April 1930 (aged 60) Bexhill-on-Sea, East Sussex, England
- Allegiance: United Kingdom
- Branch: British Army
- Service years: 1889–1929
- Rank: Brigadier-General
- Commands: 94th Field Company, Royal Engineers; 170th (2/1st North Lancashire) Brigade; 100th Brigade
- Conflicts: First World War
- Awards: Knight Commander of the Order of St Michael and St George; Distinguished Service Order; Chevalier of the Legion of Honour
- Spouses: Ethel Emily Hamilton Way, m. 1895, div. 1904; Decima Moore, m. 1905–his death

Brigadier-General Sir Frederick Gordon Guggisberg, KCMG, DSO (20 July 1869 – 21 April 1930) was a senior Canadian-born British Army officer and British Empire colonial administrator. He published a number of works on military topics and Africa.

== Early life ==
Guggisberg was born in Galt, Ontario, Canada. He was the grandson of Samuel Guggisberg, a cabinetmaker and farmer who had emigrated from Uetendorf in the Canton of Bern in Switzerland in 1832. He was the eldest son born to merchant Frederick Guggisberg and his wife Dora Louisa Willson.

After moving to England in 1879, Guggisberg was educated at Burney's School, Portsmouth, and the Royal Military Academy, Woolwich. He was commissioned a second lieutenant in the Royal Engineers in 1889 and promoted to lieutenant in 1892. He served in Singapore from 1893 to 1896. He became instructor in fortification at Woolwich in January 1897, where he reformed the methods and syllabus of instruction. He was promoted to captain in 1900, the year he published The Shop: The Story of the Royal Military Academy. In 1903 he published Modern Warfare under the pseudonym "Ubique".

== Career and later life ==
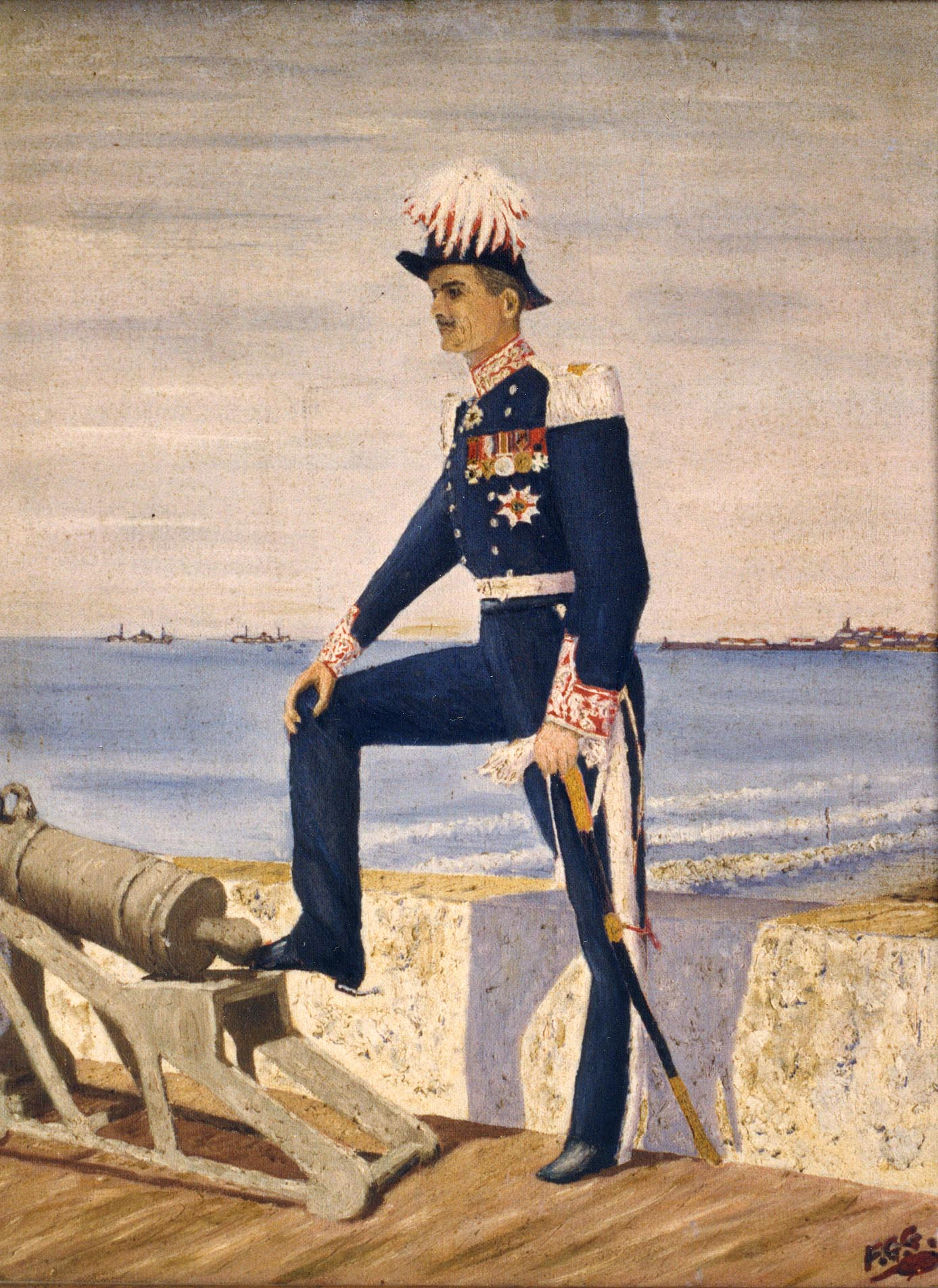
Sir Frederick Gordon Guggisberg self-portrait, 1922

In September 1902 Guggisberg was employed by the Colonial Office on a special survey of the Gold Coast Colony and Ashanti, and in 1905 was appointed director of surveys in that colony. In 1908 he returned to Chatham for regimental work, but in 1910 was appointed director of survey in Southern Nigeria.

While in Nigeria he compiled The Handbook of the Southern Nigeria Survey (1911) for the guidance of his assistants. Of this work the director-general of the ordnance survey wrote:

"The duties of all members of the staff were strictly defined and, in particular, sensible rules were laid down as to the relations of the staff with the civil administration. Much attention was paid to the treatment of villagers; unpaid labour was forbidden; all goods bought were to be paid for at the recognized rate, and great care was to be exercised not to damage the crops.... They were model instructions and the survey of Nigeria was a model survey."

Following the union of the Southern Nigeria Protectorate and the Northern Nigeria Protectorate in 1913, Guggisberg was appointed surveyor-general of Nigeria. In 1914 he was appointed director of public works in the Gold Coast, but he rejoined the army upon the outbreak of the First World War. He commanded the 94th Field Company, Royal Engineers, from 1915 to 1916, and was Commander, Royal Engineers, (CRE) of the 8th Divisional Engineers during the Battle of the Somme (July 1916), and of the 66th (2nd East Lancashire) Divisional Engineers from November 1916 to May 1917. He was brigadier-general commanding the 170th (2/1st North Lancashire) Brigade 1917–1918, assistant-inspector-general of training, general headquarters, France, in 1918; and in command of the 100th Brigade in 1918. He was mentioned in dispatches five times, and was awarded the Distinguished Service Order in 1918.

In 1919, Guggisberg was appointed Governor of the Gold Coast. There he undertook work to develop and extend the railways, and created the deep-water harbour of Takoradi, superseding the use of surf-boats for handling traffic. In 1923 he commissioned the construction of Accra's Korle-Bu Teaching Hospital, the most modern institution of its kind in colonial Africa at the time. During his time in the Gold Coast, as during his time in Nigeria, Guggisberg took the advice of the geologist Albert Ernest Kitson, who took a keen interest in developing local infrastructures.

Close association with native Africans during his survey work convinced Guggisberg that the African races and Muslims of the Middle East and Asia were capable of eventually attaining the development levels of modern Europe. Toward the close of his life he wrote: "My practical experience... during the last twenty-seven years has convinced me that what individuals have achieved, in spite of ill-selected systems of education, can be achieved by the race generally, provided we alter our educational methods." In order to carry out that purpose he founded Achimota College for the training of native teachers and instructors. It was later to become the largest establishment for the education of native Africans.

The aim of Guggisberg's policy was the development of the country by and for the natives rather than for the benefit of European capitalists. In 1928 he was appointed governor and commander-in-chief of British Guiana, but owing to failing health he was obliged to leave the colony in 1929, and soon afterwards resigned the appointment. He introduced drastic administrative reforms and devoted himself to the problems of maintaining and improving the system of drainage and irrigation upon which the sugar and rice cultivation of the colony depended. He also promoted immigration and peasant settlement and the development of the production and marketing of rice. These activities were cut short by his illness and resignation in 1929. He died in 1930 at Bexhill-on-Sea, Sussex, at the age of 60.

During his last illness Guggisberg addressed a letter to his personal friends setting forth the aims which he had had in view in his administrative work in British Guiana, his confidence in divine guidance and in the spirit of Christianity, and his hope of being able to return to Africa "to try to do some more work for the African races.... As you know," he concluded, "my heart is in Africa, and I believe that away from the trammels of the Colonial Office, there is opportunity for me to do something useful both for the Empire and for the natives of Africa."

== Honours and family ==
Guggisberg was tall and athletic. He was for some years captain of the Royal Engineers' cricket eleven and played a first-class cricket match for the Marylebone Cricket Club in 1905. He was also a fine player of polo, racquets, golf, and football. He was created a Companion of the Order of St Michael and St George in 1908 and a Knight Commander in the same Order in 1922. He was made a Chevalier of the Legion of Honour in 1917.

Guggisberg married twice:

- On 20 September 1895 in Trichinopoly, Madras Presidency, India, he married Ethel Emily Hamilton Way, daughter of Colonel Wilfred FitzAlan Way of the Northumberland Fusiliers, whom he divorced in 1904 and by whom he had three daughters.
- On 15 August 1905 in Staines to (Lilian) Decima Moore, the actress, daughter of Edward Henry Moore, of Brighton, county analyst. She accompanied him on his survey journeys, and their joint book, We Two in West Africa (1909), is an account of their life as well as of a transitional phase in West African development.

In 1973 on the occasion of the 50th anniversary of the construction of Korle-Bu Teaching Hospital in Accra, the Ghanaian government honoured Guggisberg with the erection of a statue, a rare tribute paid by a post-colonial government to one of its colonial governors.

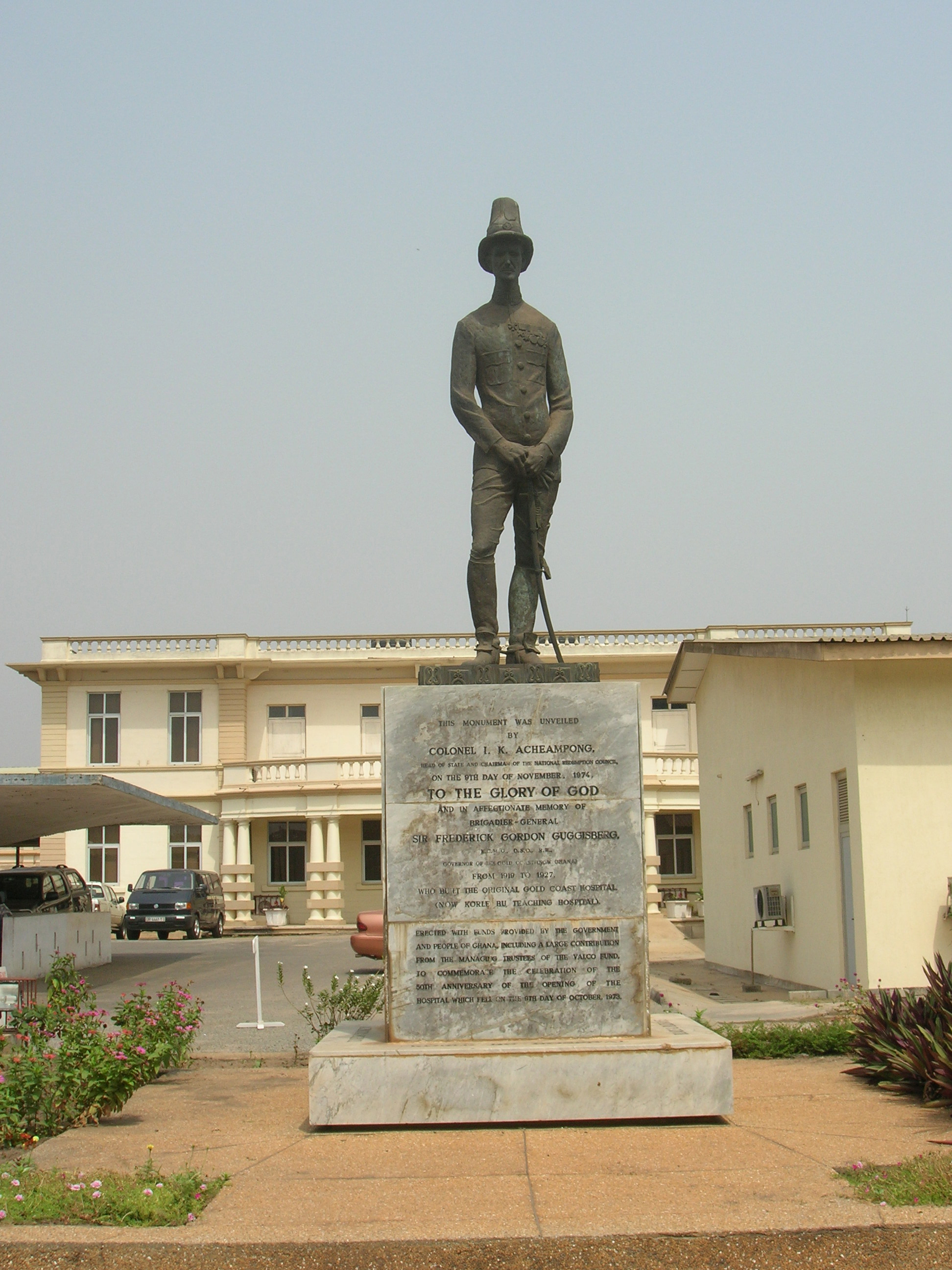
Guggisberg statue at Korle-Bu Hospital, Accra, inaugurated in 1974, on the 50th anniversary of the founding of the hospital

There are male dormitories named after Guggisberg at the Eastern compound of Achimota School in Accra, Ghana, Bagabaga College of Education in Tamale, Ghana, and Prempeh College in Kumasi, Ghana.

== Ethnic background and religious affiliation ==
Despite the occasional rumours about Guggisberg's background and religious faith being Jewish, it has been thoroughly documented that he was not. His family has long recorded ancestry in the farming village of Belp, going back to the early 16th century and before that in the neighboring hamlet of Niederhäusern, near the village of Zimmerwald, both in the Canton of Bern, going back even further, to the late 14th century and beyond. The family were adherents to the Evangelical Reformed National Church of Canton Bern (Evangelisch-Reformierte Landeskirche des Kantons Bern) since 1528, when Bern introduced the Protestant Reformation to all its territories, a faith Guggisberg's emigrant grandfather continued to follow throughout his lifetime while in Canada. Guggisberg himself, because of his mother, was baptized and raised in the Anglican denomination, a faith that he adhered to until his death.

== Books authored by Guggisberg ==
- Guggisberg, F. G., The Shop: The Story of the Royal Military Academy (1900)
- Guggisberg, F. G., Modern Warfare (1903)
- Guggisberg, F. G. and Decima (1909). We Two in West Africa. London: William Heinemann.
- Guggisberg, F. G., The Handbook of the Southern Nigeria Survey (1911)
- Guggisberg, F. G., and Fraser, A. G., The Future of the Negro (1929)

== Notes ==
Government offices
Preceded by Alexander Ransford Slater, acting	Governor of the Gold Coast; 1919–1927	Succeeded by James Crawford Maxwell, acting
Preceded by Sir Cecil Hunter-Rodwell	Governor of British Guiana; 1928–1930	Succeeded by Sir Edward Brandis Denham
