= Convention People's Party =

Political party in Ghana, formed in 1949

Convention People's Party Apam Nkorɔfo Kuw (Akan)
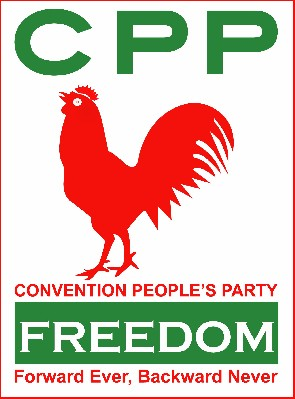
- Leader: Nana Akosua Frimpomaa Sarpong-Kumankumah (Disputed as of December 2023); National Executive Committee Interim Leadership (Disputed as of December 2023)
- Chairman: Nana Akosua Frimpomaa Sarpong-Kumankumah (Disputed as of December 2023)
- General Secretary: Nana Yaa Jantuah (Resigned in 2023)
- Founder: Kwame Nkrumah
- Founded: 12 June 1949 (original) 29 January 1996 (re-founded)
- Dissolved: 24 February 1966 (original)
- Split from: United Gold Coast Convention
- Headquarters: House No. 64, Mango Tree Avenue, Asylum Down, Accra
- Youth wing: Convention People's Party Youth League
- Membership (1965): ▲557,162
- Ideology: Nkrumaism; Pan-Africanism; African socialism African nationalism Left-wing nationalism Scientific socialism Anti-colonialism; Anti-imperialism
- Political position: Left-wing to far-left
- International affiliation: Socialist International (consultative)
- Colors: Red, white and green
- Slogan: "Forward ever, backward never"; "Ghana Must Work Again the CPP is emerging!"
- Parliament: 0 / 275
- Pan-African Parliament: 0 / 5

Election symbol
- Red cockerel on a white background

Party flag

Website
- conventionpeoplesparty.org

The Convention People's Party (CPP) is a socialist political party in Ghana based on the ideas of the first President of Ghana, Kwame Nkrumah. The CPP was formed in June 1949 after Nkrumah broke away from the United Gold Coast Convention (UGCC).

== History ==
=== Origins ===
The Convention People's Party is descended from a line of political movements formed in the early half of the 20th century to spearhead the anti-colonial struggle in the Gold Coast. The movement that preceded it was the United Gold Coast Convention (UGCC) formed in August 1947 and led predominantly by members of the professional and business classes. To expand its support base and step up the struggle for independence, the leadership of the UGCC decided to appoint a permanent general secretary to lead its expansion and step up the pace of change. Ebenezer Ako Adjei, then a young lawyer, was offered the paid secretaryship of the UGCC but he declined the position and instead proposed Kwame Nkrumah, a political activist then in London, for the position. Ako Adjei had known Nkrumah as a fellow at Lincoln University in the United States and at the London School of Economics. He was also the past President of the West African Students Union (WASU) in London which first hosted Nkrumah when he arrived in Britain from the United States.

The leadership of the UGCC accepted Ako Adjei's suggestion and agreed to invite Kwame Nkrumah, who already had a wide reputation as an experienced political organizer with a gift for leadership. Together with George Padmore and others he had organised in 1945 the Fifth Pan-African Congress in Manchester, England. Nkrumah personally drew up the dynamic Declaration to the Colonial Peoples of the World, approved and adopted by the Congress. He was an eminently suitable person to galvanize the mass of the Gold Coast people and the youth to play an active part in the national liberation movement.

Initially, Nkrumah was hesitant about accepting the position, being aware that both the composition and objectives of the UGCC fell far short of the radical, political program he envisaged for the Gold Coast and for Africa. But after discussion with his colleagues he decided to accept, knowing that it might not be long before he would find it impossible to continue working within the UGCC. On 14 November 1947, Kwame Nkrumah set sail from Liverpool aboard the SS Accra, accompanied by Kojo Botsio, another friend from London who was also member of WASU and with that, the beginning of a new chapter in the modern political history of Ghana begun.

Kwame Nkrumah was officially introduced to the UGCC's Working Committee as their Secretary on 28 December 1947 and soon got to work seeking to expand the support base of the UGCC by mobilizing the youth through local youth societies in the Colony (e.g., Apowa Literary and Social Club) and the Ashanti Confederacy (e.g., Asante Youth Association- AYA), whose members were farmers, petty-traders, drivers, artisans, school, teachers, clerks and letter-writers, many of whom were the growing number of elementary-school-leavers. In the beginning, the UGCC had only a handful of branches in the larger coastal towns and Kibi. It had no official presence in Ashanti and there had been no attempt to enlist support for the organization in the Northern territories. Nkrumah setting about to change this, travelled extensively and organized mass meetings and within six months hundreds of branches of the UGCC had been established throughout the Gold Coast.

=== The 1948 riots ===
At the time of Nkrumah's arrival in the Gold Coast in late 1947, there was growing discontent among ordinary people with the economy due to shortages of consumer goods and rising prices. Farmers were dissatisfied with the policy of cutting-out cocoa trees ravaged by the swollen-shoot disease with no compensation. Ex-servicemen who had fought in World War II "for King and country" had only been awarded a meagre gratuity and were experiencing the same hardships as the general populace.

Neither the chiefs nor the political class championed the growing disaffection in the country and it fell to Nii Kwabena Bonne II, Osu Alata Mantse, to lead the agitation against the growing economic hardship and especially the rising prices of consumer goods. Just over a month after Nkrumah's arrival in the Gold Coast, the growing discontent found expression in a boycott of mostly foreign-owned trading firms organized by Nii Kwabena Bonne on 26 January 1948.

The boycott continued for a month, while its leaders negotiated price reductions with the government and the trading firms in the Association of West African Merchants (AWAM). There was unrest also among the ex-servicemen and both Kwame Nkrumah and Dr Joseph Boakye Danquah addressed them at a rally in Accra on 20 February 1948. A petition expressing their grievances was drawn up to be presented to the Governor.

Nii Bonne's boycott agreed new reduced prices that were to come into effect on 28 February 1948 and the boycott of the foreign trading firms was called off. As fate would have it, however, on that same day, 28 February, the ex-servicemen set off to march to Christiansborg Castle to present their petition. Their way was blocked by armed police commanded by a British officer, Superintendent Colin Imray. When the marchers refused to halt, Imray gave the order to open fire. Three ex-servicemen – Sergeant Adjetey, Private Odartey Lamptey and Corporal Attipoe – were killed and many others were injured. News of the shooting sparked off days of rioting in Accra by already angry crowds incensed at the high price of food, which they blamed on the greed of foreign merchants. Shops and offices owned by foreigners were attacked and looted. Violence spread to other towns.

Faced with widespread disorder, the Governor, Sir Gerald Creasy, declared a state of emergency. Troops were called out, while police arrested so-called trouble makers. The executive committee of the UGCC sent telegrams to Arthur Creech Jones, the then British Secretary of State for the Colonies, asking for a Special Commissioner to be sent to the Gold Coast with power to call a Constituent Assembly.

Leaders of the UGCC — J. B. Danquah, Ofori Atta, Akufo Addo, Ako Adjei, Obetsebi Lamptey and Kwame Nkrumah, subsequently known as The Big Six – were arrested and flown to the Northern Territories, where they were detained for six weeks before being taken to Accra to appear at a Commission of Enquiry set up by the Governor under the chairmanship of Aiken Watson Q.C.

After interrogating the accused, the Watson commissioners concluded that Nkrumah was mainly to blame for the disorders. In their words: "The U.G.C.C. did not really get down to business until the arrival of Mr. Nkrumah on December 16, 1947." They correctly detected that Nkrumah's political objectives were far more progressive than those of his colleagues. They recommended the drafting of a new constitution to replace the outdated Burns constitution. As a result, in December 1948, a constitutional committee was appointed by the Governor under the chairmanship of Mr. Justice Coussey.

The leadership of the UGCC blamed Nkrumah for the riots and some, including Obestebi-Lamptey and William Ofori-Atta, ransacked his house looking for evidence that he was a communist. It was becoming clear that differences between Nkrumah and other leaders of the UGCC would soon make it impossible for them to continue to work together.

Although the detentions increased the popularity of the UGCC leaders, it also led to infighting and finger-pointing among the UGCC leadership and created a split between the conservative intelligentsia of the UGCC who favoured a gradualist approach to independence on one hand, and the radical "Verandah Boys", on the other, who listened willingly to Nkrumah and were opposed to the convention.

The appointment and acceptance of some UGCC members including J. B. Danquah as members of the Justice Coussey's "Committee on Constitutional Reform" enabled Nkrumah to organize the local youth societies on which the UGCC was based while lawyers of the UGCC, then on good terms with the Colonial administration were absorbed in the Coussey committee meetings.

In August 1948, the "Committee on Youth Organizations" was formed with K. A. Gbedemah as chair and Kojo Botsio as Secretary. J.B. Danquah and his colleagues had become alarmed at the rapidly growing support of their members for Nkrumah and his dynamic leadership. They disapproved of his founding of the Committee on Youth Organisation (CYO), regarding it as a pressure group advancing Nkrumah's determination to speed up the campaign for self-government. The CYO adopted the slogan "Self-Government Now", in contrast to the UGCC slogan "Self-Government in the shortest possible time". They feared Nkrumah's policy might lead to further disorder and further arrests.

Nkrumah was called before the UGCC Working Committee and suspended from his post as general secretary following questioning about his persistent use of the word "Comrade" as a term of address and his continued connections with the West African National Secretariat in London.

The UGCC leadership was determined to remove Nkrumah as general secretary. After the publication of the first issue of the Accra Evening News, founded and managed by Nkrumah and edited by K. A. Gbedemah in September 1948, UGCC's main financier affectionately known as Paa Grant demanded Nkrumah's removal from office. At a meeting of the UGCC executive in Saltpond, matters came to a head, with Nkrumah's private secretary being dismissed and Nkrumah himself demoted to the position of treasurer, which he at first refused but later accepted in November 1948.

Nkrumah and his supporters became increasingly exasperated at what they saw as the timidity of the UGCC by mid-1949; with the mass of the people and the youth behind him, Nkrumah and his colleagues were in a strong position to split with the UGCC to form a new party.

=== Birth of the CPP ===
After a three-day meeting of the CYO in early June 1949, in Tarkwa, one faction led by K. A. Gbedemah and Kojo Botsio advocated for a clean break with the UGCC while another, led by Kofi Baako's faction demanded Nkrumah's reinstatement as general secretary of the UGCC to enable them to capture the convention from within. The compromise reached was that a new party be formed but should retain the name "Convention".

On 11 June 1949, the Working Committee of the UGCC issued two resolutions declaring that membership of the CYO and the UGCC were incompatible and gave notice that Nkrumah was to be "served with charges" for disregarding "the obligations of collective responsibility and party discipline" and by publishing in The Accra Evening News, views, opinions, and criticisms, "assailing the decisions and questioning the integrity of the Working Committee", he had undermined the convention, abused its leaders and stolen its ideas.

A day later, on 12 June 1949, before a crowd of some 60,000 people which had gathered on the Old Polo Ground, the CPP was born and Kwame Nkrumah resigned as general secretary of the UGCC. He declared that the CYO had decided to break away from the UGCC to become an entirely separate political party, the Convention People's Party (CPP).

Kojo Botsio sent a telegram to the UGCC Working Committee informing them about the formation of the CPP under the chairmanship of Nkrumah with the aim of "Self-Government Now for Chiefs and People of the Gold Coast, a democratic government and a higher living standard for the people". The UGCC Working Committee responded with a statement on 15 June 1949 warning members that the convention had nothing to do with the newly formed CPP, and that Paa Grant expects loyalty from all UGCC members and considers "formation [of a] new political party inimical to interests of [the] country".

Wiser heads in UGCC understood danger ahead and appealed for a resolution of the conflict. On 26 June 1949, arbitrators were appointed to examine the dispute between Nkrumah and the UGCC Working Committee and an emergency conference of the UGCC, youth groups and the CPP met in Saltpond. But it was too late: the CPP made a clean break with the UGCC at the conference when there was no agreement on the condition that a new Working Committee be elected following Nkrumah's acceptance to disband the CPP and resume general secretaryship of the UGCC.

The foundation of the CPP marked a decisive turning point in the history of Ghana, for it led directly to the achievement of Ghana's independence on 6 March 1957.

=== 1951 elections ===
The imprisonment of the CPP leadership created a political vacuum which the then Governor said he was "anxious to fill without delay" by rallying "moderate opinion in support of the plan for the constitutional advance set out in the Coussey report and His Majesty's Government statement, with a view to encouraging the emergence of a strong moderate party sufficiently cohesive and vocal to deal with such dissident elements as retain any substantial popular following" (emphasis added).

In the meantime, K.A Gbedemah who had been released from an earlier arrest in October 1949, kept the central organization of the party running and was in constant touch with Nkrumah who was held in James Fort prison from where messages were smuggled out on toilet paper to party headquarters. Nkrumah was helped by a friendly warder who managed to smuggle messages to party headquarters, where the work of the CPP was continuing. A concise CPP election manifesto, written on sheets of toilet paper, was delivered to CPP/HQ in this way. CPP manifestos were always short, simple and direct leaving the electorate in no doubt about what a CPP victory would mean. They expressed just what the majority of the people wanted. As 1951 election result showed, the CPP correctly gauged the pulse of the nation.

In the 1950 municipal elections held in the major cities – Accra (April), Cape Coast (June) and Kumasi (November), – the CPP swept the board with stunning, if unexpected victories. In the Kumasi municipal election, the CPP won ALL contested seats and opposition attempts to attribute this stunning victory to CPP intimidation was swiftly discredited by two European journalists who observed and reported on the elections. In a dispatch by the Governor to the Colonial Office on 2 November he wrote:

"I am informed that the reason for the sweeping success of CPP in obtaining all contested seats was due to real organizing capacity and that the debacle of the opposition was due to apathy and not to intimidation"

The colonial government began to revise its view of the CPP describing it as "clearly more politically skillful than any mere hooligan element could have been".

As plans for the elections to the legislative assembly gathered pace, the CPP took what Governor Arden Clarke was later to describe as a "decisive stroke" to put up Kwame Nkrumah, who was still serving his term of imprisonment in James Fort, as the candidate for Accra Central –now part of today's Odododiodoo constituency. Once again the CPP achieved a stunning victory in the February 1951 Gold Coast legislative election. In 1951 the manifesto could be summed up in three words: Self-Government NOW.

The party won the directly elected urban seats with ten times as many votes as those of the combined opposition with Nkrumah polling a massive 22,780 out of the available 23,122 votes in his Accra Central constituency. In the thirty-three rural seats elected indirectly through electoral colleges, the CPP secured a stunning 29 seats to UGCC's three. In the two-member constituency of the Akim Abuakwa Dr. J. B. Danquah and William Ofori Atta got through by the barest of squeaks – with majorities of 10 and 4 electoral college votes respectively – in their ancestral homeland. Dr K. A. Busia on the other hand, lost his seat and owed his seat in the Legislative Assembly as representative for the Ashanti Confederacy Council.

Soon after the elections, the CPP wrote to the Governor seeking a deputation to discuss the immediate release of Kwame Nkrumah from prison. So that he did not appear to have been forced, the Governor delayed the decision until after the Territorial Council elections that weekend and then made arrangements for Nkrumah's release for 1 p.m. on the following Monday claiming it was "an act of grace".

=== 1954 elections ===
In June 1952, the new Secretary of State for the Colonies Oliver Lyttleton visited the Gold Coast and agreed to a process of consultation with chiefs and the people to proposal for constitutional changes. On the basis of proposals received from chiefs and a broad spectrum of groups and numerous consultations with the territorial council, the trade union congress and opposition parties, the government published a white paper on constitutional change on 19 June 1953 which were accepted as the basis for the transition to independence in December 1956.

On the basis of these proposals, the CPP government introduced a bill in the Legislative Assembly on 10 July 1953, famously dubbed by The Evening News as the "Motion of Destiny". This called upon Britain to make arrangement for independence. It required all members of the Assembly to be elected directly by secret ballot, and Cabinet members of the Assembly and directly responsible to it. Britain was asked for a clear commitment to independence by naming a date. Britain conceded the demand for independence but insisted on another election first.

The first directly held elections in the country's history took place on 19 June 1954 and the CPP won 72 out of 104 seats, the GCP (the last rump of the UGCC) were routed winning only 1 seat and so it was left to the Northern People's Party (NPP) with 12 seats to form the official opposition. Dr J. B. Danquah, and Mr. William Ofori-Atta both lost their seats and Dr K. A. Busia, won his seat by a mere 11 votes. However, the euphoria surrounding this massive victory was soon to turn sour with a sudden turn in events that ushered the country through a period of instability and violence, the like of which had never been seen before or since.

=== 1956 elections ===
The stage was set for settlement, once and for all, the opposing views of how an independent Ghana would be governed. Once again, Mr K. A. Gbedemah led the CPP campaign and challenged the NLM's call for a federal constitution and revealed their true intentions by declaring:, "[w]hat they [NLM] want and have never been able to say openly is that THEY should be in office and not the C.P.P.".

Despite the NLM's argument that federalism was a natural way of organizing Ghana's regional and tribal groupings, when it had the opportunity to draft a new constitution for Ghana in 1969 it proposed a unitary form of government and conveniently side-stepped all of its previous arguments in favor of federation; regional assemblies were not established in the second republic neither were the fixed farm gate prices for cocoa reversed. Much of the basis of the NLM's violent campaign does not appear to have been based on any principles but rooted, as Gbedemah had argued, in a deep-seated dislike for the CPP and Nkrumah.

In the course of the 1956 campaign, Gbedemah declared that if the CPP were defeated in the 1956 elections it would happily be a loyal opposition to an NLM government and he challenged that leader of the NLM, Dr Busia to give a similar undertaking. In a portent of how the opposition would behave post-independence, Dr. Busia openly declared instead that the NLM would "take steps IN and OUT of the Legislative Assembly" against the CPP, which he described as "evil".

The CPP election machine sprang into action, confident of a decisive result but taking no chances. As on previous occasions, the party manifesto was brief, summed up in just seventeen words: Do I want Independence in my life-time? Or do I want to revert to feudalism and imperialism?’ The impractical, divisive option of federalism in a country the size of Ghana was not allowed to cloud the issue.

In June 1956, the CPP recorded another impressive victory winning 71 seats including all 44 seats in the Colony and 8 out of the 21 in Ashanti. The NLM failed to win a single seat outside Ashanti. However, for all their appeal to Ashanti nationalism, the CPP won 43 percent of the votes cast in Ashanti, proving once again that although the NLM was predominantly an Ashanti party, not all Ashantis were NLM supporters.

Once again Dr J. B. Danquah failed to win his seat but that was not the only familiar outcome: again the NLM refused to accept the results of democratic elections and proceeded to derail the transitional plans toward independence. With twisted logic argued that the distribution of the votes in the 1956 election vindicated their position for a federal constitution because the CPP did not win a majority in Ashanti or the Northern Territories.

=== Independence ===
At midnight on 5/6 March 1957, on the Polo Ground in Accra, Nkrumah proclaimed the Independence of Ghana. Cries of "FREEDOM! FREEDOM! FREEDOM!" were heard from the crowd as the British flag was lowered and the red, green, and gold flag of Ghana was raised in its place. It was the climax of the CPP's campaign to bring colonial rule to an end.

The party's first objective, the battle for political freedom had been won, without resort to arms. In the words of Nkrumah on that historic night: "At long last the battle has ended. And thus Ghana, your beloved country is free for ever." But there would be further battles in the years ahead to build a new Ghana and to achieve Pan- African objectives. The struggle for economic independence and social justice was only just beginning.

==== 24 February 1966 ====
While on his way as leader of the British Commonwealth mission to seek a resolution to the Vietnam crisis, the CPP government was overthrown by a military junta and members of the Ghana Police who had since 1964 at least, been working with the Central Intelligence Agency (CIA) of the United States to bring about a change in government.

For some hours, the presidential Guard Regiment of Flagstaff House resisted fiercely, but was eventually forced to surrender. There was no popular participation in the coup. The ordinary people were initially stunned.

The military/police junta co-opted key members of the opposition such as Dr. K. A. Busia, who was on the junta's political committee, and Mr. Victor Owusu, who became the military junta's attorney general. The Preventive Detention Act was repealed and replaced by the Preventive Custody Degree with two modifications: (1) detainees could make no appeal and (2) there was no requirement to inform them as to why they were being arrested.

Troops and police rounded up key CPP personnel and flung them into prison. Practically the entire Party leadership throughout the country was arrested. Included were all cabinet ministers, members of Parliament, officials of CPP and all its subsidiary, associate organisations including trade union leaders.

With Nkrumah out of the country en route to Vietnam with peace proposals, with all the key points in Accra seized, and with the CPP leadership arrested, immediate effective resistance was out of the question. The military / police junta installed itself in power, declaring the CPP government abolished and the Party banned. Members of the CPP were banned from participating in party political activity for the next thirteen years until 1979.

=== 1979–1981: Back in Government ===
Although the ban on party politics was lifted by the military regime of General Akuffo in the late 1970s, the CPP remained banned and the party name and symbol could not be used. The CPP regrouped in the People's National Party (PNP) under the leadership of Alhaji Imoru Egala, who had become the father of the party. He, however, remained ineligible to contest in the 1979 election as result of the party political decrees of the National Liberation Council that overthrew the CPP in 1966.

In his place, Dr. Hilla Limann was elected the party's presidential candidate while Egala tried to clear his name. The PNP won the 1979 elections and Dr. Hilla Limann became president of Ghana. Unfortunately however, on 31 December 1981, his government was overthrown by Flight Lieutenant Jerry John Rawlings, who went to govern the country first as military dictator in the Provisional National Defence Council (PNDC) and as first president of the fourth republic leading the National Democratic Party (NDC) he founded while in office.

=== The Fourth Republic ===
When the ban on party politics was lifted again in 1992, the CPP was unable to organise and rally around any leader. Imoru Egala had died, and, although Hilla Limann was still alive, he was not accorded the recognition as leader of the party.

A number of splinter groups emerged, including the People's National Convention (PNC) led by Hilla Limann, the National Convention Party (NCP) led by Kow Nkensen Arkaah, who later became vice president to Rawlings, the People's Heritage Party and many others led by previous party stalwarts such as the former Minister for Education Kwaku Boateng. All the splinter parties contested the 1992 elections and lost massively.

There were realignments before the 1996 election, but with the exception of the PNC, now led by Edward Mahama, most of the other Nkrumaist parties had entered a 'Grand Alliance' and supported the presidential ambitions of the leader of the New Patriotic Party, John Agyekum Kufour.

On 22 August 2020, Ivor Greenstreet was elected as the flag bearer for the 2020 elections. He garnered 213 votes and his competitors split the votes as Bright Akwetey gathered 27 and Divine Ayivor had 14 votes. Ivor Kobina Greenstreet represented the party in the 2016 elections hence this forms the second time he represents the party at the national level.

At the elections on 7 December 2004, the party won three out of 230 seats. Its candidate in the presidential elections, George Aggudey, won only 1.0% of the vote.

In the 2008 presidential and parliamentary elections, the party won one parliamentary seat for Kwame Nkrumah's daughter, Samia Nkrumah, in the Jomoro constituency. The presidential candidate, Paa Kwesi Nduom, performed below expectation, receiving 1.4% of total valid votes.

In June 2018, the party was admitted in the Socialist International as consultative member.

In December 2023, the National Executive Committee, a meeting of representatives from different regional committees and organs of the party, passed a resolution attempting to dissolve the national leadership after accusing them of financial malpractice, administrative incompetence, and the sale of party data to Alan John Kyerematen's Movement for Change prior to the 2024 election. The NEC formed a 13-member interim body to manage affairs for the foreseeable future until a new leadership is elected. Subsequently, the General Secretary, National Treasurer, National Organizer, National Organizer for Women, and National Organizer for youth all resigned, while the Party Chair Nana Akosua Frimpomaa Sarpong-Kumankumah disputed the allegations and refused to resign. Reactions within the party were split, with some in the Elder Council and National Executive Committee maintaining support for Chair Nana Frimpomaa on the grounds that her removal was conducted improperly and went against the party's constitution, while regional chapters from Ashanti and the Northern Region sided with the NEC interim leadership and announced that they would discipline any party members in their region that interact with the old leadership. Despite the leadership crisis, the party affirmed that these developments would not affect their preparations for the general election that will be held later this year.

== National Executives ==
The Convention People's Party holds its national delegates convention every fours to elect a new set of executives to lead.

It held its most recent election at the Eastern region on 22 August 2020 to elect a flagbearer and set of executives to lead the party.

Below were the current national executives elected:

National Position	Officer/s
Chair	Nana Akosua Frimpomaa Sarpong–Kumankumah (Disputed)
Vice Chair	Onsy Kwame Nkrumah (First)
Vice Chair	Emmanuel Ogborjor (Second)
Vice Chair	J. B. Daniels (Third)
General Secretary	Nana Yaa Akyimpim Jantuah (Resigned 2023)
Treasurer	Emmanuel Opare Oduro (Resigned 2023)
National Organizer	Moses Ambing Yirimbo (Resigned 2023)
National Organizer for Women	Hajia Aisha Sulley (Resigned 2023)
National Organizer for Youth	Osei Kofi Aquah (Resigned 2023)

== Election results ==
=== Presidential elections ===
Election	Candidate	Running mate	First round		Second round		Result
Election	Candidate	Running mate	Votes	%	Votes	%	Result
1960	Kwame Nkrumah		1,016,076	89.07%	—		Elected ✓
1964 (referendum)	Kwame Nkrumah		2,773,920	99.91%	—		Elected ✓
2000	George Hagan	Alhaji Ibrahim Mahama	115,641	1.78%	—		Lost ✗
2004	George Aggudey	Bright Kwame Ameyaw	85,968	1.00%	—		Lost ✗
2008	Paa Kwesi Nduom		113,494	1.34%	—		Lost ✗
2012	Michael Abu Sakara Foster	Nana Akosua Frimpomaa	20,323	0.18%	—		Lost ✗
2016	Ivor Greenstreet	Gabby Nsiah Nketiah	25,552	0.24%	—		Lost ✗
2020	Ivor Greenstreet	Emmanuel Bobobe	12,200	0.09%	—		Lost ✗
2024	Nana Akosua Frimpomaa	Wayoe Ghanamanti	23,991	0.21%	—		Lost ✗

=== Parliamentary elections ===
Election	Votes		%	Seats	+/–	Position	Result
1951	Urban areas	58,585	91.31%	34 / 38	▲34	▲1st	Supermajority government
1951	Rural areas	1,950	71.88%	34 / 38	▲34	▲1st	Supermajority government
1954	391,817		55.44%	72 / 104	▲38	1st	Supermajority government
1956	398,141		57.10%	71 / 104	▼1	1st	Supermajority government
1965				198 / 198	▲121	1st	Sole legal party
Banned in 1966 refounded in 1996
2000	285,643		4.37%	1 / 200	▼5	3rd	Opposition
2004	247,753		2.88%	3 / 200	▲2	3rd	Opposition
2008	252,266		2.95%	1 / 200	▼2	3rd	Opposition
2012	81,009		0.73%	1 / 200	Steady	3rd	Opposition
2016	69,346		0.64%	0 / 200	▼1	▼4th	Extra-parliamentary
2020	11,105		0.08%	0 / 200	0	▼6th	Extra-parliamentary
2024	4,375		0.04%	0 / 200	0	0	Extra-parliamentary

== See also ==
- Nkrumah government

New title	Governments of Ghana; Parliamentary democracy Queen Elizabeth II ceremonial Head of state 1957 – 1960	First Republic established
New title	Governments of Ghana; First Republic; 1960 – 1966	Succeeded by National Liberation Council; Military regime
