= Association of West African Merchants =

Trade association

The Association of West African Merchants (AWAM) was a trade association that sold European goods in the Gold Coast. It was originally formed in 1916 for European merchants to discuss problems relating to West African trade. The Gold Coast branch was formed during the late Second World War as suggested by the government to assist in the administration of the war-time economic controls. The acronym AWAM over the years became used to mean the manipulation of terms of trade to disadvantage customers in favour of traders. In the local parlance, it was synonymous with "Kuluulu".

== History ==
Membership of the Association of West African Merchants was made up of the United Africa Company, Union Trading Company), and "Oliphant" (G. B. Olivant). The firms participated in merchandise agreements in Gold Coast. Their participation led to limited competition in the retail sector by determining the minimum prices and commissions.

There was agitation from the indigenes against foreign imports. The Association of West African Merchants was accused of conspiring with the colonial government to cut Africans out of wholesaling and retailing, of trade monopoly, and cheating customers. They were also involved in price-fixing and market-sharing agreements to restrict import-export trade in Gold Coast.

The operationalization of the Association of West African Merchants led to the boycott of European imports by Theodore Taylor, also known as Nii Kwabena Bonney III, an Accra businessman and chief and Osu Alata Mantse, with the slogan: "We cannot buy; Your prices are too high. If you don't cut down your prices then close down your stores; And take away your goods to your own country." The boycott coincided with the peaceful march to Osu Castle by war veterans demanding pension pay equal to that of their British counterparts.

This event led to the Riots of 1948 after three of the protesters, namely Sergeant Adjetey, Lance Corporal Attipoe and Private Odartey-Lamptey, were shot dead on 28 February 1948. In all, 29 people were shot dead and 237 were injured, leading to the looting of Association of West African Merchants shops.

This event led to the declaration of martial law and to the arrest of the "Big Six" – the leaders of the United Gold Coast Convention (UGCC). The Watson Commission that followed led to the delivery of constitution for independence. The Watson Commission recommended an extensive Legislative Assembly with more Ghanaian inclusive.

== Significance and aftermath ==
- From these events emerged the Henley Coussey commission that was led by an African lawyer, James Henley Coussey. The commission's recommendations included a new constitution with democratic procedures and a greater representation of Africans as the basis of future colonial approach.
- In 1949, Sir Charles Arden-Clarke was appointed governor of the territory.
- The dismissing of Coussey's reforms as "bogus and fraudulent" by Dr. Kwame Nkrumah led to the split of the UGCC to form CPP.
- The road to the seat of Government was renamed 28 February Road, which is now called the Prof.John Fiifi Atta Mills High Street.
- The Gold Coast Industrial Development Corporation (GCIDC) was established by the colonial administration in 1952 to provide support to indigenes; to establish an entity that would facilitate participation of private indigenous persons in business.
- There were social, cultural, and political implications of consumerism that led up to and directly after Gold Coast independence in 1957.
