= Coussey Committee =

1949 political group in the Gold Coast

The Coussey Committee was established on 14 March 1949, after the 1948 Accra riots, to draft a constitution towards self-rule for the country Gold Coast. The committee was chaired by Sir Henley Coussey. The committee's report was presented to the governor of the Gold Coast Sir Charles Noble Arden-Clarke on 17 August 1949. It was published by H.M.S.O. on 7 November 1949.

== History ==
The committee made provision for greater African representation in Government as there were increasing demands for a representative government by Gold Coasters. The Watson Commission had earlier recommended an extensive Legislative Assembly with more Ghanaians included on 26 April 1948.

All the leaders of the UGCC were members of the committee except Kwame Nkrumah. He was considered an opponent of the British position of a gradual move towards self-government. His views of "independence now" were at variance with the United Gold Coast Convention (UGCC). His radical views led to his demotion to a treasurer in August 1948.

William Ofori Atta headed a committee convened at Saltpond, later in June 1949, to settle the differences between Kwame Nkrumah and other UGCC members. The Committee on Youth Organization (CYO), the youth wing, insisted Nkrumah not be reconciled with the intelligentsia. At the West Africa arena, he officially rejected the recommendations on 20 November 1949. Nkrumah declared the Coussey constitution as "bogus and fraudulent". A principal body, the Ghana Representative Council (ARC), was formed to initiate an appeal against the report.

This event led to Nkrumah breaking away from the UGCC. He later announced the formation of the Convention People's Party (CPP) on 12 January 1949 to attain his ideals of "self-government, now, now, now", which became their slogan. The CPP attacked both the colonial government and the UGCC.

== Members ==
In addition to the chairman of the committee, Coussey, there were 38 other members:

1. Rev. G. R. Acquaah
2. Hon. B. D. Addai
3. Mr. Asari Adjabeng
4. Nana Adjaye Bonsra
5. Mr. E. Akufo Addo
6. Mr. J. P. Allotey Hammond
7. Hon. Nana Amanfi III, C.B.E.
8. Hon. E. O. Asafu-Adjaye
9. Hon. Rev. C. G. Baeta
10. Mr. K. A. Bossman
11. J. A. Braimah (Kabachewura)
12. Hon. Dr. J. B. Danquah
13. Mr. M. Dowuona
14. Cannon C. H. Elliot
15. Mr. W. G. Essien
16. Mr. J. H. Gambrah
17. Hon. Nana Kwame Gyebi Ababio
18. Mr. George A. Grant
19. J. A. Karbo (Lawra Na)
20. Mr. Cobina Kessie
21. Hon. Nene Azu Mate Kole
22. Mr. A. L. K. Menka
23. Hon. G. E. Moore
24. Hon. Dr. F. V. Nanka-Bruce, O.B.E.
25. Hon E. O. Obetsebi Lamptey
26. Nana Ofori Atta II
27. Hon. N. A. Ollennu
28. Hon. E. C. Quist, O.B.E.
29. Mr. J. A. A. Salaam
30. Mr. Magnus Sampson
31. Mr. W. E. G. Sekyi
32. Hon. C. W. Tachie-Menson, O.B.E.
33. Yakubu Tali (Tali Na)
34. Mr. W. W. Taylor
35. Hon. Nana Sir Tsibu Darku IX Kt., O.B.E.
36. Mr. S. Wood
37. Mr. J. T. N. Yankah, M.B.E.
38. Mr. N. Yenli

== Significance ==
- The committee gave birth to the 1951 constitution.
- First all-African government
