= February 28 =

February 28 this year in various calendars
- Saturday, 28 February 2026
Akan	Fomemene
Armenian	13 Areg 1475
Aztec	Tecuilhuitontli 9, 11 Ōlīn
Babylonian	10 Shabatu, 2336 SE
Balinese pawukon	Menga, Pasah, Sri, Umanis, Tungleh, Saniscara of Bala, Ludra, Dangu, Sri
Bengali	15 Falgun, BS 1432
Chinese	Yin Water Rooster・Willow Mansion; Fire Horse Year, Month 1, Day 12 (Yushui, 5 days until Jingzhe)
Common Era	28 February 2026 CE
Coptic	21 Meshir, AM 1742
Egyptian	18 Epiphi, 2774 NE
Ethiopian	21 Yakātit, 2018 Amätä Məhrät
French Republican	Décade I, Décadi de Ventôse de l'Année 234 de la République
Gregorian	28 February, AD 2026
Hebrew	11 Adar, AM 5786
Hindu	Punarvasu・Saubhāgya; Solar: 16 Phālguna, 1947 SE; Lunisolar: Dvādaśī, Śukla pakṣa of Phālguna, 2082 VE; Rāudra・5126 KY・1,872,634
Icelandic	Laugardagur, 7 Góa 2025
Islamic	11 Ramadan, AH 1447 (using tabular method)
ISO week date	2026-W09-6
Japanese	12 Mutsuki, Reiwa 8 (Usui, 5 days until Keichitsu)
Julian	15 February, AD 2026 (AM 7534)
Julian day	2461100
Korean	12 Horangidal, 4359 DE
Maya	13.0.13.6.17; 15 Kayab, 11 Caban
Roman	ante diem XV Kalendas Martias, MMDCCLXXIX AUC
Solar Hijri	9 Esfand, SH 1404
Tibetan	12 mchu, me pho rta 2153 or 1772 or 1000

<<	February					>>
Su	Mo	Tu	We	Th	Fr	Sa
1	2	3	4	5	6	7
8	9	10	11	12	13	14
15	16	17	18	19	20	21
22	23	24	25	26	27	28
2026

February 28 in recent years
2026 (Saturday)
2025 (Friday)
2024 (Wednesday)
2023 (Tuesday)
2022 (Monday)
2021 (Sunday)
2020 (Friday)
2019 (Thursday)
2018 (Wednesday)
2017 (Tuesday)

February 28 is the 59th day of the year in the Gregorian calendar; 306 days remain until the end of the year (307 in leap years).

== Events ==
=== Pre-1600 ===
- 202 BC – Liu Bang is enthroned as the Emperor of China, beginning four centuries of rule by the Han dynasty.
- 870 – The Fourth Council of Constantinople closes.
- 1525 – Aztec king Cuauhtémoc is executed on the order of conquistador Hernán Cortés.

=== 1601–1900 ===
- 1638 – The Scottish National Covenant is signed in Edinburgh.
- 1835 – Elias Lönnrot signs and dates the foreword to the first version of the Kalevala, the so-called Old Kalevala.
- 1844 – A gun explodes on board the steam warship USS Princeton during a pleasure cruise down the Potomac River, killing six, including Secretary of State Abel Upshur. President John Tyler, who is also on board, is not injured from the blast.

=== 1901–present ===
- 1922 – The United Kingdom ends its protectorate over Egypt through a Unilateral Declaration of Independence.
- 1925 – The Charlevoix-Kamouraska earthquake strikes northeastern North America.
- 1947 – February 28 incident: In Taiwan, civil disorder is put down with the death of an estimated 18,000 - 28,000 civilians.
- 1948 – The 1948 Accra riots erupt following a march by ex-servicemen of the Gold Coast Regiment towards the seat of the colonial government at Christiansborg Castle, where they were fired upon by Superintendent Colin Imray, leading to the killing of Sergeant Adjetey, Corporal Attipoe and Private Odartey Lamptey and the arrest of the Big Six in the Gold Coast.
- 1958 – A school bus in Floyd County, Kentucky hits a wrecker truck and plunges down an embankment into the rain-swollen Levisa Fork river. The driver and 26 children die in one of the worst school bus accidents in U.S. history.
- 1959 – Discoverer 1, an American spy satellite that is the first object intended to achieve a polar orbit, is launched but fails to achieve orbit.
- 1966 – A NASA T-38 Talon crashes into the McDonnell Aircraft factory while attempting a poor-visibility landing at Lambert Field, St. Louis, killing astronauts Elliot See and Charles Bassett.
- 1969 – The 1969 Portugal earthquake hits Portugal, Spain and Morocco.
- 1973 – Aeroflot Flight X-167 crashes during takeoff from Semey Airport, killing 32 people.
- 1974 – The British election ends in a hung parliament after the Jeremy Thorpe-led Liberal Party achieved their biggest vote share since 1929.
- 1975 – In London, an underground train fails to stop at Moorgate terminus station and crashes into the end of the tunnel, killing 43 people.
- 1983 – The final episode of M*A*S*H airs, with almost 110 million viewers.
- 1985 – The Provisional Irish Republican Army carries out a mortar attack on the Royal Ulster Constabulary police station at Newry, killing nine officers.
- 1986 – Olof Palme, 26th Prime Minister of Sweden, is assassinated in Stockholm.
- 1990 – Space Shuttle Atlantis is launched on STS-36.
- 1993 – Bureau of Alcohol, Tobacco and Firearms (ATF) agents raid the Branch Davidian church in Waco, Texas with a warrant to arrest the group's leader David Koresh, starting a 51-day standoff.
- 1997 – An earthquake in northern Iran is responsible for about 1,100 deaths.
- 1997 – A Turkish military memorandum results in the collapse of the coalition government in Turkey.
- 2001 – The 2001 Nisqually earthquake, having a moment magnitude of 6.8, with epicenter in southern Puget Sound, damages the Seattle metropolitan area.
- 2002 – During the religious violence in Gujarat, 97 people are killed in the Naroda Patiya massacre and 69 in the Gulbarg Society massacre.
- 2013 – Pope Benedict XVI resigns as the pope of the Catholic Church, becoming the first pope to do so voluntarily since Pope Gregory XII in 1415.
- 2023 – Two trains collide south of the Vale of Tempe in Greece, leading to the deaths of at least 57 people and leaving 58 missing and 85 injured.
- 2024 – Prime Minister Modi of India inaugurates the 2nd Space Port of India - Kulasekarapattinam Spaceport.
- 2026 – The United States and Israel launch attacks across Iran, assassinating Supreme Leader Ali Khamenei. Retaliatory strikes are launched by Iran against US military bases in the Gulf, with explosions reported in Bahrain, Kuwait, Qatar and the UAE.

== Births ==
=== Pre-1600 ===
- 1261 – Margaret of Scotland, Queen of Norway (died 1283)
- 1518 – Francis III, Duke of Brittany, Duke of Brittany (died 1536)
- 1533 – Michel de Montaigne, French philosopher and author (died 1592)
- 1535 – Cornelius Gemma, Dutch astronomer and astrologer (died 1578)
- 1552 – Jost Bürgi, Swiss mathematician and clockmaker (died 1632)

=== 1601–1900 ===
- 1675 – Guillaume Delisle, French cartographer (died 1726)
- 1683 – René Antoine Ferchault de Réaumur, French entomologist and academic (died 1757)
- 1690 – Alexei Petrovich, Tsarevich of Russia, eldest son of Peter the Great (died 1718)
- 1704 – Louis Godin, French astronomer and academic (died 1760)
- 1833 – Alfred von Schlieffen, German military strategist (died 1913)
- 1848 – Arthur Giry, French historian and academic (died 1899)
- 1858 – Tore Svennberg, Swedish actor and director (died 1941)
- 1866 – Vyacheslav Ivanov, Russian poet and playwright (died 1949)
- 1878 – Pierre Fatou, French mathematician and astronomer (died 1929)
- 1884 – Ants Piip, Estonian lawyer and politician, 7th Prime Minister of Estonia (died 1942)
- 1887 – William Zorach, Lithuanian-American sculptor and painter (died 1966)
- 1894 – Ben Hecht, American director, producer, and screenwriter (died 1964)
- 1896 – Philip Showalter Hench, American physician and endocrinologist, Nobel Prize laureate (died 1965)
- 1898 – Zeki Rıza Sporel, Turkish footballer (died 1969)

=== 1901–present ===
- 1901 – Linus Pauling, American chemist and activist, Nobel Prize laureate (died 1994)
- 1906 – Bugsy Siegel, American gangster (died 1947)
- 1907 – Milton Caniff, American cartoonist (died 1988)
- 1908 – Billie Bird, American actress (died 2002)
- 1909 – Stephen Spender, English author and poet (died 1995)
- 1915 – Ketti Frings, American author, playwright, and screenwriter (died 1981)
- 1915 – Peter Medawar, Brazilian-English biologist and immunologist, Nobel Prize laureate (died 1987)
- 1919 – Alfred Marshall, American businessman, founded Marshalls (died 2013)
- 1920 – Jadwiga Piłsudska, Polish soldier, pilot, and architect (died 2014)
- 1921 – Marah Halim Harahap, Indonesian military officer, Governor of North Sumatra (died 2015)
- 1922 – Radu Câmpeanu, Romanian politician (died 2016)
- 1924 – Robert A. Roe, American soldier and politician (died 2014)
- 1925 – Harry H. Corbett, Burmese-English actor (died 1982)
- 1928 – Tom Aldredge, American actor (died 2011)
- 1928 – Stanley Baker, Welsh actor and producer (died 1976)
- 1929 – Hayden Fry, American football player and coach (died 2019)
- 1929 – Frank Gehry, Canadian-American architect and designer (died 2025)
- 1929 – John Montague, American-Irish poet and academic (died 2016)
- 1930 – Leon Cooper, American physicist and academic, Nobel Prize laureate (died 2024)
- 1931 – Peter Alliss, English golfer and sportscaster (died 2020)
- 1931 – Gavin MacLeod, American actor, Christian activist, and author (died 2021)
- 1931 – Len Newcombe, Welsh footballer and scout (died 1996)
- 1932 – Don Francks, Canadian actor, singer, and jazz musician (died 2016)
- 1932 – Ernst Hinterseer, Austria retired alpine skier
- 1933 – Rein Taagepera, Estonian political scientist and politician
- 1937 – Jeff Farrell, American swimmer
- 1939 – Daniel C. Tsui, Chinese-American physicist and academic, Nobel Prize laureate
- 1939 – Tommy Tune, American actor, dancer, singer, theatre director, producer, and choreographer
- 1940 – Mario Andretti, Italian-American racing driver
- 1940 – Raymond Pointu, French sports journalist (died 2026)
- 1941 – Alice Brock, American artist, author and restaurateur (died 2024)
- 1941 – Arthur Ngirakelsong, 2nd Chief Justice of Palau (died 2022)
- 1942 – Frank Bonner, American actor and television director (died 2021)
- 1942 – Brian Jones, English guitarist, songwriter, and producer (died 1969)
- 1942 – Oliviero Toscani, Italian photographer (died 2025)
- 1942 – Dino Zoff, Italian footballer
- 1943 – Barbara Acklin, American singer-songwriter (died 1998)
- 1944 – Kelly Bishop, American actress
- 1944 – Edward Greenspan, Canadian lawyer and author (died 2014)
- 1944 – Sepp Maier, German footballer and manager
- 1944 – Storm Thorgerson, English graphic designer (died 2013)
- 1945 – Bubba Smith, American football player and actor (died 2011)
- 1946 – Robin Cook, Scottish educator and politician, Secretary of State for Foreign and Commonwealth Affairs (died 2005)
- 1946 – Syreeta Wright, American singer-songwriter (died 2004)
- 1947 – Salvador Flamenco, Salvadoran footballer
- 1948 – Steven Chu, American physicist and politician, 12th United States Secretary of Energy, Nobel Prize laureate
- 1948 – Bernadette Peters, American actress, singer, and author
- 1948 – Mercedes Ruehl, American actress
- 1949 – Zoia Ceaușescu, Romanian mathematician, daughter of Communist leader Nicolae Ceaușescu and his wife Elena Ceaușescu (died 2006)
- 1952 – William Finn, American composer and lyricist (died 2025)
- 1953 – Luther Burden, American basketball player (died 2015)
- 1953 – Paul Krugman, American economist and academic, Nobel Prize laureate
- 1953 – Ricky Steamboat, American professional wrestler
- 1954 – Brian Billick, American football player, coach, and sportscaster
- 1955 – Adrian Dantley, American basketball player and coach
- 1955 – Gilbert Gottfried, American comedian, actor, and singer (died 2022)
- 1956 – Francis Hughes, Irish Republican, died on hunger strike (died 1981)
- 1956 – Terry Leahy, English businessman
- 1957 – Ian Smith, New Zealand cricketer and sportscaster
- 1957 – John Turturro, American actor and director
- 1957 – Cindy Wilson, American singer-songwriter
- 1958 – Manuel Torres Félix, Mexican criminal and narcotics trafficker (died 2012)
- 1958 – Mark Pavelich, American ice hockey player (died 2021)
- 1958 – David R. Ross, Scottish historian and author (died 2010)
- 1961 – Barry McGuigan, Irish-British boxer
- 1963 – Claudio Chiappucci, Italian cyclist
- 1965 – Mikko Mäkelä, Finnish ice hockey player and coach
- 1966 – Paulo Futre, Portuguese footballer
- 1966 – Archbishop Jovan VI of Ohrid
- 1967 – Colin Cooper, English footballer and manager
- 1969 – Sean Farrel, English footballer
- 1969 – Butch Leitzinger, American race car driver
- 1969 – Robert Sean Leonard, American actor
- 1970 – Daniel Brochu, Canadian actor
- 1970 – Noureddine Morceli, Algerian runner
- 1971 – Junya Nakano, Japanese pianist and composer
- 1972 – Ville Haapasalo, Finnish actor and screenwriter
- 1973 – Eric Lindros, Canadian ice hockey player
- 1973 – Nicolas Minassian, French race car driver
- 1973 – Masato Tanaka, Japanese wrestler
- 1974 – Lee Carsley, English-Irish footballer and manager
- 1974 – Alexander Zickler, German footballer and manager
- 1974 – Gianluca Cherubini, Italian footballer (died 2026)
- 1975 – Mike Rucker, American football player
- 1976 – Francisco Elson, Dutch basketball player
- 1976 – Ali Larter, American actress and model
- 1977 – Jason Aldean, American singer-songwriter
- 1977 – Lance Hoyt, American football player and wrestler
- 1978 – Benjamin Raich, Austrian skier
- 1978 – Jamaal Tinsley, American basketball player
- 1978 – Mariano Zabaleta, Argentinian tennis player
- 1979 – Sébastien Bourdais, French race car driver
- 1979 – Ivo Karlović, Croatian tennis player
- 1980 – Pascal Bosschaart, Dutch footballer
- 1980 – Christian Poulsen, Danish footballer
- 1980 – Tayshaun Prince, American basketball player
- 1981 – Brian Bannister, American baseball player and scout
- 1982 – Isabel Mendes Lopes, Portuguese politician
- 1982 – Natalia Vodianova, Russian-French model and actress
- 1984 – Karolína Kurková, Czech model and actress
- 1984 – Ali Marhyar, French actor, film director and screenwriter
- 1985 – Tim Bresnan, English cricketer
- 1985 – Diego, Brazilian footballer
- 1985 – Jelena Janković, Serbian tennis player
- 1987 – Akito, Japanese professional wrestler
- 1987 – Antonio Candreva, Italian footballer
- 1987 – Josh McRoberts, American basketball player
- 1988 – Aroldis Chapman, Cuban baseball player
- 1989 – Carlos Dunlap, American football player
- 1989 – Charles Jenkins, American basketball player
- 1990 – Takayasu Akira, Japanese sumo wrestler
- 1990 – Ryan Allen, American football player
- 1990 – Sebastian Rudy, German footballer
- 1991 – Ronalds Ķēniņš, Latvian ice hockey player
- 1992 – Annie Bovaird, Canadian actress
- 1993 – Marquis Teague, American basketball player
- 1993 – Éder Álvarez Balanta, Colombian footballer
- 1994 – Alex Caruso, American basketball player
- 1994 – Arkadiusz Milik, Polish footballer
- 1995 – Randy Arozarena, Cuban-Mexican baseball player
- 1996 – Jakub Vrána, Czech ice hockey player
- 1996 – Lucas Boyé, Argentinian footballer
- 1996 – Axel Werner, Argentinian footballer
- 1997 – Chris Lindstrom, American football player
- 1998 – Teun Koopmeiners, Dutch footballer
- 1999 – Luka Dončić, Slovenian basketball player
- 2000 – Moise Kean, Italian footballer
- 2000 – Josip Šutalo, Croatian footballer
- 2005 – Vitor Roque, Brazilian footballer

== Deaths ==
=== Pre-1600 ===
- 628 – Khosrow II, Shah of Iran, Sasanian Empire (born c. 570)

=== 1601–1900 ===
- 1621 – Cosimo II de' Medici, Grand Duke of Tuscany (born 1590)
- 1648 – Christian IV, King of Denmark (born 1577)
- 1729 – Lovro Šitović, Croatian Franciscan and grammarian (born c. 1682)
- 1740 – Pietro Ottoboni, Italian cardinal and patron of the arts (born 1667)
- 1857 – André Dumont, Belgian geologist and academic (born 1809)
- 1882 – Adolf Zytogorski, Polish-British chess master and translator (born c. 1811/1812)

=== 1901–present ===
- 1929 – Clemens von Pirquet, Austrian physician and immunologist (born 1874)
- 1932 – Guillaume Bigourdan, French astronomer and academic (born 1851)
- 1936 – Charles Nicolle, French biologist and academic, Nobel Prize laureate (born 1866)
- 1955 – Isak Penttala, Finnish politician (born 1883)
- 1966 – Charles Bassett, American captain, engineer, and astronaut (born 1931)
- 1966 – Elliot See, American commander, engineer, and astronaut (born 1927)
- 1975 – Neville Cardus, English cricket and music writer (born 1888)
- 1977 – Eddie "Rochester" Anderson, American actor and comedian (born 1905)
- 1978 – Zara Cully, American actress (born 1892)
- 1993 – Ruby Keeler, Canadian-American actress and dancer (born 1909)
- 1998 – Arkady Shevchenko, Ukrainian diplomat (born 1930)
- 2002 – Mary Stuart, American actress and singer (born 1926)
- 2002 – Helmut Zacharias, German violinist and composer (born 1920)
- 2003 – Chris Brasher, Guyanese-English runner and journalist, co-founded the London Marathon (born 1928)
- 2004 – Daniel J. Boorstin, American historian and librarian (born 1914)
- 2005 – Chris Curtis, English singer and drummer (born 1941)
- 2006 – Owen Chamberlain, American physicist and academic, Nobel Prize laureate (born 1920)
- 2007 – Arthur M. Schlesinger, Jr. American historian and critic (born 1917)
- 2009 – Paul Harvey, American radio host (born 1918)
- 2011 – Annie Girardot, French actress (born 1931)
- 2013 – Donald A. Glaser, American physicist and biologist, Nobel Prize laureate (born 1926)
- 2014 – Hugo Brandt Corstius, Dutch linguist and author (born 1935)
- 2015 – Yaşar Kemal, Turkish journalist and author (born 1923)
- 2016 – George Kennedy, American actor (born 1925)
- 2019 – André Previn, German-American pianist, conductor, and composer. (born 1929)
- 2020 – Joe Coulombe, founder of Trader Joe's (born 1930)
- 2020 – Freeman Dyson, British-born American physicist and mathematician (born 1923)
- 2020 – Sir Lenox Hewitt, Australian public servant (born 1917)
- 2024 – Ahmed Salim, Bangladeshi convicted murderer (born 1989)
- 2024 – Héctor Ortiz, Puerto Rican baseball player and coach (born 1969)
- 2024 – Cat Janice, American singer-songwriter (born 1993)
- 2025 – David Johansen, American singer-songwriter and actor (born 1950)
- 2025 – Miguel Piñera, Chilean celebrity, night club owner and amateur musician (born 1954)
- 2025 – Joseph Wambaugh, American writer (born 1937)
- 2026 – Ali Khamenei, Supreme Leader of Iran (born 1939)
- 2026 – Aziz Nasirzadeh, Minister of Defense of the Islamic Republic of Iran (born 1964)
- 2026 – Mohammad Pakpour, commander of the Islamic Revolutionary Guard Corps of the Islamic Republic of Iran (born 1961)

== Holidays and observances ==
- Christian feast day:
  - February 28 (Eastern Orthodox liturgics)
- Kalevala Day, also known as the Finnish Culture Day (Finland)
- National Science Day (India)
- Peace Memorial Day (Taiwan)
- Andalusia Day (Spain)
