= February 1948 =

Month of 1948

<<	February 1948					>>
Su	Mo	Tu	We	Th	Fr	Sa
1	2	3	4	5	6	7
8	9	10	11	12	13	14
15	16	17	18	19	20	21
22	23	24	25	26	27	28
29

The following events occurred in February 1948:

== February 1, 1948 (Sunday) ==
- The Federation of Malaya was created from nine Malay states and two British Straits Settlements.
- Arabs bombed the offices of the Palestine Post newspaper in Jerusalem, killing 20 Jews.
- The Chicago Sun and Chicago Daily Times newspapers merged to form the Chicago Sun-Times.
- The novel Cry, the Beloved Country by Alan Paton was published in New York City.
- Born: Rick James, musician and producer, in Buffalo, New York (d. 2004)
- Died: Jatindramohan Bagchi, 69, Bengali poet and editor

== February 2, 1948 (Monday) ==
- Seeking to prevent further unrest in the wake of Gandhi's assassination, the Indian government banned all private armies and organizations preaching violence or communal hatred.
- Born: Ina Garten, author and television host, in Brooklyn, New York; Roger Williamson, racing driver, in Ashby-de-la-Zouch, England (d. 1973)
- Died: Bevil Rudd, 53, South African athlete

== February 3, 1948 (Tuesday) ==
- Fritz Kuhn mysteriously escaped from Dachau internment camp where he was being held while awaiting his denazification trial.
- The Queensland railway strike began in Australia.
- Futaba Corporation was founded in Japan.
- Born: Carlos Filipe Ximenes Belo, Roman Catholic bishop, in Baucau, Portuguese Timor; Henning Mankell, crime novelist, in Stockholm, Sweden (d. 2015)

== February 4, 1948 (Wednesday) ==
- A general election was held in Ireland for 147 seats in the lower house of parliament, Dáil Éireann. Fianna Fáil remained the largest party, but lost 8 seats and its absolute majority.
- The British colony of Ceylon achieved independence when the Dominion of Ceylon was proclaimed.
- Born: Alice Cooper, musician and actor, as Vincent Furnier in Detroit, Michigan; Ram Baran Yadav, 1st President of Nepal, in Sapahi, Janakpur, Nepal

== February 5, 1948 (Thursday) ==
- US Attorney General Tom C. Clark testified before a House Un-American Activities subcommittee in Washington that he opposed outlawing the American Communist Party but endorsed the idea of requiring communists to register as agents of a foreign power.
- Born: Sven-Göran Eriksson, footballer and manager, in Sunne, Sweden (d. 2024); Christopher Guest, actor, filmmaker and comedian, in New York City; Barbara Hershey, actress, as Barbara Herzstein in Hollywood, California; Tom Wilkinson, actor, in Wharfedale, West Riding of Yorkshire, England (d. 2023)
- Died: Johannes Blaskowitz, 64, German general (committed suicide by breaking away from his guards and throwing himself off the balcony of the Nuremberg court building during his trial for war crimes)

== February 6, 1948 (Friday) ==
- British Prime Minister Clement Attlee made a radio broadcast encouraging the people to support the government's wage stabilization program, warning that failure of the drive to increase production and exports would mean mass unemployment and "real, desperate hunger."
- Died: Otto von Stülpnagel, 69, German general (committed suicide in the Cherche-Midi prison)

== February 7, 1948 (Saturday) ==
- The post of Chief of Staff of the United States Army formally passed from Dwight D. Eisenhower to Omar Bradley in a ceremony at the Pentagon attended by President Harry S. Truman.
- Former British Union of Fascists leader Oswald Mosley announced the creation of the Union Movement, a merger of fifty-one different organizations. Speaking at a rally in a London school building before about 300 supporters, Mosley distanced his new public image from the Fascist movement by wearing a grey suit instead of the old black shirt, although the old BUF logo of a lightning bolt in a circle was retained.
- The comedy film If You Knew Susie starring Eddie Cantor and Joan Davis was released.

== February 8, 1948 (Sunday) ==
- General elections were held in Costa Rica. Opposition candidate Otilio Ulate Blanco apparently defeated the incumbent Rafael Ángel Calderón Guardia for the presidency, but the result would be deemed fraudulent and annulled by Congress, leading to the Costa Rican Civil War a few weeks later.
- The closing ceremonies of the 1948 Winter Olympics were held in St. Moritz, Switzerland. Norway and Sweden tied for first place in the final medal count with 4 gold medals, 3 silvers and 3 bronzes each.
- Italy released the list of warships to be divided among the Soviet Union, France, Yugoslavia, Greece and Albania under the terms of the 1947 Peace Treaty. The USSR would get the largest share of ships with 45, including the only battleship, Giulio Cesare.
- Born: Jan Góra, Roman Catholic Priest, in Prudnik, Poland (d. 2015)

== February 9, 1948 (Monday) ==
- In a speech on the floor of Congress, Mississippi Senator James Eastland blasted President Truman's civil rights program and proposed that Southern Democrats nominate an independent candidate to run against him. "We find the national Democratic leadership today attempting to barter the South's social institutions for the political favors of mongrel Northern minority groups in politically doubtful states," Eastland said. "We are expected to remain docile while the pure blood of the South is mongrelized by the barter of our heritage by Northern politicians in order to secure political favors from Red mongrels in the slums of the cities of the East and Middle West."
- The Flag of Guam was adopted.
- Born: David Hayman, actor and director, in Glasgow, Scotland
- Died: Burns Mantle, 74, American theatre critic; Karl Valentin, 65, Bavarian actor and comedian

== February 10, 1948 (Tuesday) ==
- The border between France and Spain was formally reopened after France gave up on its two-year attempt to impose an economic blockade that other nations refused to participate in.
- In St. John's, Newfoundland, a building being used as an infirmary caught fire. 33 patients died in the blaze.
- Born: John Magnier, business magnate, in Fermoy, Ireland

== February 11, 1948 (Wednesday) ==
- The Central Committee of the Communist Party of the Soviet Union issued a decree criticizing the composers Dmitri Shostakovich, Sergei Prokofiev and Aram Katchaturian for failing to heed warnings and instructions for the elimination of "bourgeois" influences in their music. A new program was outlined for everyone in the Soviet music world to follow, "the foundation of which is recognition of the huge, progressive role of the classic heritage and especially of the traditions of the Russian musical school."
- Born: Chris Rush, comedian, in Brooklyn, New York (d. 2018)
- Died: Sergei Eisenstein, 50, Soviet filmmaker; Isaac Isaacs, 92, 3rd Chief Justice of Australia

== February 12, 1948 (Thursday) ==
- The ashes of Mahatma Gandhi were cast upon the sacred Ganges River at Allahabad. The crowd that packed the banks of the river and the ancient city was estimated at 2 to 3 million.
- 4,000 Democrats meeting in Jackson, Mississippi unanimously adopted a resolution calling upon "all true white Jeffersonian Democrats" to assemble for a nationwide conference to unite against President Truman's civil rights program.
- Born: Ray Kurzweil, author, scientist and inventor, in Queens, New York

== February 13, 1948 (Friday) ==
- A London policeman was slain for the first time in twenty-eight years when Constable Nathaniel Edgar was shot by a suspect he was questioning about a recent spate of burglaries in the Southgate area. The murder inspired the 1950 police drama film The Blue Lamp.
- The US Senate Foreign Relations Committee authorized $5.3 billion to cover the first twelve months of the Marshall Plan from April 1.
- Born: Kitten Natividad, actress, in Ciudad Juárez, Mexico (d. 2022)

== February 14, 1948 (Saturday) ==
- The United States and Britain agreed to permit German manufacturers to produce virgin aluminum, which had been prohibited under the Potsdam Agreement.
- Born: Wally Tax, singer and songwriter, in Amsterdam, Netherlands (d. 2005); Raymond Teller, illusionist and half of the comedy magic duo Penn & Teller, in Philadelphia, Pennsylvania; Yehuda Shoenfeld, physician and autoimmunity researcher, in Slovakia
- Died: Mordecai Brown, 71, American baseball player

== February 15, 1948 (Sunday) ==
- Juan Natalicio González was elected President of Paraguay, running as the only candidate on the ballot. Non-voters were subjected to fines and any attempt to write in a different candidate automatically voided the ballot.
- The Royal Navy cruiser HMS Nigeria was sent to the Falkland Islands after Argentina and Chile rejected British protests against setting up posts and naval bases on territories that the British considered theirs.
- Zionist terrorists raided the Palestinian settlement of Sa'sa' in upper Galilee, killing 30 Palestinians, including 10 children, and blew up bridges.
- Born: Ron Cey, baseball player, in Tacoma, Washington
- Died: Subhadra Kumari Chauhan, 43, Indian poet (car accident)

== February 16, 1948 (Monday) ==
- The United Nations Palestine Commission told the Security Council that the plan to partition Palestine could not be carried out unless the Commission received "military forces in adequate strength."
- At McDonald Observatory in Texas, astronomer Gerard Kuiper discovered the smallest moon of the planet Uranus. He named it Miranda after the character from Shakespeare's The Tempest.
- The TV news program Camel News Caravan premiered on NBC under its original title, NBC Television Newsreel.

== February 17, 1948 (Tuesday) ==
- The Alwaziri coup began when an attempt was launched to overthrow the dynastic rule of the Mutawakkilite Kingdom of Yemen.
- Rómulo Gallegos became President of Venezuela.
- Born: György Cserhalmi, actor, in Budapest, Hungary; José José, singer and actor, as José Ortiz in Mexico City (d. 2019)
- Died: Yahya Muhammad Hamid ed-Din, 78, Imam of the Zaydis and Yemen (assassinated in the Alwaziri coup)

== February 18, 1948 (Wednesday) ==
- Éamon de Valera's 16-year premiership of Ireland came to a stunning end when he was voted out of office by the Dáil, 75–70. A new vote was immediately taken and John A. Costello was elected Taoiseach by a vote of 75–68, making him the leader of Ireland's first coalition government.
- In Moscow, the Soviet Union and Hungary signed a 20-year mutual assistance and co-operation pact.
- The novel The Ides of March by Thornton Wilder was published.
- Born: Sinéad Cusack, actress, in Dalkey, Dublin, Ireland

== February 19, 1948 (Thursday) ==
- The Hostages Trial ended in Nuremberg, in which German generals of the Balkan Campaign stood trial for war crimes. Eight defendants received prison sentences ranging from seven years to life, while two were acquitted.
- The five-day Conference of Youth and Students of Southeast Asia Fighting for Freedom and Independence opened in Calcutta, India.
- Born: Pim Fortuyn, politician, in Driehuis, Netherlands (d. 2002); Tony Iommi, guitarist and founding member of the heavy metal band Black Sabbath, in Handsworth, Birmingham, England

== February 20, 1948 (Friday) ==
- A governmental crisis began in Czechoslovakia when three of the five parties in Prime Minister Klement Gottwald's cabinet withdrew their ministers over the appointment of eight Communists to head the eight police districts in and around Prague.
- Born: Jennifer O'Neill, actress, and model, in Rio de Janeiro, Brazil

== February 21, 1948 (Saturday) ==
- The 1948 Czechoslovak coup d'état began. President Edvard Beneš issued a statement regarded as recognizing the Communists' right to head the government but barring them from establishing a totalitarian regime. His letter explained that any new government would still be led by Klement Gottwald, but that Beneš' duty as president was "to convince the political parties not to separate but to work together."
- Hitoshi Ashida was elected Prime Minister of Japan by the House of Representatives.
- The Progressive Party was formed in Lansing, Michigan to support the presidential bid of Henry A. Wallace.
- The National Association for Stock Car Auto Racing (NASCAR) was founded by Bill France Sr. with the help of several other drivers.
- "I'm Looking Over a Four Leaf Clover" by Art Mooney and His Orchestra hit #1 on the Billboard singles charts.

== February 22, 1948 (Sunday) ==
- Ben Yehuda Street bombings: Palestinian Arabs planted two truckloads of explosives in the Jewish sector of Jerusalem, destroying a three-block area resulting in about 54 deaths and 200 injuries.
- In Vienna, US and British diplomats walked out on a celebration of the 30th anniversary of the Red Army at the Musikverein when Russian High Commissioner in Austria L. V. Kurasov accused "imperialistic" powers of helping Germany launch World War II and of plotting a new war against the Soviet Union.
- Born: John Ashton, actor, in Springfield, Massachusetts (d. 2024); Leslie H. Sabo Jr., American Medal of Honor recipient, in Kufstein, Austria (d. 1970)

== February 23, 1948 (Monday) ==
- Czechoslovakia's Communist Minister of the Interior and Minister of War claimed that groups within the National Social Party, the second-largest in the country, were conspiring for an armed revolt against the state. An order from the Interior Ministry forbade Czechoslovak citizens from leaving the country without a special passport stamp, while Police occupied and thoroughly searched the National Social party's headquarters in Prague and confiscated a number of documents. A statement was issued that same day on behalf of President Beneš asking "all citizens to maintain calm and order and to continue to work. He assures everyone that he acts in accord with the principles of parliamentary democracy and that he works to the end that all parties of the National Front seek to find unity to renew the collaboration of the whole National Front."
- Idaho Senator Glen H. Taylor announced in a radio address that he was quitting the Democrats and joining the new Progressive Party. "I am not leaving the Democratic Party," Taylor declared. "It left me. Wall Street and the military have taken over."
- Died: John Robert Gregg, 80, American educator and inventor of the Gregg Shorthand writing system

== February 24, 1948 (Tuesday) ==
- In Czechoslovakia, Communist action committees took over all offices and departments headed by non-Communists as well as opposition newspapers and political headquarters.
- Born: Jayalalithaa, actor and politician, in Mandya, India (d. 2016); Walter Smith, footballer and manager, in Lanark, Scotland (d. 2021)

== February 25, 1948 (Wednesday) ==
- The Czechoslovak coup d'état ended when President Beneš capitulated to the Communists and agreed to approve a new cabinet composed of Communists and their supporters.
- Born: Shakuntala Baliarsingh, writer and translator, in Khordha district, India; Danny Denzongpa, actor, singer and film director, in Gangtok, Kingdom of Sikkim
- Died: Alexander du Toit, 69, South African geologist

== February 26, 1948 (Thursday) ==
- The United States, Great Britain and France issued a joint statement condemning the Czechoslovak coup, calling it engineered "by means of a crisis artificially and deliberately instigated."
- The Argentine foreign ministry said that Argentina would refuse to negotiate with Britain over the Falkland Islands, which it claimed to be unquestionably Argentine territory.

== February 27, 1948 (Friday) ==
- The Soviet Union asked Finland to enter a mutual military assistance pact "as quickly as possible."
- The US House of Representatives voted to cut President Truman's budget by $2.5 billion.
- Died: Patriarch Nicodim of Romania, 83.

== February 28, 1948 (Saturday) ==
- The Accra riots began in Accra in the British colony of the Gold Coast after police broke up a protest march of unarmed ex-servicemen demanding the pensions they'd been promised for their service in World War II. Three of the ex-soldiers were killed: Sergeant Cornelius Adjetey, Corporal Patrick Attipoe and Private Odartey Lamptey.
- Born: Steven Chu, physicist and 12th United States Secretary of Energy, in St. Louis, Missouri; Mike Figgis, filmmaker and composer, in Carlisle, Cumbria, England; Kjell Isaksson, pole vaulter, in Härnösand, Sweden; Bernadette Peters, actress and singer, in Ozone Park, Queens, New York; Mercedes Ruehl, actor, in Jackson Heights, Queens, New York; Alfred Sant, 11th Prime Minister of Malta and novelist, in Pietà, Malta
- Died: Gerhard Flesch, 38, German SS officer (executed by firing squad for war crimes)

== February 29, 1948 (Sunday) ==
- The House Foreign Affairs subcommittee published a report titled Strategy and Tactics of World Communism which concluded that world revolution was the goal of communism.
- The first of the two Cairo–Haifa train bombings were carried out by the Jewish militant group Lehi, killing 28 British soldiers.
- Born: Ken Foree, actor, in Indianapolis, Indiana; Henry Small, musician and radio personality, in Beacon, New York; Ruby Wilson, blues and gospel singer and actress, in Fort Worth, Texas (d. 2016)
- Died: François Sevez, 56, French general (shot in a hunting accident)
