= Operation Jizerka =

Location	Jizera Mountains, Czechoslovakia
Result	StB-SNB victory

Belligerents
Czechoslovakia: StB; SNB	Junák

Commanders and leaders
	Jiří Haba †

Strength
300 policemen	7 people

Casualties and losses
none	2 killed and 5 wounded who were captured

Operation Jizerka was the cover name for a Czechoslovak StB (secret police) operation in 1949 against members of Junák. It included an attack by StB and SNB units against the camp of Železný Brod scouts on the slopes of the Vlašský hřeben, which is part of the Vysoký jizerský hřbet, which claimed two lives, and the subsequent trial.

== Decline of Junák ==
After February 1948, when the Communist Party took over power in Czechoslovakia, social organizations were united into a unified structure under the control of the Communists. In 1948, the Czechoslovak Junák was officially integrated into the Československý svaz mládeže. However, many members of Junák did not want to be members of the CSM. Several members of the Junák organization in Železný Brod, which was among the largest in the region, decided to continue living according to Scout principles beyond the borders of Czechoslovakia, further encouraged by signals that their arrest was about to take place. In total, seven people eventually decided to go abroad, six of whom were only around 18 years old.

== Attack ==
According to the official version, the camp was discovered thanks to a Slovak forest worker, but it is likely that the StB knew about everything before Jiří Hilger and that, with the help of double agent Hilger, she actually organized everything herself as a provocation. Hilger acted as an agent of the US CIC.

On the night of July 24, 1949, the camp was surrounded by approximately three hundred members of the StB and SNB, who launched an attack in the morning using firearms including machine guns. Although there were approximately five pistols in the camp, only Jiří Haba defended himself with a weapon, who did not survive the attack just like Tomáš Hübner. Haba's tent or cabin was completely blown apart by machine guns. According to the communist version of the event, Haba shot Hübner and then himself, which, according to one of the participants in the event, Radomil Raja, was practically impossible. The other inhabitants of the camp were forced to lie on the ground between the tents and only then were they hit from close range by gunfire.

In his memoirs, Raja states that in between shooting the helpless scouts, he heard one of the members say the sentence: "Comrade or comrades, don't be a pig, we also need some live ones."

== Trial ==
In addition, after the attack ended, several dozen people from the surrounding area were charged with aiding and abetting the crimes and widespread arrests took place. For the following trial, the official version of the event was manipulated, according to which the scouts were to participate in the preparations of an armed coup in Czechoslovakia, using the fortresses of the border fortifications, and were also going to blow up the dry water reservoir. One of the members of the group, Jindřich Kokoška, himself claimed that the intention of the group was indeed an armed struggle against the communist regime, but the others insisted that they just wanted to get across the border.

The trial took place in October 1949 in Prague. Robert Hofrichter was sentenced to 20 years, Václav Hlava and Josef Klapáč to 10 years, Jindřich Kokoška and František Linka to eight years, Radomil Raja, Josef Šírek and Jiří Žídek to two and a half years, nine other young people were sentenced to one year imprisonment.

According to Radomil Raja, the residents of Železný Brod accused of aiding and abetting received additional sentences of over ten years, but this is disputed by the memories of Jaromír Hádek, one of the people convicted of aiding and abetting.

== Memorial ==
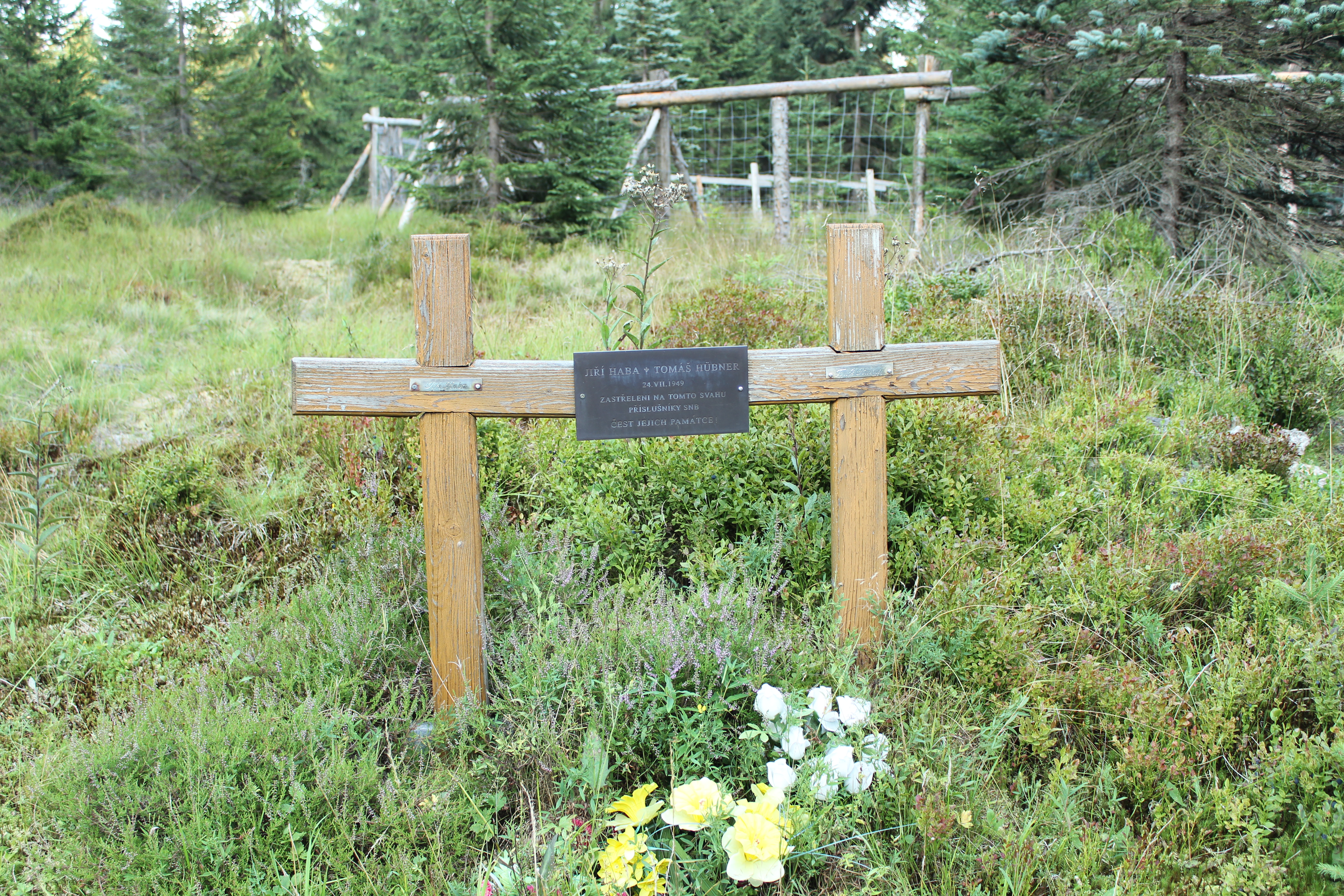
Cross commemorating Haba and Hübner

Tomáš Hübner and Jiří Hába were buried secretly so that even their relatives did not know where their final resting place was. Only after 1990, thanks to the memories of witnesses, their remains were picked up and moved to the graves of their parents.

The memory of Hübner and Hába is commemorated by a double cross with a commemorative plaque on the road from Smědava to the Souš reservoir.
