= Obetsebi =

Obetsebi is a surname of Ghanaian origin. Notable people with this surname include:

- Emmanuel Obetsebi-Lamptey (1902–1963), Ghanaian politician
- Jacob Otanka Obetsebi-Lamptey (1946–2016), Ghanaian politician, television and radio producer, and businessman, son of Emmanuel
