= Big Six (Ghana) =

Leaders of the United Gold Coast Convention and the Founding Fathers of Ghana

The Big Six were six leaders of the United Gold Coast Convention (UGCC), one of the leading political parties in the British colony of the Gold Coast (modern-day Ghana), which successfully fought for independence from Britain. They were detained by the colonial authorities in 1948 following disturbances in the city of Accra that led to the killing of three World War II veterans. In 1957, Ghana became an independent Commonwealth nation. The Big Six was depicted on the banknotes of the Ghanaian cedi, until 2026 following the introduction of the heritage series.

== The Big Six ==
Considered the founding fathers of present-day Ghana, the members of the Big Six were:

- Kwame Nkrumah – first prime minister and first president of Ghana
- Ako Adjei – founding member of the UGCC
- Edward Akufo-Addo – founding member of the UGCC and subsequently chief justice and president of Ghana
- Joseph Boakye Danquah – founding member of the UGCC
- Emmanuel Obetsebi-Lamptey – founding member of the UGCC
- William Ofori Atta – founding member of the UGCC

== Background ==
=== AWAM boycott ===
An organized boycott of European imports took place in January 1948. The aim was to get the foreign traders known as the Association of West African Merchants (AWAM) to reduce the prices of their goods. This was followed by a series of riots in early February 1948. The boycotts were scheduled to end on 28 February 1948, a day that has become significant in the history of Ghana. AWAM has become a term synonymous with cheating or profiteering in Ghana.

=== Christianborg cross-roads shooting ===
On 20 February 1948, Dr. Nkrumah and Dr. J. B. Danquah met and addressed World War II veterans who had been agitating for their end-of-service benefits following World War II at the Palladium Cinema, Accra. These veterans had fought with the Gold Coast Regiment of the Royal West African Frontier Force and had not been paid their gratuities on their return home. Nkrumah and Danquah both gave their support and encouraged the veterans in their protest over their post-war neglect.

On 28 February, what became known as the "Christianborg Cross-Roads shooting" occurred. Some Second World War veterans marched to Christianborg Castle, the seat of the colonial government. They intended to submit a petition to the Governor, Sir Gerald Creasy, about their poor conditions, unpaid war benefits and neglect. Police Superintendent Colin Imray, a British police officer, ordered the veterans to disperse, but they refused. He then ordered his men to open fire on the unarmed soldiers and, when they refused, opened fire himself, killing three of them, namely Sergeant Cornelius Frederick Adjetey, Private Odartey Lamptey and Corporal Attipoe. This led to another round of riots and looting in Accra during which foreign (European and Asian) stores were looted. The riots lasted for five days.

=== Arrest ===
On the same day, following these disturbances, the United Gold Coast Convention (UGCC) leaders sent a cable to the Secretary of State in London.

"...unless Colonial Government is changed and a new Government of the people and their Chiefs installed at the centre immediately, the conduct of masses now completely out of control with strikes threatened in Police quarters, and rank and file Police indifferent to orders of Officers, will continue and result in worse violent and irresponsible acts by uncontrolled people.

"Working Committee United Gold Coast Convention declare they are prepared and ready to take over interim Government. We ask in name of oppressed, inarticulate, misruled and misgoverned people and their Chiefs that Special Commissioner be sent out immediately to hand over Government to interim Government of Chief and People and to witness immediate calling of Constituent Assembly."

They also blamed Sir Gerald Creasy (whom they called "Crazy Creasy") for the riots, due to his handling of the country's problems.

On 1 March 1948, the Riot Act was read. After that, a Removal Order was issued by Sir Gerald for the arrest of the six leaders of the UGCC, who were held in the remote northern part of the Gold Coast following their arrests. A commission of enquiry, named the Watson Commission and chaired by Mr Brian Otwerebemah, was established to investigate the riots. Members of the Watson Commission included Dr Keith Murray, Mr Andrew Dalgleish and Mr E. G. Hanrott.

Following their incarceration, the nationalists became known as the Big Six, while their popularity increased.

On 8 March 1948, some teachers and students demonstrated against the detention of the Big Six but these demonstrators were dismissed. Upon his release, Dr. Nkrumah set up a secondary school, Ghana National College in Cape Coast, for the dismissed staff and students.
