= Gaddiel Robert Acquaah =

Ghanaian composer, scholar and minister

- Born: 25 July 1884; Anomabu, Gold Coast (prior to 1957), Ghana (post 1957)
- Died: 25 March 1954 (aged 69); Accra, Gold Coast (prior to 1957), Ghana (post 1957)
- Occupations: Composer, Methodist minister, scholar
- Spouse: Sarah D. Hammond (married 1913)

Gaddiel Robert Acquaah (25 July 1884 – 25 March 1954) was a Ghanaian composer, Christian scholar and Methodist minister.

== Early life ==
Acquaah was born in Anomabu, in the British colony of the Gold Coast, in what is now the central region of Ghana. He was the second of eight siblings. His father, Robert Mensah Acquaah, a Methodist minister, died in August 1925, by which time Acquaah at 41 years old was a practicing minister with the Methodist church His mother, Charlotte Oyemam Acquaah, born in 1858, died on 31 July 1908. He attended the Cape Coast Wesleyan Collegiate School.

== Career ==
In 1912 Acquaah was ordained a Methodist minister and also appointed chairman of the Methodist Bible Translation Committee. During this period he commenced translating the Bible into Fante. Due to disagreements about orthography the translation took more than 30 years and was not completed until 1944.

In October 1913 the Gold Coast Nation reports on his musical skills as led a group of Wesleyan choristers at the funeral of Mrs. T. M. Bilson.

Acquaah was Superintendent of the Kumasi circuit for the Methodist church in the Gold Coast. On 13 October 1925 he presided over the opening and dedication of the Wesleyan Church in Saltpond also in the central region.

In May 1938 Wesley bi-centenary celebrations were held in the Gold Coast. Acquaah played a central role in arranging the celebrations which took place over several days. He produced several programmes and commemorative brochures including a booklet of Fante lyrics for the occasion. He sent out invites to various dignitaries, gave sermons and conducted the choir.

On the last page of one booklet he wrote:

Methodist tunes and African lyrics that recall to mind the early years of the work of the Methodist Church in England and in the Gold Coast must as far as practicable be used in all the Meetings.

Acquaah wrote many other literary works in Fante including a 43 page booklet about John Wesley which is held in the archives of SOAS library.

In an article about the poem Oguaa Aban (which means Cape Coast Castle in English) written in Fante by Acquaah, Nana Wilson-Tagoe wrote that "a conscious attempt to invest the Fante language with literary authority" was amongst Acquaah's reasons for writing in Fante. From the article by Wilson-Tagoe we also learn that the 1,364 lines long poem, published in 1938, was a popular text in schools in Cape Coasts right up to independence.

Acquaah was awarded an Order of the British Empire (OBE) in the Queens 1952 Birthday Honours.

== Coussey Committee ==
In 1948 disturbances and disorder broke out in the Gold Coast triggered by a number of factors including the colonial police shooting unarmed veterans who had staged a peaceful protest about unpaid pensions after they were demobilised at the end of second world war. Three of the veterans were killed. The committee appointed to look into the disturbances recommended constitutional reform. This led the governor to appoint a committee to draft a new constitution. Acquaah was one of 39 Africans appointed to the committee headed by James Coussey. It's reported that each committee member received expenses of £1,000.

== Personal life ==
Aquaah married Sarah D Hammond, a school teacher, on 7 April 1913. He was 28 and she was 22 years of age. They had six children. His father-in-law was John Oboboam Hammond (2 February 1860 – 28 December 1918) also a Methodist minister and brother to his mother Charlotte Acquaah (nee Hammond).

== Later life ==
Acquaah died in Accra on 25 March 1954, three years before the Gold Coast gained independence becoming Ghana. He was 69 years old.
