= Alan Burns (colonial administrator) =

British civil servant (1887–1980)

Sir Alan Burns GCMG
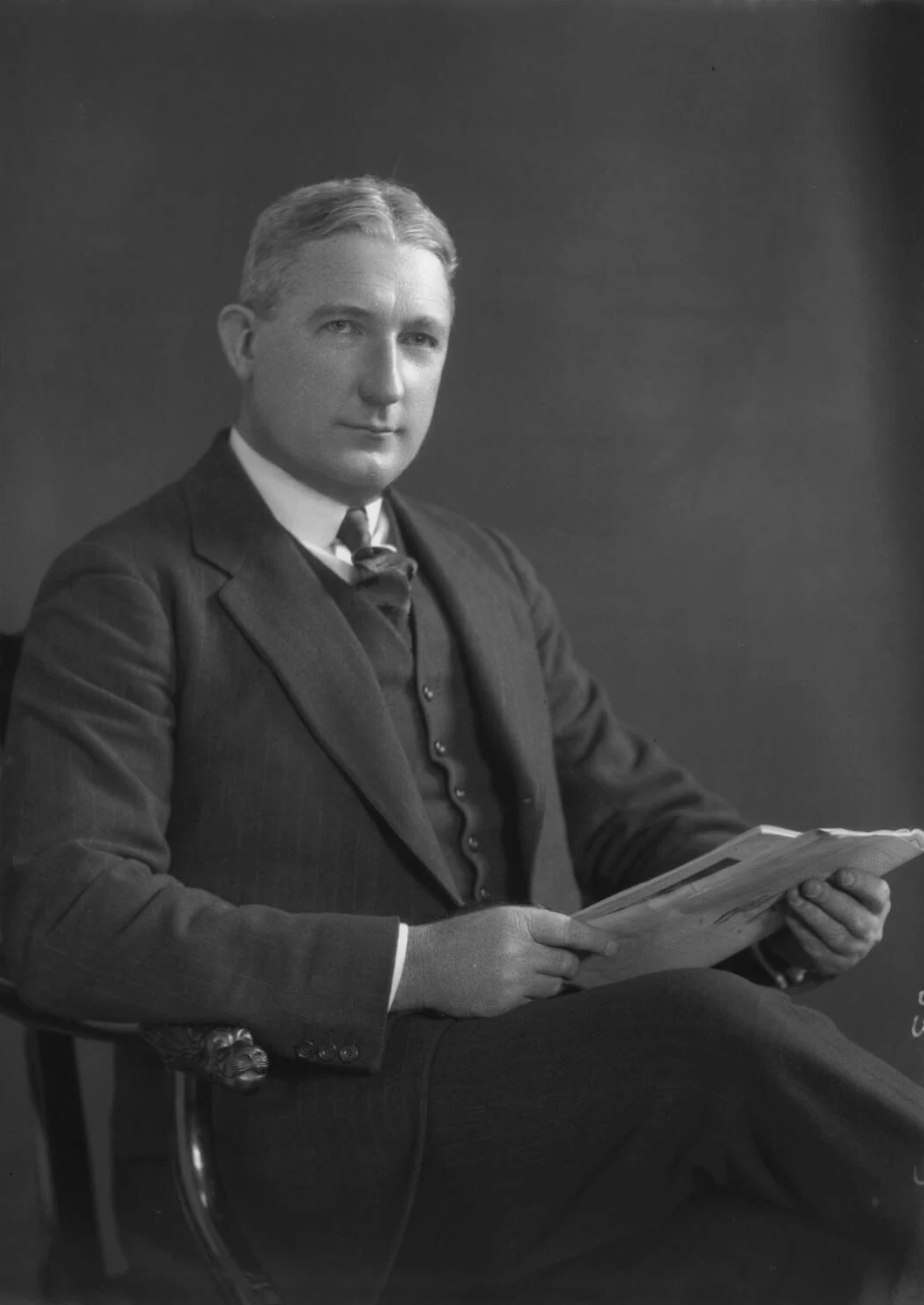
- 1928 portrait of Burns

Permanent Representative of the United Kingdom on the UN Trusteeship Council
- In office 1947–1956

Governor of the Gold Coast
- In office 24 October 1941 – 2 August 1947
- Monarch: George VI
- Preceded by: Sir Arnold Weinholt Hodson
- Succeeded by: Sir Gerald Hallen Creasy

Assistant Under-Secretary for the Colonial Office
- In office 1940–1941

Governor of British Honduras
- In office 2 November 1934 – 24 February 1939
- Preceded by: Sir Harold Baxter Kittermaster
- Succeeded by: John Adams Hunter

Deputy Chief Secretary to the Government of Nigeria
- In office 1929–1934

Colonial Secretary of the Bahamas
- In office 1924–1929

Personal details
- Born: Alan Cuthbert Maxwell Burns; 9 November 1887 Basseterre, Saint Kitts
- Died: 29 September 1980 (aged 92) Westminster, London, England
- Spouse: Kathleen Fitzpatrick Hardtman (m. 1914; died 1970)
- Children: 2

Sir Alan Cuthbert Maxwell Burns GCMG (9 November 1887 – 29 September 1980) was a British civil servant who rose through the ranks to become governor of several colonies. He also wrote a number of books on politics and history, including a book on what he called "colour prejudice" (racism), in which he criticised the practice.

== Early life and family ==
Burns was born in Basseterre, Saint Kitts and Nevis, and had seven siblings. His father was James Patrick Burns and his mother was Agnes Zulma Delisle Burns. His father was treasurer of Saint Christopher-Nevis-Anguilla and died in 1896. Among his siblings were Cecil Delisle Burns, a secularist writer and lecturer; Robert Edward Burns, who also worked in the Colonial Service; and Emile Burns, a leading British Communist.

In 1901 Burns matriculated at St Edmund's College in Old Hall Green, but he had to leave early as his family could not afford the fees. His mother died in Hertfordshire in 1914. In the same year he married Kathleen Fitzpatrick Hardtman. They had two daughters, Barbara and Benedicta.

== Career ==
Burns held several posts in the Colonial Service. He served in the Leeward Islands from 1905 to 1912 and then became Supervisor of Customs in Nigeria. In 1914 he enlisted in the West Africa Frontier Force. He served in the Cameroons Campaign and became Adjutant of the Nigeria Land Contingent. Burns was Private Secretary to Sir Frederick (later Lord) Lugard then Hugh Clifford during their times as governors of Nigeria.

In 1924 Burns was appointed Colonial Secretary of the Bahamas, where he served until 1929 and carried out the duties of Governor on several occasions. From 1929 to 1934 he was Deputy Chief Secretary to the Government of Nigeria. Then, at the age of 47, was posted to British Honduras, where he was Governor from 2 November 1934 until 24 February 1939. In 1940 he was seconded to the Colonial Office on special duties, with the rank of Assistant Under-Secretary.

Burns was appointed Governor of the Gold Coast in 1941. In 1942 he served for five months as Acting Governor of Nigeria. He then returned to the Gold Coast, where in 1942 he persuaded the Colonial Office to admit Africans onto the Executive Council of the colony. In 1946 he inspired a new constitution under which the Legislative Council came to consist of six ex officio members, six nominated members and eighteen elected members. As a result there was an African majority on the Council.

In 1943 a ritual murder took place in Kyebi. A jury consisting of six Gold Coast natives and one European convicted eight men of murder, but the accused had a well-funded defence, led by J. B. Danquah, a lawyer who was a nationalist politician and a relative of some of the accused. The defence launched appeals to the UK and attempted to portray the trial as a case of "white oppression". He received a degree of support from some politicians in the UK and the case dragged on for years. Burns resigned as Governor shortly after the Judicial Committee of the Privy Council rejected the final appeal in the case.

From 1947 until his retirement in 1956 Burns served as Permanent Representative of the UK on the United Nations Trusteeship Council. In 1959, at the age of 72, he headed a Commission of Enquiry into the Natural Resources and Population Trends of the Colony of Fiji. In 1966 Burns used his contacts to ensure a safe exit for his niece Dr Marca Burns from Ghana during a coup.

Burns died at Westminster Hospital in London.

== Publications ==
Burns wrote a number of books and an article for a journal. He was also instrumental in founding the Lagos Library in 1932. While most people were excluded from the Library by its high subscription fees, it differed from many other similar institutions by allowing Africans to become members.

In his book Colour Prejudice Burns wrote that colour prejudice (racism)

"is nothing more than the unreasoning hatred of one race for another, the contempt of the stronger and richer people for those whom they consider inferior to themselves, and the bitter resentment of those who are kept in subjection and are so frequently insulted. As colour is the most obvious outward manifestation of race, it has been made the criterion by which men are judged, irrespective of their social or educational attainments. The light-skinned races have come to despise all those of a darker colour, and the dark-skinned people will no longer accept without protest the inferior position to which they have been relegated."

Burns's book Colonial Civil Servant is a collection of reminiscences of his career.

=== Books ===
- Colour Prejudice (1948)
- History of Nigeria (1948)
- Colonial Civil Servant (1949)
- History of the British West Indies (1954)
- In Defence of Colonies (1957)
- Fiji:The Corona Library (1963)
- Parliament as an Export (1966)

=== Journal article ===
- "Towards a Caribbean Federation" in Foreign Affairs Vol. 34, No. 1 (October 1955), pp. 128–140

== Honours ==
- Companion of the Order of St Michael and St George 1927 Birthday Honours
- Knight Commander of the Order of St Michael and St George 1936.
- Knight of the Order of St John of Jerusalem, of Rhodes and of Malta 1942
- Knight Grand Cross of the Order of St Michael and St George 1946

Government offices
| Preceded by Sir Harold Baxter Kittermaster | Governor of British Honduras; 1934–1939 | Succeeded by Sir John Adams Hunter |
| Preceded by George Ernest London | Governor of the Gold Coast; 1942–1947 | Succeeded by Sir Gerald Hallen Creasy |
