= West African Court of Appeal =

The West African Court of Appeal (WACA) was a court which served as the appellate court for the British colonies of Gold Coast, Nigeria, Gambia, and Sierra Leone.

== History ==
The WACA was first established in 1867 as the appellate court for British possessions in western Africa. It was abolished in 1874, but was revived in 1928. Jurisdiction over Nigeria was ended in 1954. The court became defunct with the independence of the states which it served. The court was based in Sierra Leone.

Decisions of the court could be appealed with leave to the Judicial Committee of the Privy Council.

Sir James Henley Coussey was appointed President of the court in 1955.

== List of presidents ==
- 192x–193x: Sir George Campbell Deane
- 1936–1946: Sir Donald Kingdon
- 1948–1951: Sir Henry William Butler Blackall
- 1951–1955: Sir Stafford William Powell Foster-Sutton
- 1955–1958: Sir James Henley Coussey
- 1958: Sir Hector Horace Hearne (acting)

== See also ==
- East African Court of Appeal
