= Hugh Wooding =

Trinidad and Tobago lawyer, politician (1904–1974)

Sir Hugh Wooding TC CBE PC QC
- Born: Hugh Olliviere Beresford Wooding; 14 January 1904; Trinidad and Tobago
- Died: 26 July 1974 (aged 70)
- Education: Middle Temple
- Occupations: Lawyer; Politician
- Spouse: Anne Marie Coussey (m. 1928)
- Children: 2 Sons and 2 Daughters
- Relatives: James Coussey (brother-in-law)

Sir Hugh Olliviere Beresford Wooding TC CBE PC QC (14 January 1904 – 26 July 1974) was a lawyer and politician from Trinidad and Tobago.

== Legal career ==
Hugh Wooding was born in Trinidad and Tobago into a family that hailed from Barbados. In 1914, he was awarded an exhibition to attend Queen's Royal College, and won the island scholarship to study law at the Middle Temple in London, being admitted to the Bar in 1927. He returned to Trinidad in 1926 and was called to the Bar of Trinidad and Tobago on 5 July 1927. He worked all over the Caribbean as well as in Trinidad. He became known as "Tiger" from his tenacity in court and would represent poorer people for a minimal fee. In 1937, he was made a CBE.

In 1962, he was appointed the first Chief Justice of the newly independent Trinidad and Tobago, a post he held until 1968. He was made a Queen's Counsel (QC). He was invested with a knighthood in the 1963 New Year Honours and made a member of the Privy Council of the United Kingdom in 1966.

He chaired in 1968 a commission of inquiry into riots in Bermuda, concluding that the authors of the uprisings were coloured youth who felt discriminated against by predominantly white police and also felt economically disadvantaged. In 1970, he sat before a committee which examined the legal situation of the Freeport region in the Bahamas.

== Political career ==
From 1941, Hugh Wooding also engaged in politics, and in 1943 was elected mayor of Port of Spain. He was also an active Freemason and was involved in the promotion of the arts, as well as supporting, for example, the efforts of cyclists to establish an independent cycling federation.

In 1971, he worked in a commission for the reform of the constitution of Trinidad and Tobago and was installed as Chancellor of the University of the West Indies on 13 November 1971, serving in that position until his death.

Wooding is also considered a pioneer and co-founder of legal education in the West Indian region and the Hugh Wooding Law School in Saint Augustine, Trinidad and Tobago, is named in his honour. In 1969, he was awarded the Trinity Cross, then the highest medal of Trinidad and Tobago.

== Personal life ==
On 14 January 1928, Wooding married Anne Marie Coussey, a British-educated African from a well-to-do Gold Coast family. She had previously been romantically involved with American poet Langston Hughes in Paris, and they had continued a long correspondence until she married Wooding. Wooding and his wife had four children: Selby (1928–2020), Ambah Rose (1929–2017; who married Max Thomas), Anne (born 1933; who married Garnet Woodham) and Henley (born 1940; who married Ingrid Granderson).

Wooding died of a heart attack, aged 70.
