= Horace Hearne =

English barrister and judge

Mr Justice Hearne

Sir Hector Horace Hearne (23 February 1892 – 31 December 1962) was an English barrister and judge.

Hearne was born in 1892, the son of Samuel Hearne and Edith (née Butterfield). He joined the Colonial Service as an Assistant District Commissioner, in Uganda in 1916. He later became a Senior Magistrate.

== Career ==
He was a Justice on the West African Court of Appeal (1954–1955), Chief Justice of Kenya (1951–1954), Chief Justice of Jamaica (1945-1950/1951), puisne judge, Ceylon (1937–1944), puisne judge, Tanganyika Territory (1934-1936/1937) and a non-practising barrister. He was called to the Bar by Lincoln's Inn on 24 June 1925, never practising as a barrister, although he first appeared in the Law List in 1926.

After holding the appointments of first class magistrate, district magistrate, senior magistrate and acting puisne judge, Hearne was appointed as a puisne judge (High Court judge), Tanganyika Territory (East Africa) in 1933/1934, where he acted as Chief Justice in 1935 and 1936. In 1936–1937, he was appointed a puisne judge in Ceylon, and sat in the Supreme Court in Colombo. He stayed there for most of the Second World War.

As a puisne judge of the Supreme Court of Ceylon, the judgments of Mr Justice Hearne were subject to at least two appeals to the Privy Council in London. The reported cases appear in the English law reports. They are: Abdul Hameed Sitti Kadija v De Saram [1946] AC 208 and Vander Poorten v Settlement Officer [1946] AC 271. The former case concerned construction of a will; the latter concerned the Waste Lands Ordinance, No 1 of 1897, ss 18, 20. The second case is probably of historical interest only; the first may conceivably still be a relevant authority (i.e. part of English caselaw). In the first case, Hearne J (as he is cited in the law reports) was one of the majority in the Supreme Court which made the decision which was appealed to the Privy Council. A fellow High Court Judge dissented; and the Privy Council upheld the dissenter, thus finding that Hearne J and his colleagues were in error. The second appeal was also allowed, another finding that Hearne and his colleagues had erred. Mr Justice Hearne also heard the Nuwaraeliya Oct 16, 1943 by-election petition filed by James T. Rutnam against his then opponent M. Dingiri Banda. [Rutnam v M. Dingiri Banda, 1944, 45 New Law Reports] and ruled in favor of James T. Rutnam. As a result of this ruling, M.D. Banda (who subsequently became a Cabinet minister in the UNP regimes) was unseated. Mr Justice Hearnes's verdict was, on the election day 'I hold that there was gross intimidation, that it was widespread in the area where Mr. Rutnam had good reason to count upon heavy voting in his favour and that it may well have prevented a majority of electors from returning the candidate whom they preferred.' The results declared for the by-election showed, M.D. Banda polling 12,652 votes against James T. Rutnam's tally of 11,093 votes.

Hearne became Chief Justice and Keeper of the Records in Jamaica, British West Indies, and sat in the Supreme Court, Kingston between 1945 and 1950/1951.

Hearne was created a Knight in 1946, and was known thereafter as Sir Hector. Unlike a number of his fellow judges, he was never made King's (or Queen's) Counsel. He was an honorary judge in the Queen's Bench division.

In 1951, Hearne became Chief Justice in Kenya and sat in the Supreme Court, Nairobi.

Hearne was escorting the Princess Elizabeth to a dinner at the Tree Tops Safari Hotel in Kenya on the night her father, King George VI, died and she became Queen Elizabeth II. She returned immediately to the UK, escorted by Hearne.

He held the position of chief justice in Kenya until 1954 when he became an appeal justice of the West African Court of Appeal, a position he held between 1954 and 1955. He was Acting President of the West African Court of Appeal in 1958. His speciality was Roman Law. Horace's last entry in the Law List as a barrister was 1963.

== Personal life ==
He married Winifred Combridge (died 1959); they had two sons. He died on 31 December 1962 at the age of 70.
