= 1948 Accra riots =

1948 riots in Accra, colonial Ghana

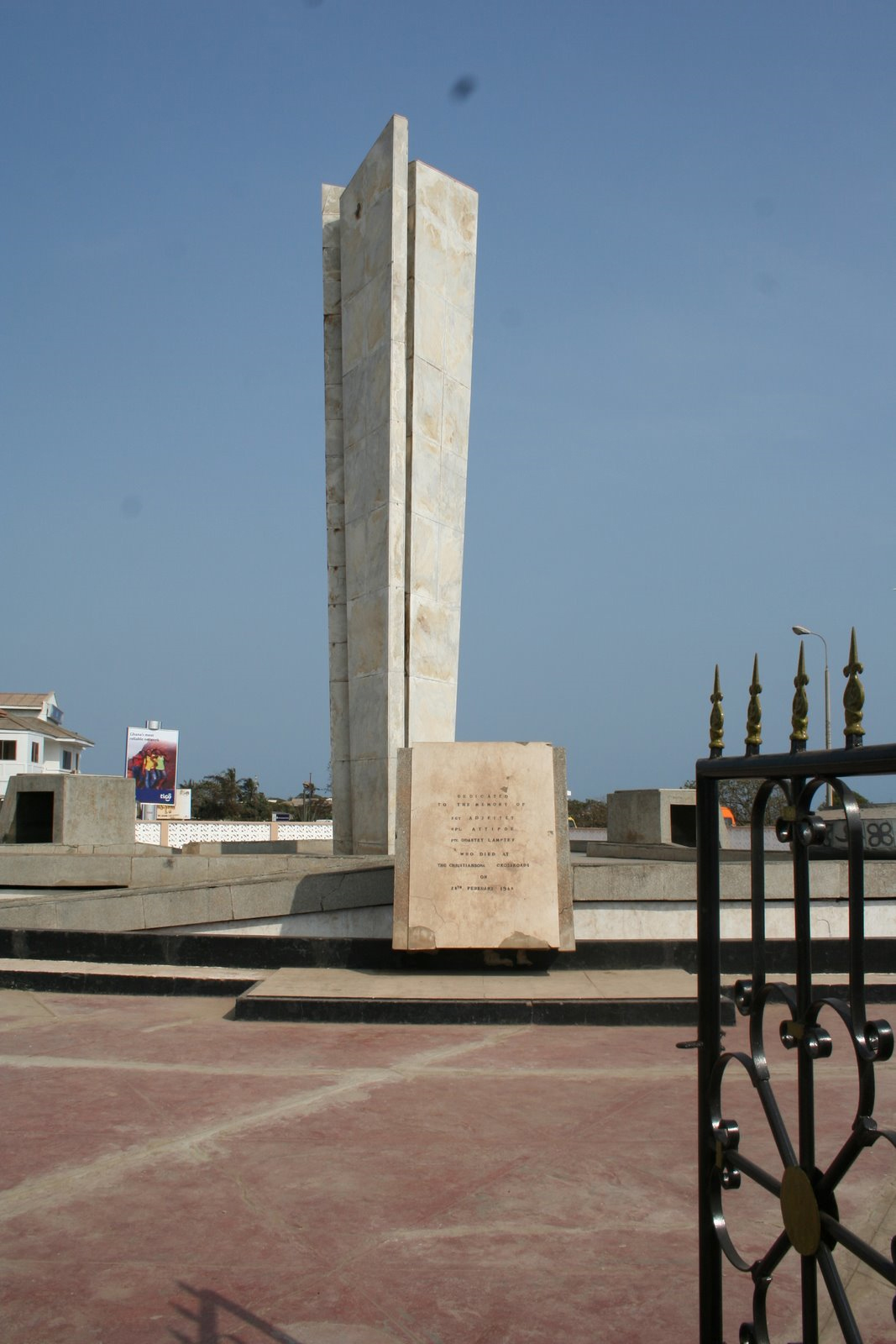
Monument to soldiers killed during the 1948 Accra riots

The Accra riots started on 28 February 1948 in Accra, the capital of the then British colony of the Gold Coast (present-day Ghana). Police broke up a protest march by unarmed ex-servicemen who were agitating for their benefits as veterans of World War II, having fought with the Gold Coast Regiment of the Royal West African Frontier Force. Three of the protest leaders of the group were left dead - Sergeant Nii Adjetey, Corporal Patrick Attipoe and Private Odartey Lamptey; all three have since been memorialized in Accra.

The 28 February incident is considered "the straw that broke the camel's back", marking the key point in the process of the Gold Coast becoming the first African colony to achieve independence, becoming Ghana on 6 March 1957.

== Background ==
In January 1948, the Ga chief, Nii Kwabena Bonne III, known in private life as Theodore Taylor (1888–1968), had organised a boycott of all European imports in response to their inflated prices. The boycott's aim was to press the foreign traders known as the Association of West African Merchants (AWAM) to reduce the inflated prices of their goods. (Note: AWAM has since become a term synonymous with cheating or profiteering in Ghana.) The boycott was followed by a series of riots in early February 1948. The day the boycott was scheduled to end, 28 February, coincided with a march in Accra by veterans of World War II.

== 28 February march and riot ==
The march on 28 February 1948 was a peaceful attempt by former soldiers to bring a petition to the Governor of the Gold Coast requesting the dispensation of promised pensions and other compensation for their efforts during the war. The ex-servicemen were members of the Gold Coast Regiment, who were among the most decorated African soldiers, having fought in Burma alongside British troops. Despite having been promised pensions and jobs after the war, when these servicemen returned home, there was scant employment for them and their pensions were not paid.

As the group marched towards the Governor's residence at Christiansborg Castle, they were stopped and confronted by the colonial police, who refused to let them pass. The British police superintendent Colin Imray ordered his subordinates to shoot at the protesters, but they did not. Possibly in panic, Imray grabbed a rifle and shot at the leaders of the protest, killing three veterans: Sergeant Adjetey, Corporal Attipoe and Private Odartey Lamptey. In addition to these three fatalities, several members of the crowd were wounded.

People in Accra took to the streets in riot over these killings. On the same day, the local political leadership, the United Gold Coast Convention (UGCC), led by the Big Six, sent a cable to the Secretary of State in London:

"...unless Colonial Government is changed and a new Government of the people and their Chiefs installed at the centre immediately, the conduct of masses now completely out of control with strikes threatened in Police quarters, and rank and file Police indifferent to orders of Officers, will continue and result in worse violent and irresponsible acts by uncontrolled people."

They also blamed the Governor Sir Gerald Creasy (whom they called "Crazy Creasy") for his handling of the country's problems. The UGCC cable further stated:

"Working Committee United Gold Coast Convention declare they are prepared and ready to take over interim Government. We ask in name of oppressed, inarticulate, misruled and misgoverned people and their Chiefs that Special Commissioner be sent out immediately to hand over Government to interim Government of Chief and People and to witness immediate calling of Constituent Assembly."

The unrest in Accra, and in other towns and cities, lasted for five days, during which Asian- and European-owned stores and businesses were looted and more deaths occurred. By 1 March, the Governor had declared a state of emergency and a new Riot Act was put in place. It was reported in the British parliament that the Governor had "imposed a curfew in certain parts of Accra and ... made regulations to control traffic and close roads". Strict press censorship was imposed over the entire country by Governor Creasy.

== Aftermath ==
The British colonial government set up the Watson Commission, which examined the circumstances of the riots, and paved the way for constitutional changes that culminated in Ghana's independence.

The immediate aftermath of the riots included the arrest on 12 March 1948 of "the Big Six" – Kwame Nkrumah and other leading activists in the United Gold Coast Convention (UGCC) party (namely Ebenezer Ako-Adjei, Edward Akufo-Addo, J. B. Danquah, Emmanuel Obetsebi-Lamptey and William Ofori Atta), who were held responsible for orchestrating the disturbances and were detained; they were released a month later. The arrest of the leaders of the UGCC raised the profile of the party around the country and made them national heroes.

The Watson Commission reported that the 1946 constitution was inappropriate from the start, because it did not address the concerns of the natives of the Gold Coast. The Commission also recommended that the Gold Coast be allowed to draft its own constitution. A 40-member committee was set up to draft a constitution, with six representatives of the UGCC. The governor excluded Kwame Nkrumah, among others, from the constitutional drafting committee, for fear of drafting a constitution that would demand absolute independence for the colony.

By 1949, Nkrumah had broken away from the UGCC to form the Convention People's Party (CPP), with the motto "Self-government now", and a campaign of "Positive Action". Nkrumah broke away, due to misunderstandings at the leadership front of the UGCC.

On 6 March 1957, the country achieved its independence and was renamed Ghana, with Kwame Nkrumah as its first President.
