= Odartey Lamptey =

Ghanaian soldier and activist (died 1948)

Private Odartey Lamptey (died 28 February 1948) was a Ghanaian soldier and activist. He was one of the three veterans shot dead by Superintendent Colin Imray while on their way to present a petition to Sir Gerald Creasy who was Governor of Gold Coast at the time. The death of these three ex-servicemen led to the 1948 Accra Riots and subsequently the arrest of "the Big Six".

== See also ==
- Sergeant Nii Adjetey
- Corporal Patrick Attipoe
