= James Coussey =

Judge in the Gold Coast

Sir James Coussey QC
- Born: James Henley Coussey; 1891; Gold Coast (now Ghana)
- Died: 6 June 1958 (aged 67); Accra, Dominion of Ghana
- Education: Hampton School; Middle Temple
- Occupations: Jurist, puisne judge
- Known for: Coussey Committee
- Spouse: Irene Dorothy Biney
- Children: 6

Sir James Henley Coussey QC (1891 – 6 June 1958) was a jurist in Gold Coast (British colony). He was a Puisne Judge of the Supreme Court of the Gold Coast, 1944–52, and President of the West African Court of Appeal, 1955–58. He was conferred with a knighthood by King George VI in the 1950 Birthday Honours.

Following the Accra riots of 1948, Coussey was commissioned by the United Kingdom to devise a Constitution for the Gold Coast, chairing the Committee on Constitutional Reform. Known as the Coussey Report, the work of the Committee informed the 1951 Constitution, paving the way for the Gold Coast's ultimate independence in 1957.

== Early life ==
He was the son of Charles Louis Romaine Pierre Coussey (1857–1940), a lawyer and merchant of the United Africa Company (UAC), and Ambah Orbah. Before serving with the United Africa Company (UAC), known then as Messrs. F. & A. Swanzy, Charles Coussey was the officer for the Borneo Company at Axim.

His sister, Anne Marie Coussey, was involved with Langston Hughes, having met him in Paris in 1924. John Alcindor, a friend of Anne's father, was sent to Paris to put an end to their acquaintance. She later married Sir Hugh Wooding, a jurist from Trinidad and Tobago.

== Education ==
Coussey was educated at Hampton School, England. He was called to the bar at Middle Temple on 16 April 1913, on the same evening as Sir Stafford Cripps.

== Family ==
Coussey married Irene Dorothy Biney (1905–2003), the daughter of Joseph Edward Biney, a barrister from Cape Coast, Gold Coast, who held shares in the Ashanti Goldfields, and Jessica Russell, in 1930 in Accra, and had issue:

He had Muriel Selby Coussey (4 May 1927) and Charles Coussey with his first wife, the late Gladys Agyeampong.

Together with Irene, he had:

1. James Romaine Henley Coussey OBE, KC, educated at Monkton Combe School, a Senior Prosecutor for the Crown Prosecution Service.
2. Russell Biney Henley Coussey, educated at King's College, Taunton
3. Christine Coussey, and
4. Marie Coussey.

The Cousseys lived for the most part at "The Arches", Accra, before their return to England.

== Funeral ==
Coussey died on Friday, 6 June 1958, in Accra, Dominion of Ghana, aged 67 years. He had retired from his work in January 1958.

A memorial service took place at St. Martin-in-the-Fields, presided over by the Bishop of Accra, The Rt Rev. Richard Roseveare. The Assistant Bishop of Accra, the Reverend E. D. Martinson, gave an address, and the Reverend Austen Williams, the Vicar of St. Martin-in-the-Fields, and Mr S. N. Grant-Bailey read the lesson.

Major-General Sir Ralph Hone represented the Secretary of State for Commonwealth Relations, and Sir Kenneth Roberts-Wray represented the Secretary of State for the Colonies. The High Commissioner of Ghana to the United Kingdom, Sir Ian Maclennan, and the Governor-General of Nigeria, Sir James Robertson, were also in attendance. The International Law Association, the General Council of the Bar, the Royal Commonwealth Society, and the Royal African Society were represented.
