= Watson Commission =

1948 inquiry into Gold Coast civil unrest

The Watson Commission was a commission of enquiry appointed by Sir Gerald Hallen Creasy, governor of the Gold Coast (1948–1949) to investigate the disturbances that occurred in the Gold Coast in February and March 1948. The commission was chaired by Aiken Watson, and published its report in June 1948.

== Background ==
On 28 February 1948, the shooting of protesting ex-service men led to looting and rioting in Accra and other major towns in the Gold Coast. The leadership of the United Gold Coast Convention (UGCC) sent a message to the Secretary of State of the Colonies Arthur Creech Jones in London, blaming Governor Creasey as the cause of the disturbance. These leaders were arrested and detained; they become known as the Big Six. The disturbance lasted for five days and the colonial government commissioned the Watson Commission to probe the cause of the disturbance.

The reference of the commission was: "To enquire into and report on the recent disturbances in the Gold Coast and their underlying causes; and to make recommendations on any matter arising from the enquiry." The commission was made up of Aiken Watson (chairman), Andrew Dalgleish and Keith A. H. Murray.

== Findings and recommendation ==
The commission submitted its report on 26 April 1948 to the Governor of the Gold Coast and Secretary of State of the Colonies. It found that the shooting of the ex-serviceman and the detaining of the Big Six was the immediate cause of the disturbance.
