= Nii Kwabena Bonnie III =

Ghanaian traditional ruler

Osu Alata Maŋtsɛ Oyokohene of Techiman
- Born: Kwamla Theodore Williamson Taylor; 1888
- Died: 1968 (aged 79–80)

Nii Kwabena Bonnie III (1888 – 1968), also known as Kwamla Theodore Taylor, was a Ghanaian (Ga) traditional ruler in Gold Coast, a British colony in West Africa, in 1947. He was a chief of Osu Alata Mantse and Oyokohene of Techiman.

== Life and career ==
In 1947, he formed an Anti-Inflation Campaign in Accra in response to the inflated prices by the European imported goods to Ghana. He directed his letter to the United Africa Company. In waiting for the response he toured the country to explain the plan for a boycott throughout the cities. The chiefs who supported or pledged to join the boycott were in Sekondi, Manya Krobo, Cape Coast, Suhum, Akim Oda, Tarkwa, and Axim.

He became the first Gold Coaster to earn an invitation from the British Royal Couple to tour Buckingham Palace in February 1925.He also hosted Sir Osei Agyemang Prempeh II, the Asantehene, and 500 entourage at the Royal Castle and its precincts in Accra for the inauguration of the 1946 Constitution, an invitation from the Colonial Governor.

== The boycott ==
Gold Coast was a British colony in West Africa in 1947. On 26 January 1948 the boycott began as planned. The slogan for the boycott was: "We cannot buy; your prices are too high. If you don’t cut down your prices then close down your stores; and take away your goods to your own country."

== Agreement ==
An agreement was reached as foreign firms reduced their overall profit from 75 to 50 percent on 20 February 1948. The result of the negotiations prompted the government to announce on radio to end the boycott on 28 February. The negotiating was between Anti-Inflation Campaign Committee and Chamber of Commerce.

The boycotters were disappointed when prices were not reduced as they anticipated;taking the 75 to 50 percent as a price reduction but rather overall profit margins. This in reality resulted in negligible change of cost of living. Ex-servicemen on the last day of the boycott marched from Accra to the British governor, but were stopped by the police to present the petition to the governor. This led to a riot, positioning Kwame Nkrumah to demonstrate for Independence as the United Gold Coast Convention (UGCC) leader.

An outcome of the boycott was dismissal of some students from government schools who participated in the boycott. The UGCC executive/steering committee initiated the establishment of alternative high school for the students dismissed as supporters of Nii Kwabena Bonnie of European merchants and traders. The results led to the founding of Ghana National College, which was later adopted by Kwame Nkrumah.
