= Cornelius Francis Adjetey =

Ghanaian ex-serviceman (died 1948)

Sergeant Adjetey
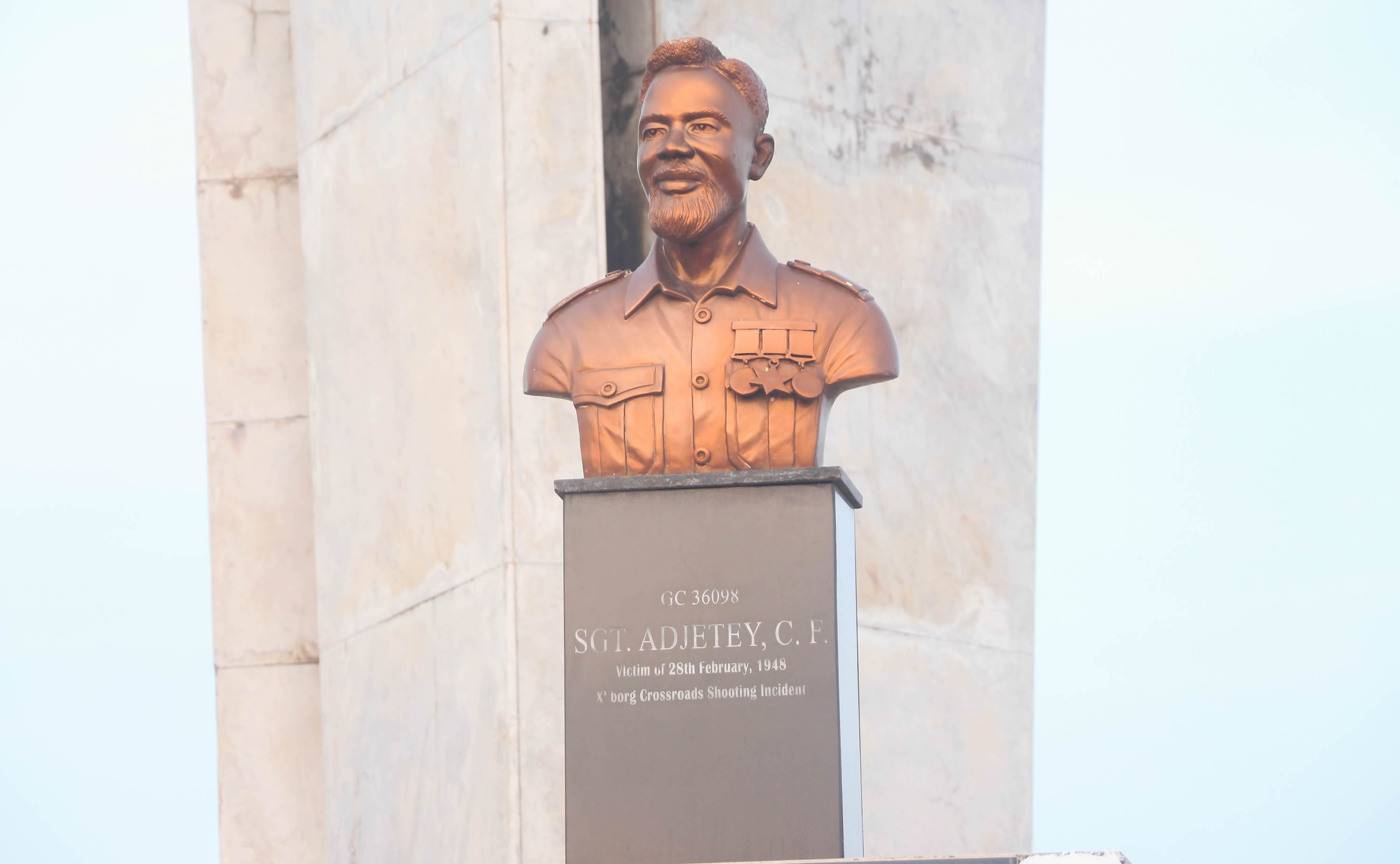
- A bust of Sergeant Adjetey
- Born: Cornelius Francis Adjetey
- Died: 28 February 1948
- Military career
- Rank: Sergeant

Sergeant Cornelius Francis Adjetey (died 28 February 1948) was a Ghanaian ex-serviceman and veteran of World War II. He was one of the three veterans – the others being Corporal Patrick Attipoe and Private Odartey Lamptey – shot dead by Major Imray while on their way to present a petition to Sir Gerald Creasy, who was Governor of Gold Coast at the time. The death of these three ex-servicemen led to the 1948 Accra riots.

== Biography ==
Cornelius Francis Adjetey fought for the British Empire during World War II as a citizen of the Gold Coast Colony. He died on 28 February 1948 when he, along with two other veterans, were killed. The three veterans were shot dead by Major Imray while they were on their way to present a petition to the Governor of the Gold Coast, Gerald Creasy.

Prior to their deaths, according to a tribute written to Adjetey, there was a boycott on "whiteman goods", the reason behind the boycott being to register dissent about the manner in which the white man treated an African. On 28 February 1948, a negotiated price reduction of the inflated goods was to come into effect and the boycott was to be called off. A deputation of unarmed ex-servicemen, led by sergeant Adjetey and others were fired upon and attacked by police on their way to present the petition to the Governor at Osu Castle. Adjetey and the two other veterans, Corporal Patrick Attipoe and Private Odartey Lamptey, all fought in the Second World War with the allied forces. A tribute states that certain promises were made to the veterans because of their service. Such promises included better treatment and for their voices to be heard. However, these veterans and other ex-servicemen were protesting and bringing the petition to Osu Castle because those promises had not been kept.

The news of the murder of the three veterans spread widely and quickly and added fuel to the turmoil that was already going on about the government, regarding the alleged corruption. The people took to looting and burning the shops of European companies, which actions were known as the "Accra riots". Those who masterminded the boycott were the Joint Provincial Council Chiefs, a council created to strengthen the position of the traditional chiefs during colonial times. Law and order broke down in Accra and other parts of the country, these events were also known as "the 1948 disturbances". The boycott was very successful and was observed throughout the country.

These events encouraged the anti-colonial movements to pressure the British government to institute a committee to investigate the killings and all the wrongdoings. The committee recommended self-government for the Gold Coast, which eventually led to the country gaining its independence on 6 March 1957. The deaths of Cornelius Francis Adjetey and the other two veterans sparked a great deal of conflict within the government, which some viewed as necessary. It is claimed these conflicts were necessary because they caused change in the government. Their importance is documented because of the change that their lives caused. Till this day Ghanaians mark the anniversary of the 28 February 1948 crossroads shooting incident in remembrance of the three gallant, defenceless ex-servicemen who were murdered in cold blood while protesting peacefully.
