= Emmanuel Obetsebi-Lamptey =

Ghanaian politician (1902 – 1963)

- Born: Emmanuel Odarkwei Obetsebi-Lamptey; 26 April 1902; Ode, Accra, Gold Coast
- Died: 29 January 1963 (aged 60); Accra, Ghana
- Occupations: Politician; Lawyer
- Known for: The Big Six
- Spouses: Margaretha Obetsebi-Lamptey; Augustina Akuorkor Cofie
- Children: Jake Otanka Obetsebi-Lamptey
- Relatives: Gottlieb Ababio Adom (step-brother)

Emmanuel Odarkwei Obetsebi-Lamptey (affectionately known as Liberty Lamptey, 26 April 1902 – 29 January 1963) was a political activist in the British colony of the Gold Coast. He was one of the founding fathers of the United Gold Coast Convention (UGCC) known as "The Big Six". He was the father of NPP politician Jake Obetsebi-Lamptey. He played a vital role in the Big Six. He was recognized for his leadership. He was bold, confident and inspired his people to have hope. His leadership role being played well brought a change to the political, economical and social standards required to pronounce Ghana as an independent country from its colonial masters. Many argue that together with the rest of the big six with the exception of Dr. Nkrumah didn't contribute enough to the independence of Ghana to merit the recognition given them in present day Ghana.

== Early life ==
He was born on 26 April 1902 at a Ga village near Ode, a suburb of Accra. His father was Jacob Mills Lamptey, a businessman, and his mother was Victoria Ayeley Tetteh. His step-brother was Gottlieb Ababio Adom (1904–1979), an educator, journalist, editor and Presbyterian minister who served as the Editor of the Christian Messenger, the newspaper of the Presbyterian Church of Ghana, from 1966 to 1970.

== Education ==
He attended the Accra Wesleyan School and further went to the Royal School. He graduated LL.B., and was called to the Bar at the Inner Temple in 1939. By then, World War II (1939–45) had begun, to which he stayed and worked in England.

== Personal life ==
Emmanuel Obetsebi-Lamptey initially married a Dutch woman, Margaretha, with whom he had two sons: Jake Obetsebi-Lamptey (a New Patriotic Party politician, television and radio producer and advertising businessman) and Nee Lamkwei Afadi Obetsebi-Lamptey.

Obestebi-Lamptey later married a Ga woman, Augustina Akuorko Cofie (17 December 1923 – 14 November 2019), younger twin daughter of William Charles Cofie and Irene Odarchoe. She was a co-founder of the Gold Coast Women's Association and a former tutor at the Accra Methodist Girls School from 1947 to 1953. In 1970, she became the first Ghanaian woman to be appointed envoy to Liberia. In the Greater Accra Region, she was involved in philanthropy in the women's prisons. Obetsebi-Lamptey had two children with Cofie, Nah-Ayele and Nii Lante.

=== Death ===
Obetsebi-Lamptey died after suffering from cancer.

== Legacy ==
His well-established legacy is reflected in Ghanaian History books, street names, and the Obetsebi-Lamptey Interchange on the Ring Road West in Accra, Ghana. A monument has been mounted in his memory after completion of the interchange.

== See also ==
- The Big Six
- United Gold Coast Convention
- Jacob Otanka Obetsebi-Lamptey
