= Gerald Creasy =

British colonial governor (1897–1983)

Sir Gerald Creasy OBE GCMG
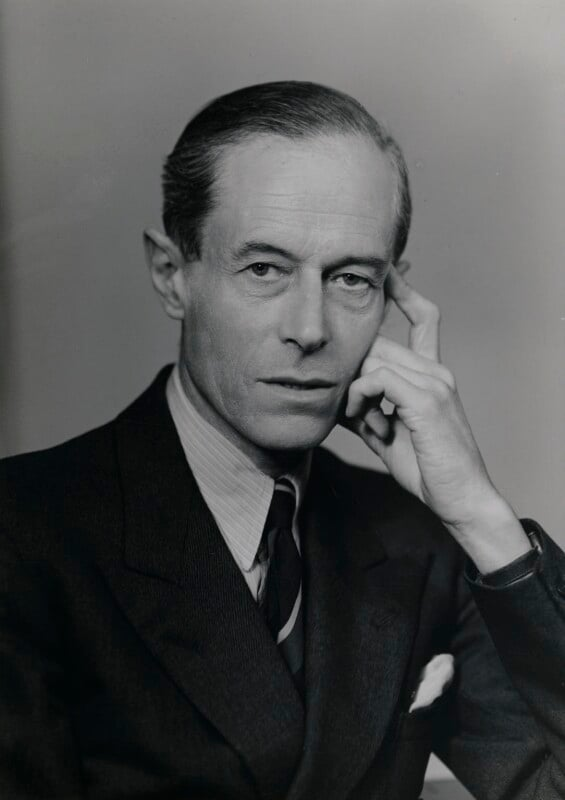
- Gerald Creasy in 1949

Governor of Malta
- In office 16 September 1949 – 3 August 1954
- Monarchs: George VI; Elizabeth II
- Preceded by: Sir Francis Douglas
- Succeeded by: Major-General Sir Robert Laycock

Governor of the Gold Coast
- In office 12 January 1948 – 15 February 1949
- Monarch: George VI
- Preceded by: Sir Alan Cuthbert Maxwell Burns
- Succeeded by: Sir Robert Scott

Personal details
- Born: Gerald Hallen Creasy; 1 November 1897 Windsor, Berkshire
- Died: 9 June 1983 (aged 85) Eastbourne, Sussex
- Spouse: Helen Duff Jacomb (m. 1925)
- Children: 4 (2 sons, 2 daughters)

Sir Gerald Hallen Creasy GCMG OBE (1 November 1897 – 9 June 1983) was a British colonial administrator. He served as governor of the Gold Coast and of Malta.

The "Christiansborg cross-roads shooting incident" that led to the 1948 Accra Riots occurred while Creasy was governor in the Gold Coast.

== Personal life ==
Gerald Hallen Creasy was born on 1 November 1897 in Windsor, Berkshire in the United Kingdom of Great Britain and Ireland, the second youngest of 5. His father, Leonard Creasy, was 42 at the time of his birth, and his mother Ellen Maud Elvey, was 37. In 1925 he married Helen Duff Jacomb and the pair lived in Haywards Heath, Sussex with their 4 children, Anthony, John, Juliet, and Joanna. He died and was buried in Eastbourne, Sussex at the age of 85 on 9 June 1983. Lady Creasy would outlive him by 17 years, dying in 2000.

Two of his brothers were Admiral of the Fleet Sir George Elvey Creasy and Major Robert Leonard Creasy, who died in the Battle of Courtrai.

== Gold Coast ==
Creasy was appointed governor on 12 January 1948. He succeeded Sir Alan Burns. He is however most remembered in Ghana for the "Christiansborg cross-roads shooting incident" on 28 February 1948, about six weeks into his job. Three unarmed former World War II veterans were killed and 60 wounded that day while demonstrating about end of service benefits. The protests had followed the Association of West African Merchants (AWAM) boycotts in Accra. This played into the hands of the local political leadership, the United Gold Coast Convention (UGCC).

Led by the Big Six, they sent a cable on the same day to the Secretary of State in London:

unless Colonial Government is changed and a new Government of the people and their Chiefs installed at the centre immediately, the conduct of masses now completely out of control with strikes threatened in Police quarters, and rank and file Police indifferent to orders of Officers, will continue and result in worse violent and irresponsible acts by uncontrolled people.

They also blamed "Crazy Creasy" for all the unrests. The Riot Act was read the next day, 1 March 1948 and the Big Six were arrested and detained. The Watson commission of enquiry chaired by Aiken Watson was set up to look into the riots. He was replaced in an acting capacity by Sir Robert Scott as governor of the Gold Coast on 15 February 1949.

== Malta ==
Creasy succeeded Sir Francis Campbell Ross Douglas as Governor of Malta on 16 September 1949. He was succeeded by Sir Robert Laycock on 3 August 1954.

== See also ==
- The Big Six (Ghana)

Government offices
Preceded by Sir Alan Cuthbert Maxwell Burns	Governor of the Gold Coast; 1948–1949	Succeeded by Sir Robert Scott
Preceded by Sir Francis Campbell Ross Douglas	Governor of Malta; 1949–1954	Succeeded by Sir Robert Edward Laycock
