= Patrick Attipoe =

Ghanaian ex-serviceman (died 1948)

Corporal Patrick Attipoe (died 28 February 1948) was a Ghanaian ex-serviceman and veteran of World War II. He was one of the three veterans shot dead by Major Imray while on their way to present a petition to Sir Gerald Creasy who was Governor of Gold Coast at the time. The death of these three ex-servicemen led to the 1948 Accra Riots.

A bronze statue in commemoration of Attipoe was unveiled in 2018 in his hometown, Kpota, Anyako, in the Volta Region of Ghana.
