= List of abbreviations in Ghana =

This is a list of abbreviations commonly used in Ghana and previously in the Gold Coast

== A ==
AATUF	All-African Trade Union Federation
ABU	African Boxing Union
ACDC	Army Central Defence Committee
ACDR	Association of Committees for the Defence of the Revolution
ACI	African Culture Institute
ACID	Amansuri Conservation and Integrated Development
ACP	African, Caribbean and Pacific Group of States
ACP	Action Congress Party
ACP	Assistant Commissioner of Police
ADB	African Development Bank
ADC	Agricultural Development Corporation
ADF	Alliance of Democratic Forces
ADDRO	Anglican Diocesan Development and Relief Organization
AEFG	Aid Effectiveness Forum - Ghana
AFC	Alliance for Change
AFCAS	African Commission on Agricultural Statistics
AFDC	Armed Forces Defence Commission
AFF	African Freedom Fighters
AFRC	Armed Forces Revolutionary Council
AFWC	African Forestry and Wildlife Commission
AGC	Ashanti (Asante) Goldfields Corporation
AGCC	African Gold Coast Company
AGI	Association of Ghana Industries
ALPE	Alliance for Poverty Eradication
AMA	Accra Metropolitan Assembly
AME	African Methodist Episcopal Zion Church
ANUC	All Nations University College
AOMC	Association of Oil Marketing Companies
APP	All People's Party
APP	Africa Progress Panel
APRP	All People's Republican Party
APTI	Association of Principals of Technical Institutions
ARI	Animal Research Institute
ARPB	Association of Recognized Professional Bodies
ARPS	Aborigines' Rights Protection Society
ASP	Assistant Superintendent of Police
AU	African Union
AUC	Ashesi University College
AWAM	Association of West African Merchants
AYA	Anlo Youth Association
AYA	Anlo Youth Association
AYB	African Youth Brigade
AYC	Africa Youth Command

== B ==
BA	Bachelor for Administration
BAG	Bar Association of Ghana
BARADEP	Brong-Ahafo Regional Agricultural Development Program
BARDEC	Brong-Ahafo Regional Development Corporation
BECE	Basic Education Certificate Examination
BG	Border Guards
BHC	Bank for Housing Construction
B.L.	Bachelor of Law Sciences
BNI	Bureau of National Investigations
BoG	Bank of Ghana
BSL	Black Star Line
BSPS	Business Sector Programme Support

== C ==
C & S	Cherubim and Seraphim Society
CA	Constitutional Assembly
CA	Consultative Assembly
CAP	National Coalition Against the Privatization of Water
CAS	Chief of the Air Staff
CBA	Collective Bargaining Agreement
CCAF	Coca Cola Africa Foundation
CCDEF	Coordinating Committee of Democratic Forces
CCDF	Coordinating Committee of Democratic Forces
CCE	Center for Civic Education
CCG	Christian Council of Ghana
CCLM	Community Based Child Labour Monitoring
CDD-Ghana	Center for Democratic Development, Ghana
CDR	Committee for the Defence of the Revolution
CDS	Chief of the Defence Staff
CECAF	Fishery Committee for the Eastern Central Atlantic
CEDEP	Center for the Development of People
CEPS	Customs, Excise and Preventive Service
CGMC	Chamber of Ghanaian Mining Concessionaires
CHPS	Community-Based Health Planning and Services
CHRAJ	Commission on Human Rights and Administrative Justice
CICOL	Civil Society Coalition on Land
CID	Criminal Investment Department
CILT	Chartered Institute of Logistics and Transport
CIP	Community Initiated Project
CLGSA	Civil and Local Government Staff Association
CMA	Christian Mothers Association
CMB	Cocoa Marketing Board
CME	Council of Muslim Elders
CMS	Church Missionary Society
CNC	Central National Committee (Ghana)
CNS	Chief of the Naval Staff
CO	Colonial Office
COAS	Chief of the Army Staff
COCOBOD	Ghana Cocoa Board
COPAL	Cocoa Producers' Alliance
COSG	Cross of the Order of the Star of Ghana
COV	Companion of the Order of the Volta
COYA	Committee on Youth Associations
CPA	Community Protection Assistants
CPA	Cocoa Producers Alliance
CPC	Cocoa Purchasing Company
CPP	Convention People's Party
CPU	Community Protection Units
CRIG	Cocoa Research Institute of Ghana
CSA	Civil Servants Association
CSIR	Council (Center) for Scientific and Industrial Research
CSU	Christian Service University College
CSU	Christ Symbolic Union
CTO	Commonwealth Telecommunication Organization
CTS	(West African) Command Clerks Training School
CUCG	Catholic University College of Ghana
CUT	Committee of Togolese Unity
CVC	Citizens' Vetting Committee
CWA	Catholic Women's Association
CYO	Catholic Youth Organization
CYO	Committee on Youth Organization

== D ==
DA	District Assembly
DAG	Democratic Alliance of Ghana
DAO	District Administrative Officer
DAPIT	Development and Application of Intermediate Technology Program
DC	District Commissioner
DCE	District Chief Executive
DEC	District Executive Committee
DFI	Department of Factories Inspectorate
DFID	Department for International Development
DFP	Democratic Freedom Party
DIC	Divestiture Implementation Committee
DMC	Diamond Marketing Corporation
DOC	Department of Cooperatives
DOVVSU	Domestic Violence and Victim Support Unit
DPP	Democratic People's Party
DS	District Secretary
DSW	Department of Social Welfare
DUA	Democrat Union of Africa
DVC	Diaspora Vote Committee
DVLA	Driver and Vehicle Licensing Authority
DWM	31st December Women's Movement
DWP	Decent Work Programme
DYLG	Democratic Youth League of Ghana

== E ==
EAC	Economic Advisory Committee
EC	Electoral Commission
ECOMOG	ECOWAS Monitoring Group
ECOWAS	Economic Community of West African States
ECRAG	Entertainment Critics and Reviewers Association of Ghana
EDP	Entrepreneurship Development Program
EEC	European Economic Community
EGLE	Every Ghanaian Living Everywhere
EITI	Extractive Industries Transparency Initiative
EREDEC	Eastern Regional Development Corporation
EPA	Economic Partnership Agreements
ERP	Economic Recovery Program
ETLS	ECOWAS Trade Liberalisation Scheme

== F ==
FAO	Food and Agriculture Organization
FC	Forestry Commission
FDB	Food and Drugs Board
FDC	Food Distribution Corporation
FEAC	Foreign Exchange Auction Committee
FGM	Female Genital Mutilation
FOD	Fraternal Order of Police
FOIB	Freedom of Information Bill
FORIG	Forestry Research Institute of Ghana
FOREX	Foreign Exchange Bureau
FPD	Front for the Prevention of Dictatorship
FPIB	Forest Production Inspection Bureau
FRI	Food Research Institute
FSD	Forest Service Division
FWSC	Fair Wages and Salaries Commission
FY	Federation of Youth
FYO	Federated Youth Organization

== G ==
GAAS	Ghana Academy of Arts and Sciences
GABA	Ghana Amateur Boxing Association
GADL	Ghana Association of Democratic Lawyers
GAF	Ghana Armed Forces
GAFCSC	Ghana Armed Forces Command & Staff College
GAS	Ghana Academy of Sciences
GAINS	Ghana Agricultural Information Network System
GAW	Ghana Association of Writers
GAWU	Ghana Agricultural Workers' Union
GAWW	Ghanaian Association for Women's Welfare
GBA	Ghana Bar Association
GBC	Ghana Bauxite Company
GBC	Ghana Broadcasting Corporation
GC	Gold Coast
GC	Grand Coalition
GCARPS	Gold Coast Aborigines Rights Protection Society
GCC	Gold Coast Constabulary
GCC	Ghana Co-operative College
GCC	Ghana Co-operative Council
GCD	Ghana Consolidated Diamonds Ltd.
GCEU	Gold Coast Ex-Servicemen's Union
GCFA	Gold Coast Farmers' Association
GCHC	Ghana Cargo Handling Company
GCMA	Ghana Co-operative Marketing Association
GCP	Ghana Congress Party
GCPP	Great Consolidated Popular Party
GCSA	Ghana Civil Servants Association
GCTUC	Gold Coast Trades Union Congress
GCUC	Garden City University College
GCUC	Ghana Christian University College
GDM	Ghana Democratic Movement
GDP	Gross Domestic Product
GDRP	Ghana Democratic Republican Party
GEC	Ghana Enterprises Commission
GEPC	Ghana Export Promotion Council
GES	Ghana Education Service
GET	Ghana Educational Trust
GFA	Ghana Football Authority or Ghana Football Association
GFDC	Ghana Food Distribution Corporation
GFIC	Ghana Film Industry Corporation
GHA	Ghana Highway Authority
GHAPSO	Ghana People's Solidarity Organization
GHS	Ghana Health Service
GIA	Ghana International Airlines
GIHOC	Ghana Industrial Holding Corporation
GILLBT	Ghana Institute of Linguistics, Literacy and Bible Translation
GIMPA	Ghana Institute of Management and Public Administration
GJA	Ghana Journalists Association
GJA	Ghana Judo Association
GLSS	Ghana Living Standards Survey
GMA	Ghana Manufacturing Association
GMA	Ghana Medical Association
GMA	Ghana Military Academy
GMFJ	Ghana Movement for Freedom and Justice
GMRC	Ghana Muslim Representative Council
GNA	Ghana National Archives
GNA	Ghana News Agency
GNAT	Ghana National Association of Teachers
GNCC	Ghana National Chamber of Commerce
GNCC	Ghana Nation Commission on Children
GNCC	Ghana National Construction Corporation
GNFC	Ghana National Farmers' Council
GNFS	Ghana National Fire Service
GNMC	Ghana National Manganese Corporation
GNPC	Ghana National Petroleum Corporation
GNTC	Ghana National Trading Corporation
GNYC	Ghana National Youth Council
GOIL	Ghana Oil Company
GOPDC	Ghana Oil Palm Development Corporation
GP	Ghana Post
GPHA	Ghana Ports and Harbours Authority
GPM	Ghana Patriotic Movement
GPP	Ghana Peoples' Party
GPPF	Ghana Progressive Popular Front
GPSC	Ghana Peace and Solidarity Council
GPTCWU	Ghana Petroleum, Transport and Chemical Workers Union
GPRTU	Ghana Private Road Transport Union
G-RAP	Ghana Research and Advocacy Programme
GRC	Ghana Railway Corporation
GREDA	Ghana Real Estate Developers Association
GSB	Ghana Standards Board
GSC	Ghana Shippers Council
GSD	Geological Survey Department
GSE	Ghana Stock Exchange
GSHRDC	Gender Studies and Human Rights Documentation Centre
GSL	Ghana School of Law
GSMC	Ghana State Mining Corporation
GSPD	Ghana Society of the Physical Disabled
GTB	Ghana Tourist Board
GTLC	Ghana Trade and Livelihood Coalition
GTMC	Ghana Timber Marketing Board
GTMO	Ghana Timber Miller Organization
GTP	Ghana Textile Printing
GTPCWU	General Transport, Petroleum and Chemical Workers' Union
GTUC	Ghana Telecom University College
GTV	Ghana Television
GUNSA	Ghana United Nations Students' Association
GUP	Ghana University Press
GWCL	Ghana Water Company Limited
GYP	Ghana Young Pioneer movement

== H ==
HRD	Human Resource Development
HIPC	Heavily Indebted Poor Country
HSWU	Health Services Workers' Union

== I ==
IAP	Implementation Action Plan
IAS	Institute of African Studies
IAS	Independent African States
IASB	International African Service Bureau
IBRD	International Bank for Reconstruction and Development
ICC	Industrial Co-operative Corporation
ICCES	Integrated Community Centres for Employable Skills
ICCO	International Cocoa Organization
ICO	International Coffee Organization
ICOUR	Irrigation Company for the Upper Regions
ICT	Information Communication Technology
ICU	Industrial and Commercial Workers' Union
ICVB	International Cocoa Verification Board
IDA	Irrigation Development Authority
IDC	Industrial Development Corporation
IDEA	International Institute for Democracy and Electoral Assistance
IGP	Inspector-General of the Police
IMC	Interim Management Committee
IMF	International Monetary Fund
IMWG	Inter-Ministerial Working Group
INCC	Interim National Coordinating Committee
INEC	Interim National Electoral Commission
INSTI	Institute for Scientific Technological Information
IOM	International Organization for Migration
IRI	Industrial Research Institute
ISD	Information Services Department
ISODEC	Integrated Social Development Centre
ISP	Institutional Strengthening Plan
ITOCA	Information Training and Outreach Centre for Africa
ITSA	Information Technology Students Association-(ask vvu - tc)
IUCG	Islamic University College, Ghana
IVRDP	Inland Valleys Rice Development Project

== J ==
JAMB	Joint Admissions and Matriculation Board
JCC	Joint Consultative Committee
JCSA	Junior Civil Servants Association
JFM	June Fourth Movement
JP	Justice Party
JPC	Joint Provincial Council of Chiefs
JSS	Junior Secondary School
JWAC	Joint West Africa Committee

== K ==
KAIPTC	Kofi Annan International Peacekeeping Training Centre
KMA	Kumasi Metropolitan Assembly
KMAC	King's Medal for African Chiefs
KNRG	Kwame Nkrumah Revolutionary Guards
KNUST	Kwame Nkrumah University of Science and Technology

== L ==
LA	Legislative Assembly
LAP	Land Administration Project
LD	Labour Department
LEAP	Livelihood Empowerment Against Poverty
LGWU	Local Government Workers Union
LI	Legislative Instrument (ask vvu-tc)
LMIS	Labour Market Information System
LOC	Local Organizing Committee of Ghana
LRP	Labor Re-deployment Program
LTPA	Local Textile Printers Association

== M ==
MAC	Military Advisory Council
MAP	Muslim Association Party
MATS	Military Academy and Training School
MAYAN	Militant African Youth Against Neo-Colonialism
MBE	Member of the Order of the British Empire
MDG	Millennium Development Goals
MDPI	Management Development and Productivity Institute
MESW	Ministry of Employment and Social Welfare
MFJ	Movement for Freedom and Justice
MI	Military Intelligence
M+J	Mabey & Johnson
MMR	Medium Mortar Regiment
MOC	Municipal Oversight Committee
MOFA	Ministry of Food and Agriculture
MOFEP	Ministry of Finance and Economic Planning
MOPAD	Movement for Peace and Democracy
MOTI	Ministry of Trade and Industry
MOV	Member of the Order of Volta
MP	Member of Parliament
MTN	Mobile Telecommunications Network
MUC	Maranatha University College
MUC	Meridian University College
MUCG	Methodist University College Ghana
MYC	Muslim Youth Congress

== N ==
NA	Native Authority
NACOB	Narcotics Control Bureau (Board)
NADECO	National Development Company
NADMO	National Disaster Management Organization
NAFAC	National Festival of Arts and Culture
NAFTI	National Film and Television Institute
NAG	National Archives of Ghana
NAGRAT	National Association of Graduate Teachers
NAL	National Alliance of Liberals
NALCO	National Association of Local Councils
NAO	Native Administration Ordinance
NAPATS	National Police Academy & Training Schools
NARAC	National Agricultural Resources Allocation Committee
NASPA	National Service Personnel Association
NASSO	National Association of Socialist Students Organizations
NBSSI	National Board for Small-Scale Industries
NBTPE	National Board of Technical and Professional Examinations
NCBWA	National Congress of British West Africa
NCC	National Commission on Culture
NCCE	National Commission for Civic Education
NCD	National Commission on Democracy
NCGW	National Council of Ghana Women
NCP	National Convention Party
NCWD	National Council for Women and Development
NDC	National Defence Committee
NDC	National Democratic Congress
NDF	National Democratic Front
NDM	National Democratic Movement
NDM	New Democratic Movement
NDP	National Democratic Party
NDPC	National Development Planning Commission
NEB	National Energy Board
NEC	National Economic Commission
NEPAD	New Economic Partnership for Africa's Development
NES	National Employment Service
NGA	New Generation Alliance
NGP	New Ghana Party
NHC	National House of Chiefs
NHC	National Haji Committee
NHIS	National Health Insurance Scheme
NIB	National Investment Bank
NIC	National Investigating Committee
NIP	New Independence Party / National Independence Party
NLC	National Labour Commission
NLC	National Liberation Council
NLCD	National Liberation Council Decree
NLM	National Liberation Movement
NRC	National Redemption Council
NNP	Nkrumah National Party
NP	Nationalist Party
NPA	National Plan of Action
NPECLC	National Programme for the Elimination of Worst Forms of Child Labour in Cocoa
NPP	New Patriotic Party
NPP	Northern People's Party
NPTB	National Petroleum Tender Board
NRC	National Reconciliation Commission
NRC	National Redemption Council
NRCD	National Redemption Council Decree
NREG	Natural Resource and Environmental Governance
NRSC	National Road Safety Commission
NRP	National Reform Party
NSC	National Security Council
NSC	National Service Corps
NSPS	National Social Protection Strategy
NSS	National Service Scheme
NT	Northern Territories
NTC	Northern Territories Council
NTTC	National Teacher Training Council
NUGS	National Union of Ghana Students
NUS	National Union of Seamen
NVTI	National Vocational and Technical Institute
NYA	Northern Youth Association
NYC	National Youth Council
NYEP	National Youth Employment Program

== O ==
OAC	Organization for African Community
OATUU	Organization of African Trade Union Unity
OAU	Organization of African Unity
OCDR	Organizing Committee for the Defence of the Revolution
OFY	Operation Feed Yourself
OIC (OICG, OIC-Ghana)	Opportunities Industrialization Centre - Ghana
OOV	Officer of the Order of Volta
OPRI	Oil Palm Research Institute
ORC	Office of Revenue Commissioners
OTDC	Overseas Trade Development Council
OVC	orphans, vulnerable children

== P ==
PAC	Pan African Club
PAC	Political Advisory Committee
PACU(C)	Pan-African Christian University College
PAMSCAD	Program of Action to Mitigate the Social Cost of Adjustment
PANAFEST	Pan African Festival
PAP	People's Action Party (1969–1970 or 2018–2022)
PBC	Pentecost Bible Centre
PBD	Produce Buying Division (of Cocoa Marketing Board)
PCP	People's Convention Party
PDA	Preventive Detention Act
PDC	People's Defence Committee
PDD	Presidential Detail Department
PEA	People's Educational Association
PEAs	Private employment agencies
PEF	Private Enterprise Foundation
PFP	Popular Front Party
PHP	People's Heritage Party
PIB	Price and Incomes Board
PIP	People's Independent Party
PLWHA	Peoples Living With HIV/AIDS
PMFJ	People's Movement for Freedom and Justice
PMMC	Precious Minerals Marketing Corporation
PNC	People's National Convention
PNDC	Provisional National Defence Council
PNDCL	Provisional National Defence Council Law
PNP	People's National Party
POGR	President's Own Guard Regiment
POYA	Popular Youth Association
PP	Progress Party
PPAG	Planned Parenthood Association of Ghana
PPB	Public Procurement Board
PPC	Petroleum Promotion Council
PPDD	Popular Party for Democracy and Development
PPF	People's Popular Front
PPP	People's Popular Party
PRELOG	People's Revolutionary League of Ghana
PRLG	People's Revolutionary League of Ghana
PRP	People's Revolutionary Party
PSC	Police Service Commission
PSG	Pharmaceutical Society of Ghana
PSI	Presidential's Special Initiatives
PSWU	Public Services Workers' Union
PTWU	Post and Telecommunications Workers' Union
PTA	Parent-Teacher Association
PUC	Pentecost University College
PUC	Presbyterian University College
PURC	Public Utilities Regulatory Commission
PWDs	People with disabilities
PYG	Patriotic Youth of Ghana

== Q ==
QUT=Quantity union Transfer

== R ==
RAC	Royal African Company
RACCLI	Royal African Colonial Corps of Light Infantry
RAF	Regional Office for Africa
RAO	Research and Advocacy Organizations
RC	Regional Commissioner
RDC	Regional Development Corporation
ROCAS	Royal Care and Support
ROPAL	Representation of the People's Amendment Law
RTU	Real Tamale United
RWAFF	Royal West African Frontier Force

Re=Rain earn

== S ==
SAEMA	Shama Ahanta East Metropolitan Assembly
SAG	Senior Advocate of Ghana
SAL	Structural Adjustment Loan
SAP	Structural Adjustment Program
SCMB	State Cocoa Marketing Board
SCOA	Société Commerciale de l'Ouest Africain
SDF	Social Democratic Front
SEC	State Enterprises Commission
SFO	Serious Fraud Office
SIB	Special Investigations Board
SGMC	State Gold Mining Corporation
SMA	Societas Missionum ad Afros
SMC	State Mining Companies
SMC	Supreme Military Council
SMCD	Supreme Military Council Decree
SME	Small and Medium Enterprises
SOERP	State-Owned Enterprise Reform Program
SONA	Society of National Affairs
SPG	Society for the Propagation of the Gospel
SPLiT	Social Protection and Livelihood Technical Committee
SPP	Special Public Prosecutor
SRC	Students' representative council
SFO	Social Security and National Insurance Trust
SRID	Statistics, Research and Information Directorate
STAFAMS	State Farms Corporation
Supt.	Superintendent
SWAG	Sport Writers Association of Ghana

== T ==
TAMASEC	Tamale Secondary School
TB	Trashy Bags
TBA	Traditional birth attendant
TC	Togoland Congress
TCC	Technology Consultancy Center
TCOR	Trusteeship Council Official Records
TCP	Togoland Congress Party
TDC	Tema Development Corporation
TEDB	Timber Export Development Board
TEWU	Teachers and Educational Workers' Union
TF	Third Force
TMB	Timber Marketing Board
TOR	Tema Oil Refinery
TRC	Truth and Reconciliation Commission (Ghana)
TSSP	Trade Sector Support Programme
TTI	Takoradi Technical Institute
TUC	Trades Union Congress
TVET	Technical and Vocational Education and Training
TVT	Trans-Volta Togoland

== U ==
UAC	United Africa Company
UAF	United Action Front	UENR
UDS	University for Development Studies
UG	University of Ghana
UGCC	United Gold Coast Convention Party
UGFC	United Ghana Farmers' Council
UGFCC	United Ghana Farmers' Council of Cooperatives
UGM	United Ghana Movement
UGMRC	United Ghana Muslim Representative Council
UNC	United National Congress
UNESCO	United Nations Educational, Scientific, and Cultural Organization
UNIA	Universal Negro Improvement Association
UNIFIL	United Nations Interim Force in Lebanon
UNIGOV	Union Government (Ghana)
UNP	United Nationalist Party
UNTSO	United Nations Truce Supervision Organization
UP	United Party
UST	University of Science and Technology
UTAG	University Teachers Association of Ghana
UUY	Universal United Youth Organization
UVC	Universal Village Consult (ask vvu - tc)

== V ==
VAG	Veterans Association of Ghana
VALCO	Volta Aluminium Company
VBGC	Veranda Boys and Girls Club
VBRP	Volta Basin Research Project
VLRDP	Volta Lake Research and Development Project
VORADEC	Volta Regional Agricultural Development Corporation
VORADEP	Volta Regional Agricultural Development Project
VRA	Volta River Authority
VRCC	Volta Regional Co-ordinating Council
VRP	Volta River Project
VSD	Veterinary Service Directorate
VVU	Valley View University

== W ==
WAAC	West African Airways Corporation
WACA	West African Court of Appeal
WAEC	West African Examinations Council
WAFF	West African Frontier Force
WAGP	West African Gas Pipeline
WAMI	West African Monetary Institute
WAMZ	West African Monetary Zone
WANEP	West Africa Network for Peacebuilding
WANS	West African National Secretariat
WASEC	Wa Secondary School
WASSCE	West Africa Senior Secondary Certificate Examination
WASU	West African Students' Union
WAYL	West African Youth League
WDC	Workers' Defence Committee
WREDEC	Western Regional Development Corporation

== Y ==
YAG	Youth Association of Ghana
YEN	Youth Employment Network
YPM	Young Pioneer Movement
YSG	Youth Study Group
