= Tsonam Cleanse Akpeloo =

Ghanaian businessman

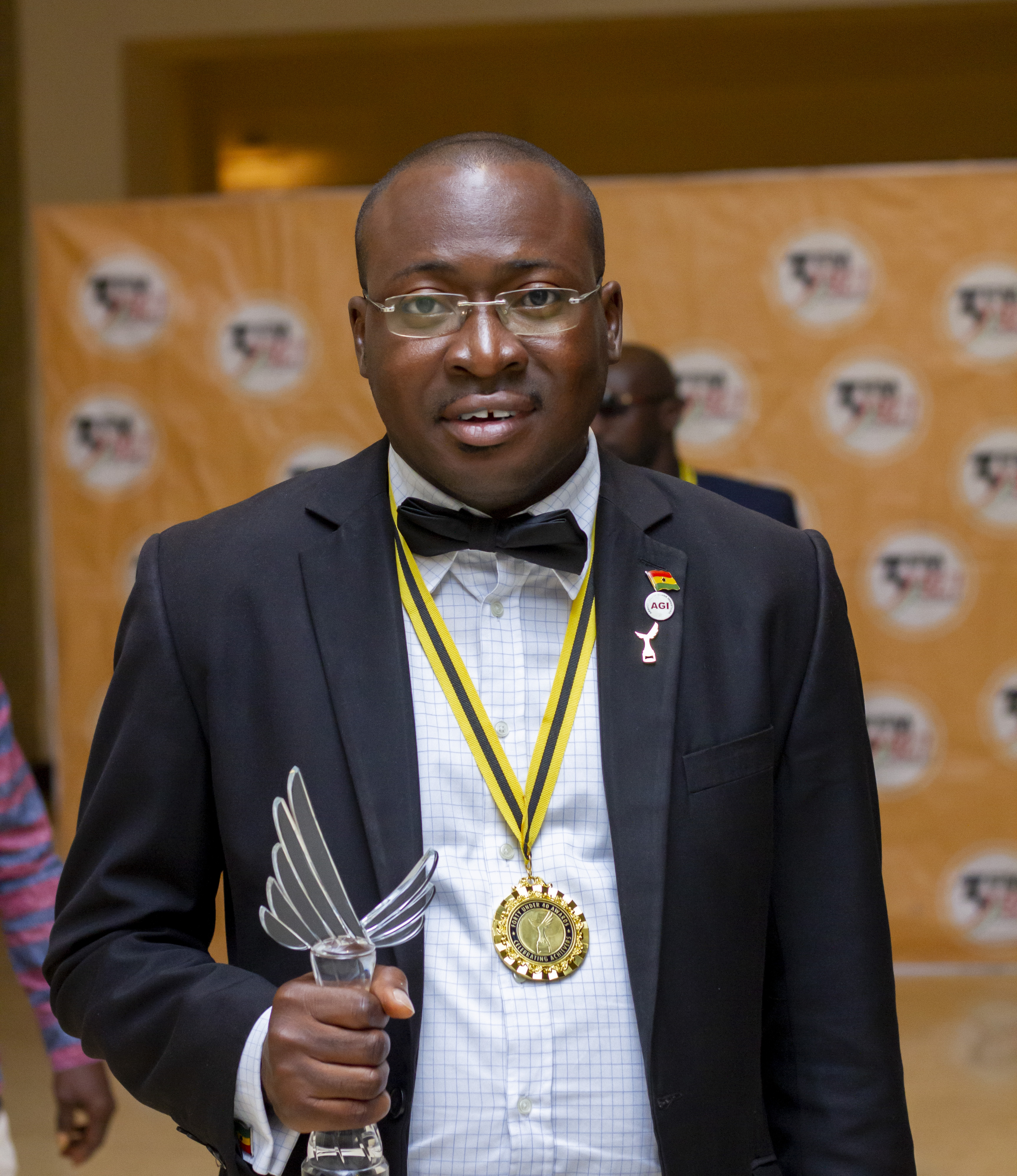
- Born: Tsonam Akpeloo
- Education: Ghana Technology University; Clark Atlanta Business School; Stanford Graduate School of Business; University of Ghana
- Occupations: Economist, technology entrepreneur
- Employer: SUKU Technologies
- Board member of: Association of Ghana Industries Accra

Tsonam Cleanse Akpeloo is a Ghanaian economist and technology entrepreneur. He is the CEO of SUKU Technologies and chairman for the Greater Accra Region for the Association of Ghana Industries (AGI).

In December 2024, he was elected Chairperson of the Trade and Industry Cluster of the African Union Economic, Social, and Cultural Council (AU ECOSOCC), becoming the first West African to hold the position.

== Early life and education ==
Akpeloo holds a bachelor of Arts degree in economics and political science, and a master's degree in economic policy management from the University of Ghana. He had a post-graduate degree in Management Information Systems from the Ghana Technology University, and also studied Jungian Psychology from the Institute of Humanities and Social Sciences, Gavel University, Sweden.

He also holds a Master’s in Business Creation from the Eccles School of Business at Utah University, US.

He is a product of Clark Atlanta Business School (United States) and Stanford SEED Programme of Stanford Graduate School of Business. Akpeloo is an alumnus of the African Liberty Academy and Diplo Foundation, and holds a Diploma in Financial Management from the Chartered Institute of Marketing.

== Career ==
Tsonam is an IT professional and currently the chief executive officer of SUKU Technologies and acting chairman of the Association of Ghana Industries. He is also the co-founder and chief executive officer of Techcom Visions, an IT solutions firm in Ghana. Tsonam is the national chairman of the ICT sector of the Ghana National Chamber of Commerce and Industry (GNCCI). He also acts as a board member of several institutions including and Accra Technical University, NVTI CMMTI and Methodist University College of Ghana. He is the leader of Kadodo Africa, an advanced gateway that profiles, checks, verifies and advances organizations in Ghana and Africa to situate them for the advantages of the Africa Continental Free Trade Area (AfCFTA).

Within Ghana, Akpeloo has been active in industrial advocacy and trade policy. He is Chair of the Greater Accra branch of the Association of Ghana Industries (AGI) and has served as National Chair of the ICT sector of the Ghana National Chamber of Commerce and Industry (GNCCI).

He also sits on the boards of institutions including Accra Technical University, the Construction Machinery and Mechanics Training Institute (CMMTI) of the NVTI, and Methodist University College Ghana.

Akpeloo became engaged with the African Union Economic, Social, and Cultural Council (AU ECOSOCC) in 2014, when he was elected as one of its youngest members and served as Youth Advisor. In December 2024, he was elected Chairperson of the Trade and Industry Cluster of AU ECOSOCC at its 4th Permanent General Assembly held in Nairobi, Kenya.

His election marked the first time a West African assumed the role, which involves shaping strategies for industrialization, trade, and economic integration within the AU framework.

== Views and advocacy ==
Akpeloo has advocated for tax reforms to strengthen local manufacturing. In March 2025, he criticized the taxation of raw materials used by domestic producers, while imported finished goods faced lower tariffs. He argued that this policy discouraged production and employment within Ghana and called for a tax regime that incentivizes local industry.

He also warned that businesses complying with tax regulations were increasingly burdened with additional levies. To address this, he proposed broadening Ghana’s tax base, raising the tax-to-GDP ratio from around 13.8 percent to between 18 and 20 percent, so that compliant firms would not bear a disproportionate share of taxation.

Akpeloo has urged government to modernize revenue collection by extending taxation into the digital economy. He proposed the inclusion of online transactions, cryptocurrency, and foreign exchange trading within Ghana’s tax framework, citing India’s adoption of similar models as a precedent.

He has emphasized the impact of utility costs on industrial competitiveness, noting that electricity accounted for nearly 30 percent of manufacturing expenses in Ghana. He called for reductions in tariffs and clearer policies to support indigenous firms, particularly within the framework of the African Continental Free Trade Area (AfCFTA).

At the Association of Ghana Industries (AGI) Annual General Meeting in 2024, Akpeloo encouraged industries to invest in education and training to strengthen workforce capacity. He highlighted partnerships with universities, vocational institutions, and government agencies as essential to bridging the skills gap. AGI initiatives under his leadership included job fairs and industrial site visits to connect students and employers.

Since 2020, Akpeloo has stressed the need for Ghanaian industries to develop strategies aligned with AfCFTA. He identified access to affordable capital and reductions in production costs as key measures to enhance the competitiveness of Ghanaian firms in continental trade.

== Awards ==
In 2012, he was named Young Entrepreneur of the Year by the United Nations Development Programme (UNDP), followed by the Africa’s Young Visionary Entrepreneur Award from African Leadership Magazine (UK) in 2013. The following year, he was included among Africa’s Top 35 under 35 CEOs in the Achievement Awards.

In 2020, Akpeloo received the Forty Under 40 Award in Technology and Innovation at the Ghana Forty Under 40 Awards. He was later honored as the Entrepreneur of the Year in 2024 and as CEO of the Year (SME Category) at the Ghana CEO Awards in 2025.

He is also a Fellow of the Institute of Chartered Economists–Ghana (ICEG), recognized for his contributions to economic and entrepreneurial development.

In addition to these distinctions, Akpeloo has been selected for several international fellowships, including the Jack Ma Foundation’s Alibaba eFounders Fellowship, the Mandela Washington Fellowship, the UNDP Youth Connekt Fellowship, and the Tony Elumelu Entrepreneurship Programme. He also received President Obama’s USADF Grant Prize for Young African Leaders.
