= Earl Ankrah =

Ghananian journalist

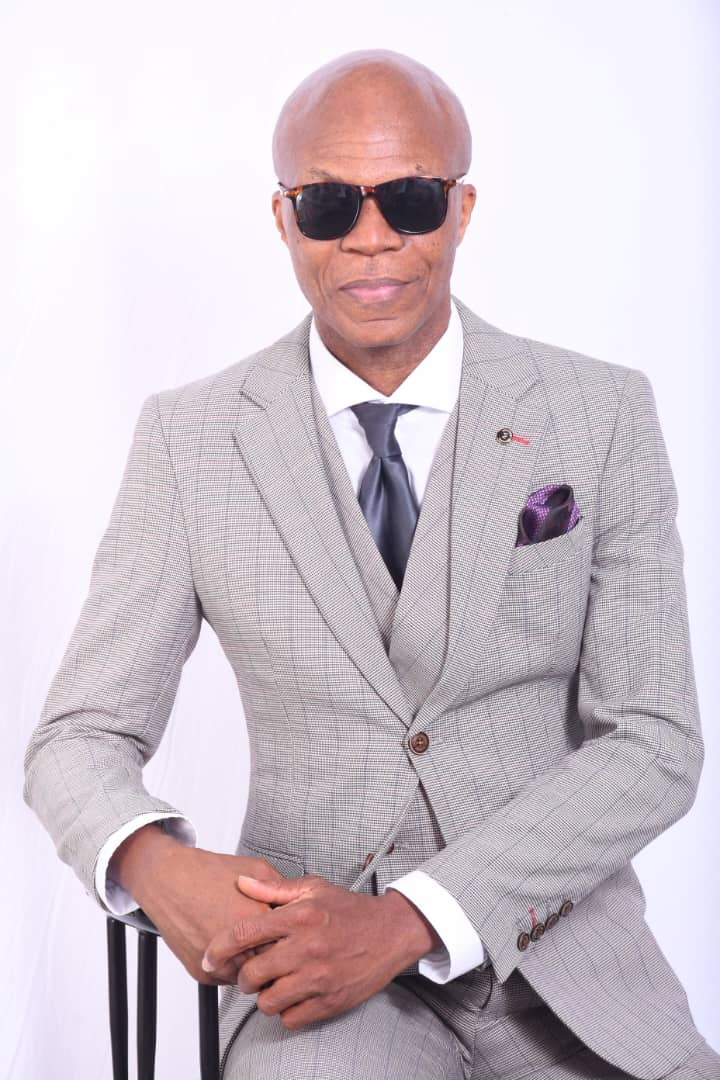
- Citizenship: Ghanaian
- Education: * Datus Preparatory Primary School; * Accra Academy; * Ghana Institute of Journalism; * Graduate School of Management, UK & Ghana; * National Institute of Labor Economics Research and Development, New Delhi (Masters in Human Resource Planning and Development)
- Occupations: Policy Communications Practitioner; PR Specialist; Broadcast-Journalism Consultant; and Macro-Level HR Expert
- Organization(s): West Africa Food System Resilience Programme, Fair Wages and Salaries Commission, Ghana Television (GTV) of the Ghana Broadcasting Corporation

Emmanuel Earl Ankrah professionally known as Earl Ankrah is a former national television show originator and host; and currently an International Development Specialist in Communications and Knowledge Management.

== Education ==
Earl Ankrah attended Accra Academy, where he was a chapel prefect; the Ghana Institute of Journalism, where he obtained a Diploma in Journalism; the Graduate School of Management (UK and Accra campuses) where he took a graduate course in Public Relations and then the National Institute of Labour Economics Research and Development, New Delhi, where he read an MA in Human Resource Planning and Development.

Prior to these, Earl was posted to teach at Nmanduanu Basic School in the Sissala East District as national service personnel. He later extended his national service period by 1 year. During this period, he introduced night schools, a non-formal education program in Kuroboi where he used his personal lamp under a tree to teach adults how to read and write. The intervention went ahead to win awards twice in the Wellembele Circuit, within the non formal education division. His intervention produced degree holders, educationists, a head teacher, a police inspector, public health officials, warehouse/inventory supervisors, businessmen, etc.

== Career ==
Earl Ankrah is widely acknowledged as the creator and pioneer of breakfast television in Ghana. He was the originator and co-host of the Ghana Broadcasting Corporation's The Breakfast Show. In his very early stages on television, Earl introduced a flexible and engaging presentation style that won him admiration and earned him coveted awards. His fluid chemistry with his co-anchor Akushika Acquaye, sparked rumours in the country about them being in a relationship.

Earl Ankrah is idolized by Ghanaian celebrity, including award-winning television anchors who refer to him as "Legendary Earl Ankrah". Award-winning media personalities attribute their success in their career to Earl Ankrah. Popular TV personality, Nana Aba Anamoah, in an emotional interview, credited Mr. Ankrah for training and mentoring her for television. He's the originator and host of the Ghana Broadcasting Corporation's Breakfast Show. Ankrah hosted EA Live!, an avant-garde magazine talk programme, which he purposed to run for one season only.

Earl Ankrah's professional roles include serving as the Ag. Director for Research, Monitoring & Evaluation and Head of Public Affairs at Fair Wages and Salaries Commission, (the state organisation responsible for determining and negotiating salaries of public sector employees in Ghana), under the Ministry of Employment and Labour Relations. He has played a pivotal role in the implementation of the Single Spine Pay Policy and the management of Government-Labour relations. His works with the Ministry, which involved high-level negotiations and partnerships with Labour Unions have taken him close to world leaders like British Prime Minister Theresa May, French President Emmanuel Macron and Luxembourg Prime Minister Xavier Bettel.

As an International Development Specialist for Communications and Knowledge Management, Earl Ankrah is currently the Communications & Knowledge Management Specialist of the West Africa Food System Resilience Programme [FSRP], a World Bank sub-regional regional and Government of Ghana project, coordinated by the Economic Community of West African States (ECOWAS).

He has also done some marketing consultancy for Best Western Premiere (Airport Hotel) in Accra.

== Interviews ==
Earl in his Broadcast-Journalism career, has conducted interviews in Ghana, Africa and the world, with personalities including politicians, sports and entertainment icons. In Ghana, he's done interviews with former President John Kufuor, previously Vice President and now President John Dramani Mahama and other politicians, including Ministers of State, Members of Parliament, Ambassadors, High Commissioners and Diplomats. He's hosted coaches and players of the national football team of Ghana, ‘The Black Stars’; finalists and crown bearers of the Miss Ghana, Miss Universe-Ghana and Miss Malaika Ghana beauty pageants. His interviews on the African continent include that with Meiway, Manu Dibango, Lucky Dube, Youssou N'Dour, Osibisa, Arrow (South American calypso legend), and Godfrey Moloy (Godfather of Soweto). Earl has also hosted globally known faces including Reverend Jesse Jackson and Sir Roger Moore (James Bond) among others.

== Advocacy ==
Earl Ankrah is drawn to a varied number of interests that he advocates public and government attention for. He is an advocate for women's and children's rights, through works at Ghana's Ministry of Employment and Labour Relations. He believes women must strive to add value to their skills throughout their career lives as that is the surest way to enhance their financial status at the work place. He also promotes civil liberties, environmental protection concerns. He champions the need to exercise political neutrality in judgement and decision making. In 2020, he defended two high-level politicians of different political lineages: former Information Minister, Kojo Oppong Nkrumah (of the New Patriotic Party) and Vice Presidential candidate, now Vice President, Professor Jane Naana Opoku Agyemang (of the National Democratic Congress), both of whom were former radio presenters, who moderated the 2012 presidential debate. They came under public backlash in 2020, for moderating the debate (back in 2012) whiles harboring political ambitions. Earl has previously managed and mentored some Ghanaian music heartthrobs, including Okyeame Kwame, Kontihene, Ded Buddy among others. In year 2000, Ankrah led Akyeame to perform at the Apollo Theater and DAR Constitution Hall.

Earl is also an avid writer on a broad spectrum of issues, through an entertaining play on words and sharp wit. His articles seek to pivot public attention away from entrenched biases and stagnant norms, towards more open-minded, progressive and realistic new-day approaches to divisive issues around the world (especially in Ghana and the United States). In some of his writings, like "Blue's Clues", he nudged then US President-Elect Joe Biden not to try too hard to win Republican support, in his bid to fulfil his campaign promises, as that is highly likely to prove futile; but rather tap into his real "rough Joe" self to achieve rapid results, before his term runs out. In "The Trial of Donald J. Trump", Ankrah criticises the irony of American democracy, which makes a series of constitutional provisions (between election day and January 6), that permit Trump to overturn election results; yet he's vilified for attempting to do so. In "Gunsmoke and Mirrors", he criticised Ghana's security agencies and the judiciary for the "clumsy" conviction and incarceration of Charles Antwi (a mentally unstable man), who had confessed his intent to assassinate the President of Ghana. Ankrah's article, supported the efforts of others who took legal action, leading to the release of the convict from BNI custody.

In December 2024, The World Bank co-authored an article with Earl Ankrah titled "Home to Roost!" on the World Bank's injection of $12m into the Ghanaian poultry industry.

== Awards ==
Year	Nominee / work	Award	Result
2019	ECOWAS (ECREEE)	ECOWAS Center for Renewable Energy and Energy Efficiency (Recognition)	Won
2002	Promoting Ghana Tourism	Tourism Award	Won
2002	Viewers Choice	RTV TV Personality of the Year	Won
2001	Viewers Choice	RTV TV Personality of the Year 2001	Won
1997	Radio & TV Reviews (Magazine)	TV's Favorite Face 1997	Won
