= Grace Amey-Obeng =

Ghanaian entrepreneur

Founder and CEO, Forever Clair
- Incumbent
- Assumed office ?

National Treasurer, Association of Ghana Industries
- In office November 2017 - ?

Personal details
- Occupation: Entrepreneur

Grace Amey-Obeng is a Ghanaian entrepreneur and founder of Forever Clair (FC) beauty products in Accra.

== Biography ==
Grace Amey-Obeng is the founder and chief executive officer of Forever Clair Group of companies. In November 2017, she stood for and was elected executive member and held the position of National Treasurer of the Association of Ghana Industries, a Ghanaian non-governmental organisation made up of voluntary business associations of more than 1200 members drawn from small, medium and large scale enterprises.

As an entrepreneur, Amey-Obeng stresses the need for "corporate philanthropy... as an effective, strategic and sustainable method of providing necessary assistance in key areas of need". In 2017, she served as board chairperson for the Universal Merchant Bank Foundation that was created as a means of giving back to the nation of Ghana.

In May 2017, she was honoured at the second event of the Ghana Women of the Year Honours in the category of "Excellence in Business".

Amey-Obeng is the chairperson for the Ghana Cosmetology and Wellness Federation, an organisation that was formed with collaboration from the Ghana Ministry of Trade and Industry and Ministry of Tourism, Culture and Creative Arts, to help associations within the cosmetology and wellness industry "to safeguard the health of patrons"
