= Akuffo =

Akuffo (also Akufo) is an Akan language patronymic surname with Akuapem-Akropong origins. Notable people with the surname include:

- Asare Akuffo, Ghanaian accountant, banker and entrepreneur
- Edward Akufo-Addo (1906–1979), President of Ghana from 1970 to 1972
- Emily Akuffo (1933 or 1934–2022), First Lady of Ghana from 1978 to 1979
- Fred Akuffo (1937–1979), Ghanaian soldier and politician
- George Akuffo Dampare (born 1970), Ghanaian police officer
- Gloria Akuffo, Ghanaian lawyer and politician
- Hannah Akuffo (born 1954), Ghanaian academic
- Kwame Akuffo Anoff-Ntow, Ghanaian academic, journalist and broadcasting executive
- Nana Akufo-Addo (born 1944), President of Ghana from 2017 to 2025
- Oseadeeyo Kwasi Akuffo III (born 1986), Ghanaian traditional ruler
- Ohenewa Akuffo (born 1979), Canadian freestyle wrestler
- Sophia Akuffo, Ghanaian lawyer and judge

== See also ==
- Kouffo
