= Motor Transport and Traffic Directorate =

Agency overview
- Formed: 1952
- Jurisdiction: Ghana
- Headquarters: Ghana
- Minister responsible: ACP Angwutubuge Awuni
- Parent agency: Ghana Police Service
- Child agency: National Road Safety Commission

The Motor Transport and Traffic Directorate (MTTD) is an agency under the Ghana Police Service. MTTD is responsible for road safety in Ghana.

== History ==
The MTTD was established in 1952. MTTD was known as the Ghana Police Traffic Unit. In 1981, the Justice Archer commission, reviewed the MTTD's function and accredited it as the National MTTD.

== Head ==
The MTTD is headed by the Commander of the MTTD. The MTTD's head reports to the Inspector General of Police(IGP). The current head of the MTTD is ACP Sarpong.

== Functions ==
The MTTD educates road users on accident-free road practices by training motorists and pedestrians. The members of the MTTD are trained to spot, warn and arrest offending motorists. The MTTD records all accidents and publishes the statistics on a quarterly basis in print and electronic media. Personnel of the MTTD control traffic and enforce traffic regulations. The MTTD is in-charge of escort for the President of Ghana, state and foreign dignitaries. In the investigation of road accidents, the MTTD initiates the investigation and later hands it over to the DVLA.

== Personnel ==
The MTTD has 1500 personnel nationwide. These personnel are trained by the various Ghana Police Service training academies and posted to all the district police stations to work hand in hand with the police personnel in ensuring road safety in the area.

== Collaborating agencies ==
The MTTD in the pursuit of its functions works with other agencies of state to reduce road accidents. They include:

- National Road Safety Commission (NRSC)
- Driver and Vehicle Licensing Authority(DVLA)
- Ghana Police Service

== Accident prevention ==
The Motor Transport and Traffic Directorate promotes road safety through a structured programme it employs named the four Es. They are:

- Enactment of laws and traffic regulations to govern road use in Ghana
- Education for road users
- Engineering the construction of feeder and urban roads, Zebra crossing and road signs
- Emergency medical services for accident victims

== Accident statistics ==
Road accidents are a very important national issue. Statistics show that road accidents kill an average of four people a day in Ghana. In 2005, there was 16% increase in road accidents as compared to the preceding year. Between 2007 and 2010 the MTTD reported that at least 6000 people had died due to road accidents with an additional 40000 injured within the same interval.

== Road offenders ==
From January to May 2011, the MTTD convicted about 1800 road users for various road offenses with fines totally 400,000 cedi (approximately 260,000 dollars) being charged. Offenders who were found guilty of grave road offenses within the period where jailed.

== Challenges ==
The MTTD in the pursuit of its functions faces challenges that limits its functions. They include:

- Inadequate law enforcement equipment such as breathalyzer
- Limited towing and recovering trucks for broken down vehicles

== Funding ==
The MTTD is a branch of the Ghana Police Service and is under the Ministry of Interior. MTTD is financed by the police budget. The National Road Safety Commission supports the MTTD by providing logistics.
