= Timeline of strikes in 2022 =

Strikes in 2022

A number of labour strikes, labour disputes, and other industrial actions have occurred in 2022.

== Background ==
A labour strike is a work stoppage, caused by the mass refusal of employees to work, usually in response to employee grievances, such as low pay or poor working conditions. Strikes can also take place to demonstrate solidarity with workers in other workplaces or to pressure governments to change policies.

== Timeline ==
=== Continuing strikes from 2021 ===
- 2021–2022 Columbia University strike: involving graduate student workers at Columbia University in New York, in the United States;
- 2018–2022 Haitian protests;
- 2021–22 Major League Baseball lockout: lockout of Major League Baseball players in the United States and Canada after expiry of the collective bargaining agreement;
- 2021–2022 Myanmar protests: part of the opposition to the 2021 Myanmar coup d'état;
- 2018–2023 United Kingdom higher education strikes

=== January ===
- 2022 Kroger strike;
- UTAG strike 2022: strike by members of the University Teachers Association of Ghana against worsening conditions for university teachers;
- BC Transit Sea to Sky strike: strike by Unifor workers seeking better pay, starting on 29 January and ending on 14 June. The strike became the longest running in British Columbia history on 1 June, surpassing the 123 day record set by 2001 Metro Vancouver strikes.

=== February ===
- 2022 Puerto Rico public sector strike;
- 2022 Nigerian university strike: strike by members of the Academic Staff Union of Universities;
- 2022 Sibanye-Stillwater strike;
- 2022 Viet Glory Company Limited strike: strike by leather shoe manufacturing workers over low pay;

=== March ===
- 2022 Indian general strike;
- 2022 Minneapolis teachers strike;
- 2022 Sacramento teachers strike;
- 2022 Spanish embassies strike, by staff at Spanish embassies and consulates across the globe.
- 2022 Spanish truckers strike;
- 2022 Sri Lankan protests;

=== April ===
- 2022 British barristers' industrial action: labour action by barristers in England and Wales in protest of freezes and cuts in wages;
- 2022 Macedonian teachers strike;

=== May ===
- 2022 CFL strike: strike by Canadian Football League players;
- 2022 Rempel Bros Concrete strike: strike by concrete workers in British Columbia, Canada;

=== June ===
- 2022 Codelco strike: strike by Codelco workers in Chile;
- 2022 Ecuadorian protests: general strike against the social and economic policies of President Guillermo Lasso, in Ecuador;
- 2022 South Korean truckers strike;
- 2022 Tunisian judges strike;
- 2022–2023 United Kingdom railway strikes: strike by National Union of Rail, Maritime and Transport Workers members against low wages and proposed cuts of safety-critical jobs, (ongoing as of February 2023);
- 2022 Zimbabwe nurses strikes;
- 2022 British barristers' industrial action: strike by the Criminal Bar Association in England and Wales;

=== July ===
- 2022 Nigerian breadmakers strike: strike by Premium Breadmakers Association of Nigeria workers over increases in the cost of breadmaking materials;
- 2022 Panamanian protests;
- 2022 Scandinavian Airlines strike;

=== August ===
- 2022 Sierra Leone doctors strike: A strike of medical doctors across Sierra Leone launched to force a restoration of COVID-19 financial benefits and long-promised fuel subsidies. The strike began on 1 August and ended in victory on 5 August.
- 2022 United Kingdom Amazon workers strikes: wildcat strikes over pay offers at Amazon warehouses in Tilbury, Rugeley and Swindon; The Big Issue reported that after a week, eight warehouses were participating in the strike action, with "slowdown" campaigns in five warehouses where workers process one package an hour to ensure they still get paid.
- 2022 Felixstowe dock workers strike: eight day strike starting on 21 August by 1,900 workers over pay offers at Felixstowe Docks
- 2022 Royal Mail strikes: four days of industrial action in August and September by 115,000 Royal Mail postal workers over pay offers.

=== September ===
- 2022 Liverpool dock workers strikes: two weeks of strikes starting on 20 September by 560 workers at Liverpool Docks over pay offers.

=== October ===
- 2022 Liverpool dock workers strikes: continuation of industrial action in September with control room staff also joining the strike. 600 workers went on strike from 11 to 17 October. Another two week strike started on 24 October.
- Mahsa Amini protests: shopkeepers, factory workers, and teachers go on strike and conduct industrial action over government oppression, pensions, pay, and layoffs.

=== November ===
- 2022 Liverpool dock workers strikes: continuation of industrial action beginning in September and strikes starting on 24 October. Further strikes planned for 14 November were called off after workers voted to accept pay rises worth between 14.3% and 18.5%.
- 2022 Kenya Airways strike: strike by pilots of Kenya Airways;
- 2022 HarperCollins strike: strike by workers of the HarperCollins publishing corporation, supported by the United Auto Workers union;
- 2022 University of California academic workers' strike: strike by academic workers at the University of California.
- 2022 New School adjunct professors strike
- 2022 Hungarian teacher's strike: nationwide protests in multiple schools by teachers, students, and parents
- 2022 Austrian rail strike: one-day strike on 27 November;

=== December ===
- 2022 Fort Wayne Philharmonic Orchestra strike: strike by the musicians of the Fort Wayne Philharmonic Orchestra, supported by the American Federation of Musicians;
- 2022 The New York Times strike: 1,100 members of the NewsGuild union employed at The New York Times go on a 24-hour walkout on 8 December over contracts and pay.
- 2022 National Health Service strikes: Up to 100,000 nurses across 65 NHS trusts in England, Wales and Northern Ireland stage 12 hour strikes on 15 and 20 December over pay. Strikes in Scotland were suspended after an improved pay settlement was offered.
- 2022 Starbucks strikes: Three-day strike by workers at 100 Starbucks stores across the United States to protest anti-union policies by the chain;

== See also ==
- List of strikes
