= Phyllis Osei =

Ghanaian police officer

Phyllis Ama Tebuah Osei is a Ghanaian superintendent police officer. In November 2018, she was adjudged the United Nations Female Police Officer of the Year Award, formerly known as the International Female Police Peacekeeper Award in recognition for her service during the United Nations Somalia, (UNSOM) Peacekeeping Mission in February. Nana Akuffo-Addo congratulated her for winning this award when he was giving his 62nd Independence Anniversary speech on Wednesday in Tamale in the Northern region.

== Education ==
She is an old student of St Roses Senior High School. Osei had her training as a police officer from the Ghana Police Academy. She graduated in May 2007 as an assistant superintendent of police.

== Career ==
She joined the Ghana Police Service in 2006 and has since then worked in various departments at the Ghana Police headquarters including the registry unit, the international relations/peace keeping unit and the Domestic Violence and Victims Support Unit (DOVVSU). Prior to that, she worked as a teaching assistant at the University of Ghana and also with two non-governmental agencies, Streetwise and Orphanaid Africa. As of 2018, She was known to be serving with the UN Mission in Somalia (UNSOM). Some of the impactful projects she initiated include an adult literacy training for 49 female police officers in Jubaland and a Female Peacekeeper Network (FPN) within UNSOM and AMISOM to provide support to female peacekeepers. In November 2018, she was adjudged the United Nations Female Police Officer of the Year Award, formerly known as the International Female Police Peacekeeper Award in recognition for her service during the United Nations Somalia, (UNSOM) Peacekeeping Mission in February

== See also ==
- Sangya Malla – winner of United Nations Female Police Officer of the Year Award 2021
