= Sangya Malla =

Nepalese women police officer

Sangya Malla (Nepali: संज्ञा मल्ल) is a Superintendent in Nepal Police currently serving as the Chief of the MONUSCO police health and environment unit in Kinshasa, Congo. She was awarded the UN Woman Police Officer of the Year in 2021 for her contribution to provide medical support to the people of Congo during COVID-19 pandemic and outbreaks of Ebola virus. Her unit also worked in the natural and humanitarian crises during the eruption of Goma volcano in May 2021.

== Career ==
Malla belongs to the medical division of Nepal police. She joined Nepal Police in 2009 as an inspector. She served in the medical team of United Nations Stabilization Mission in Haiti (MINUSTAH) from 2016 to 2017. Since 2017, she is serving as the Chief of the MONUSCO police health and environment unit in Kinshasa.

In Congo, her unit organized over 300 awareness sessions for COVID-19 prevention. They also conducted various environmental protection programs for the locals.

== Awards ==
- UN Woman Police Officer of the Year - 9th November 2021.

== See also ==
- Phyllis Osei- UN Woman Police Officer of the Year - 2018.
