= Asare Akuffo =

Ghanaian accountant

Asare Akuffo is a Ghanaian accountant, banker and entrepreneur. He is the former managing director of Home Finance Company, now Republic bank a pioneer bank in the housing finance industry. He is the president of the Private Enterprise Foundation, the umbrella body of businesses in Ghana.

== Educational life ==
Akuffo holds a degree in Administration from the University of Ghana and a certificate in Housing Finance from the University of Pennsylvania. He is a Chartered Accountant and member of the Institute of Chartered Accountants, Ghana. He attended Swedru Secondary School.

== Religion ==
Akuffo was a staunch Presbyterian and worships with Covenant Presbyterian Church of Ghana Dzorwulu. He served as a senior presbyter of the Covenant Presbyterian Church of Ghana, Dzorwulu.

== Personal life ==
Dr Asare Akuffo is married to Mrs Asare Akuffo and are blessed with three children.

On June 3, 2019, he was reported dead.

== Professional life ==
Having worked as an investment manager at the Social Security and National Insurance Trust, Akuffo joined Home Finance Company as a member of the pioneer management team in 1990. He was appointed Finance Director in 1995 and later the Deputy Managing Director in 2003 when HFC converted to a bank. From the 1990s he had oversight over the investment-banking arm of the company with asserts of over 250 million cedis. In 2005 he was made the managing director of HFC Bank Ghana Limited.

== Executive positions ==
Akuffo was elected president of the Ghana Association of Bankers. During his presidency, he aided the setting up of the Banking and Finance Chair at the KNUST School of Business with an annual sponsorship of US$20,000 for research and development activities and developed the Annual Business Plan competition for students of the KNUST School of Business.

In 2013 he served on various executive and non-executive positions in public and private institutions. They include the National Partnership for Children's Trust, the Ghana Union Assurance Life Company, the Student Loan Trust, the African Union for Housing Finance, Ghana Interbank Payment and Settlement Systems Limited and KNUST Centre for Business Development. He is the current President of the Private Enterprise Foundation, the umbrella body of businesses in Ghana. He is the lead advocate for Ghanaian business.

== Honours ==
In 2009 he was elected as the President of the Governing Council of the Private Enterprise Foundation. The Governing Council of Private Enterprise Foundation is an authority body made up of representatives of all the major corporate institutions in the Ghana. On 18 December 2013, the Kwame Nkrumah University of Science and Technology conferred an honorary doctor of letters on him. 2015 he grabs lifetime achievement award The Private Enterprise Federation (PEF) honours Asare Akuffo for his excellence in leadership and efficient performance which had made the federation stronger as the pivotal voice of the private sector
