= Private Enterprise Foundation =

Organization in Ghana

The Private Enterprise Foundation (PEF) is the umbrella organization for all private Ghanaian businesses.

The Private Enterprise Foundation, now known as the Federation, was established in 1994 as the leading institution responsible for uniting the private sector and championing advocacy efforts. Its creation was initiated by major business organizations, including the Association of Ghana Industries, the Ghana National Chamber of Commerce and Industry, the Ghana Employers’ Association, and the Federation of Associations of Ghanaian Exporters. The foundation also received support from the United States Agency for International Development (USAID).

== The Governing council ==
The Governing Council of the PEF is the highest decision making body of the Foundation. The council has representative of member associations and it is made up of the Ghana National Chamber of Commerce and Industry (GNCCI), Ghana Employers Association (GEA), Federations of Associations of Ghanaian Exporters (FAGE), Association of Ghana Industries (AGI), Ghana Association of Bankers (GAB) & Ghana Chamber of Mines (GCM).

== Executive Members ==
The PEF is headed by Asare Akuffo.
