= 2022–2024 National Health Service strikes =

Healthcare strike

2022 National Health Service strikes
- Part of the 2021–present UK cost-of-living crisis and UK industrial disputes and strikes (2022–present)
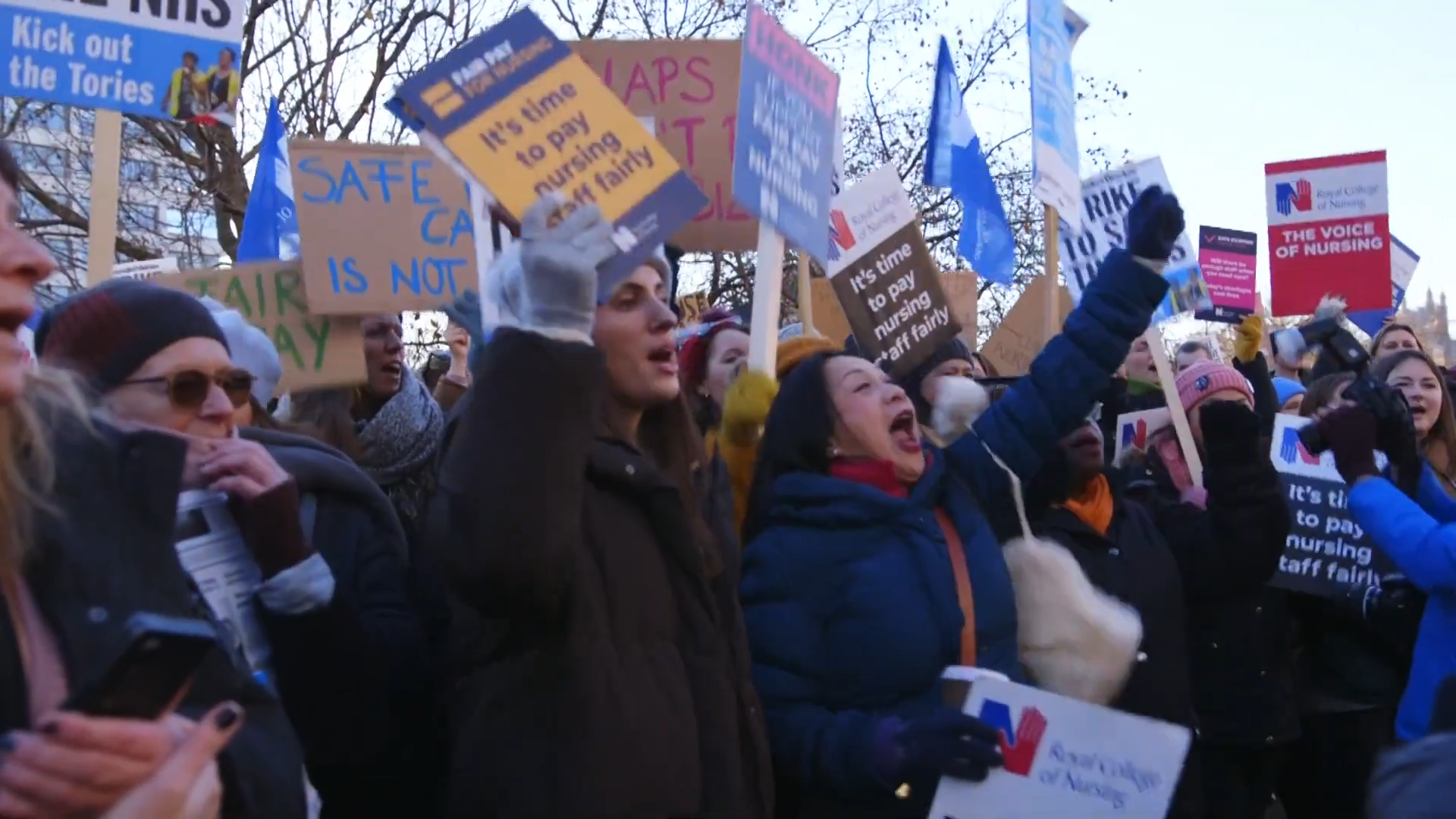
- Striking nurses, in London, 19 December 2022
- Date: 6 October 2022 – 18 September 2024
- Location: United Kingdom
- Caused by: Declining pay, working conditions
- Methods: Strikes, overtime bans
- Result: Various pay deals and agreements conducted over the period

Parties
Department of Health and Social Care; NHS England; NHS Scotland; NHS Wales; HSC Northern Ireland	RCN; GMB; UNISON; CSP; RCM; UNITE; BMA

Lead figures
Rishi Sunak; Steve Barclay; Victoria Atkins; Will Quince; Humza Yousaf; Eluned Morgan	Pat Cullen; Gary Smith; Christina McAnea; Gill Walton; Sharon Graham; Matt Eames

The 2022–2024 National Health Service (NHS) strikes were a series of concurrent industrial disputes in the publicly funded health services of the United Kingdom.

The disputes related to the several staff groups on the Agenda for Change pay scale, as well as those on the junior doctor and consultant contracts. Rather than a single confrontation, the industrial disputes took place between workers represented by several unions across various jurisdictions and many NHS trusts. This meant that the disputes were each resolved individually over a two year period. An early pay rise offer from the Scottish government avoided long-term industrial action in the area. The bulk of the disputes were resolved by summer 2023, though the junior doctor's strikes continued. Further strikes in Scotland were averted, and a final resolution for doctors in England took place in September 2024.

== Disputes ==
=== Nurses ===
The disputes commenced on 6 October 2022, when the Royal College of Nursing (RCN) announced their intention to ballot members for industrial action over a pay rise offer which was less than their requested 5% above inflation. This was the first time the union did so in their 106-year history, and was followed by a similar movement from Unison. On 10 November, RCN nurses and other medical personnel across the NHS voted to strike. The nurses stated this was due to failing wages, inflation, overwork, and underfunding caused by the United Kingdom cost-of-living crisis. Strike dates were announced at midnight on 25 November, with RCN members scheduled to engage in strike action between 08:00 and 20:00 on 15 and 20 December.

The Prime Minister, Rishi Sunak said that the pay offer to nurses was "appropriate and fair". The Times reported on 8 December that Sunak was preparing to restrict the rights of NHS workers to strike, including proposals to ban ambulance workers and paramedics from striking. Jake Berry (the former Chairman of the Conservative Party), Dan Poulter (a former minister in the Department of Health), and Robert Buckland (the former Justice Secretary) called on Sunak to negotiate with unions. In Prime Minister's Questions on 14 December, Leader of the Opposition Keir Starmer said that the NHS strikes were "a badge of shame" for the government and that Sunak was in "hibernation" instead of trying to avert the disruption. Eluned Morgan, the Minister for Health and Social Services in the Welsh government, said she was "saddened" by the NHS strikes but that the Welsh government could not increase their pay offer without "substantial cuts to staffing and essential services" or an increase in investment from Westminster. On 14–16 December 2022 a poll for The Observer by Opinium found 60% of voters said they supported nurses going on strike, with 29% opposing the strikes.

Strikes were also scheduled on 18 and 19 January 2023. On 16 January 2023, the RCN announced a further two strike days for England and Wales on 6 and 7 February, which were described as the biggest so far. A pay offer was ultimately made of 4.5% to 6% pay rise depending on grade along with improvements to homeworking allowance, occupational car user allowance and London allowance. This was accepted by the union on 26 September 2023.

=== Ambulance workers ===
On 30 November 2022, the GMB announced that more than 10,000 ambulance workers had voted to strike in nine NHS trusts across England and Wales for the first time since between September 1989 and February 1990. The affected trusts were the South Western, South East Coast, North West, South Central, North East, East Midlands, West Midlands, Welsh, and Yorkshire ambulance services. The union called two 24-hour strikes on 21 and 28 December.

UNISON members at ambulance services in London, Yorkshire, the North West, the North East, and the South West also are to go on strike on 21 December, from noon until midnight. Unite the Union announced that over 1,600 of its workers in ambulance services in the West Midlands, the North West, and the North East would walk out on 21 December after workers voted by up to 92% for strike action.

Last-minute talks on 20 December between Health Secretary Steve Barclay and union leaders fell through after the government refused to make a new pay offer. Will Quince, the Minister of State for Health, advised against "risky activity" or participating in contact sports during the strike. Stephen Powis, the national medical director of NHS England, asked people to only ring 999 in life-threatening emergencies and to take "sensible steps to keep themselves and others safe", including drinking responsibly and checking up on vulnerable family members and neighbours. Manchester United decided to reduce capacity at Old Trafford by 12,000 for their Carabao Cup match against Burnley F.C. due to the strike. The matches between Newcastle United and AFC Bournemouth and between Southampton F.C. and Lincoln City had already been rescheduled to 20 December because of the strikes.

The GMB strikes planned for 28 December were called off on 23 December due to the "amazing public support" and to avoid causing "any additional anxiety" over Christmas. The strike was rescheduled for 11 January 2023. On 18 January 2023, the GMB announced a further four strike days in February, including 6 February, a date that will coincide with one of the nurses strikes, creating the largest strike within the NHS so far. Ultimately a pay offer was made in England and the union accepted the proposals on April 14, 2023. A strike was averted in Scotland after a similar deal on 18 September, 2024.

=== Doctors ===
During 2022 the British Medical Association (BMA) announced a demand of pay increases to restore junior doctors' pay to match the real term pay levels of 2008. According to the union, repeated pay freezes and pay-increases below the inflation level had resulted in real-term pay cuts of nearly 30% for junior doctors since 2008. The BMA organized a strike ballot, the result of which was announced on 20 February 2023. More than 98% of respondents supported strike action, and the BMA subsequently announced a 72-hour strike starting 13 March. The strike had a significant disruptive impact, causing cancellations of an estimated 175000 appointments and procedures.

Subsequent to the strike, BMA representatives met with Secretary of State for Health and Social Care, Steve Barclay. The meeting did not result in a resolution of the disputes, and the BMA announced an additional 96-hour strike to take place starting 11 April. According to Barclay, the BMA placed a pre-condition on the talks of a 35% pay increase. This statement was publicly disputed by the BMA, which accused the government of delaying negotiations and not presenting a credible offer.

On 28 June, it was announced that NHS consultants in England would strike over pay conditions on 20 and 21 July. The BMA stated that junior doctors in England were willing to cancel strikes if the government presented a suitable pay offer, amid demands for wage increases that match inflation. A pay offer was made in January 2024, however the BMA voted against it. On 5 April 2024, it was announced that the BMA consultants in England had voted to accept a revised offer to end strikes after the previous vote to reject. One aspect of the new agreement was some reform of the DDRB, including using international comparators to help make pay recommendations. Following the 2024 general election, new negotiations were held with the incoming Labour government, which ended the dispute with Junior doctors on 17 September.

== 2022 Scottish pay offer ==
As health is a devolved matter, the Scottish government was able to act independently in this regard, and made an offer in December 2022. This was accepted by a number of the unions, and avoided industrial action in the country. The offer was worth an average of 7.5%. Humza Yousaf, the Cabinet Secretary for Health and Social Care, said that the proposal was the "best and final pay offer" available and that there was "nothing left in the coffers" to improve it further. The RCN, Royal College of Midwives (RCM), the Chartered Society of Physiotherapy (CSP), Unite, Unison and the GMB launched consultative members ballots on the offer.

Unite members accepted the pay deal, with 64% voting in favour. Sharon Graham, Unite general secretary, said that the improved pay result was "a testament to the resolve of our members". Unison members voted by 57% to accept the offer on a turnout of 63%. Yousaf said that he was "delighted" that Unite and Unison members had accepted the offer. The CSP also voted to accept the deal, with 72% of members in favour.

The RCN did not give a recommendation on whether members should accept or reject the offer, but said that it was still "below our expectations". 82% of RCN members who voted rejected the pay offer. Two thirds of GMB members voted to reject the offer. The RCM announced on 21 December that 65% of its members had voted against the pay offer. Jaki Lambert, the RCM director for Scotland, said following the vote that the offer was "simply not good enough" and that members were "prepared to take industrial action" to get a better deal.

Consequently, the RCN, the RCM and the GMB union rejected the pay offer and Unite and Unison accepted it. The Scottish government decided to go ahead with its existing pay offer after Yousaf met with union leaders on 23 December. Yousaf said that he would "do everything [he could]" to avert strikes but that there was no more money to increase the offer. The Scotsman reported on 27 December that a Savanta poll it had commissioned between 16 and 21 December showed that 66% of respondents would support nurses striking, compared to 23% in opposition.

== Strike dates ==
Date	Affected workers
2022-12-15	RCN; 44 trusts; two day strike
2022-12-21	UNISON, ambulances (LAS, NEAS, NWAS, SWAST & YAS) & 2 Liverpool trusts
2023-01-11	UNISON, ambulances (LAS, NEAS, NWAS, SWAST & YAS)
2023-01-18	RCN, 55 trusts; two day strike
2023-01-23	UNISON, ambulances (LAS, NEAS, NWAS, SWAST & YAS) & 2 Liverpool trusts
2023-02-06	RCN, 73 trusts; two day strike
2023-02-10	UNISON, ambulances (LAS, NEAS, NWAS, SWAST & YAS)
2023-03-01	RCN, 102 trusts; two day strike with night shifts extending into third day
2023-03-06	UNISON, ambulances (all except SECAM, cancelled)
2023-03-13	Junior doctors, 72 hour walkout
2023-04-11	Junior doctors, 96 hour walkout
2023-06-14	Junior doctors, 72 hour walkout
2023-07-13	Junior doctors, 120 hour walkout
2023-07-20	Consultant doctors, 48 hour walkout
2024-06-27	Junior doctors, 140 hour walkout

=== Ambulance Services abbreviations ===
- LAS - London Ambulance Service
- NEAS - North East Ambulance Service
- NWAS - North West Ambulance Service
- SECAMB - South East Coast Ambulance
- SWAST - South West Ambulance Service
- YAS - Yorkshire Ambulance Service

== See also ==
- 2015 junior doctors contract dispute in England
- United Kingdom cost-of-living crisis
- COVID-19 protests in the United Kingdom, which included some NHS worker protests
- Timeline of strikes in 2022
