= National Road Safety Authority =

National Road Safety Commission
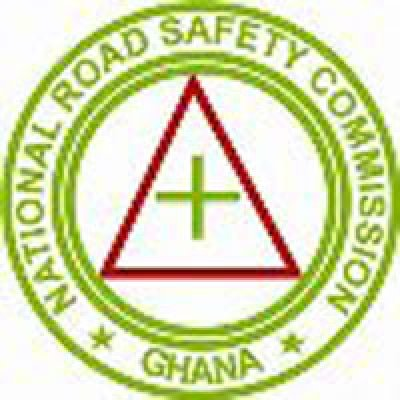

Agency overview
- Formed: 1999
- Jurisdiction: Ghana
- Headquarters: Ghana
- Minister responsible: May Obiri-Yeboah, Executive director
- Parent agency: Ghana Police Service
- Website: Official website

The National Road Safety Commission (NRSC) is a Ghanaian state agency responsible for road safety education in Ghana.

== History ==
The commission was established by an act of parliament in 1999. The commission's mandate is backed by ACT 567.

== Structure ==
The commission is under the [Ministry of Transport] of the Republic of Ghana.

== Functions of the commission ==
The mandate of the commission allows the NRSC to promote and coordinate Road Safety activities in Ghana.

== Road accident statistics ==
The function of the commission is important to all aspects of the Ghanaian economy. This is because road accidents are a national issue in Ghana. Statistics show that four people die daily on Ghanaian roads due to road accident. Estimates show that Ghana loses over 230 million dollars yearly due to road accidents with more than 1600 deaths. The loss correlates to 1.7% of the country's Gross Domestic Product. The NRSC announced in 2010 that there were 19 fatalities per 10,000 vehicles in Ghana. Statistics showed that 43% of the fatalities involved pedestrians and 53% involved occupants of vehicles. 23% of all pedistrain fatalities involved children below the age of 16 years. The major cause of road accidents in Ghana is due to over speeding. This accounts for 60% of car crashes in the country. https://www.ghanaweb.com/GhanaHomePage/NewsArchive/Road-accidents-696-die-in-2019-first-quarter-747721

== Collaborating agencies ==
The NRSC collaborates various state agencies to ensure road safety. They include:

- Motor Transport and Traffic Unit
- Driver and Vehicle Licensing Authority
- Building and Road Research Institute
- Ghana Highways Authority
- Department of Feeder Roads
- Department of Urban Roads

== Funding ==
Funding for the commission's operations are from the Government of Ghana, donor agencies and philanthropists. The commission uses funds it receives to expand and implement new road safety programmes. The Danish International Development Assistance (Danida) is a major funder of government road safety activities in Ghana.
