= Technical University of Applied Sciences Wildau =

Coordinates: 52°19′10″N 13°37′57″E

Technische Hochschule Wildau
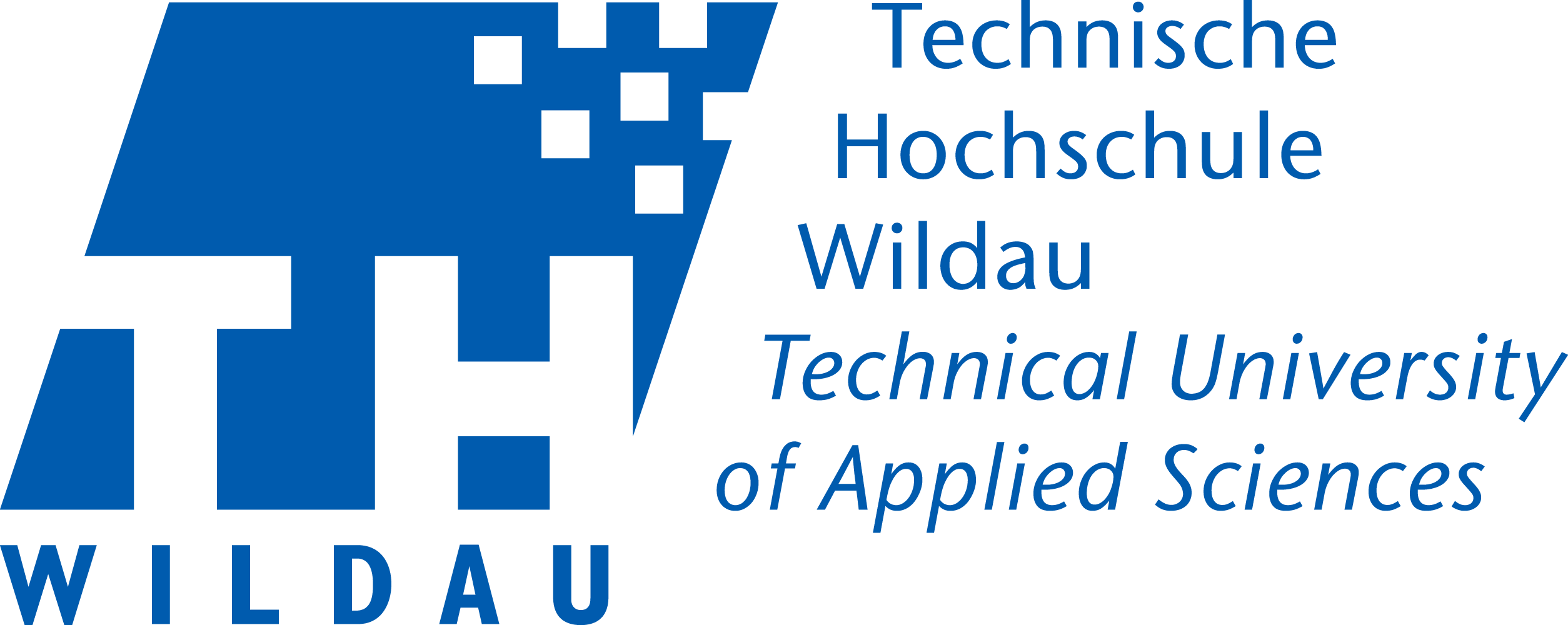

Location
- Hochschulring 1, 15745 Wildau; Brandenburg; Germany

Information
- Type: Public
- Founded: October 22, 1991
- President: Prof. Dr. Ulrike Tippe
- Teaching staff: over 100 professors
- Employees: over 350 employees
- Enrollment: 3,646 WS 2018/19
- International students: 627 (2018/19)
- Website: https://en.th-wildau.de

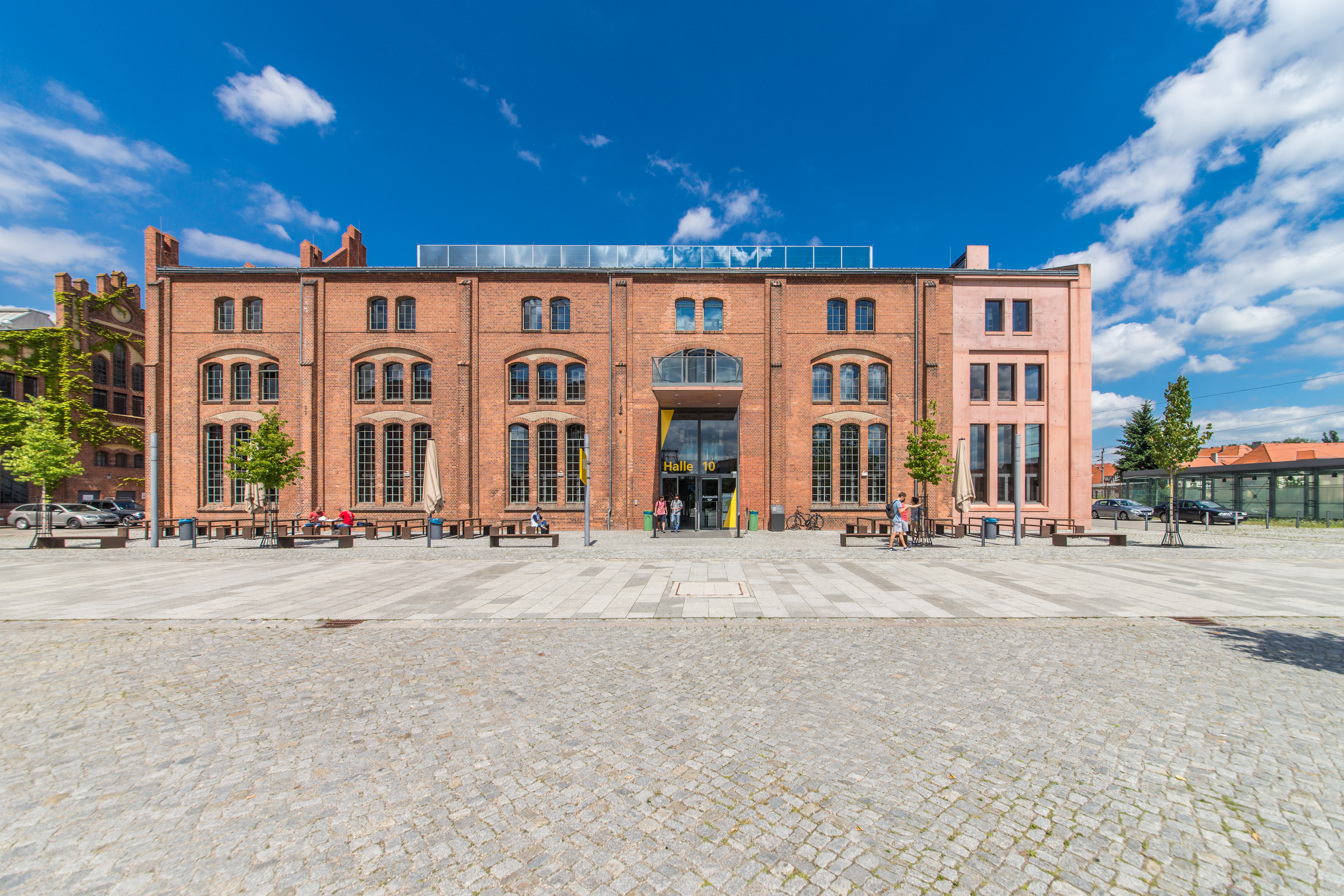
Hall 10, including cafeteria and library

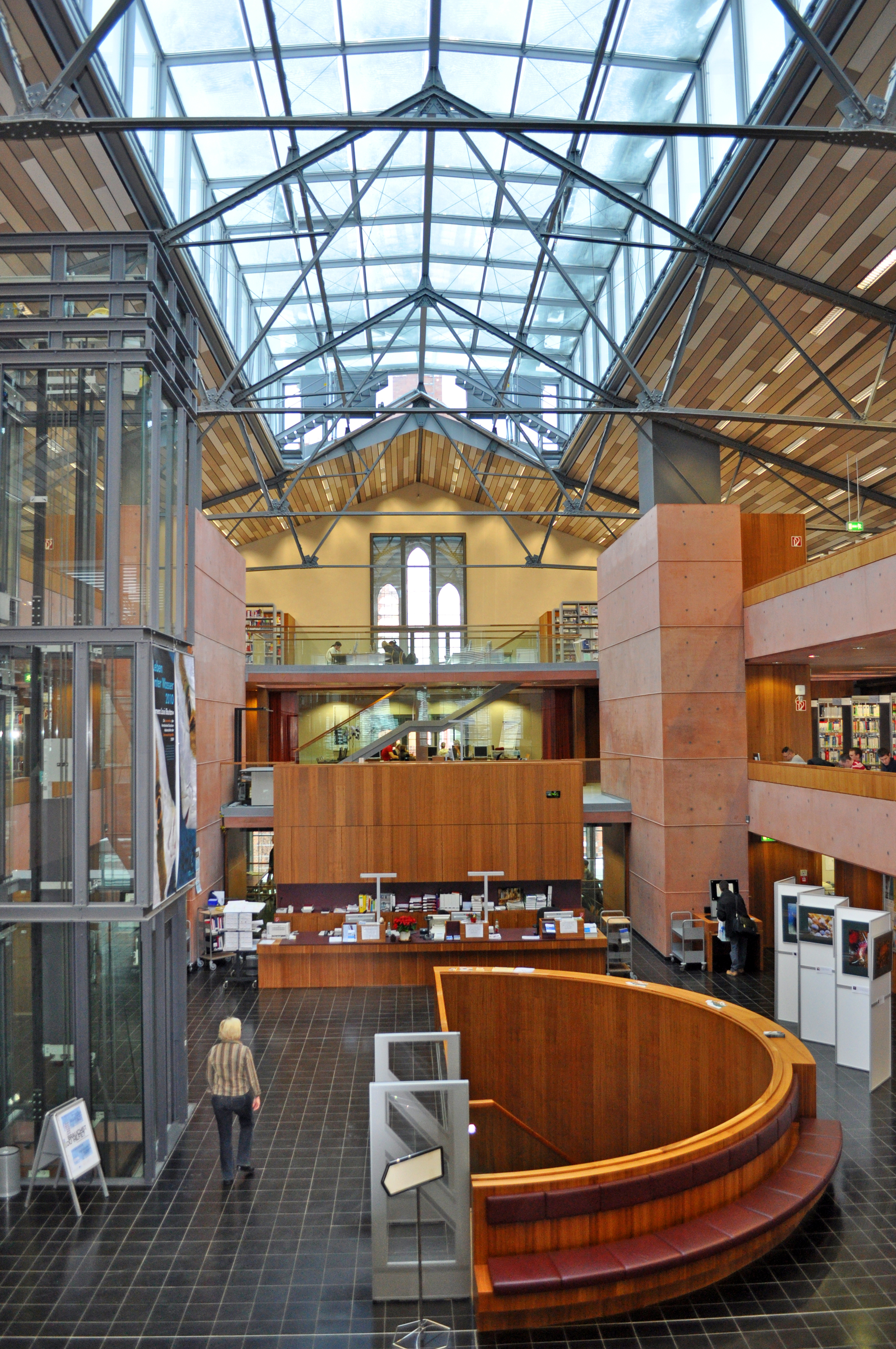
TH Wildau Library

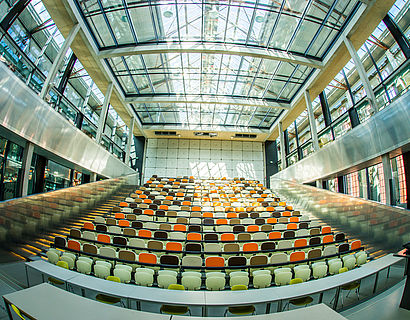
Large Auditorium Hall in Hall 14

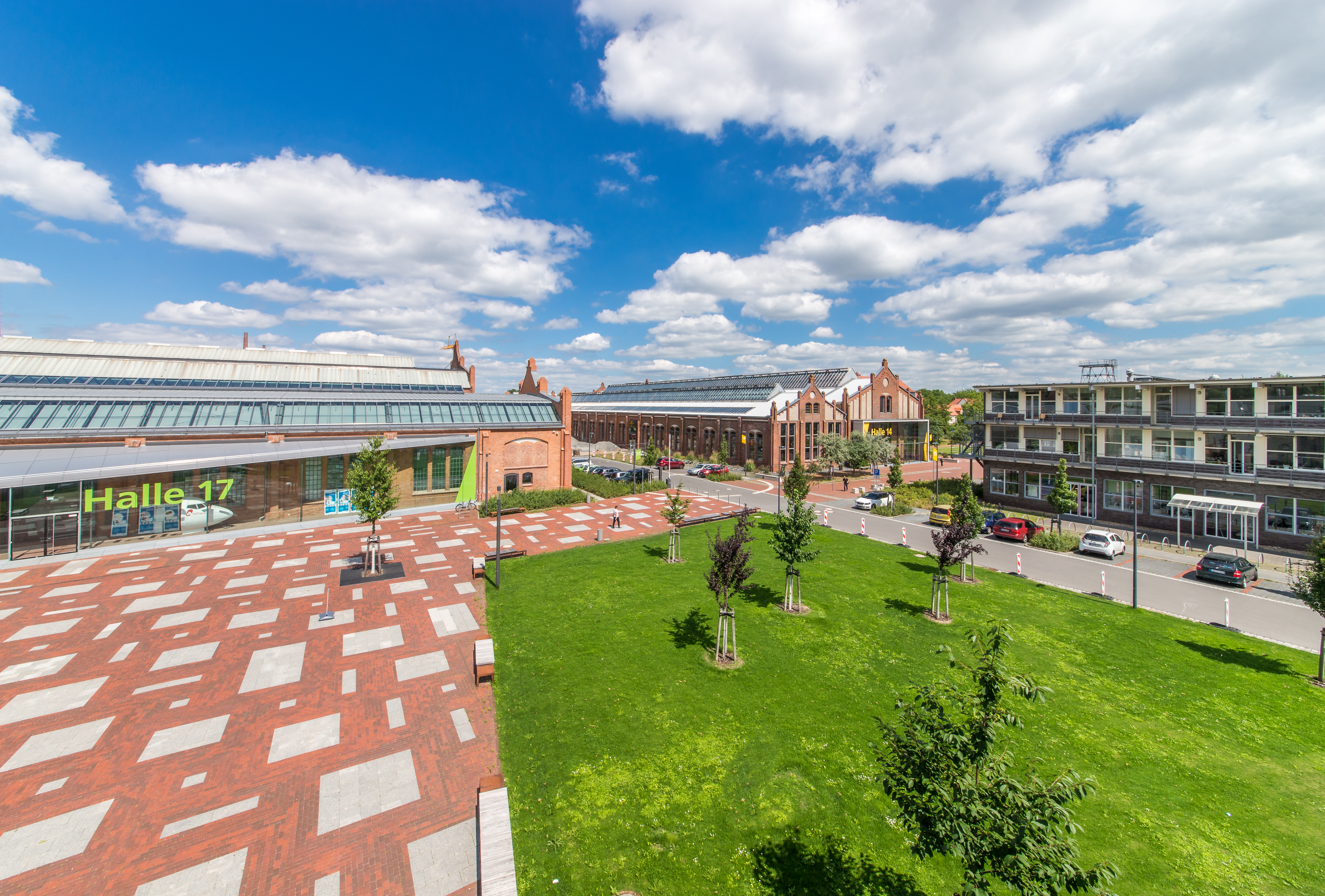
Hall 17 and Campus

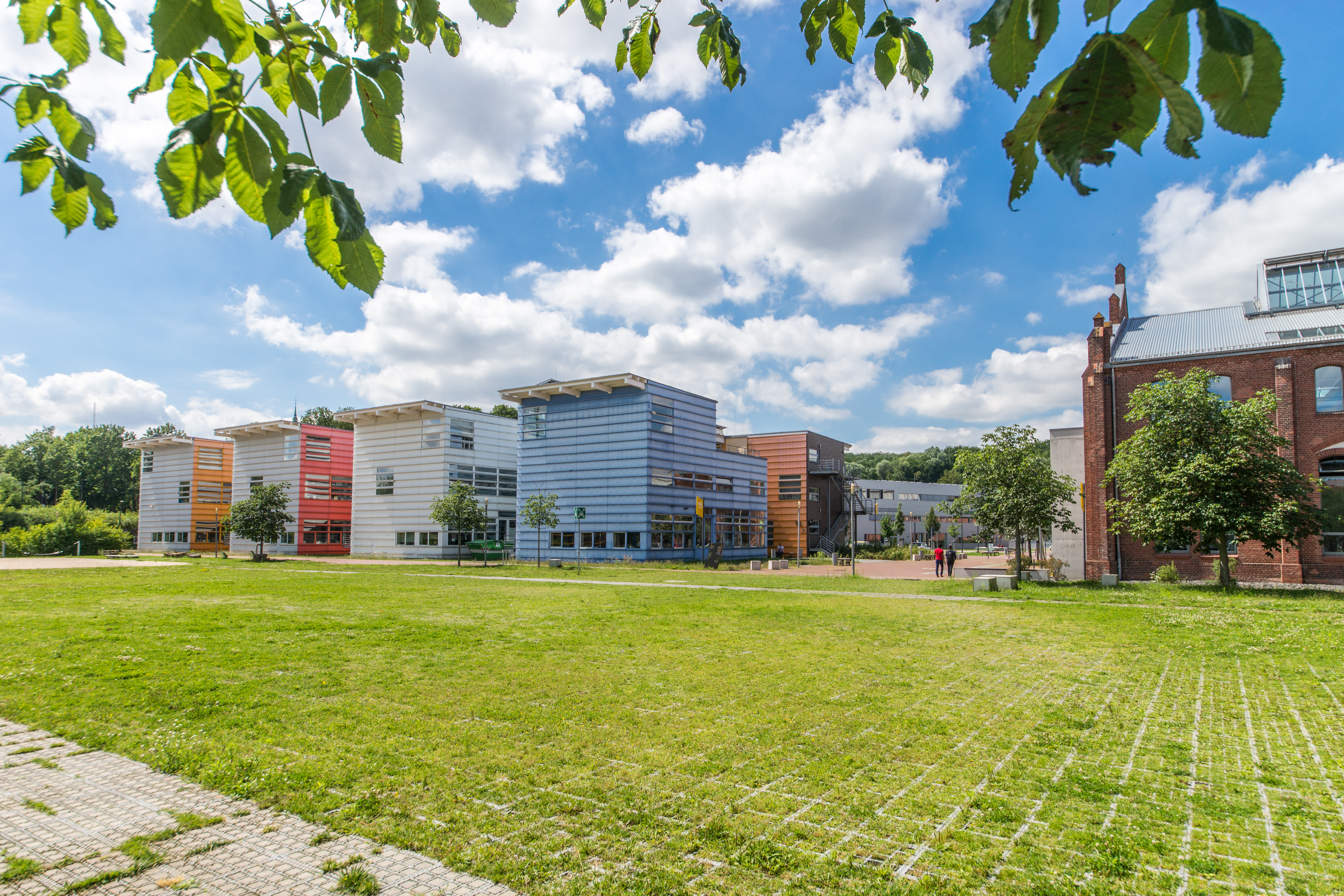
House 15 and surroundings

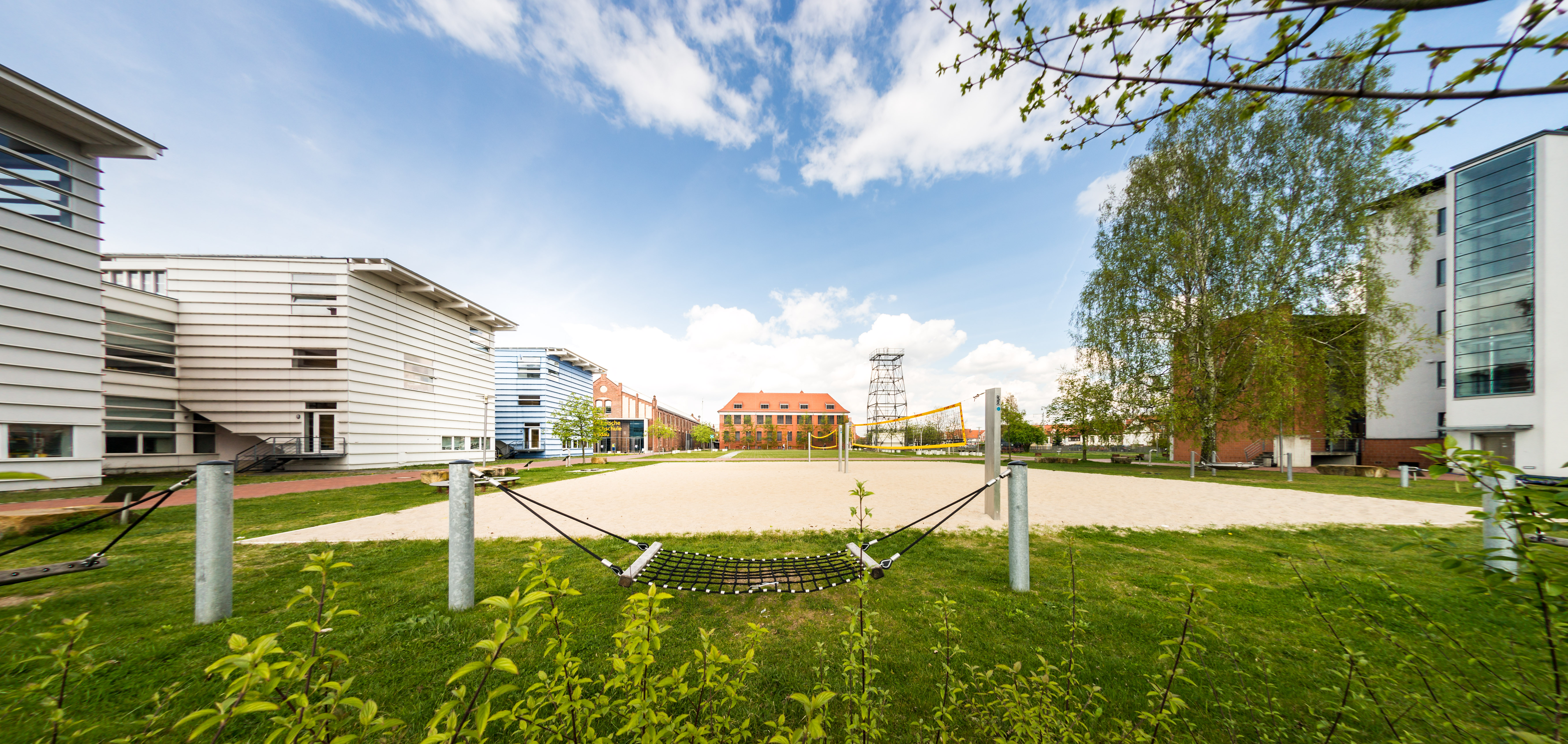
Volleyball on campus

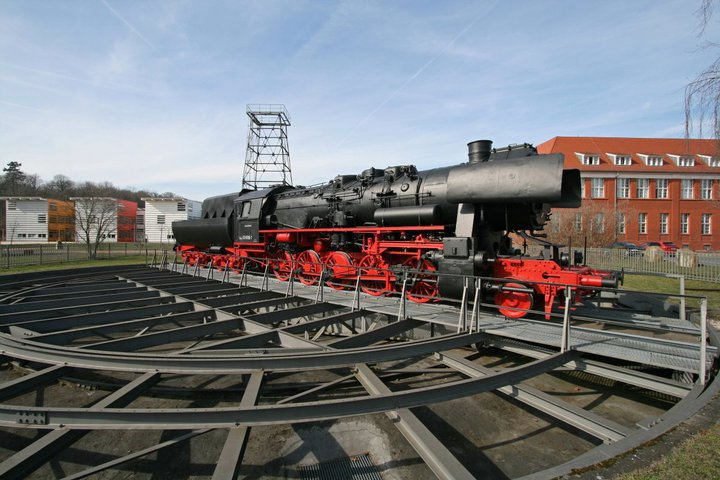
Locomotive on campus, reminiscent of Wildau's history as an important locomotive factory

The Technical University of Applied Sciences Wildau ('UAS Wildau' for short) is the largest of five universities of applied sciences in the federal state of Brandenburg, Germany. TH Wildau was founded as a technical university of applied sciences in 1991, but its connection to engineering education dates back further to the late 1940s. Today it sits on a modern and compact campus in Wildau, with direct train access to Berlin.

== History ==
=== 1949-1955: Engineering Education Begins ===
In mid-September 1949 the 'Vocational School of Locomotive and Wagon Construction' was founded and specialist engineering education in Wildau officially began. Engineering studies began with a group of just 5 students. Initially, the prescribed period of study was set to be “not significantly more than two years”.

In September 1953 the school was renamed “Technical School of Heavy Machinery Construction” and was assigned to the Ministry of Heavy Machinery Construction. Two years later, it was renamed again, this time as “Engineering School for Heavy Machinery” (ISW). Master engineers were trained, initially in evening classes, but in distance learning courses as well.

=== 1956-1991: Skilled Engineering Professionals ===
The scope and focus of the school grew more general over the years. In 1964 it was renamed "The Engineering School of Mechanical Engineering Wildau" to reflect this. On account of being assigned, in the 1970s, to the GDR's Ministry of Tool and Processing Machinery Construction, Wildau had access to various tools at an early stage. In fact, one of the first computer systems of the GDR, type ZRA 1, was installed in Wildau.

During the 1980s, further courses of study for technicians were initiated and other courses were expanded. A new building on Friedrich-Engels-Strasse, with a large auditorium, began construction as well.

=== 1991: Founding of the University of Applied Sciences Wildau ===
The end of the GDR and the reunification of Germany brought immense changes. In October 1991 the federal state of Brandenburg founded the University of Applied Sciences Wildau. Other Universities of Applied Sciences throughout Brandenburg - in Lausitz, Potsdam, Brandenburg, and Eberswalde, for instance, were founded at the same time under the same Decree.

== Location ==
=== Proximity to Berlin ===
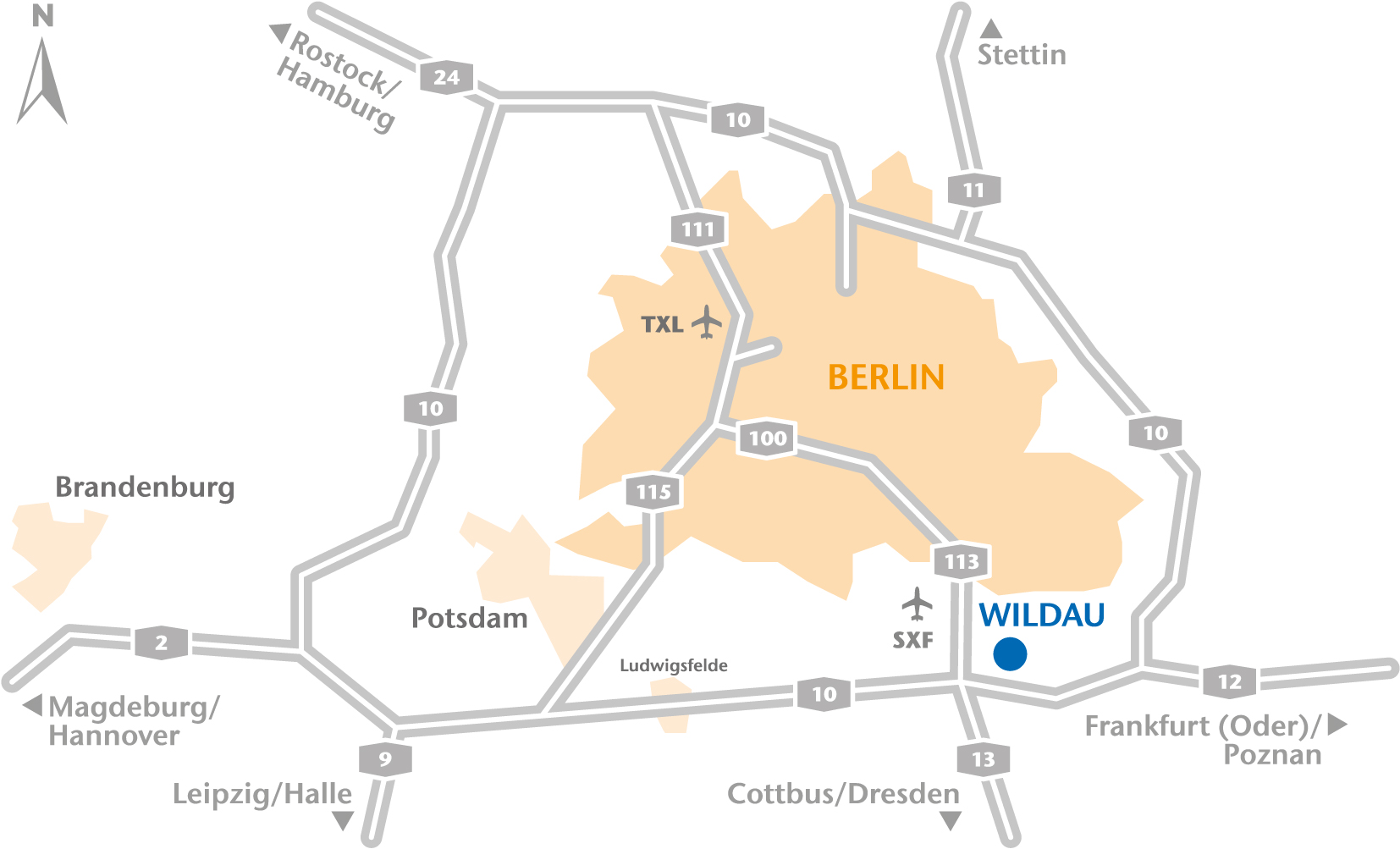
Location of TH Wildau, south of Berlin

TH Wildau is a campus university located just south of Berlin. The campus can be reached directly using the S-Bahn line 46 (direction Königs Wusterhausen) to the Wildau S-Bahn station. The university is located directly in front of the station.

With the bus lines 736, 737, and 738, the university can also be reached directly. The regional train line RE2 (direction Cottbus Hauptbahnhof) as well as the line RB24 (direction Senftenberg) allow for further accessibility of the university from Berlin with a change in Königs Wusterhausen.

By car you can reach the university via the Bundesautobahn 10 (Berliner Ring) via the exit Königs Wusterhausen as well as via Federal Highway (Bundesstraße) 179.

=== Regional Growth Centre ===
TH Wildau is also part of one of Brandenburg's fastest growing regional growth centres ('regionale Wachstumskerne'), dubbed the Schönefeld Cross ('Schönefelder Kreuz'). It consists of the cities of Königs Wusterhausen and Wildau, along with the municipality of Schönefeld. It encompasses the new Berlin-Brandenburg airport region, which will become quite active once Willy Brandt Berlin-Brandenburg airport (BER) opens in October 2020 (if current estimates of the start of operations are accurate).

The university also borders (to the North) the town of Zeuthen, which is home to the second campus of the German Electron Synchrotron ('DESY'), part of the Institute of High Energy Physics. DESY is a national research center that operates particle accelerators and investigates the structure of matter.

In an adjacent district of Brandenburg (to the East) lies the district of Oder-Spree, which will be the home of Tesla's recently announced Gigafactory, its first in Europe.

== Degree programmes ==
The Technical University of Applied Sciences Wildau has 15 Bachelor's programmes and 15 Master's programmes. Alongside the traditional engineering disciplines, the range of degrees at the university includes courses in natural sciences, engineering, economics, law, business administration and management. TH Wildau is the only university in Brandenburg to offer Logistics, and the first university in the whole of Germany with a degree in Telematics. It is also the first University of Applied Sciences in Germany with a degree in Biosystems Technology/ Bioinformatics.

Students can earn internationally recognized academic degrees such as master's and bachelor's degree (according to the Bologna Process).

Students can pursue Master's programmes in English at the university's graduate school, the Wildau Institute of Technology

Faculty of Engineering and Natural Sciences
Course of Study	Degree	Type of Study	Instructional Language
Automation Technology (B.Eng.)	Bachelor's	Direct	German
Automation Technology (B.Eng.)	Bachelor's	Dual (Integrated Training)	German
Aviation Engineering / Aviation Logistics (B.Eng)	Bachelor's	Direct	German
Aviation Engineering / Aviation Logistics (B.Eng)	Bachelor's	Dual (Integrated Training)	German
Aviation Engineering / Aviation Management (B.Eng)	Bachelor's	Direct	German
Aviation Engineering / Aviation Management (B.Eng)	Bachelor's	Dual (Integrated Training)	German
Biosystems Technology / Bioinformatics (B.Sc.)	Bachelor's	Direct	German
Industrial Engineering (B.Eng.)	Bachelor's	Direct	German
Industrial Engineering (B.Eng.)	Bachelor's	Dual (Integrated Training)	German
Industrial Engineering (B.Eng.)	Bachelor's	Distance	German
Logistics (B.Eng.)	Bachelor's	Direct	German
Logistics (B.Eng.)	Bachelor's	Dual (Integrated Training)	German
Mechanical Engineering (B.Eng.)	Bachelor's	Direct	German
Mechanical Engineering (B.Eng.)	Bachelor's	Dual (Integrated Training)	German
Physical Technologies / Energy Systems (B.Eng.)	Bachelor's	Direct	German
Physical Technologies / Energy Systems (B.Eng.)	Bachelor's	Dual (Integrated Training)	German
Telematics (B.Eng.)	Bachelor's	Dual (Integrated Work Experience)	German
Transportation System Engineering (B.Eng.)	Bachelor's	Direct	German
Transportation System Engineering (B.Eng.)	Bachelor's	Dual (Integrated Training)	German
Automated Energy Systems (M.Eng)	Master's	Direct	German
Aviation Engineering / Aviation Logistics (M.Eng.)	Master's	Direct	German
Aviation Engineering / Aviation Management (M.Eng.)	Master's	Direct	German
Aviation Management (AVIMA)	Master's	Extra-Occupational	English
Biosystems Technology / Bioinformatics (M.Sc.)	Master's	Direct	German
Logistics and Supply Chain Management (M.Eng.)	Master's	Direct	German
Mechanical Engineering (M.Eng)	Master's	Direct	German
Photonics (M.Eng.)	Master's	Direct	German
Technical Management (M.Eng)	Master's	Direct	English
Telematics (M.Eng)	Master's	Direct	German

Faculty of Business, Computing, and Law
Course of Study	Degree	Type of Study	Instructional Language
Business Administration (B.A.)	Bachelor's	Direct	German
Business Administration (B.A.)	Bachelor's	Distance	German
Business and Law (LL.B.)	Bachelor's	Direct	German
Business Computing (B.Sc.)	Bachelor's	Direct	German
European Management (B.A.)	Bachelor's	Direct	German/English
European Business Management (B.A.)	Bachelor's	Direct	English
Public Administration in Brandenburg (LL.B.)	Bachelor's	Dual (Integrated Training)	German
Public Administration Informatics in Brandenburg (B.Sc.)	Bachelor's	Dual (Integrated Training)	German
Business and Law (LL.M.)	Master's	Direct	German
Business Computing (M.Sc.)	Master's	Direct	German
Business Management (M.A.)	Master's	Direct	German
European Management (M.A.)	Master's	Direct	English
Business Administration (MBA)	Master's	Extra-Occupational	German
Library Computer Sciences (M.Sc.)	Master's	Extra-Occupational	German

== Research & Development ==
TH Wildau has a strong research focus. In comparison to other small universities of applied sciences, it has done exceptionally well in obtaining third-party research funding. Over 203,000 EUR was raised in third-party funding for each professor in 2015; in 2017, the university raised 11 million EUR - two thirds of its budget.

TH Wildau stands out in three key areas of research, which have been publicised on the research map of the conference of vice chancellors:

- Applied life sciences
- Informatics/telematics
- Optical technologies/photonics

The university further specialises in the research fields of production and materials, transport and logistics as well as management and law.

TH Wildau is also home to two research institutes: the Institute of Life Sciences and Biomedical Technologies and the Institute for Materials, Development and Production.

== International Partnerships ==
Since its foundation in 1991, TH Wildau has cooperated with more than 150 universities in over 60 countries across the world.

TH Wildau currently awards double degrees with partner institutions from China, France, Georgia, Italy, Kazakhstan, Russia, and Spain. It has also established a trilateral Joint Degree program in Logistics and Supply Chain Management together with Universitat Autonoma de Barcelona in Spain and Riga Technical University in Latvia.

TH Wildau also currently has about 70 active partnerships with international partner universities around the world. Many of these cooperations include arrangements for student and/or staff exchange.

A list of current partnerships can be found below:

Partner Institution	City	Country	Faculty/Subject	Type of Cooperation	Year Established
The University of Newcastle	Newcastle	Australia	Open	Study Abroad/Outgoing (Application via IEC Online Berlin)	2006
Western Sydney University	Sydney	Australia	Open	Study Abroad/Outgoing (Application via IEC Online Berlin)	2017
FH Salzburg - University of Applied Sciences Salzburg	Puch	Austria	Information and Communication Technologies	Student Exchange (Outgoing, Incoming), Staff Exchange	2014
FH Campus Wien - University of Applied Sciences Vienna	Vienna	Austria	Manufacturing and Processing	Student Exchange (Outgoing, Incoming), Staff Exchange	2018
VIVES University of Applied Sciences	Bruges/Kortrijk	Belgium	Business and Administration, Engineering	Student Exchange (Outgoing, Incoming), Staff Exchange	2011
FAE Centro Universitário	Curitiba	Brazil	Business and Administration	Student Exchange (Outgoing, Incoming)	2011
Universidade do Estado de Santa Catarina	Florianópolis	Brazil	Business and Administration	Student Exchange (Outgoing, Incoming)	2010
Centro Paula Souza	São Paulo	Brazil	Automation Technology	Student Exchange (Outgoing, Incoming)	2018
“Angel Kanchev” University of Rousse	Rousse	Bulgaria	Management and Administration	Student Exchange (Outgoing, Incoming), Staff Exchange	2014
University of Chemical Technology and Metallurgy.	Sofia	Bulgaria	Chemistry, Engineering	Student Exchange (Outgoing, Incoming), Staff Exchange, Assistance for PhD Students	2001
British Columbia Institute of Technology Burnaby	Burnaby	Canada	Business and Media Studies	Study Abroad/Outgoing (Application via IEC Online Berlin)	2018
Shanghai Jian Qiao University	Shanghai	China	European Management (Double Degree, Only Incoming), Business and Management, Law	Student Exchange (Outgoing, Incoming), Guest lectures	2017
Shanghai University of Political Science and Law	Shanghai	China	Law	Student Exchange (Outgoing, Incoming)	2019
Polytechnic of Rijeka	Rijeka	Croatia	Logistics, Telematics	Student Exchange (Incoming), Staff Exchange	2005
Universidad Tecnológica de la Habana José Antonio Echeverría	Havana	Cuba	Logistics	Joint Intensive Programmes, Guest Lectures	2017
Technical University of Liberec	Liberec	Czech Republic	Business and Administration	Student Exchange (Outgoing, Incoming), Staff Exchange	2006
Silesian University in Opava	Opava	Czech Republic	Business and Administration	Student Exchange (Outgoing, Incoming), Staff Exchange, Joint Workshops	2015
Aalborg Universitet	Aalborg	Denmark	Sustainable Energy Planning and Management	Only Lecturers‘ Exchange Possible	2002
Karelia University of Applied Sciences	Joensuu	Finland	Business and Administration	Student Exchange (Outgoing, Incoming), Staff Exchange	2002
Université Clermont Auvergne	Clermont-Ferrand	France	Business and Administration	Student Exchange (Outgoing, Incoming), Staff Exchange	2019
Université de Lille	Lille	France	Business and Administration, European Management (Double degree), Engineering	Student Exchange (Outgoing, Incoming), Staff Exchange	2008
Institut d’Optique	Palaiseau	France	Physics (Optics), Photonics	Student Exchange (Outgoing, Incoming), Staff Exchange	2017
Université Jean Monnet	Saint-Étienne	France	Business and Administration, Telematics	Student Exchange (Outgoing, Incoming), Staff Exchange, Workshops	2012
Georgian Technical University	Tbilisi	Georgia	Logistics (Double Degree, Only Incoming)	DAAD Transnational Education Project, Student Exchange (Outgoing, Incoming), Staff Exchange	2012
New Vision University	Tbilisi	Georgia	Law	Student Exchange (Outgoing, Incoming), Staff Exchange, Guest lectures	2018
Óbuda University	Budapest	Hungary	Business and Administration, Engineering, Information and Communication Technologies, Logistics	Student Exchange (Outgoing, Incoming), Staff Exchange, Joint Workshops and Projects	1995
Eszterházy Károly University	Eger	Hungary	Business and Administration	Student Exchange (Outgoing, Incoming), Staff Exchange	2013
Bifröst University	Bifröst	Iceland	Business and Administration	Student Exchange (Outgoing, Incoming), Staff Exchange	2018
Vel Tech Rangarajan Dr. Sagunthala R&D Institute of Science and Technology	Chennai	India	(Open)	Student Exchange (Outgoing, Incoming)	2019
Technological University Dublin, Blanchardstown	Dublin	Ireland	Business and Administration	Student Exchange (Outgoing, Incoming)	2000
Università degli Studi di Roma “Tor Vergata"	Rome	Italy	Photonics (Double Degree), Engineering, Material Science, Law	Student Exchange (Outgoing, Incoming), Staff Exchange, Assistance for PhD Students (Engineering)	2007
Tokyo University of Technology, Hachioji	Tokyo	Japan	Bioscience and Biotechnology	Student Exchange (Assistance for Project and Degree Theses)	2014
German-Jordanian University	Amman	Jordan	Engineering, Business and Administration	Student Exchange (Outgoing, Incoming)	2019
Kazakh-German University	Almaty	Kazakhstan	Logistics, Telematics (Double Degrees, Only Incoming)	Summer Schools (Outgoing), Guest Lectures	2008
Dedan Kimathi University of Technology	Nyeri	Kenya	Mechanical Engineering (Double degree), Molecular Biology	Student Exchange (Outgoing, Incoming), Joint Projects	2013
Technische Universität Riga	Riga	Latvia	Engineering, Logistics (Joint master's degree Logistics and Supply Chain Management)	Student Exchange (Outgoing, Incoming), Staff Exchange	2011
Šiauliai State College	Šiauliai	Lithuania	Library Science	Student Exchange (Outgoing, Incoming), Staff Exchange	2012
Mykolas Romeris University	Vilnius	Lithuania	Business and Administration, Law	Student Exchange (Outgoing, Incoming), Staff Exchange	2006
HAN University of Applied Sciences, Arnhem Business School	Arnhem	Netherlands	Business and Administration	Student Exchange (Outgoing, Incoming), Staff Exchange	1995
Avans University of Applied Sciences	Breda	Netherlands	Business and Administration	Student Exchange (Outgoing, Incoming), Staff Exchange	2015
Windesheim University of Applied Sciences	Zwolle	Netherlands	Engineering, Information and Communication Technologies	Student Exchange (Outgoing, Incoming), Staff Exchange	2013
Gdańsk School of Banking	Gdańsk	Poland	Business and Administration	Student Exchange (Outgoing, Incoming), Staff Exchange	2008
Jacob of Paradies University	Gorzów	Poland	Information and Communication Technologies, Business and Administration, Foreign Languages	Student Exchange (Outgoing, Incoming), Staff Exchange, Joint Workshops (European Management)	1997
University of Economics	Katowice	Poland	Business and Administration	Student Exchange (Outgoing, Incoming), Staff Exchange	2009
Łódź University of Technology	Łódź	Poland	Biological and Related Sciences, Engineering	Student Exchange (Outgoing, Incoming), Staff Exchange	2016
Poznań School of Banking	Poznań	Poland	Business and Administration	Student Exchange (Outgoing, Incoming), Staff Exchange	2014
Poznań School of Logistics	Poznań	Poland	Business and Administration, Logistics	Student Exchange (Outgoing, Incoming), Staff Exchange	2004
Poznań University of Technology	Poznań	Poland	Management Science, Physics, Transport and Traffic Studies/Logistics, Mechanical Engineering	Student Exchange (Outgoing, Incoming), Staff Exchange, Joint Workshops (European Management)	1994
Instituto Politécnico de Bragança	Bragança	Portugal	Business and Administration, Engineering, Biotechnology	Student Exchange (Outgoing, Incoming), Staff Exchange	2005
Povolzhsky Institute of Management Named After P.A. Stolypin	Saratov	Russia	Public Administration	Interns Exchange, Joint Projects	2012
Peter the Great St. Petersburg Polytechnic University	St. Petersburg	Russia	European Management, Industrial Engineering (Double degrees, only Incomings), Business and Management	Student Exchange (Outgoing, Incoming), Guest lectures	2001
Yaroslavl State University	Yaroslavl	Russia	Business Informatics (Double degree only Incomings)	Student Exchange (Incoming), Guest lectures	1995
Ural State University of Railway Transport	Yekaterinburg	Russia	Logistics	Joint Intensive Programmes, Guest Lectures	2012
Technical University of Košice	Košice	Slovakia	Engineering	Student Exchange (Outgoing, Incoming), Staff Exchange, Assistance for PhD Students	1997
Universitat Politècnica de Valencia, Campus D'Alcoi	Alcoy	Spain	Business and Administration, Informatics	Student Exchange (Outgoing, Incoming), Staff Exchange	2015
Universitat Autónoma de Barcelona	Barcelona	Spain	Engineering, Logistics (Joint master's degree Logistics and Supply Chain Management)	Student Exchange (Outgoing, Incoming), Staff Exchange	2012
Universitat Politècnica de Catalunya, Euncet Business School	Barcelona	Spain	Business and Administration	Student Exchange (Outgoing, Incoming), Staff Exchange	2014
Universitat Politècnica de Catalunya, Terrassa School of Engineering	Barcelona (Terrassa)	Spain	Engineering, Mechanical Engineering	Student Exchange (Outgoing, Incoming), Staff Exchange	2013
Universidad de Córdoba	Córdoba	Spain	European Management (Double degree), Business and Administration	Student Exchange (Outgoing, Incoming), Staff Exchange	2014
University of Borås	Borås	Sweden	Business and Administration	Student Exchange (Outgoing, Incoming)	2014
Işık University	Istanbul	Turkey	Business and Administration, Engineering	Student Exchange (Outgoing, Incoming), Staff Exchange	2016
Muğla Sıtkı Koçman University	Muğla	Turkey	Renewable Energies, Physical Technology	Student Exchange (Outgoing, Incoming), Staff Exchange	2005
V.E. Lashkaryov Institute of Semiconductor Physics, National Academy of Sciences of Ukraine	Kyiv	Ukraine	Photonics	Research, Assistance for PhD Students	2009
Higher Colleges of Technology Abu Dhabi	Abu Dhabi	United Arab Emirates	Logistics	Guest lectures	2010
University of the West of Scotland Paisley	Paisley	United Kingdom	Engineering, Mechanical Engineering	Student Exchange (Outgoing, Incoming), Staff Exchange	2005
DePaul University	Chicago, IL	USA	Business Informatics, IT Security	Joint Projects, Research	2018
Clark University	Worcester, MA	USA	Business Informatics, IT Security	Joint Projects, Research	2018
