= African Youth Brigade =

Ghanaian youth organization

The African Youth Brigade (abbreviated AYB) was a youth organization in Ghana. It was active in the 1980s. The AYB emerged from a split from the African Youth Command. The membership of AYB was mainly based amongst secondary school students in the Volta, Brong Ahafo and Greater Accra regions. AYB was one of the more moderate groupings supporting the PNDC.

Kwabla Davour was the national secretary of the organization and Dr. M.M. Owusu-Ansah is patron.
