= Wildau Institute of Technology =

Higher education institute in Wildau, Germany

Coordinates: 52.3190°N 13.6325°E

UAS Wildau

The Wildau Institute of Technology (WIT) is an institute of further education at higher university level. The WIT is affiliated to the Technical University of Applied Sciences Wildau (TH Wildau - Technische Hochschule Wildau (FH)), and was established in 2004.

== Study programmes ==
- Master of Business Administration (two years, part-time, 25% English, 75% German, accredited by ACQUIN)
- Master in Aviation Management (two years, part-time, English, accredited by ACQUIN)
- Master in Bibliotheksinformatik (two years, part-time, German)

== Related fields ==
- List of universities in Germany
- Dahme-Spreewald
