= Fair Wages and Salaries Commission =

Fair Wages and Salaries Commission, Ghana
- FWSC

Agency overview
- Formed: 2007
- Jurisdiction: Republic of Ghana
- Headquarters: Ministries, Accra
- Parent agency: Ministry of Employment and Labour Relations
- Website: www.fairwages.gov.gh

Established by the government of Ghana under the FWSC ACT, 2007 (Act 737), the Fair Wages and Salaries Commission has the mandate of implementing the new Government Pay Policy (i.e. Single Spine Pay Policy) as regard salaries, wages, grading and classification of public service workers.

Prior to its establishment, the government of Ghana has had to grapple with the challenge of properly managing salaries and other germane labor concerns of public service workers. A situation that leads to rampant strike actions at the labor front. The Single Spine Salary Structure was thus introduced with the objective of migrating all government workers to a single pay platform for proper administration with the Fair Wages and Salaries Commission given the mandate. As at 2011, available data indicates that the commission has migrated about 98 percent of all government workers unto the Single Spine Salary Structure.

Despite this, the Commission may not have been able to fully live up to its mandate as labor agitations within the public sector continues to rise. To be able to resolve some of these concerns, the commission in recent times recommended to government the setting up of an independent emolument commission to streamline salary administration in the country.

In April 2025, President John Mahama reapointe Dr George Smith-Graham as Chief Executive Officer of the FWSC, returning him to the role he had first held as the Commission's inaugrural CEO from 2009 to 2017

== Mission ==
The Commission exists to ensure that best practices in job grading, evaluation, performance management and research are employed in pay administration to ensure that pay in the Public services is linked to productivity and that high-caliber employees are attracted to and retained within the public service.

== Vision ==
To become a world class reference center in Pay Administration, promoting Fairness, Equity and Transparency in Public Services Compensation and Benefits.

== Transition to the Independent Emoluments Commision ==
In April 2025, President John Mahama reapointe Dr George Smith-Graham as Chief Executive Officer of the FWSC, returning him to the role he had first held as the Commission's inaugrural CEO from 2009 to 2017, where he succeeded Benjamin Arthur, who had led the Commission since January 2022.

Under Smith-Graham, the FWSC has been overseeing the Commission's planned transformation into an Independent Emoluments Commission(IEC), a proposed fully independent body intended to remove political interference from public-sector pay-setting, which the FWSC has idntified as a persistent flaw in the Single Spine Salary Structure introduced in 2010.

As of July 2026, a preliminary draft of the legal instrument establishing the IEC was undergoing internal review, with the enabling bill targeted for passage by Parliament around October 2026 following consiltations with the judiciary, executive, legislature, organised labour,and state-owned enterprises.

The FWSC has projected the functioning IEC, together with a new National Emoluments Policy linking pay to productivity, could reduce public-sector strike actions by 90 percent or more.

== Some mediated Labour Impasse ==
- University Teachers Association of Ghana (UTAG) and Colleges of Education Teachers Association of Ghana (CETAG) strike over better conditions of service
- Civil and Local Government Staff Association of Ghana strike over conditions of service
- Doctors strike over better conditions of service
