= Youth Employment Network =

Youth Employment Network (YEN) is a joint UN, World Bank and ILO initiative to address the global challenge of youth employment.

UN Secretary General Kofi Annan committed to set up YEN as a personal initiative, he invited Juan Somavia, Director-General of the International Labour Organization (ILO) and James Wolfensohn, former President of the World Bank to join him in this new inter-agency partnership.
