= Student Loan Trust =

Government of Ghana agency

The Student Loan Trust is a statutory agency of the Government of Ghana established in December 2005 under the Trustee Incorporation Act 1962, Act 106. The Trust was set up to provide financial resources to students and to help promote and facilitate the national ideals stipulated by the Constitution of Ghana [1]. Student loans can be found in any of the tertiary institutions in the country.

Mission and Vision

Mission

Is to provide Ghanaian tertiary students with financial support that is timely, accessible, affordable, and innovative.

Vision

Make sure tertiary students access quality education.

The Student Loans Trust Fund is governed by a Board of Trustees that comprises distinguished individuals of relevant backgrounds relevant to the business of SLTF. The members of the board are appointed by the President of the Republic. .

The current CEO of the Student Loans Trust Fund is Dr. Saajida Shiraz

Loan Application Requirements

Before an applicant applies for the loan, a student will require the following in order to successfully apply.

- You must be a Ghanaian and have offered admission to study an accredited tertiary program in Ghana.
- You must be pursuing a tertiary program such as a diploma or 1st degree and have a student ID card or admission letter.
- You must have a valid Ghana Card from the NIA
- You must have an active registered mobile phone number and a valid email address. Until these are provided, the application will not be successful.
