= West Africa Food System Resilience Programme =

West Africa Food System Resilience Programme (FSRP Ghana)
- Abbreviation: FSRP, Ghana
- Formation: 7 December 2023 (2 years ago)
- Type: Intergovernmental Organization, Food Security
- Legal status: Active
- Parent organization: ECOWAS, Government of Ghana
- Employees: (2023)
- Website: fsrp.org.gh
- FSRP Ghana website

The West Africa Food System Resilience Programme (FSRP) is a World Bank funded program, promoted by ECOWAS for participating countries. It is to strengthen food system risk management, improve the sustainability of the agricultural productive base and harmonize agricultural markets in the West African sub region. Participating countries as of December 2024 are Burkina Faso, Mali, Niger, Chad, Sierra Leone, Togo and Chad. In Ghana, FSRP which is being implemented by Ghana’s Ministry of Food and Agriculture (MOFA), is focusing on the intensified production, marketing and consumption of wholesome rice, maize, Broiler poultry, soyabeans (for the poultry) and tomatoes.

== Background ==
The Economic Community of West African States (ECOWAS) and the World Bank Group, having identified common natural and social phenomena which impede food production and distribution in the sub region (like floods, droughts, the spread of pests, livestock diseases, pandemics and civil wars), have found it expedient to coordinate efforts among its member nations to strengthen food system risk management in the sub region. This is being carried out across the region, through the West Africa Food System Resilience Programme (FSRP). The programme’s development objective is “to increase preparedness against food insecurity and build resilience of food systems in participating countries”. Participating countries include Ghana, Togo, Burkina Faso, Mali, Niger, Chad, Sierra Leone, and Senegal.

== Program objectives ==
The main Program Development Objective (PDO) of the FSRP is to strengthen regional food system risk management, improve the sustainability of the productive base in targeted areas and to develop regional agricultural markets. The agricultural priority focus of Ghana in this program aligns with regional priorities outlined in the regional agricultural policy for West Africa with greater integration in markets in the sub-region. The specific PDOs are: (a)To establish a risk management architecture to provide early warning support to value chain actors at national and regional level. (b) To scale up dissemination, adoption and capacity building programmes focused on regional and national priority commodities. (c) To develop, expand and maintain areas under Sustainable Land and Water Management (SLWM). (d) To strengthen partnership among actors in priority value chains; and (e) To facilitate and promote regional trade in inputs and output of targeted value chains.

== FSRP Ghana ==
The Government of Ghana (GoG) through the Ministry of Food and Agriculture (MoFA) in collaboration with the Economic Community of West African States (ECOWAS) is participating in the second phase of the West Africa Food System Resilience Programme (FSRP2) under the World Bank Multi-Phase Programmatic Approach (MPA) to strengthen regional food system risk management, improve the sustainability of the productive base in targeted areas and to develop regional agricultural markets. The FSRP2 will contribute to enhancing the capacity of vulnerable households, families, communities, and food systems within the country to face uncertainty and the risk of shocks; to withstand and respond effectively to shocks; as well as to recover and adapt in a sustainable manner.

The Program includes three regional institutions: Economic Commission of West African States (ECOWAS), the Permanent Interstate Committee for Drought Control in the Sahel (CILSS), and the West and Central African Council for Agricultural Research and Development (CORAF). Phase 1 of FSRP countries include Burkina Faso, Mali, Niger, and Togo. Phase 2 countries include Chad, Ghana, and Sierra Leone. The Program is expected to end in December 2030. Ghana will implement the program for 5 years (expected end date December 2028) with a financing envelope of US$150 million. Implementation of FSRP is particularly important for Ghana’s food and nutrition security situation due to the uncertainty of the nature and severity of COVID-19 impacts across the agricultural value chain.

Ghana acknowledges the urgent need to do her part to address the unavoidable incidence and effects of climate change around the world, and indeed on their land. To that end, FSRP Ghana is rolling out a combination of adaptive, innovative and sustainable interventions to arm vulnerable households, families, farmers and communities, to withstand uncertainty and shocks in food production and distribution in the sub-region. Preparations are therefore fast advancing to construct or refurbish pivotal value chain facilities across the country, including:

Veterinary laboratories in Dorma Ahenkro and Accra

Laboratories and seed banks of the Council for Scientific & Industrial Research [CSIR] in Bunso, Kumasi and Tamale, to promote and facilitate the links between Research & Industry.

Rehabilitate warehouses, border posts and markets to build our capacity to participate in viable regional trade.

FSRP is also supporting key value chain actors of its priority commodities (Maize, Rice, Soya, Tomatoes and Poultry)

Promoting innovative and smart technologies (which are climate-smart and youth/gender-sensitive);

Conducting pest and disease surveillance.

FSRP has procured 20 automated weather stations for Ghana Meteorological Agency for the provision of agric-focused and location specific forecasts and customized climate information services to farmers.

FSRP Ghana anchors its deliverables on three [3] key pillars:

Sustainability, Ownership and Public-Private Partnership.

In October 2024, FSRP Ghana cut the sod for the commencement of works towards the completion of the rehabilitation of the Kpong Irrigation Scheme which straddles across the Lower Manya Krobo and Shai Osudoku Districts with an amount of 22.5 million dollars through World Bank funding. This is the continuation of previous investments Government of Ghana through World Bank support made in the rehabilitation and modernization of some major irrigation schemes in the country at a cost of over US$90 million between 2019 – 2021. Out of this amount, US$62 million was invested in the 1st phase of rehabilitation of Kpong Irrigation Scheme & the construction/ expansion of Kpong Left Bank Irrigation Project in the North Tongu District in the Volta Region.

The World Bank Country Director for Ghana, Liberia and Sierra Leone, Robert Taliercio O’Brien and the World Bank Vice President for Western and Central Africa, Mr. Ousmane Diagana have visited FSRP sites in Ghana to gain first-hand acquaintance with the progress of works by the FSRP Ghana Team.
