= Ghana Communication Technology University =

Public technical university in Accra, Ghana

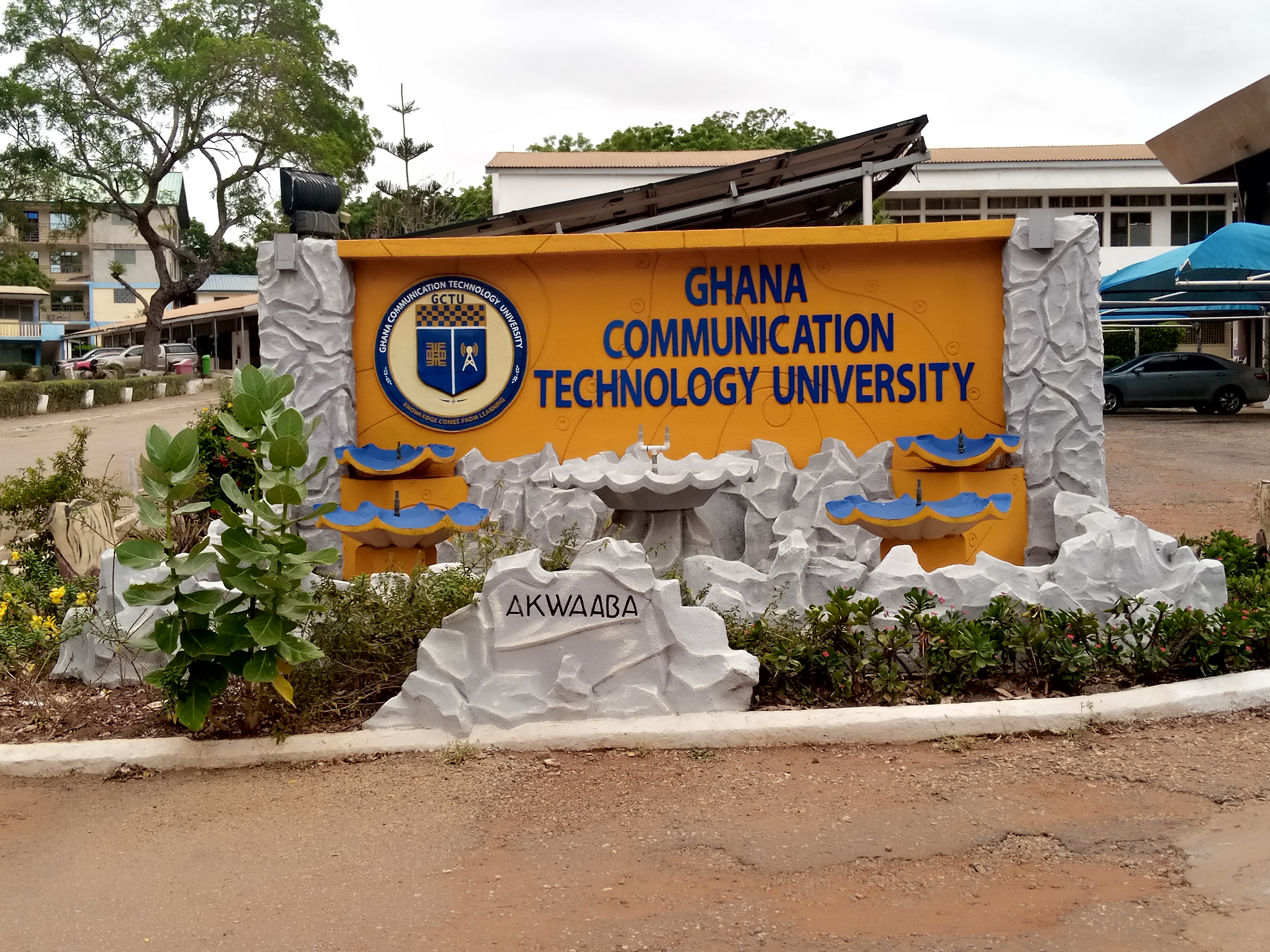
- Motto: Knowledge comes from learning
- Type: Public
- Established: 2006; 20 years ago
- Vice-Chancellor: Ag. Prof. Ebenezer Malcalm
- Students: 9000+
- Undergraduates: 6,500
- Postgraduates: 2,000
- Location: Accra, Greater Accra Region, Ghana; 5.5998°N 0.2362°W
- Website: www.gctu.edu.gh

Ghana Communication Technology University (GCTU) is a public university in Accra, Ghana founded in 2005.

The school was formerly known as Ghana Telecom University College and Ghana Technology University College . The change in name to Ghana Communication Technology University came with the passing of the Ghana Communication Technology University Bill in June 2020.

== Overview ==
The university provides bachelors degrees and graduate programs, particularly in Computing, Engineering and Information and Communications Technologies. It also offers certificate programs, with courses that provide credit for the bachelor's degree, and other professional development seminars and workshops.

Its school of Business opened in January 2009. First degrees in business include Bachelor of Science in Business and Bachelor of Science in Entrepreneurship. A Master of Science in Entrepreneurship and Technology is offered.

The school maintains partnership with Kwame Nkrumah University of Science & Technology (KNUST), Ghana; AFRALTI, Kenya; The Open University, United Kingdom; DePaul University, USA; Aalborg University, Denmark; St. Mary's College of Maryland, USA; Antioch University, USA; University of California, Santa Barbara, California; Information Communication Technology (ICU), South Korea; University of Hertfordshire, United Kingdom; Wildau Institute of Technology, Germany.

Since its first class of 350 students matriculated in 2006, GCTU has increased its enrollment to about 7,000 students in 2021.GCTU is considered to be one of the leading technology universities in Ghana and across Africa.

GCTU's main campus is located in the Tesano section of Accra, Republic of Ghana. A second campus has been opened in nearby Abeka, a nearby Accra suburb and a satellite campus at Nungua. Apart from Accra there are satellite campuses in Kumasi, Takoradi, Koforidua and Ho.

The 15-member University Council comprising distinguished educators, business executives and government officials was inaugurated on June 3, 2025.

Mr. Emmanuel Baidoo has been appointed as the new Registrar of the university, effective May 27, 2022. He takes over from Mr. Nii Adotei Abrahams, who served for two terms from August 2020 to August 2022.

== Faculties ==
The institution has 3 main faculties. These are the Faculty of Computing and Information Systems (FoCIS), Faculty of Engineering (FoE), and the Faculty of IT Business.

=== Faculty of Computing and Information Systems ===
The Faculty of Computing and Information Systems (FoCIS) includes 5 departments:

- Department of Computer Science
- Department of Information Technology
- Department of Mobile and Pervasive Computing
- Department of Information Systems
- Department of General Studies

==== Department of Computer Science ====
The Department of Computer Science was founded in the year 2017 but received its first set of students in the year 2021. Currently, these are the programs being offered by the department.

===== Programs =====
- Bachelor of Science in Computer Science
- Bachelor of Science in Computer Science (Cyber Security Option)
- Bachelor of Science in Data Science and Analytics
- Bachelor of Science in Software Engineering
- Diploma in Computer Science
- Diploma in Cyber Security
- Diploma in Data Science

The Department of Computer Science also offers postgraduate programs with the help of their School of Graduate Studies and Research. The following postgraduate programs are offered by the department.

===== Postgraduate Programs =====
- Master of Science in Computer Science
- Master of Philosophy in Computer Science
- PhD in Computer Science

==== Department of Information Technology ====
===== Programs =====
- Bachelor of Science in Information Technology
- Bachelor of Science in Networking and Systems Administration
- Diploma in Information Technology

The Department of Computer Science also offers postgraduate programs with the help of their School of Graduate Studies and Research. The following postgraduate programs are offered by the department.

===== Postgraduate Programs =====
- Master of Science in Information Technology
- PhD in Information Technology

==== Department of Mobile and Pervasive Computing ====
The Department of Mobile and Pervasive Computing offers students with the necessary skills in the field of mobile computing. Students are equip with advanced knowledge in computing. Below are the programs offered by the department.

===== Programs =====
- Bachelor of Science in Mobile Computing
- Bachelor of Science in Internet of Things and Big Data
- Diploma in Web Application Development
- Diploma in Multimedia Technology

The Department of Mobile and Pervasive Computing also offers postgraduate programs with the help of their School of Graduate Studies and Research. The following postgraduate programs are offered by the department.

===== Postgraduate Programs =====
- Master of Science in Big Data and Internet of Things
- Master of Philosophy in Big Data and Internet of Things

==== Department of Information Systems ====
The Department of Information Systems aims to provide courses that provide knowledge into the use of information tools in the modern world of information. Below are the programs offered by the department.

===== Programs =====
- Bachelor of Science in Information Systems

==== Department of General Studies ====
The Department of General Science offers language-related courses such as French, Communication Skills, etc that is assigned across the different faculties and departments in the school.

=== Faculty of Engineering ===
The Faculty of Engineering is known for its programs in the field of engineering. The Faculty of Engineering includes 3 departments: Department of Computer Engineering, Department of Electrical and Electronics Engineering, and the Department of Mathematics. The department offers program in Telecommunication Engineering, Computer Engineering, Electrical and Electronics Engineering and Mathematics. The Faculty offers both Degree and Diploma programs.

=== Faculty of IT Business ===
The Faculty of IT Business is managed by the School of Business. The Faculty offers programs that aligns Information Technology with Business. The faculty offers programs such as Bachelor of Science in Accounting with Computing option, Bachelor of Business Administration with multiple options. The faculty also offers postgraduate programs such as Master of Science in Digital Marketing and Master of Philosophy in Digital Marketing.

== See also ==
- List of universities in Ghana
- Ghana
