= Domestic Violence and Victim Support Unit =

- Abbreviation: DOVVSU
- Headquarters: Accra
- Formerly called: Women and Juvenile Unit (WAJU)

The Domestic Violence and Victim Support Unit (DOVVSU) is a unit in the Ghana Police Service. It has the capacity to oversee matters of domestic abuse against women and children. DOVVSU has a mission to prevent, apprehend and prosecute culprits of domestic violence and child abuse.

The unit provides support and protection for victims of domestic abuse by interrelating activities with the Department of Social Welfare, the International Federation of Women Lawyers and the Legal Aid Board. DOVVSU assists victims of sexual abuse, physical assault, fraud and neglect. DOVVSU is mandated by, The 1992 Constitution of the Republic of Ghana, the Police Service Act, the Criminal and other Offences Act, Act 29/60, the Children’s Act, Act, 560 /98, the Juvenile Justice Act, Act 653/2003, Ghana Domestic Violence Act (Act 732) 2007.

== Organization ==
DOVVSU previously Women and Juvenile Unit (WAJU) was introduced in October 1998 as a special unit to handle violence against the vulnerable. Assigned a new name to Domestic Violence and Victim Support Unit in 2005, is composed of police personnel with offices in all regional capitals and desks in majority of districts in Ghana.
