= University Teachers Association of Ghana =

Professional association of university teachers in public schools in Ghana

The University Teachers Association of Ghana (UTAG) is a professional association for university teachers in Ghana that helps in bargaining for the welfare of lecturers across all public universities in Ghana.

== History ==
It was formed in 1964 to ycater for the needs and well-being of members. The body was formerly known as Ghana Association of University Teachers (GAUT), formed by the then expatriate senior members during the 1964/1965 academic year. It organized film shows, musical, dance and theatre performances to entertain members at weekends.

In 1973, the name Ghana Association of University Teachers (GAUT) was changed to University Teachers Association of Ghana (UTAG) by senior members namely R.G. Baeta, John Hyde and Yeboah Amankwah which was purposely to clarify and change the whole conception of the association.

== Governing body ==
The spine of UTAG contains the president, vice president, national secretary and 15 national executives from each of the public universities. The current executives of the association are Associate Professor Solomon Nunoo, president: ric N. Wiah, vice president, Asare Asante-Annor, secretary and Akyene Tetteh, treasurer.

== 2022 strike ==
The University Teachers Association of Ghana (UTAG) called on its members to engage in an indefinite strike on 10 January 2022. The UTAG stated that this action is due to "worsening conditions of service" without sufficient response from the employer.

== 2024 Strike ==
The University Teachers Association of Ghana (UTAG) again strike indefinitely on 10 October over illegal mining popularly known as galamsey.

The National Executive Committee (NEC) of the University Teachers Association of Ghana (UTAG) has asked its members to discontinue the ongoing strike on 29 October 2024. Therefore, students are expected to begin classes on 1 November 2024.

== 2025-2026 Leadership and Industrial disputes ==
In September 2025, Prof.Vera Ogeh Fiador, Head of the Department of Finance at the University of Ghana Business School, was elected UTAG's National President at the association's 22nd Biennial Congress in Aburi, becoming the first woman to hold the position, as she was sworn in on 30 September 2025, suceeing Prof.Mamadu A. Akudugu.

The other national executives elected alongside her were Rev. Dr Ebenezer T. Amanor-Lartey as vice-president , Dr Samuel Kingsford Seglah as national secretary, Prof.Gladys A.A.Nabieu as treasurer, and Dr Rosemary Anderson Akolaa as women's commissioner.

In June 2026, UTAG's National Executive Council gave the government until 30 June 2026 to resolve several outstanding conditions-of-service issues, including the signing of an interim Salary Adjustment Agreement, unpaid teaching allowances, promotion arrears, and salary arrears owed to staff of the University of Media, Arts and Communication, warning that branches would seeks strike mandates from members if the deadline passed unmet.

A nationwide strike planned fo 6 July 2026 was suspended after the government signed the Interim Salary Adjustment Agreement on 2 July, following further assurances from the Finance Minister on outstanding arrears and allowances.

UTAG's leadership stated it would reactivate the planned action without further notice should the government fail to honour its commitments.
