= Driver and Vehicle Licensing Authority =

Ghanaian government agency

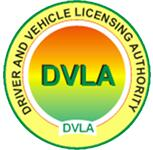

Agency overview
- Formed: 1999
- Jurisdiction: Republic of Ghana
- Headquarters: Ghana
- Parent agency: Ministry of Transport (Ghana)
- Website: http://www.dvla.gov.gh/

Driver and Vehicle Licensing Authority (DVLA) of Ghana is the government agency responsible for the licensing and evaluation of drivers and cars in Ghana.

== History ==
DVLA was established in 1999 by Act 569 of Ghana's parliament. The act allowed the authority to have a semi-autonomous status in the public sector organisation under the Ministry of Transport. The authority is responsible for ensuring safety on Ghanaian roads. The authority before the enactment of the DVLA Act was called Vehicle Examination & Licensing Division (VELD).

== Driver licensing ==
The laws of Ghana permits individuals 18 years and older to drive. Ghanaians and residents of the country can apply for a 3-month learner's licence. After the expiration of the learner's licence, a written exam is conducted of which the would-be driver must score 70% or more to pass. After the written exam, the would-be driver takes a test which involves identification and explanation of several road signs. If the road signs test is passed, the would-be driver takes the last exam drive with a DVLA instructor. An error-free test drive qualifies the driver to a cover note, which is returned for the driving licence on a said date.

== Online registration ==
In April 2008, the authority announced a 306,000 cedi online registration project that sought to streamline the activities of the authority to allow it offer efficient services to its clients. The system was also sought to abolish the activities of middlemen who hampered the operations of the authority. The online system became operational in December 2008.

== Lay off Certification ==
The authority issues Lay off Certificates (L.O.C) to vehicle owner who request for them. The request is granted on both commercial and private vehicles that are not moved for a minimum of 6 months. L.O.Cs allow vehicle owners to save costs by not paying road use fees.

== International licence ==
The Authority issues local Ghanaian driving licences to foreigners whose driving licences are issued by signatories of International Conventions. Requesting for such a licence requires the provision of the foreign driving licence and a translation of it if it is not in the English language and four passport-sized photographs. An eye examination is done and a cover note issued to the individual.
