= Association of Ghana Industries =

Association of Ghana Industries (AGI) is the umbrella body that regulates the activities of industries in Ghana. The body also lobbies the Government of Ghana on issues that affect industries in the country.

== Industrial conference in China ==
The association, together with the Qingdao Cross border E-commerce Association, arranged a corporate and industrial partnership building convention in July 2019 in the city of Qingdao, China. Over 20 Ghanaians attended the summit whilst the Chinese delegation had more than a 100 members. The conference included factory visits to firms in Qingdao. There was also business trip to Zaozhuang to seek industrial opportunities in the Shandong Province.
