= Quartey-Papafio =

Quartey-Papafio is a surname. Notable people with the surname include:

- Benjamin Quartey-Papafio (1859–1924), Ghanaian physician and politician
- Kate Quartey-Papafio, Ghanaian businesswoman
- Mercy ffoulkes-Crabbe (1894–1974), Ghanaian teacher, daughter of Benjamin
