= Edris Allan =

Jamaican activist (1909–1995)

Lady Allan JP
- Lady Allan in 1977
- Born: Edris Elaine Trottman; 19 April 1909; Linstead, St Catherine, Colony of Jamaica, British Empire
- Died: 16 May 1995 (aged 86); Kingston, Jamaica
- Occupations: clerk; retail manager; telephone operator; community worker
- Years active: 1929–1995
- Spouse: Sir Harold Allan

Edris Elaine, Lady Allan (née Trottman; 19 April 1909 – 16 May 1995) was a Jamaican community worker, political figure and women's rights advocate. From childhood, she performed community service and worked as a clerk in several retail establishments prior to her marriage. She was the first telephone operator for the Jamaica All Island Telephone Service. As the wife of Sir Harold Allan, honored with the first knighthood bestowed on a Jamaican of African descent by the British crown, she became an instant celebrity, traveling often with her husband and serving as his secretary. A founding member of the Jamaica Federation of Women (JFW), she held many offices in the organization including serving as chair from 1959 to 1962 and again from 1971 to 1976, and then president from 1976 until her death in 1995.

== Early life ==
Edris Elaine Trottman (Note: Her name at birth was recorded as Edris Alaine Trodman.) was born on 19 April 1909 in Linstead, Saint Catherine Parish, in the British crown colony of Jamaica to Alice (née Feurtado) and Robert Henry Trottman. She grew up and was educated in Linstead and then moved to Kingston, where she began her career as a clerk at the dry goods store, Sherlock & Smith. She soon began working as a department supervisor at another dry goods store, Nathan & Co. Ltd., where she would remain for ten years. She would credit her experiences in retail with giving her the confidence and skill to work with a broad spectrum of people across varying social classes.

== Activism ==
In 1939, while still working at Nathan's, Trottman met Harold Egbert Allan, a member of the Legislative Council of Jamaica. The couple would date for three years before marrying on 12 February 1941. For the first few years after their marriage, Allan continued to work at Nathan's and then in 1945, she took a post at the Post Office Headquarters, where she became the first telephone operator for the Jamaica All Island Telephone Service. The time period in Jamaican history was pivotal. Living conditions were below standard with poor housing conditions, limited educational facilities, inadequate medical facilities, high unemployment, and low wages, resulting in a succession of labor strikes. Allan worked alongside her husband to bring change to the island, focusing on community service projects providing necessities to the poor, sponsoring education for children, and the establishment of medical clinics throughout the island. She also helped with the management of his business venture in the Capitol Theatre in Port Antonio, which had been the first motion picture theatre in the Portland Parish.

When her husband was honoured as an Officer of the British Empire in 1942, Allan was made a Justice of the Peace for St. Andrew Parish. In 1944, after the passage of Universal Adult Suffrage, Allan joined with Lady Molly Huggins, wife of Governor John Huggins, as one of the founding members of the Jamaica Federation of Women (JFW). Huggins served as president of the organization, with Allan as vice chair. The main goal of the organization was to improve the socio-economic conditions impacting women's lives. They trained women in child care, food preparation, and hygiene, as well as economic endeavors.

Lady Allan, as she became known after her husband was honored as the first Afro-Jamaican knighted by the British Crown in 1948, left her employ at the telephone company after four years, as her hostess and civic duties increased. She was immediately thrust into the limelight as the first "coloured Lady" in Jamaica and she and her husband were feted both at home and abroad. The couple traveled widely throughout the Caribbean and Europe with Lady Allan assisting her husband as his secretary without remuneration, as his stipend was too small to cover all of the costs involved in representing Jamaica at diplomatic tables throughout the world.

On the home front, Lady Allan served on the board of the Jamaica Social Welfare Commission and chaired the Home Economics Committee. In 1949, the JFW initiated an innovative program of mass weddings in an effort to secure and protect the right of support of women and children by eliminating illegitimacy for those who were married under common law. Lady Allan participated as one of the organizers of these mass marriage ceremonies along with Lady Huggins and Mary Morris Knibb, hosting over 3,000 weddings within two years. Unlike many other Afro-Jamaican women who were prevented from joining certain clubs or organizations because of their colour, Lady Allan's social status allowed her to break colour lines, such as at a 1952 women's International Relations Luncheon hosted by the Jamaica Women's Club (JWC). The all-white JWC admitted women who were light-skinned enough to pass as white or Asian, but had only one black member, Lady Allan.

The couple made several trips in connection with negotiations for the General Agreement on Tariffs and Trade to London, Geneva, and Havana. Between 1947 and 1953, Sir Harold served as Jamaica's representative on the GATT negotiations and as chair of the West Indian Delegation to the Havana Conference, successfully negotiating trade safeguards for the country's banana and sugar industries. Often, Lady Allan had her own diplomatic meetings to attend, but continued to act as Sir Harold's secretary. On one such trip, their stipend was inadequate and they had to borrow $1,000 from his Ministerial office. When he died suddenly on 18 February 1953, Lady Allan repaid the loan from her own funds, as the government called the loan due. She received neither the widow's pension or other government benefits, typically extended to other deceased Ministers' spouses.

Between 1954 and 1964, the JFW worked on numerous social improvement projects including a nutrition campaign and a home improvement program which added kitchens and bathrooms to many existing structures. Lady Allan spearheaded the effort and led the committee to raise funds to acquire land and construct a headquarters building for the organization. Raising adequate monies, the structure was completed at 74 Arnold Road in 1956. In 1959, she became chair of the JFW, serving until 1962 and was re-elected to the post from 1971 to 1976. During her tenure as chair, the organization extended its social service programs to include family planning and literacy programs and expanded their international outreach to other women’s groups. She became president of the organization in 1976 and served in that capacity until her death. In 1979 the JFW building was renamed the Lady Allan Building in her honor.

In the 1970s, Lady Allan, along with Lucille Miller and Mavis Watts, led the effort for the JFW to sponsor pre-school programs throughout Jamaica. Because the government provided minimal financial support for education of children between the ages of three and six, the JFW created an initiative to focus on this critical age group. They operated 56 basic schools in Hanover, Kingston, St. Elizabeth, and St. Thomas Parishes. The organization was able to provide financial support through fundraising, local donations and grants from the United States Agency for International Development and in spite of the hardships, including damage from hurricanes to facilities, continued the program for more than two decades. In addition to her work in the JFW, Lady Allan served on the board of directors of the Mico Teachers' Training College. She was appointed to the Minimum Wage Committee, served on the Commission on Beaches and Foreshore Lands, and also worked with the Juvenile Court on a panel of advisory Justices of the Peace.

== Death and legacy ==
Lady Allan died on 16 May 1995, aged 86, at the Nuttall Memorial Hospital in Kingston, Jamaica.

The papers of Sir Harold and Lady Allan were donated by Lady Allan to the Amistad Research Center in New Orleans, Louisiana. They are unique in that they provide information on black leadership in the global civil rights movements and decolonization efforts outside the United States. Microfilm copies of their records were simultaneously donated to the Institute of Jamaica, Jamaican National Archives, and the University of the West Indies.

== Sources ==
- Border, Florence E. (19 June 1978). "Harold Egbert Allan papers, 1923–1974". Amistad Research Center. New Orleans, Louisiana: Tulane University. Archived from the original on 17 February 2019.
- De Barros, Juanita (2014). Reproducing the British Caribbean: Sex, Gender, and Population Politics After Slavery. Chapel Hill, North Carolina: University of North Carolina Press. ISBN 978-1-4696-1605-6.
- Hemming, Wilbert (28 August 1977). "Lady Edris Elaine Allan: Tireless Social Worker …and widow of Jamaica's first black knight" (PDF). The Gleaner Sunday Magazine. Kingston, Jamaica. pp. 1, 8, 14. Archived from the original (PDF) on 13 February 2019.
- Sherman, Gertrude (2 January 1949). "Women of 1948". The Gleaner. Kingston, Jamaica. p. 8 – via Newspaperarchive.com.
- Thompson, Krista A. (2006). An Eye for the Tropics. Durham, North Carolina: Duke University Press. p. 244. ISBN 0-8223-3764-9.
- Ustanny, A. (28 May 1995). "First Lady of the land". The Gleaner. Kingston, Jamaica. p. 89 – via Newspaperarchive.com.
- Appraisal of the 1967–1971 Development Program of the Jamaica Telephone Company Limited (Report). Washington, D.C.: World Bank. 11 January 1967. Report #TO-567b. Archived from the original on 16 February 2019.
- "'Do more for youths'". The Gleaner. Kingston, Jamaica. 2 July 1990. p. 2 – via Newspaperarchive.com.
- "First Mass Wedding at Mandeville". The Gleaner. Kingston, Jamaica. 25 August 1950. p. 11 – via Newspaperarchive.com.
- "Five Couples United in St. Ann Mass Wedding". The Gleaner. Kingston, Jamaica. 27 October 1949. p. 6 – via Newspaperarchive.com.
- "Govt. urged to spend more on pre-schoolers". The Gleaner. Kingston, Jamaica. 18 February 1983. p. 2 – via Newspaperarchive.com.
- "History this week:Constitutional Developments in British Guiana and Jamaica between 1890 and 1945 (Part 3)". Stabroek News. Georgetown, Guyana. 13 May 2010. Archived from the original on 6 November 2018.
- "Jamaican Civil Registration, 1880–1999: Edris Alaine Trodman". FamilySearch. Spanish Town, Jamaica: Registrar General's Department. 19 April 1909. p. 7288. microfilm #1389635, image 527.
- "Knighthood for Mr. Allan (pt. 1)". The Gleaner. Kingston, Jamaica. 11 June 1948. p. 1 – via Newspaperarchive.com. and "Mr. Allan Knighted for Public Services (pt 2)". The Gleaner. Kingston, Jamaica. 11 June 1948. p. 16 – via Newspaperarchive.com.
- "Lady Allan passes on". The Gleaner. Kingston, Jamaica. 17 May 1995. p. 2 – via Newspaperarchive.com.
- "Lady Allan's Day at Linstead". The Gleaner. Kingston, Jamaica. 18 December 1948. p. 11 – via Newspaperarchive.com.
- "My Talk with Lady Allan". The Gleaner. Kingston, Jamaica. 20 June 1948. p. 8 – via Newspaperarchive.com.
- "Paying Tribute". The Gleaner. Kingston, Jamaica. 31 May 1979. p. 1 – via Newspaperarchive.com.
- "Sir Harold Allan Is Dead (pt 1)". The Gleaner. Kingston, Jamaica. 19 February 1953. p. 1 – via Newspaperarchive.com. and "Many Achievements in Life of Service (pt 2)". The Gleaner. Kingston, Jamaica. 19 February 1953. p. 12 – via Newspaperarchive.com.
- "Sir Harold Allan's papers: Microfilm copies given to local institutions". The Gleaner. Kingston, Jamaica. 5 June 1979. p. 2 – via Newspaperarchive.com.
- "Sir Harold Leaves for Festival". The Gleaner. Kingston, Jamaica. 30 May 1951. p. 3 – via Newspaperarchive.com.
- "Six decades of work with J'can women (pt 1)". The Gleaner. Kingston, Jamaica. 24 July 2004. p. C6 – via Newspaperarchive.com. and "Six decades of work with ... (pt 2)". The Gleaner. Kingston, Jamaica. 24 July 2004. p. C7 – via Newspaperarchive.com.
- "Supplement: To be Additional Officers of the Civil Division of the said Most Excellent Order". The London Gazette. No. 35841. London, England. 29 December 1942. Archived from the original on 16 February 2019.
- "Woman of the Week — Lady Allan" (PDF). The Gleaner. Kingston, Jamaica. 31 May 1959. Archived from the original (PDF) on 15 February 2019.
