= National Council of Ghana Women =

The National Council of Ghana Women (NCGW) was a Ghanaian women's organization announced by then prime minister Kwame Nkrumah in 1960. It was disbanded when Nkrumah's government was overthrown in 1966.

== History ==
The NCGW was established in an effort by Kwame Nkrumah's government to centralize women's groups in Ghana. Nkrumah first proposed merging the Ghana Women's League and the Ghana Federation of Women in August 1959. Hannah Kudjoe and Evelyn Amarteifio, leaders of the League and the Federation respectively, both resisted the proposal. However, after July 1960 Nkrumah's hand was strengthened by an influx of new women MPs. He appointed Tawia Adamafio, General Secretary of the CPP, to oversee the amalgamation of the League and the Federation into a single CPP-controlled body. most significantly . Other smaller women's organizations which were merged into the NCGW included the All African Women's League, the Accra Women's Association, the Young Christian Women Association and the Ghana Midwives Association. The National Council of Ghana Women was formally inaugurated by Nkrumah at the CPP national headquarters on September 10, 1960. New formal structures were introduced, sidelining Kudjoe and Amarteifio, and leadership positions were offered to women MPs and wives of party activists.

After the 1966 Ghanaian coup d'état ended Nkrumah's regime, the NCGW was disbanded. Several of its leaders were imprisoned along with other CPP activists.
