= Domestic violence in Ghana =

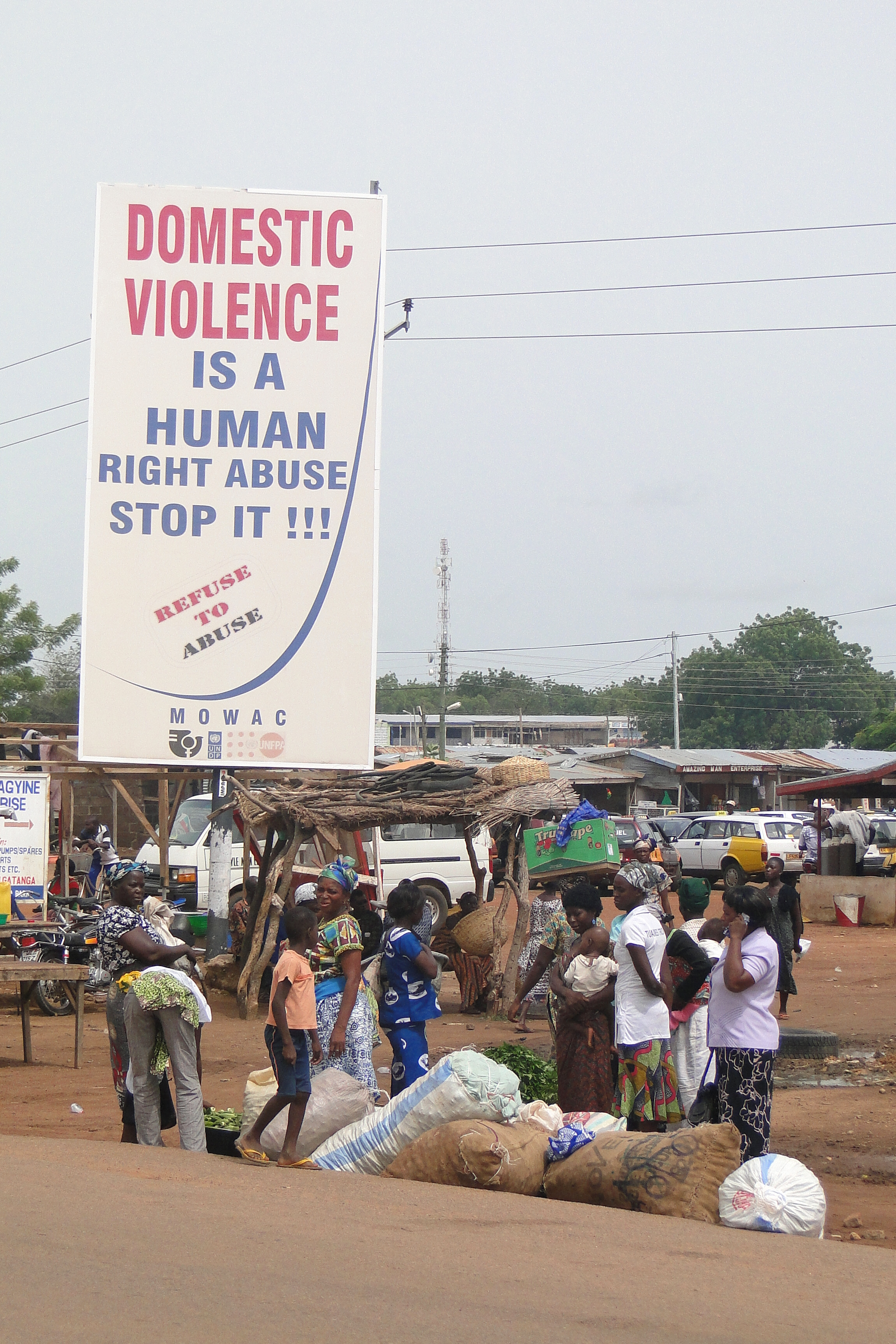
Protests against domestic violence in rural Africa

Domestic violence is prevalent in Ghana, owing in part to a deep cultural belief that it is socially acceptable for men to discipline their wives physically. Around one in three women in Ghana are likely to experience domestic violence.

== Prevalence ==
Domestic violence is more prevalent in rural areas and the northern regions of Ghana. According to a 2011 survey by MICS, 60 percent of Ghanaian women believe that husbands are justified in beating their wives, for a variety of reasons. In 2008, 38.7 percent of Ghanaian women between the ages of 15 and 49 who had ever been married had experienced physical, emotional or sexual violence by a husband or partner at some point in their lives.

The grounds for violence documented in the MICS report include: “if she goes out without telling him; if she neglects the children; if she argues with him; if she refuses [to have] sex with him; if she burns the food; if she insults him; if she refuses to give him food; if she has another partner; if she steals; or if she gossips.” Ghanaian women who are poorly educated and from poor socioeconomic backgrounds are more likely to believe domestic violence is justified.

== Cultural backdrop ==
One of the main reasons for the high incidence is Women in Ghana live in a highly patriarchal society where the man/father is the head of the household and takes all major household decisions. Also many spouses are reluctant to report to police and would rather consult their local spiritual leader. It also seen a more a private matter than legal matter.

== Efforts to counter domestic violence ==
In 2007 the Ghanaian government passed the Domestic Violence Act in an attempt to reduce violence against women. The act encountered significant resistance from cultural conservatives and local religious leaders who believed that such a law would undermine traditional African values, and that Western values were being implemented into law.

In 2014 the Ghanaian government set up a domestic violence board to combat the issue.

== See also ==
- Women in Ghana
- Crime in Ghana
