= Economic Forum =

Economic Forum may refer to:

- Economic Forum (in Poland)
- Ghana Economic Forum
- World Economic Forum, Davos, Switzerland
- St. Petersburg International Economic Forum
