= Charles Hambro, Baron Hambro =

British merchant banker and political fundraiser

The Right Honourable The Lord Hambro
- Charles Hambro
- Born: Charles Eric Alexander Hambro; 24 July 1930
- Died: 7 November 2002 (aged 72); London, England
- Occupation: Merchant banker
- Political party: Conservative Party
- Spouse(s): Rose Cotterell; Cherry Huggins
- Children: 3
- Parent(s): Sir Charles Hambro; Pamela Cobbold
- Relatives: Carl Joachim Hambro (great-great-grandfather); Jocelyn Hambro (cousin); Tatiana Hambro (granddaughter)

Member of the House of Lords
- Lord Temporal
- Life peerage 26 September 1994 – 7 November 2002

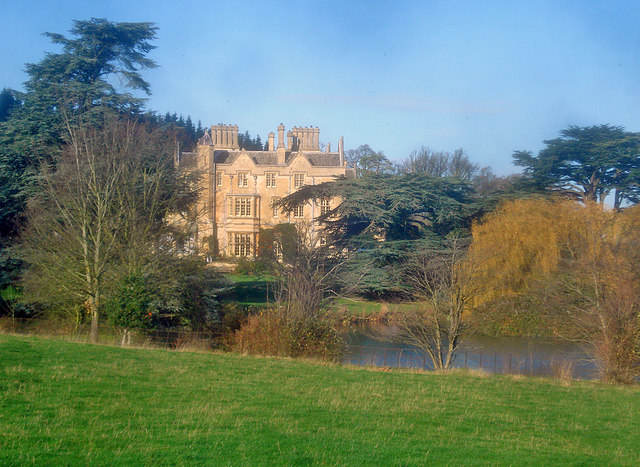
Dumbleton Hall

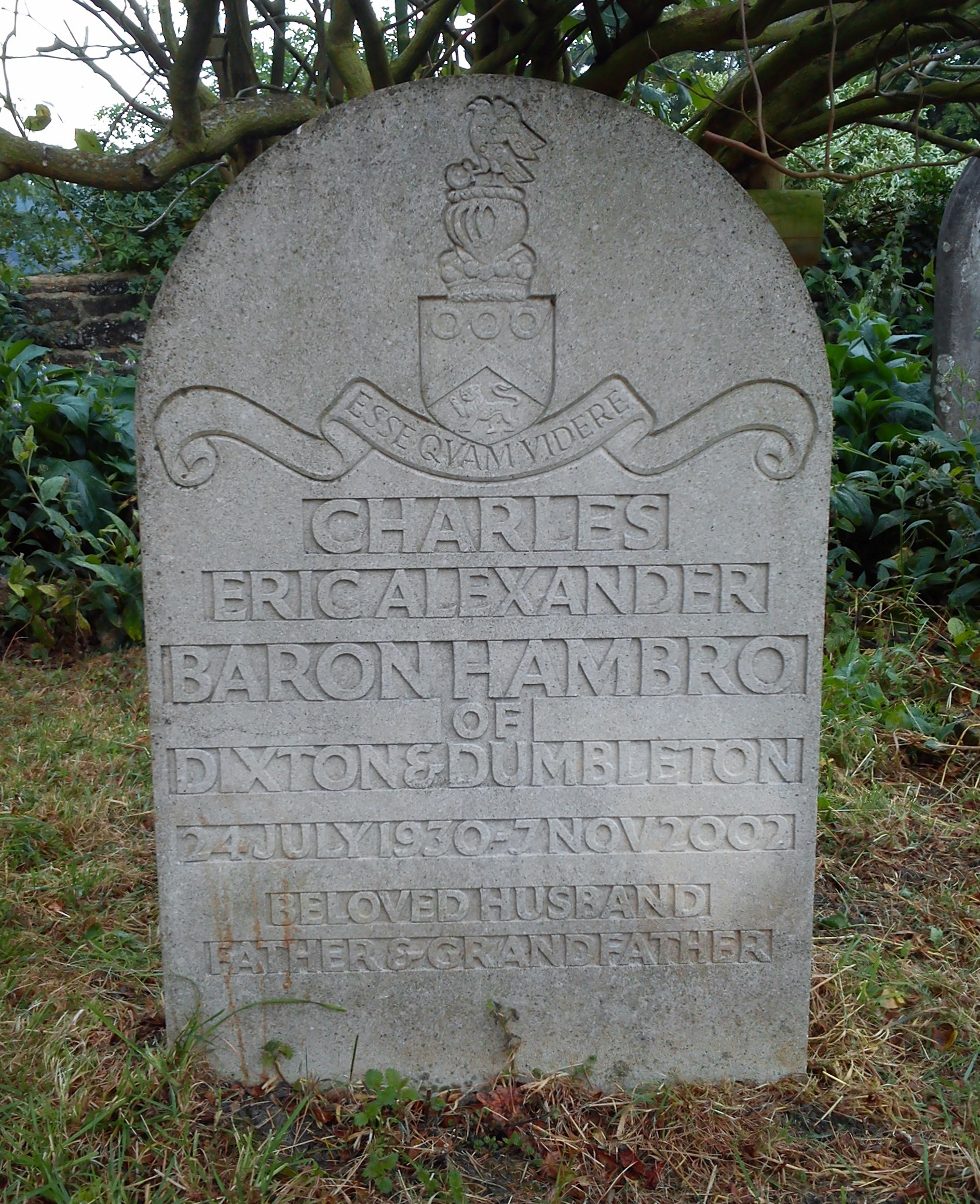
Lord Hambro's grave at St Peter's churchyard, Dumbleton

Charles Hambro, Baron Hambro (24 July 1930 – 7 November 2002) was a British merchant banker and political fundraiser. He was the Chairman of Hambros Bank from 1972 until its merger with Société Générale in 1998. He was the senior honorary treasurer of the Conservative Party from 1993 to 1997.

== Early life ==
Hambro was born on 24 July 1930.

He was an heir to the Hambros Bank. His great-great-grandfather, Carl Joachim Hambro, was an immigrant to England from Denmark who founded the Hambros Bank in 1839. His father was the merchant banker Sir Charles Jocelyn Hambro. His mother, Pamela Cobbold of the East Anglian brewing family, died when he was 21 months old. He grew up at Delcombe Manor in Dorset.

After his mother's death, his stepmother became Dorothy Mackay, who was banker Marcus Wallenberg's ex-wife. During World War II, he was sent to live first with the Wallenbergs in Stockholm and later with the Morgans, another banking dynasty, in New York. He returned to England in 1943.

He was educated at Eton College, where he played on the cricket team. He then served in the Coldstream Guards for two years.

== Career ==
Hambro started his career at the family business, Hambros Bank, in 1952. He was appointed managing director in 1957, deputy chairman in 1965, and chairman in 1972. He was in charge through interesting but turbulent times, beginning with the stock market and property crash of 1973–74. Hambros was one of the leading banks called in by the Bank of England to launch the financial lifeboat which dealt with the collapse of the Slater Walker empire and generally saved the financial system from collapse. In 1998, Hambros Bank was acquired by Société Générale. It represents its private wealth management subsidiary, SG Private Banking.

From 1987 to 1999, he was on the board of directors of the shipping and distribution group P&O. He was on the boards of the Guardian Royal Exchange Assurance and Taylor Woodrow.

== Political activity ==
Hambro was the senior honorary treasurer of the Conservative Party from 1993 to 1997. He was in charge of replenishing the £19 million overdraft. His efforts were rewarded with a life peerage, created 26 September 1994; he took the title Baron Hambro, of Dixton and Dumbleton in the County of Gloucestershire.

== Other roles ==
He was on the board of trustees of the British Museum from 1984 to 1994.

== Personal life ==
On 4 July 1954, Hambro was married to his first wife, Rose Evelyn Cotterell (1932–2006), the daughter of Sir Richard Cotterell, 5th Baronet and Lady Lettice Lygon. Before their divorce in 1976, they had a daughter and two sons:

- Hon. Clare Evelyn Hambro (born 1957), who married Eivind Rabben, son of Knut Rabben, in 1989.
- Hon. Charles Edward Hambro (born 1959), who married Nicole J. Nicholas, daughter of Dr. James A. Nicholas, in 1986. They later divorced.
- Hon. Alexander Robert Hambro (born 1962), who married Harriet "Hattie" Ward Jones, daughter of David Ward Jones, in 1984.

In the same year he divorced his first wife, he married his second wife, Cherry Huggins, daughter of Sir John Huggins, a former Governor of Jamaica. She was a divorcee with one daughter, Miranda. He had nine grandchildren: Christiana, Tatiana, Charles, Edward, Alexander, Marina, Jemima and Sam.

He was the owner of two manors in Gloucestershire: Dixton Manor in Alderton, and Dumbleton Hall in Dumbleton. He organised pheasant shoots on the latter estate. He was a member of the Marylebone Cricket Club. He also gambled at the Bahamian Club in Nassau, Bahamas.

== Death ==
He died on 7 November 2002 in London.

== Arms ==
Coat of arms of Charles Hambro, Baron Hambro
Crest A falcon belled and wings elevated Or semé of annulets and resting the dexter claw on a crescent Azure. Escutcheon Azure a chevron between three annulets in chief and a lion passant in base Or. Supporters Dexter a golden retriever Or sinister a roebuck Azure attired and unguled Or. Motto Fieri Potest
