= Women in Ghana =

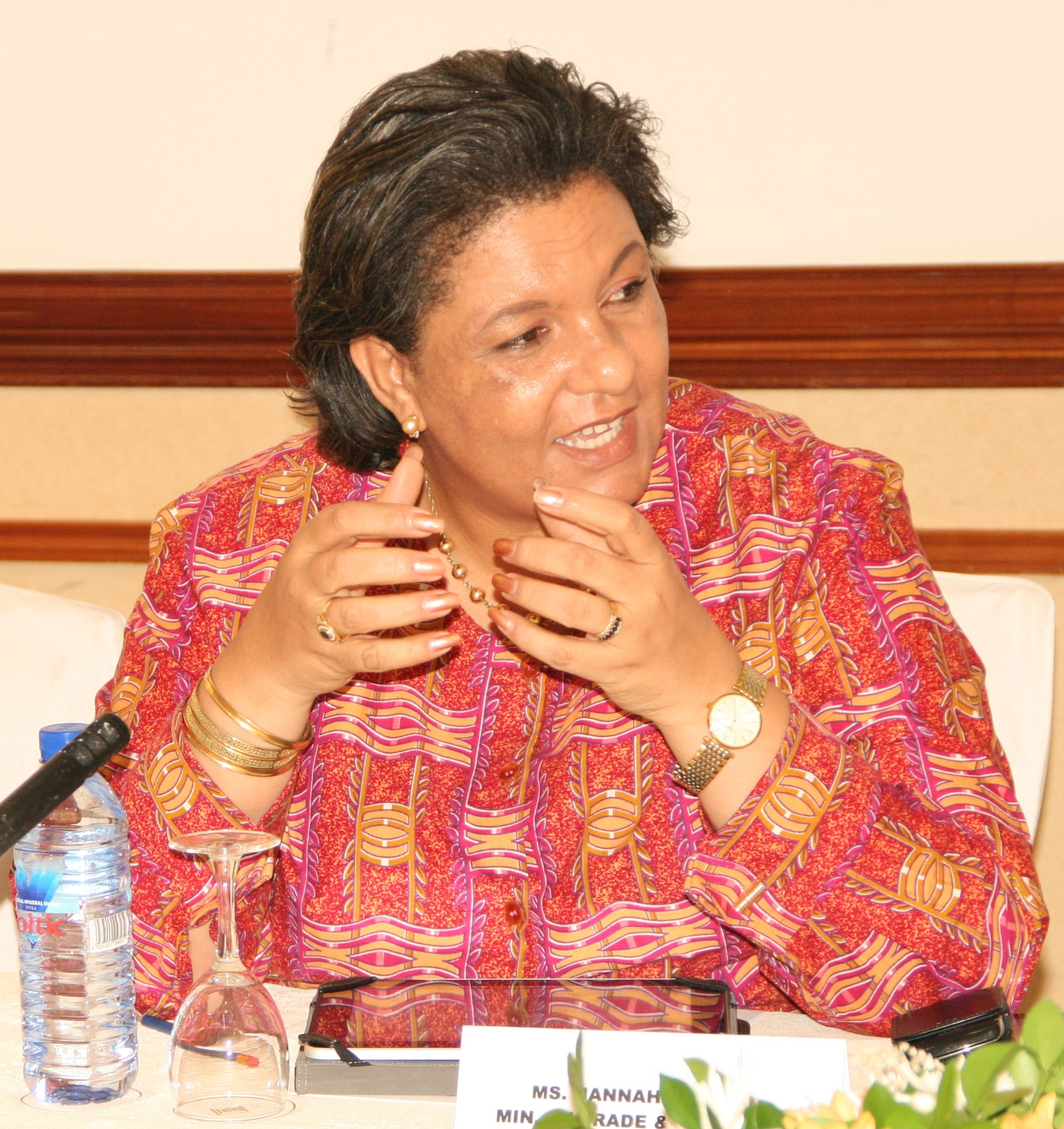
- Minister for Foreign Affairs, Hanna Tetteh

General statistics
- Maternal mortality (per 100,000): 319 (2018)
- Women in parliament: 13.5% (2017)
- Women over 25 with secondary education: 45.7% (2010)
- Women in labour force: 66.9% (2011)

Gender Inequality Index
- Value: 0.529 (2021)
- Rank: 130th out of 191

Global Gender Gap Index
- Value: 0.672 (2022)
- Rank: 108th out of 146

The status of women in Ghana and their roles in Ghanaian society has changed over the past few decades. There has been a slow increase in the political participation of Ghanaian women throughout history. Women are given equal rights under the Constitution of Ghana, yet disparities in education, employment, and health for women remain prevalent. Additionally, women have much less access to resources than men in Ghana do. Ghanaian women in rural and urban areas face slightly different challenges. Throughout Ghana, female-headed households are increasing.

Multiple forms of violence against women still exist in Ghana. In recent years, feminist organizations and women's rights groups have increased. Efforts to bring about gender equality continue to grow in Ghana. The government of Ghana has signed on to numerous international goals and conventions to enhance women's rights in Ghana.

== Politics ==
Although women are guaranteed political participation rights under the 1992 Ghana Constitution, there is a lack of female representation in government. There has never been a female president in Ghana. In 2012, 19 women occupied seats in Parliament, while 246 men occupied the rest of the seats. In 2017, women's representation in Parliament increased, with 37 women elected. However, Ghanaian women still make up only 13.5% of Parliament. In the courts, the Chief Justice is Sophia Akuffo, the second woman to be appointed to this position. The first woman to be appointed as Chief Justice was Georgina Wood. Additionally, women only make up a small percentage of the total judges in high and Supreme Courts. In 2009, 23% of Supreme Court judges were women.

There has been a slow increase of women in Parliament since the adoption of the multiparty system in 1992. Ghana has taken multiple steps to increase equality in the political sphere. For example, the government signed and ratified the Convention on the Elimination of All Forms of Discrimination (CEDAW). Many institutions in Ghana work to advance women's rights and welfare issues. Women's groups and activists in Ghana are demanding gender policies and programmes to improve the livelihood of women. Additionally, the government has a ministry dedicated to women, and the Ministry of Gender, Children and Social Protection focuses on policy formation on issues that pertain specifically to women and children. Despite the efforts of NGOs and political parties, female participation in politics in Ghana remains low.

The lack of political participation from women in Ghana can be attributed to longstanding cultural norms. The traditional belief that women in Ghana should not have responsibilities outside the home contributes to the deficiency of women in politics. Leadership is also a skill that is traditionally associated with boys and men. When women in Ghana take leadership positions, they can face discrimination.

== Family structure ==
=== Marriage ===
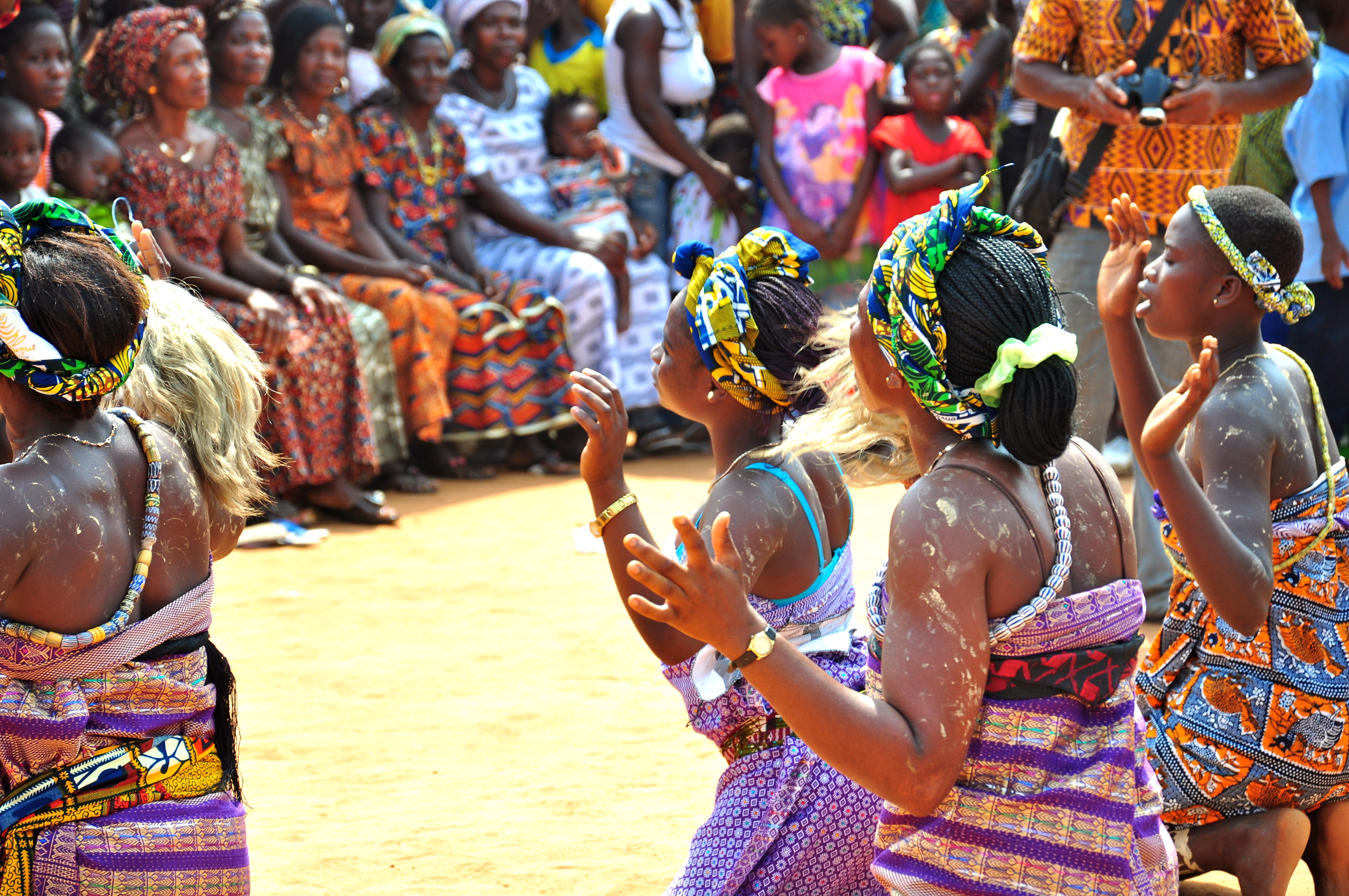
marriage and culture In Ghana

Polygyny refers to marriages in which men are permitted to have more than one wife at the same time. In precolonial times, polygyny was encouraged, especially for wealthy men. Polygamy was traditionally seen as a source of labor for men, as multiple wives allowed for more unpaid labor. In patrilineal societies, dowry received from marrying off daughters was also a traditional means for fathers to accumulate additional wealth. Today, the percentage of women in polygynous marriages in rural areas (23.9%) is almost double that of women in urban areas (12.4%). The age group with the most women in polygynous marriages is 45–49, followed by the 15–19 age group and the 40–44 group. Rates of polygynous marriages decrease as education level and wealth level increase.

In traditional societies, marriage under customary law was often arranged or agreed upon by the fathers and other senior kinsmen of the prospective bride and bridegroom. This type of marriage served to link two families/groups together in social relationships; hence, marriage within the ethnic group and in the immediate locality was encouraged. The age at which marriage was arranged varied among ethnic groups, but men generally married women somewhat younger than they were. Some of the marriages were even arranged by the families long before the girl attained puberty. In these matters, family considerations outweighed personal ones – a situation that further reinforced the subservient position of the wife.

The alienation of women from the acquisition of wealth, even in conjugal relationships, was strengthened by traditional living arrangements. Among matrilineal groups, such as the Akan, married women continued to reside at their maternal homes. Meals prepared by the wife would be carried to the husband at his maternal house. In polygynous situations, visitation schedules would be arranged. The separate living patterns reinforced the idea that each spouse is subject to the authority of a different household head, and because spouses are always members of different lineages, each is ultimately subject to the authority of the senior men of his or her lineage. The wife, as an outsider in the husband's family, would not inherit any of his property, other than that granted to her by her husband as gifts in token appreciation of years of devotion. The children from this matrilineal marriage would be expected to inherit from their mother's family.

The Dagombas, on the other hand, inherit from their fathers. In these patrilineal societies where the domestic group includes the man, his wife or wives, their children, and perhaps several dependent relatives, the wife was brought into closer proximity to the husband and his paternal family. Her male children also assured her of more direct access to the wealth accumulated in the marriage with her husband.

Today, marriage dynamics generally vary between rural and urban areas. Polygyny is more common in rural areas, and a married woman is usually supported by large groups of relatives as well as co-wives. Urban Ghana has generally adopted a more "Western" practice of marriage. The urban woman is held more responsible for choosing her own husband, as it is not based on lineage or her family's interests. Furthermore, the urban woman is seen as more of a partner than as a minor, as she would be in many rural settings. That being said, it can often be harder for the urban woman to address grievances or leave her husband because of that responsibility and lack of familial support that rural women often have.

Ghana’s child protection law, the Children’s Act, prohibits child marriage. Nevertheless, data from 2011 shows that 6% of girls nationwide were married before the age of 15. Between 2002 and 2012, 7% of adolescent females (aged 15–19) were currently married. Most of these women live in the Volta, Western, and Northern regions, and they generally live in rural areas regardless of region.

=== Familial roles ===
Women in premodern Ghanaian society were seen as bearers of children, farmers and retailers of produce. Within the traditional sphere, the childbearing ability of women was explained as the means by which lineage ancestors were allowed to be reborn. Barrenness was, therefore, considered the greatest misfortune. Given the male dominance in traditional society, some economic anthropologists have explained a female's ability to reproduce as the most important means by which women ensured social and economic security for themselves, especially if they bore male children.

Rates of female-headed households are on the rise in Ghana. The number of female-headed households who are either widowed or divorced has also risen over time. Contrary to worldwide findings that female poverty is correlated with higher rates of female-headed households, findings from the Ghana Living Standards Survey indicate that female-headed households may not actually experience higher poverty than male-headed households. This is because reasons that households are headed by females differ across the country. Marital status is a significant factor in understanding differences in poverty rates. For example, widows are the group of female-headed households that exhibit the highest rates of poverty. Especially in polygynous cases, not all women live in the same household as their husband. Therefore, female-headed households headed by married women are best-off in terms of poverty, followed by divorced females, and widowed females.

Social norms and assigned roles for women is one of Ghana’s main issues. There are social standards that women in Africa have to follow, depending on their culture and religion. There are other factors which compound a woman’s social norms. For example, president's wives in Africa are required to be present at official functions. Additionally, if a woman is unsuccessful in providing a son, her husband might take another wife. A way to fix social norm is by making school enrollment higher for women due to higher knowledge of the topic, and higher positioning of women throughout the continent. Being able to change expectations put onto women and rules that cultures have, is difficult due to having to change the mindset of either a culture, a religion or a government.

Overall, women in female-headed households bear more household and market work than men do in male-headed households, largely because the female head of household is usually the only adult of working age or ability. Men are usually able to distribute work with a female spouse in male-headed households, as most men in male-headed households are married. Additionally, the amount of domestic work performed by women when living with or without a spouse does not vary, leading to the conclusion that males generally make little to no significant contribution to domestic work. Further, women who are the heads of household generally own about 12 fewer hectares of land than male heads of household. The disparity in land ownership increases as wealth increases.

=== Family size ===
In their Seven Roles of Women: Impact of Education, Migration, and Employment on Ghanaian Mother (International Labour Office, 1987), Christine Oppong and Katherine Abu recorded field interviews in Ghana that confirmed a traditional view of procreation. Citing figures from the Ghana fertility survey of 1983, the authors concluded that about 60 percent of women in the country preferred to have large families of five or more children. The largest number of children per woman was found in the rural areas where the traditional concept of family was strongest. Uneducated urban women also had large families.

On the average, urbanized, educated, and employed women had fewer children. On the whole, all the interviewed groups saw childbirth as an essential role for women in society, either for the benefits it bestows upon the mother or for the honour it brings to her family. The security that procreation provided was greater in the case of rural and uneducated women. By contrast, the number of children per mother declined for women with post-elementary education and outside employment; with guaranteed incomes and little time at their disposal in their combined roles as mothers and employees, the desire to procreate declined.

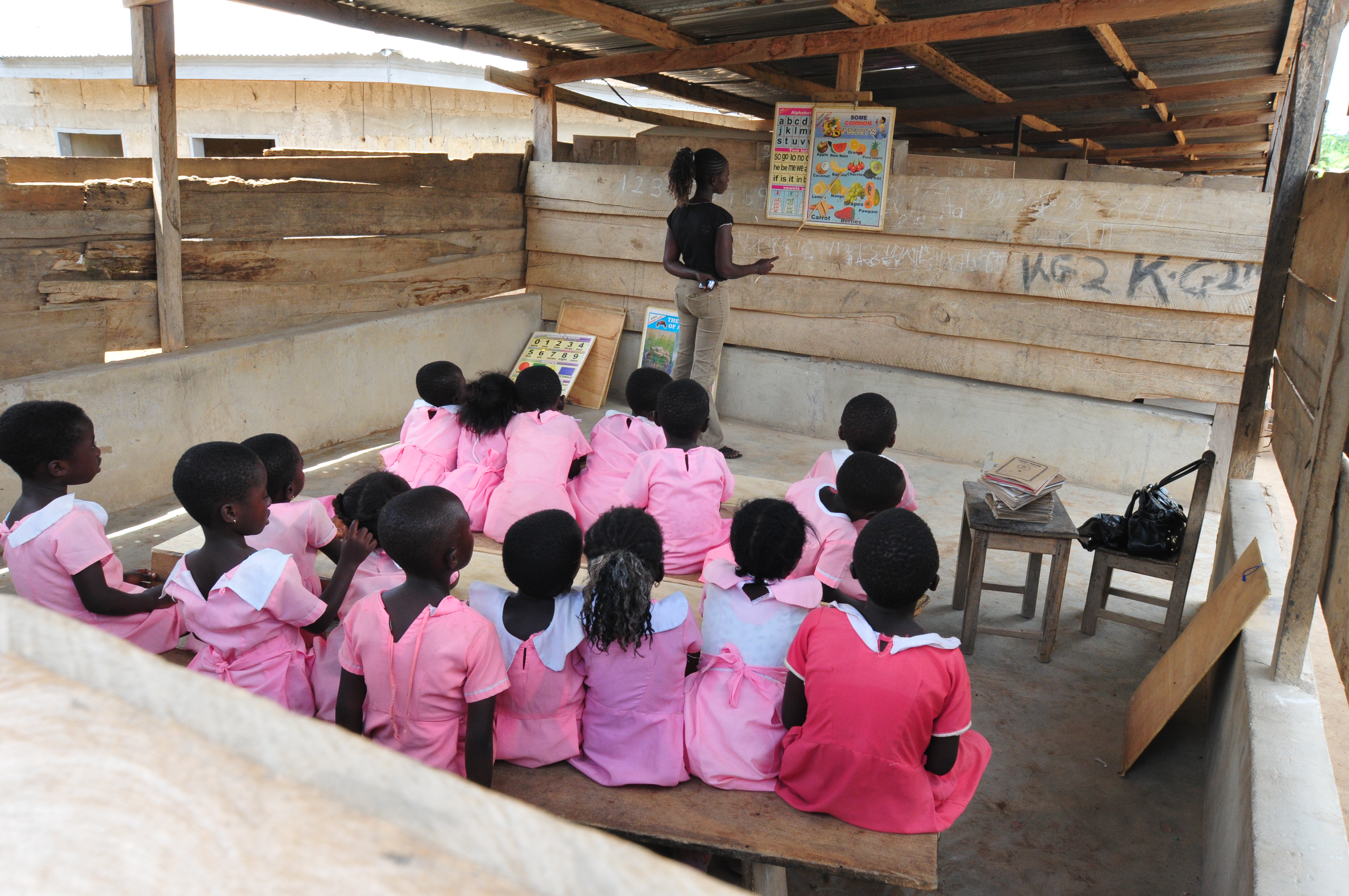
Young girls attend school in Ghana.

== Education ==
The transition into the modern world has been slow for women in Ghana. High rates of female fertility in Ghana in the 1980s exhibit, historically, that women's primary role was that of child-bearing. Some parents were reluctant to send their daughters to school because their labour was needed in the home or on the farm. Resistance to female education also stems from the conviction that women would be supported by their husbands. In some circles, there was even the fear that a girl's marriage prospects diminished when she became educated.

Where girls went to school, most of them did not continue after receiving the basic education certification. Others did not even complete the elementary level of education, despite the Education Act of 1960 which expanded and required elementary school. At numerous workshops organized by the National Council on Women and Development (NCWD) between 1989 and 1990, the alarming drop-out rate among girls at the elementary school level caused great concern.

Given the drop-out rate among girls, the NCWD called upon the government to find ways to remedy the situation. The disparity between male and female education in Ghana was again reflected in the 1984 national census. Although the ratio of male to female registration in elementary schools was 55 to 45, the percentage of girls at the secondary-school level dropped considerably, and only about 17 percent of them were registered in the nation's universities in 1984. According to United Nations Educational, Scientific, and Cultural Organization (UNESCO) figures published in 1991, the percentage of the female population registered at various levels of the nation's educational system in 1989 showed no improvement over those recorded in 1984.

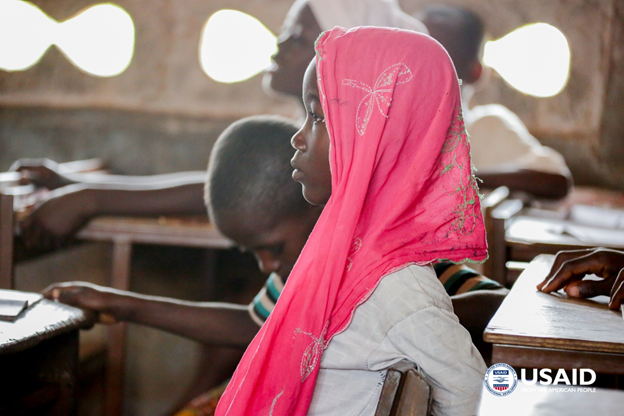
Girl- child education in Ghana

Girls' access to education has shown improvement since then. Even though women have a higher population percentage, education rates are 10 percent higher for men. During 2008–12, the national literacy rate for young women aged 15–24 was 83.2%, only slightly lower than that for males of the same age group (88.3%). However, literacy rates fluctuate across the country and across socioeconomic statuses. By region, literacy rates for girls range from 44% to 81%. Women living at the highest socioeconomic status exhibit the highest literacy rates at 85%, while only 31% of women living in the poorest homes are literate.

Inequality in gender enrollment in school remains an issue in Ghana. Economic and cultural norms factor into the decision of whether a son or daughter will attend school if a family cannot afford to send multiple children. There is a remaining cultural belief that women and girls main purpose is reproduction, therefore boys are sent to receive an education as it is believed they will be the breadwinner for the family. A study done by Mahama & Nkegbe found that urban schools in Ghana averaged two boys per each girl. In both rural and urban areas, boys are preferred over girls for school enrollment.

Based on household populations, about 50% of men and only 29% of women have attained secondary schooling or higher. However, more girls are in school now and are continuing into secondary school. Over the timespan of 2008–2012, 4% more girls were enrolled in preschool than boys. Net enrollment and attendance ratios for primary school were both about the same for boys and girls, net enrollment standing at about 84% and net attendance at about 73%. Enrollment in secondary school for girls was slightly lower than for boys (44.4% vs. 48.1%), but girls' attendance was higher by about the same difference (39.7% vs. 43.6%).

Public university education in Ghana has been found to be inequitable. Women only "make up 34.9% of tertiary enrollment," and admissions tend to prefer students who come from wealthier backgrounds.

== Employment ==
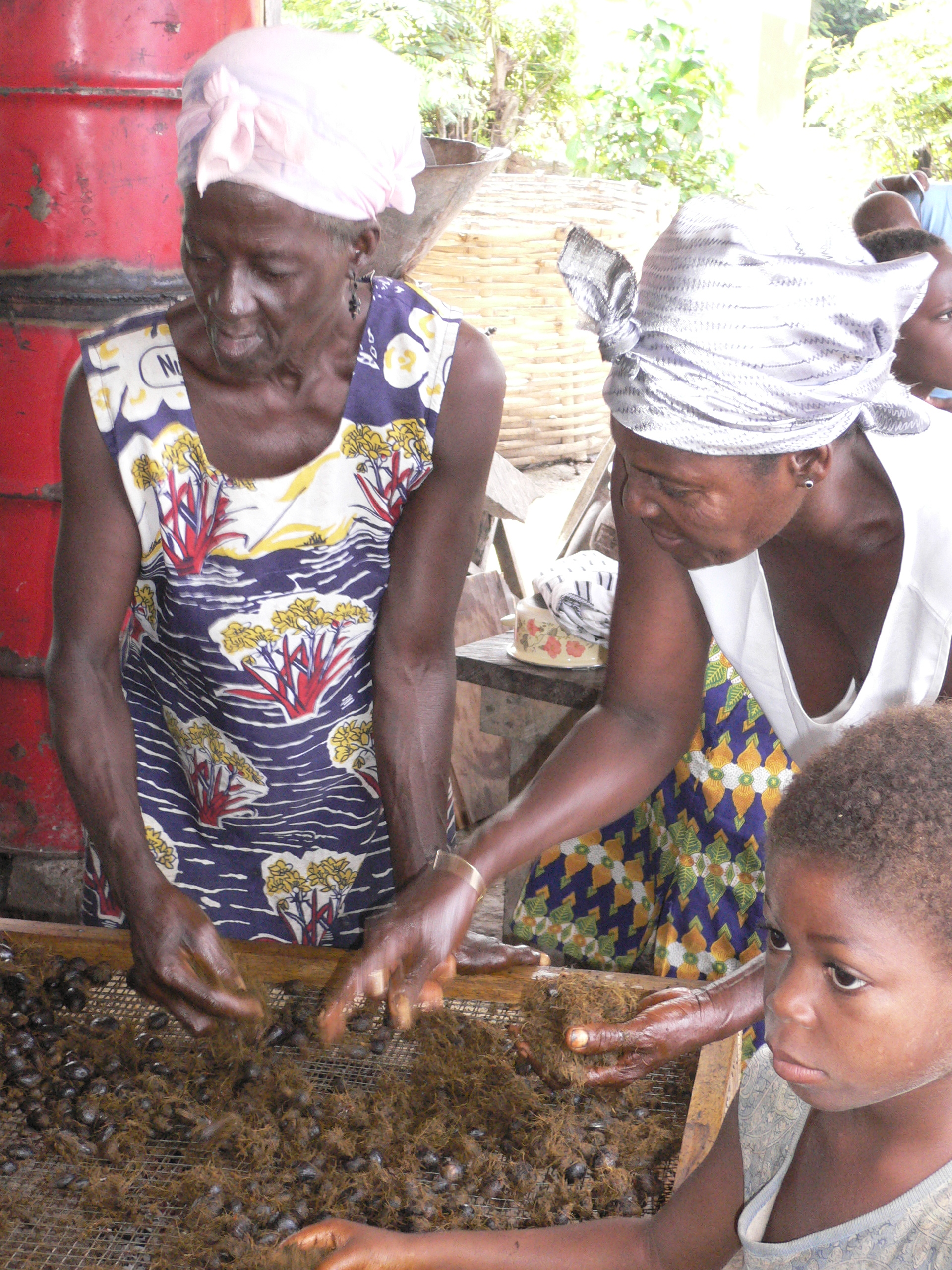
Two women work in Ghana to produce palm oil.

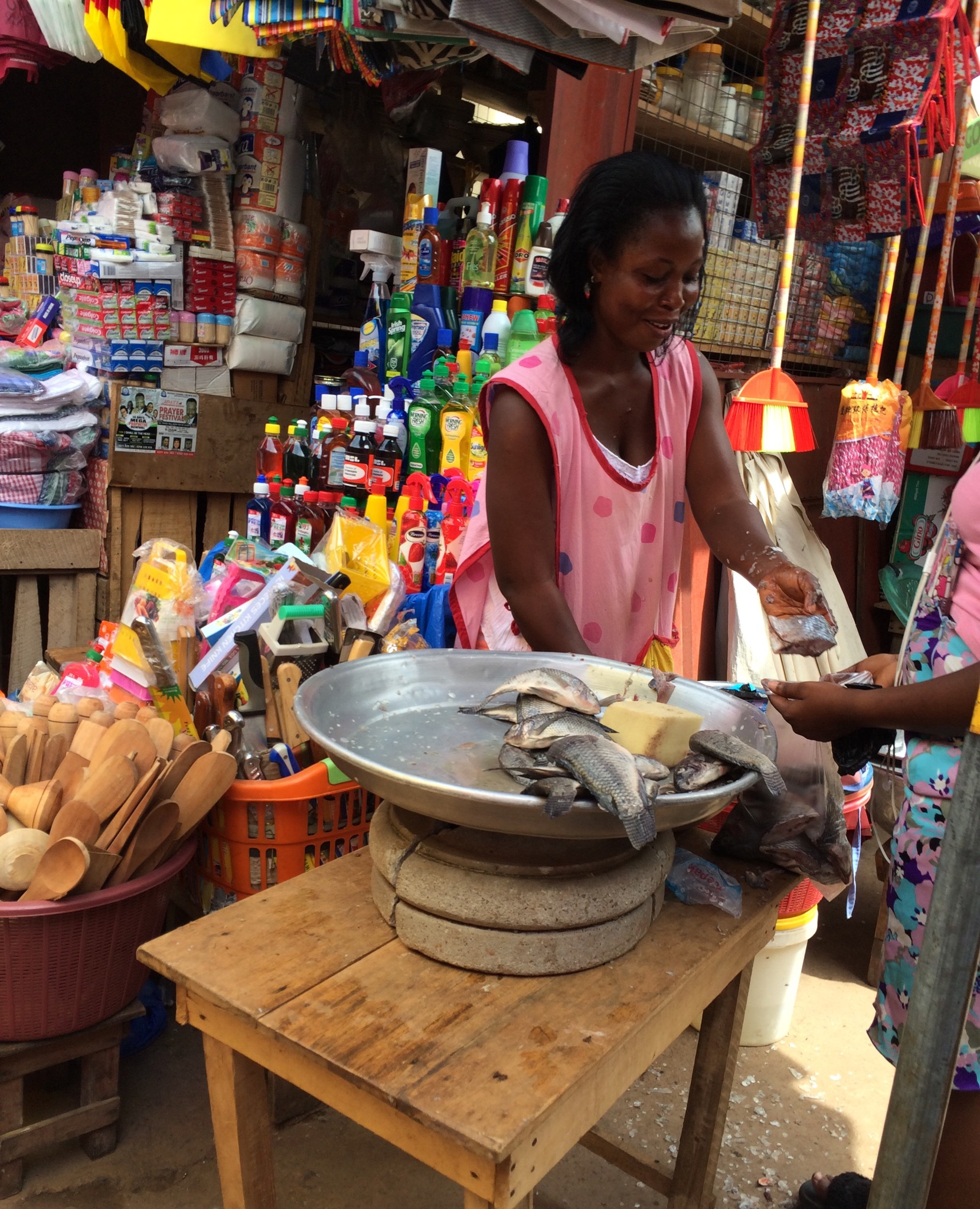
Women working in the market to earn a living

During pre-modern Ghanaian society, in rural areas of Ghana where non-commercial agricultural production was the main economic activity, women worked the land. Although women made up a large portion of agricultural work, in 1996 it was reported that women only accounted for 26.1% of farm owners or managers. Coastal women also sold fish caught by men. Many of the financial benefits that accrued to these women went into upkeep of the household, while those of the man were reinvested in an enterprise that was often perceived as belonging to his extended family. This traditional division of wealth placed women in positions subordinate to men. The persistence of such values in traditional Ghanaian society may explain some of the resistance to female education in the past.

For women of little or no education who lived in urban centres, commerce was the most common form of economic activity in the 1980s. At urban market centres throughout the country, women from the rural areas brought their goods to trade. Other women specialized in buying agricultural produce at discounted prices at the rural farms and selling it to retailers in the city. These economic activities were crucial in sustaining the general urban population. From the mid-1970s to the early 1980s, however, urban market women, especially those who specialized in trading manufactured goods, gained reputations for manipulating market conditions and were accused of exacerbating the country's already difficult economic situation. With the introduction of the Economic Recovery Program in 1983 and the consequent successes reported throughout that decade, these accusations began to subside.

Today, women make up 43.1% of economically active population in Ghana, the majority working in the informal sector and in food crop farming. In crop farming, women the majority of women work in weeding, planting, and selling food crops. About 91% of women in the informal sector experience gender segregation and typically work for low wages. Within the informal sector, women usually work in personal services. There are distinct differences in artisan apprenticeships offered to women and men, as well. Men are offered a much wider range of apprenticeships such as carpenters, masons, blacksmiths, mechanics, painters, repairers of electrical and electronic appliances, upholsters, metal workers, car sprayers, etc. In contrast, most female artisans are only involved in either hairdressing or dressmaking. Women generally experience a disparity in earnings, receiving a daily average of 6,280 cedis compared to 8,560 cedis received by men according to the Ghana Living Standards Survey.

Women are flourishing in teaching professions. Early 1990s' data showed that about 19 percent of the instructional staff at the nation's three universities in 1990 was female. Of the teaching staff in specialized and diploma-granting institutions, 20 percent was female; elsewhere, corresponding figures were 21 percent at the secondary-school level; 23 percent at the middle-school level, and as high as 42 percent at the primary-school level. Women also dominated the secretarial and nursing professions in Ghana. Although women have been assigned secretarial roles, some women are bridging the gap by learning how to code and take on men's roles such as painters, electricians, etc. This is changing the discourse on the role of women in the workplace and the nature of their jobs has been evolving with time. When women were employed in the same line of work as men, they were paid equal wages, and were granted maternity leave with pay. However, women in research professions report experiencing more difficulties than men in the same field, which can be linked to restricted professional networks for women because of lingering traditional familial roles.

== Health ==
Reproduction related cases are the cause of many health problems for women in Ghana. According to UNICEF, the mortality rate for girls under five years old in 2012 was 66 per 1,000 girls. This number was lower than that for boys, which was 77 per 1,000. Abortion is the highest contributor to maternal mortality in Ghana. There is a cultural stigma around abortion due to cultural and traditional values, and as a result, safe abortion services are not easily accessible for many women in Ghana.

=== HIV/AIDS ===
Compared to other Sub-Saharan countries, Ghana has a low prevalence of HIV/AIDS. However, out of an estimated 240,000 people living with HIV/AIDS in Ghana, about half are women. During the span of 2008–2012, 36.8% of young women aged 15–24 and 34.5% of adolescent girls exhibited comprehensive knowledge about the prevention of HIV/AIDS, which is defined by UNICEF as being able to "correctly identify the two major ways of preventing the sexual transmission of HIV (using condoms and limiting sex to one faithful, uninfected partner), who reject the two most common local misconceptions about HIV transmission, and who know that a healthy-looking person can have HIV." Women and girls generally have less knowledge about the HIV/AIDS epidemic.

The Ministry of Health and the Ghana AIDS Commission have helped to create policy to address the HIV/AIDS epidemic. Studies have also found that religious education is beneficial in HIV prevention and helped reduce stigma in adolescents.

=== Maternal health ===
The birthrate for adolescents (aged 15–19) in Ghana is 60 per 1000 women. The rates between rural and urban areas of the country, however, vary greatly (89 and 33 per 1000 women, respectively). For urban women, 2.3% of women have a child before age 15 and 16.7% of women have a child before the age 18. For rural women, 4% have a child before age 15 and 25% have a child before age 18. There have been organizations that have helped with the issue of maternal health, such as the United Nations and the Accelerated Child Survival Development Program. Both fought against abortions, and reduced about 50 percent of the child and maternal mortality rates.

Among women 15–49 years old, 34.3% are using contraception. Contraception use is positively correlated with education level. Sometimes, women want to either postpone the next birth or stop having children completely, but don't have access to contraception. According to MICS, this is called unmet need. Prevalence of unmet need is highest for women aged 15–19 (61.6%). Highest rates of met need for contraception are found in the richest women, women with secondary education or higher, and women ages 20–39.

In 2011, the Government of Ghana announced that it had eliminated maternal and neonatal tetanus. This was an achievement on the route to meeting one of the Millennium Development Goals (MDG), which is to reduce the maternal mortality ratio by three quarters.

Pregnant women are more vulnerable to malaria due to depression of the immune system. Malaria may lead to malaria-induced anemia and may also cause low birth weights. Pregnant women in Ghana are encouraged to sleep under a mosquito net to avoid such infections from mosquito bites. Nationally, 33% of pregnant women slept under mosquito nets in 2011, which fell short of the goal of 65% by 2011. More than twice as many pregnant women sleep under mosquito nets in rural areas than in urban areas, and the same is true of uneducated women in comparison to women who had completed secondary education or higher. The correlation between these two rates may be due to more educated women living in urban areas, and more uneducated women living in rural areas. In accordance, the poorest women in Ghana show the highest rates of sleeping under mosquito nets, while the richest show the lowest rates.

==== Abortion ====
A law passed in 1985 allows for legal abortion in Ghana under certain conditions. These conditions include rape, incest, or risk the mental or physical health of the woman. However, unsafe abortion remains prevalent, and abortion remains the highest contributor to maternal mortality. A study done by Sundaram et alt. found that Ghanaian women who seek unsafe abortions tend to be younger and poorer. Cultural stigma surrounding abortion contributes to women and girls seeking unsafe abortions.

=== Health insurance ===
Among women in the poorest households, only 57.4% have ever registered with the National Health Insurance Scheme, as compared with 74.2% of women in the richest households in Ghana. Women in urban areas also had higher registration rates than women in rural areas (70.9% and 66.3%, respectively). In order to become a member of NHIS, one must either pay a premium, register for free maternal care, or is exempt as an indigent. Of the women who achieved NHIS membership, 28.6% paid for the premium themselves. The majority of women (59.5%) had their premium paid for by a friend or relative, and only 1.0% had it paid for by their employer. Most women (39.2%) who did not register for NHIS did not do so because the premium was too expensive.

== Violence against women ==
Women of all ages, socio-economic statuses, and geographic location in Ghana are affected by different forms of violence against women. There are multiple forms of violence against women present in Ghana, such as domestic violence, rape, and female genital mutilation. Violence against women in Ghana also includes emotional, psychological, and economic violence.

Domestic violence is one of the most common forms of violence against women in Ghana. A study done in 2015, led by the Institute of Development Studies, found that 27.7% of women in Ghana had experienced domestic violence within the past 12 months. Many acts of violence against women in Ghana have gone unreported, as there are social stigmas that are associated with these acts. However, the number of cases of violence against women in Ghana has been increasing every year. Media coverage of violence against women often presents cases of violence against women as individual incidents, and often blame the event on the victim.

Historically, Ghanaian women have faced violence from certain cultural practices. For example, Trokosi was a system used by the Ewe tribe, located in the Volta region of Ghana, to repay past crimes. Oftentimes, young girls were given away to priests and would become concubines of that priest. In 1998, a law was passed in Ghana that abolished "customary or ritual servitude."

Efforts have been made by both the government and non-governmental organizations to end acts of violence against women. The Women and Juvenile Unit (WAJU), now known as the Domestic Violence and Victim Support Unit (DOVSU), was established in 1998 for the purpose of handling crimes against women and children. In 2001, the government created the Ministry of Women and Children's Affairs (MWCA) to help non-government organizations and the government in their efforts to address issues of violence against women.

=== Domestic violence ===
There are multiple factors that are believed to be influential in the high rates of domestic violence in Ghana. Cultural norms and practices play a large role in attitudes and perceptions of domestic violence. Traditional gender roles in Ghana keep women in the homes to care of the children, while men are expected to be the breadwinners. Spousal abuse is more common when women choose to follow a career outside the home. Education is also linked to domestic violence. Men who have higher education in Ghana generally do not condone physically abusing their wife. A study done in the BMC Public Health journal found that it is "48% less likely for women to experience domestic violence when husbands had higher than secondary education."

The practice of polygyny in Ghana also contributes to rates of domestic violence. Women who are part of polygynous marriages generally experience higher rates of domestic violence. Additionally, women who are in polygynous marriages are "more likely to come from households where their mothers experienced domestic violence," according to a study done by Ickowitz & Mohanty.

Women in urban areas face different rates of domestic violence than women in rural areas in Ghana. The risk of women facing domestic violence increases by 35% if residing in urban areas. This could be because "most of the women in urban areas may reside in slums or poor urban areas and/or may have higher wealth index (economic status), which may increase their risk of domestic violence."

The Ghanaian government has attempted to end domestic violence against women. The Domestic Violence and Victim Support Unit (DOVSU) is a police unit specifically focused on cases about crimes against women and children. There are currently two special courts that solely hear cases of gender-based violence. In 2007, the Ghanaian Parliament passed the Domestic Violence Act (Act 732). This act condemns multiple forms of domestic violence, including sexual, physical, emotional, economic, and physiological violence.

=== Rape ===
Rape is a major issue in Ghana. It is estimated that 8% of women have been raped and 6% of girls have been raped in Ghana. This is likely a huge underestimate as many women and girls do not report rape due to fears of social stigmatization and shame. Gang rape is also prevalent in Ghana. In 2016, all reported cases of gang rape included a female victim and all male perpetrators. Many women and girls who are victims of gang rape know at least one of the males in the group attacking her. Rape in Ghana is illegal under section 97 of The Criminal Code.

==== Marital rape ====
Marital rape is also a major issue in Ghana. When a woman marries in Ghana, it is a strong cultural belief that they are now under the authority of their husband. Women are often treated as inferior to men. The Criminal Code in Ghana previously had a marriage exception, which stated "a person may revoke any consent which he has given to the use of force against him, and his consent when so revoked shall have no effect for justifying force save that the consent given by a husband or wife at marriage, for the purposes of the marriage, cannot be revoked until the parties are divorced or separated by a judgement or decree of a competent court." In 2007, this marital rape exception was removed from the Criminal Code of Ghana. Despite legislation against marital rape, there remains a social view that the happenings inside the home are private matters and should not be publicly addressed. Therefore, there has been criticism from Ghanaians on prohibiting marital rape.

==== Child sexual assault ====
Young girls also face sexual assault in Ghana. 78% of child sexual assault victims know their offender. There has been a consistent decrease in child sexual abuse cases since 2002. However, there is a huge issue of underreporting of child sexual assault in Ghana. One of the most common reasons cited for not reporting cases of child sexual assault is the belief that shame will be brought upon the victim and the victim's family. Additionally, there is a lack of confidence in the law and police system. The Children's Act of 1998 was passed in part to confront the issue of child sexual assault. Despite legislative action against child sexual assault, cultural norms and practices allow for perpetrators to face little to no consequences.

=== Female genital mutilation ===
Female genital mutilation (FGM) is prevalent in Northern Ghana and Ghana's Upper East Region. It is estimated that 4% of women and girls in Ghana have undergone female genital mutilation. Ghana has taken legislative action to end FGM. The Convention on the Elimination of All Forms of Discrimination against Women (CEDAW) was ratified in 1989, and Ghana declared to be against female circumcision. The Ghanaian Criminal Codes were amended in 1994 to include FGM as an offense. Additionally, FGM is outlawed in the Domestic Violence Act of 2003. Despite these governmental efforts, FGM remains an issue in Ghana.

FGM in Ghana can be performed at multiple points in a girls life. Babies can face FGM at birth if the mother is not circumcised. FGM will be performed on many girls at puberty, as this is seen as a rite of puberty. Additionally, FGM can be performed at death to insure the deceased woman is accepted into the ancestral world. A study done in the Journal of Social Development found that education relates to preference of female circumcision - "men who are illiterate and those who have been to primary school are more likely to prefer circumcised women than those with secondary and higher education."

=== Trafficking ===
The exact number of women and girls involved in human trafficking in Ghana is unknown. Girls and women are often trafficked into the sex trade, either in surrounding African countries or in European countries. Ghana has attempted to address human trafficking issues with the Human Trafficking Act of 2005, however, trafficking remains a problem in Ghana.

=== Witch camps ===
Witch camps can be found at Bonyasi, Gambaga, Gnani, Kpatinga, Kukuo and Naabuli, all in Northern Ghana. Women have been sent to these witch camps when their families or communities believe they have caused harm to the family. Many women in such camps are widows. It is thought that relatives accused them of witchcraft in order to take control of their husbands' possessions. Many women also are mentally ill, a problem that is not well understood in Ghana. The government has said, in 2011, that they intend to close these camps down.

== Women's rights ==
=== Feminist efforts ===
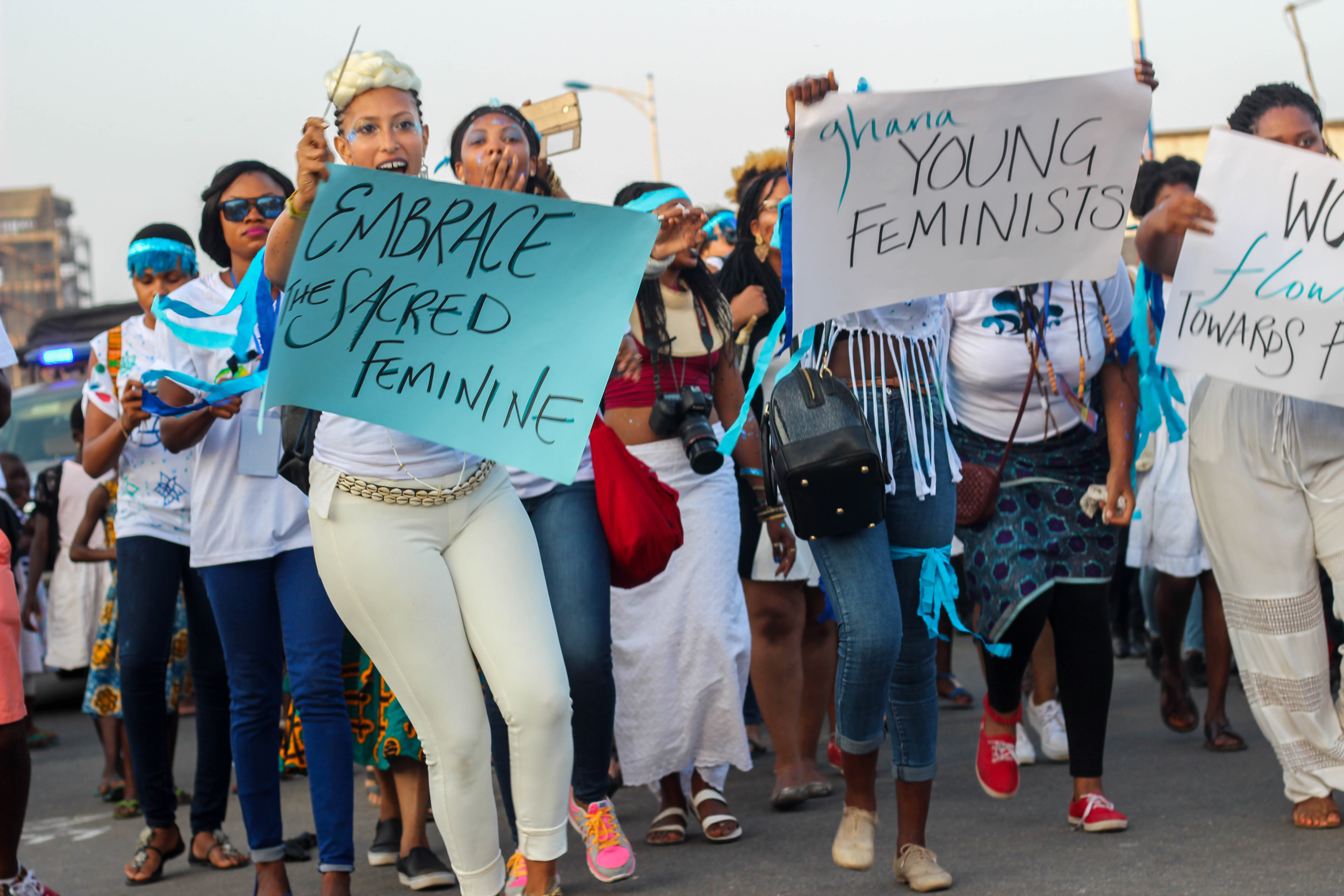
A group of women advocating for feminist on the street in Accra, Ghana

Feminist organizing has increased in Ghana as women seek to obtain a stronger role in their democratic government. In 2004, a coalition of women created the Women's Manifesto for Ghana, a document that demands economic and political equality as well as reproductive health care and other rights. Within this idea of gender inequality comes other problems such as patrilineal and matrilineal inheritance, equal education, wage gaps, and social norms and assigned roles for women. These are some of the main issues Ghanaian women face.

The practice of gender mainstreaming has been debated in Ghana. There is ongoing discourse over whether gender issues should be handled at the national level or by sector ministries and where the economic resources for the women's movement in Ghana should come from. Further, critics of gender mainstreaming argue that the system increases bureaucracy and that it has moved funds and energy away from work for women's rights. The women's movement in Ghana has adopted an attitude towards gender mainstreaming that is much aligned with that of the international women's movement, which is best summarized in a 2004 AWID newsletter: "Mainstreaming [should be] highlighted along with the empowerment of women" and "it appears worthwhile to pick up the empowerment of women again and bring it back to the forefront."

The NCWD is fervent in its stance that the social and economic well-being of women, who compose slightly more than half of the nation's population, cannot be taken for granted. The Council sponsored a number of studies on women's work, education, and training, and on family issues that are relevant in the design and execution of policies for the improvement of the condition of women. Among these considerations, the NCWD stressed family planning, child care, and female education as paramount.

The feminist movement in Ghana since 2016, has been championed by Nana Akosua Hanson. Nana Hanson, a writer, journalist and feminist brings seven years in radio and television to bring to light issues surrounding women and feminism in Ghana as well as pan Africanism. She is the founder of "Drama Queens" a non profit organization spreading women empowerment messages, sex education workshops, sexual violence, equity and inclusion. Nana Akosua Hanson is actively using her theatre and radio platforms to advocate for the significance of providing equal opportunities for women in Ghana. She also uses literature as a tool of empowerment for the Black woman, while advocating for their rights and equality. As a feminist and activist, she holds the belief that given the chance, women in Ghana can be highly impactful. Her approach of utilizing pop culture to communicate messages about women empowerment and development serves as a strategy to engage the youth in reshaping the narrative of feminism in Ghana. In all of her endeavors, Hanson conveys her commitment to addressing the patriarchal system in Ghana, particularly concerning women's rights.

== Notable Ghanaian women ==
- Ama Ata Aidoo
- Sophia Akuffo
- Kadijah Amoah
- Alice Annum
- Yaa Asantewaa
- Ayesha Harruna Attah
- Yaba Badoe
- Samira Bawumia
- Farida Bedwei
- Margaret Busby
- Mabel Dove Danquah
- Joyce Adwoa Akoh Dei
- Akua Sena Dansua
- Mabel Dove Danquah
- Abena Durowaa Mensah
- Angela Dwamena-Aboagye
- Yaa Gyasi
- Hannah Kudjoe
- Nana Oye Lithur
- Lesley Lokko
- Takyiwaa Manuh
- Rose Mensah-Kutin
- Sally Mugabe
- Samia Nkrumah
- Esther Afua Ocloo
- Theodosia Okoh
- Jane Naana Opoku-Agyemang
- Kate Quartey-Papafio
- Efua Sutherland
- Esi Sutherland-Addy
- Hanna Tetteh
- Dzodzi Tsikata
- Georgina Theodora Wood

== See also ==
- Women in Africa
