= Cherry Hambro =

British journalist (1933–2017)

Cherry Hambro Baroness Hambro
- Cherry Huggins, 1960
- Born: 4 December 1933; Penang, Malaysia
- Died: 27 March 2017 (aged 83); Dixton Manor, Gloucestershire, England
- Education: Roedean School; Royal Academy of Dramatic Art
- Occupation: Journalist
- Spouse(s): Peter Twiss (m. 1960; div. 1961) Charles Hambro (m. 1976; died 2002)
- Parents: Sir John Huggins (father); Molly Green (mother)

Cherry Hambro, Baroness Hambro (4 December 1933 – 27 March 2017), born Cherry Felicity Huggins, was a British journalist who was associated with the fashion scene in 1960s swinging London when she worked for Vogue, Queen magazine and as the first fashion editor of the Saturday colour magazine of The Daily Telegraph. In her youth she was known for her love of aircraft, fast cars, fast boats and fast men. Later, she was the second wife of the banker Lord Hambro.

== Early life ==
Cherry Huggins was born in Penang, Malaysia, on 4 December 1933 to Sir John Huggins (1891–1971) and Molly Huggins (née Green). She was the second of three sisters. Her father was a colonial administrator in Penang and subsequently Trinidad. He was governor of Jamaica 1943–51. She was educated at Roedean School in England, and at a finishing school in New York, and studied at the Royal Academy of Dramatic Art in London from the age of 17 where she won the Silver Medal.

Noël Coward visited while the family were at King's House, Jamaica, and wrote a verse for Cherry:

Now Little Cherry Huggins was a glamorous soubrette
And everyone adored her from the vicar to the vet
She seemed to try with eagerness to pass her school exam,
But everyone realised she didn't give a damn

== Speed ==
Huggins learned to fly at the Fairoaks Aero Club near Woking, Surrey, making her first solo flight in 1955. She also enjoyed fast cars and boats and in 1957 turned down a marriage proposal from the racing driver Mike Hawthorn who died in a crash off the racing track in 1959. In 1960, she married her flying instructor Peter Twiss who broke the world air speed record as the first man to fly faster than 1,000 mph. She was the third of his five wives. They had a daughter, the writer Miranda Twiss, who was born in 1961, but they were divorced not long after. In 1963 they both competed in the Daily Express International Offshore Powerboat Race from Cowes to Torquay.

== Career ==
Huggins had a variety of jobs in her early life that included fashion model, television announcer and stage manager. A job on the BBC ended after she was unsuccessfully asked to fill in live airtime by singing "Frankie and Johnny". She took the stage name Cherry Hunter and appeared with Douglas Fairbanks Jr. in 1953 in his TV series Rheingold Theatre.

In the mid-1950s she began to work with Vogue magazine in New York and London and in about 1964 joined Queen magazine where the founder of the magazine, Jocelyn Stevens, nicknamed her "the bulldozer". She subsequently moved to the newly established colour Saturday supplement of The Daily Telegraph, the Weekend Telegraph, where she became the first fashion editor. She later commented, "Fashion had been so boring after the war, suddenly women were sexually liberated. We knew what to do with our bodies and we wanted to express our sense of freedom through fashion." She knew key photographers in 1960s "swinging London" such as David Bailey, Helmut Newton, and Norman Parkinson, and arranged shoots in exotic locations including Greenland and Outer Mongolia. When she photographed Salvador Dalí's muse Amanda Lear on the seashore at Cadaqués wearing Balenciaga, the artist decided to pour petrol on the sea and set light to it.

== Later life ==
She retired from journalism in 1976 after she became the second wife of Charles Hambro. He was a banker, the chairman at his family's business Hambros Bank. She became Lady Hambro when her husband received a life peerage as Baron Hambro in 1994. She devoted herself to supporting her husband, shooting parties, travelling, and hosting dinner parties at her husband's home of Dixton Manor in Gloucestershire. Her husband died in 2002.

Lady Hambro died on 27 March 2017. She was survived by her daughter from her first marriage, Miranda Twiss, and stepchildren from her husband's first marriage.
