= National Federation of Gold Coast Women =

The National Federation of Gold Coast Women (NFGCW), later renamed the Ghana Federation of Women, was a women's organization in the Gold Coast, one of the country's first women's organizations. Established by Evelyn Amarteifio in 1953, it was dissolved in 1960 as Kwame Nkrumah pursued government control of women's organizations in Ghana.

== History ==
In 1953 Evelyn Amarteifio was inspired by the Jamaican Federation of Women to attempt a similar umbrella organization in the Gold Coast:

we had numerous market women, mutual aid societies, church and benevolent women's organizations but no central body. I felt that if we brought together all the organisations, we would be better able to advance the interests of women.

Amarteifio consulted with other women leaders including Georgina Arden-Clarke, head of the Accra Women's Association, various women educators, those involved in the Ghana Girl Guides Association and the Accra Market Women Association. In July–August the NFGCW was established, with Mercy Ffoulkes-Crabbe as president and Fathia Nkrumah as patron.

To improve the situation of women, the federation campaigned for recognition of customary marriages by the colonial government. It petitioned against discrimination in employment, marriage and inheritance. In 1957 it started a quarterly publication, called The Federation and later The Gold Coast Woman.

Internationalist in focus, the NFGCW built contacts through the YWCA with non-aligned international women's organizations such as the Associated Country Women of the World, the International Alliance of Women and the Women's International League for Peace and Freedom. To keep the NFGCW politically non-partisan, Amarteifio tried to resist CPP pressure to create a single government-controlled nationalist women's group. However, in April 1960 the federation was forced to change its name to the National Council of Ghana Women. With funding from Nkrumah's government, the organization hosted a Conference of the Women of Africa and African Descent at University College in Accra in July 1960. The conference was publicized internationally, with support from St. Clair Drake, Dorothy Pizer, Era Bell Thompson, Shirley Graham Du Bois. Speakers included Dorothy Ferebee, Pauli Murray and Anna Arnold Hedgeman.

After the conference, the government pushed to centralize women's groups. On 10 September 1960 Nkrumah officially dissolved the old federation, declaring a new government-controlled National Council of Ghana Women – replacing the NFGCW, the Ghana Women's League and some other smaller women's groups – as the only authorized national women's organization.
