= Amarteifio =

Amarteifio is a Ga-Adangbe surname. Notable people with the surname include:

- Amarkai Amarteifio, Ghanaian soldier, lawyer, sports administrator and politician
- Evelyn Amarteifio (1916–1997), Ghanaian women's organiser
- India Amarteifio (born 2001), English actress
- Nicole Amarteifio (born 1982), Ghanaian film director, producer, and screenwriter
