= Kihoro =

Kihoro is a surname. Notable people with the surname include:

- Patricia Kihoro (born 1986), Kenyan singer, songwriter, actress, and television personality
- Wanjiru Kihoro (1953–2006), Kenyan economist, writer and feminist activist
