= Clapham Park =

Area in the London Borough of Lambeth

Coordinates: 51.455598°N 0.138584°W

- Location within Greater London
- London borough: Lambeth
- Ceremonial county: Greater London
- Region: London
- Country: England
- Sovereign state: United Kingdom
- Post town: LONDON
- Postcode district: SW4, SW12 and SW2
- Dialling code: 020
- Police: Metropolitan
- Fire: London
- Ambulance: London
- UK Parliament: Clapham and Brixton Hill
- London Assembly: Lambeth and Southwark

Clapham Park Estate
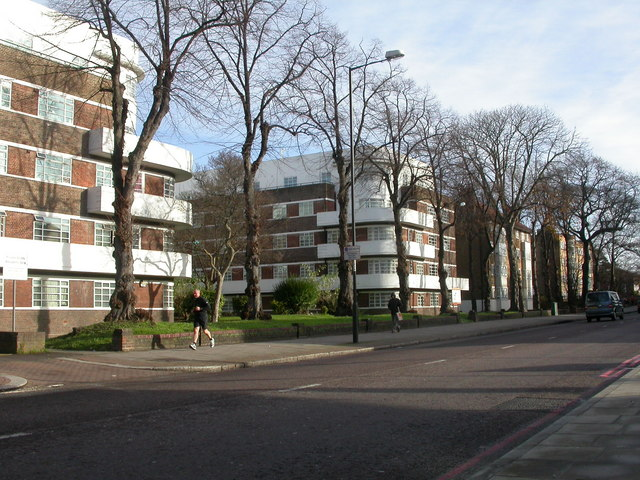
- Oaklands Estate, Clapham Park
- Interactive map of Clapham Park Estate

General information
- Location: Lambeth, London, UK
- Status: under refurbishment
- Area: 229 acres (93 ha)
- No. of units: 1967 (2006)

Construction
- Constructed: 1920s then late 1940s

Refurbishment
- Contractor: Metropolitan Clapham Park
- Directing authority: London Borough of Lambeth

Clapham Park is an area in the Borough of Lambeth in London, to the south of central Clapham and west of Brixton.

== History ==
The original Clapham Park Estate was a speculative development by Thomas Cubitt, who bought 229 acres (0.93 km^{2}) of Bleak Hall Farm in 1825, and marked out plots for building around the new, broad, tree-lined streets of King's Road, Clarence Road, Queen's Road and Atkins Road. (The first three have now been renamed Kings Avenue, Clarence Avenue and Poynders Road respectively). The estate was planned to consist of large detached houses in Cubitt's characteristic Italianate villa style, with each house set in extensive grounds. However, Cubitt's ambitions were never fulfilled, and some plots remained undeveloped at the outbreak of World War I. Cubitt's own residence, Lincoln House, was demolished in 1905, and Rodenhurst Road, a street of large, double-fronted, semi-detached Edwardian houses, was laid out on the site. British statesman Arthur Henderson once lived at number 13 and there is a Blue Plaque on the house indicating this. With the adoption of Poynders Road as the arterial "South Circular" road, this area is now severed from the area further south by traffic, and the streets south of Poynders Road are not generally referred to as being part of Clapham Park.

=== Clapham Park West Estate ===
Following World War II, Oaklands House, Oakfield House, Clarence House, and their associated grounds underwent much development as this area was heavily damaged during the Blitz. The area immediately to the east of the Estate had been developed by the London County Council (LCC) in the 1920s as council housing, mostly in characteristic blocks of neo-Georgian brick flats. After 1945, most of the Cubitt houses were demolished and the northern part of the original area was redeveloped by the LCC in a very different Modern Movement style. On completion of the scheme the Clapham Park Estate became the largest single council estate within the London Borough of Lambeth.

London Borough of Lambeth Council also built tower blocks west of Clarence Avenue, including three tower blocks (Barnsbury, Belgravia and Bloomsbury houses) commemorating Cubitt's more successful developments.

An air raid shelter is still situated within the former grounds of Clarence House, now the Clapham Park West Estate. Some of the undeveloped plots on the southern part of the estate were developed with medium-density terraced and semi-detached houses, but the majority of the grounds associated with Oakfield House were transformed into the Poynders Garden Estate and an open green space now called Agnes Riley Gardens.

=== Metropolitan Clapham Park ===
Metropolitan Clapham Park is an estate, which was owned by Metropolitan Clapham Park, a housing association that was formed to take over the ownership and management of houses on the Clapham Park estate following the stock transfer of the estate from the council to Metropolitan Housing in 2006. The estate is now run by Metropolitan Thames Valley.

Since May 2006, Metropolitan Clapham Park has provided a housing management and maintenance service to Clapham Park tenants who are renting their homes. Clapham Park also offers services to leaseholders, shared ownership schemes, and private residents of the estate.

Formerly known as Clapham Park Homes, the housing association was renamed Metropolitan Clapham Park in April 2012. Metropolitan Clapham Park is a limited company and is managed by a board that is responsible for the organisation. The board is made up of residents, local authority, local councillors, nominees and independent members. All board members serve in a voluntary capacity.

=== New Deals for Communities ===
In February 1999, the Clapham Park area was selected by a borough-wide strategic partnership to be Lambeth's New Deal for Communities (NDC) neighbourhood. A successful bid led to the award of £56 million over a 10-year period, starting in April 2000. Clapham Park Project, a community led project team, was formed to take charge of the NDC programme and transform the lives and prospects of this deprived community.

From 2001, the Clapham Park Project worked with residents and partners to develop a Masterplan to regenerate the Clapham Park area up to. In March 2005, residents voted yes to a stock transfer from Lambeth Council to Clapham Park Homes, which was specifically set up to take over the ownership and management of homes on Clapham Park.

The regeneration programme has been funded in part by the Housing Corporation's Social Housing grant; the NDC grant through Clapham Park Project; and through private loans, a large proportion of which will be paid back through the outright sale of homes, mixed tenures and the balance from rental income.

The programme has so far provided (or is on site to provide) a total of 489 new build properties and 512 refurbished properties.

== "Abbeville Village" ==
From the 1880s the area to the west of Cubitt's land holdings between Clapham Common Southside and the site of Lincoln House was also developed. This area borrowed the name of Clapham Park, presumably because of its original social cachet, and its streets have predominantly remained in owner occupation. The grid of late Victorian era streets around Abbeville Road is frequently referred to by estate agents, such as Orlando Reid, Jacksons estate agents, as "Abbeville Village", although many of the independent local shops that gave the area a distinct character until the 1990s have made way for restaurants, cafes and bars, as the street has become the centre of local night life for the professional middle classes, and shop rentals have increased considerably.

== Agnes Riley Memorial Gardens ==
Frederick George Riley gifted Oakfield House and its grounds to London County Council, on the proviso that it made the site into a public open space with the name 'Agnes Riley Memorial Gardens'. Riley gifted two acres in 1937 and work began immediately to develop these, but World War II intervened and the two acres were used for allotments and occupied by the military. Riley himself remained at Oakfield until his death in 1942. However, in 1952, and against his wishes, Lambeth Council decided to drop the word ‘memorial’ from the name of the small park, which was completed in 1954. The southern part of the park is devoted to a children's playground, paddling pool, and hard games area; the rest is laid out with trees, shrubs, lawns, and an ornamental pond. A park lodge was built but this fell into disrepair and was demolished in 2002.

Since 2005, the Friends of Agnes Riley Gardens (FoARGS) had worked with Lambeth Council to convert the site of the lodge into a community garden. Although the pond is much reduced in size compared to 1938, it and the community garden together form a much-loved local amenity, and residents in the neighbourhood wanted to see it restored to its original state for the benefit of the public. In December 2008, Vernon De Maynard, (Chair – Clapham Park West Residents Association (CPWRA)) contacted Lambeth Parks to find out why the pond and community garden had been allowed to fall into a state of disrepair. He was told that funding issues and other priorities had resulted in these local amenities not being maintained to a satisfactory standard and that he should contact the FoARGS to find out what was happening with the community garden. It transpired that the FoARGS had been working on it since 2005, but due to financial constraints, and other priorities, the community garden had fallen into a state of disrepair. So, in March 2009, Vernon De Maynard discussed the issue with CPWRA and Poynders Garden TRA, and applied to the London Community Foundation for a grant to restore the community garden. In June 2009, a grant was awarded, and this was used to restore the garden.
