= Graham Arader =

American art dealer

Walter Graham Arader III is an American art dealer, focusing on rare maps, prints and natural history watercolors.

== Biography ==
=== Personal life ===
He graduated from Yale University in 1972. He played No. 1 singles on the varsity squash team for three years, and spent much of the rest of his time at Yale exploring the map holdings of the Sterling Memorial Library and the Beinecke Rare Book and Manuscript Library. The curator of the Yale map collection, Alexander O. Vietor, became his mentor. He married Vallijeanne Hartrampf in 1983. His son, Walter Graham Arader IV, is married to British fashion writer Tatiana Hambro.

=== Career ===
Shortly after graduation, he began a short-lived career as a tree surgeon. Two years later, his father, a Philadelphia businessman, former Pennsylvania Secretary of Commerce and map collector, lent his son one hundred and fifty thousand dollars and Arader began to travel the antique-show circuit.

He established his business in 1974, focusing on rare maps. In The Island of Lost Maps, author Miles Harvey credits him with transforming what had been an "insular realm of aficionados," giving maps "unprecedented visibility, not only as investments... but as mass-media artifacts." Arader has brought a similar acumen to the sale of natural history prints, books, and watercolors, and he is the largest dealer of John James Audubon's highly prized double-elephant folio prints from The Birds of America.

In 1981, he introduced the Arader Grading System to determine the value and significance of rare maps, prints, and books. This system evaluates items based on their conceptual importance, aesthetic quality, condition, and rarity. He also invented a method of selling by syndication, a form of retailing with an added touch of gambling. For a fixed amount, clients purchase shares in the distribution of a set of prints or watercolors. By process of lottery, numbers are drawn to determine the order in which clients make a selection. Such a method was used by Arader in the fall of 1985, when he bought the original watercolors for Pierre-Joseph Redouté’s masterpiece, Les Liliacées. Sotheby's had planned to auction the flower watercolors one-by-one, but Arader created one of his syndicates and in a remarkable coup purchased the whole group with a single unchallenged bid of five million dollars. Each of his investors acquired four watercolors for a share price of $63,250. One of Arader's biggest clients was Steve Jobs, who obsessively collected Redouté roses.

He was profiled in the October 24, 2011 issue of Forbes magazine. He is discussed by Sarah Vowell in episode 86 of This American Life, and in her book The Partly Cloudy Patriot, and by Simon Garfield in his book, On The Map.

Arader currently owns galleries in Philadelphia, Pennsylvania, King of Prussia, Pennsylvania, New York City, NY, and St. Helena, California.

== Publications ==
- Arader, W. Graham. Native Grace: Prints of the New World, 1590–1876. West Palm Beach, 1999.
