= Women's Manifesto for Ghana =

The Women's Manifesto for Ghana is a political statement by Ghanaian women demanding rights and equality. The statement was issued in 2004 and continues to influence feminist organizing in Ghana.

== Background ==
The Manifesto came out of increased women's organizing in Ghana, particularly around a Domestic Violence Bill and the 2000 elections. This organizing also coincided with a number of murders of women in Accra, which triggered protests at Osu Castle. Activists also opposed the creation of a Ministry of Women's Affairs, which they believed would ghettoize women's issues.

The mobilizing campaign was supported by NETRIGHT, the Network for Women's Rights in Ghana, and by ABANTU for Development, an NGO founded by African women in Europe. Organizers refused support from donors who wanted to alter the parameters of the campaign.

A meeting was held to convene women from Ghana's 110 districts and discover similarities and differences in women's issues across the country. These meetings generated a long list of cultural practices, such as inequality in marriage and education, that the group wanted to change. Three organizers said in an interview that they were surprised by the group's ability to reach consensus on the goals of the women's movement while drafting the document.

== Themes ==
The manifesto is based on 10 themes to promote gender equality. These themes are as follows:

- Women’s Economic Empowerment
- Women and Land
- Women, Social Policy and Social Development
- Women in Politics, Decision-making and Public Life
- Women, Human Rights and the Law
- Discriminatory Cultural Practices
- Women and Media
- Women, Conflict and Peace
- Women with Special Needs
- Institutions with a Mandate to promote Women’s Rights

== Contents ==
The Manifesto calls for equal female participation in the government of Ghana, demanding that the legislature become 30% female by 2008 and 50% female by 2012. It also stipulates equal female participation in leadership of political parties.

The document also describes everyday conditions for women in Ghana, and demands that the government takes steps to ensure women's human rights by 2010. It demands that the government ensure women's access to safe and effective reproductive health care, including abortions.

The Manifesto recognizes the role of economic inequality in maintaining oppression of women and poor people, and demands a minimum income for all Ghanaians.

The Manifesto describes the special needs and challenges of women with disabilities: difficulty in accessing necessary resources and increased rates of sexual abuse.

== Launch ==
The Women's Manifesto for Ghana was released at the Accra International Conference Centre on 2 September 2004. The document gained wide publicity despite the government's release of a new gender policy on the previous day. The manifesto sought to know and solve the problems that were affecting women.

== Effects ==
The group that created the manifesto called itself The Coalition of the Women's Manifesto. This group remains active in promoting women's rights in Ghana. Since the Manifesto's creation in 2004, the Ghanaian government has passed the Domestic Violence Act, the Human Trafficking Act and the Disability Act, and has banned female genital mutilation. The Coalition, along with NETRIGHT, held demonstrations in 2007 to protest the exclusion of women from Ghana's 50th independence day celebration.

== See also ==
- Women in Ghana
