= Tatiana Hambro =

English fashion writer (born 1989)

- Born: Tatiana Katherine Hambro; 15 October 1989 (age 37); London, England
- Education: Cheltenham Ladies' College; University of Leeds
- Occupations: Fashion writer and editor
- Spouse: Walter Graham Arader IV
- Relatives: Charles Hambro, Baron Hambro (grandfather); Sir Charles Jocelyn Hambro (great-grandfather); Lady Lettice Cotterell (great-grandmother)

Tatiana Katherine Hambro (born 15 October 1989) is an English writer and fashion editor. She worked at British Vogue before joining Moda Operandi as editorial director.

== Early life and family ==
Hambro was born on 15 October 1989 in Westminster, London to The Honourable Charles Edward Hambro and Nicole J. Nicholas. She is a granddaughter of Charles Hambro, Baron Hambro, a banker who served as the senior honorary treasurer of the Conservative Party, and a great-granddaughter of Sir Charles Jocelyn Hambro. She is of Danish, German Jewish, and Greek ancestry, and is a descendant of Baron Carl Joachim Hambro, a Danish banker who founded the Hambros Bank and was ennobled by Frederick VII of Denmark in 1851. Hambro is also a great-granddaughter of Lady Lettice Cotterell, a member of the Bright Young Things and the daughter of William Lygon, 7th Earl Beauchamp. Her family claims royal descent from George Keppel, 3rd Earl of Albemarle and Robert the Bruce.

She was educated at Cheltenham Ladies' College, a private boarding school for girls in Cheltenham. Hambro went on to study literature at the University of Leeds.

== Career ==
Hambro worked as a fashion writer for British Vogue. She left British Vogue to join the editorial team at Moda Operandi, an online luxury fashion retailer, becoming their senior fashion writer. Shortly after, she was promoted to editorial director As director, she oversees editorial features, trunk show reviews, and other content. In 2019 she was the curator of the Council of Fashion Designers of America's December editor guide.

== Personal life ==
She married Walter Graham Arader IV, an American art dealer and son of Walter Graham Arader III, at her family's home in the Cotswolds in 2019. Hambro wore a dress custom-designed by Barbara Tfank and the Lygon family tiara, a diamond tiara from the Victorian era that belongs to her grandmother's family. The religious ceremony took place at St. Peter's Church, an 11th-century Norman church in Dumbleton, near the Hambro family estate.
