= Mercy ffoulkes-Crabbe =

Gold Coast-Ghanaian teacher

Mercy Kwarley ffoulkes-Crabbe, née Quartey-Papafio (6 January 1894 – 14 June 1974) was a Ghanaian teacher, the first indigenous woman to head a school in the Gold Coast. She was also a women's columnist, under the pseudonym Gloria, for the Gold Coast Times.

== Early life and education ==
Mercy Quartey-Papafio was the daughter of Benjamin Quartey-Papafio, the first Gold Coast doctor, and Hannah Maria Duncan of Cape Coast. She was educated at the Wesleyan Methodist school in Cape Coast and at Accra Grammar School, which her father cofounded. At the age of 16, she became the first girl in West Africa to gain a College of Preceptors and Senior Cambridge Certificate. In 1911 she started teaching at Accra Government Girls School, on an annual salary of £25. In 1913 she and her sister Ruby were sent to Saxonholme School in Birkdale, returning to Accra in 1915. She was assistant headmistress at Accra Government Girls School, and for a while acting headmistress.

In 1921 she was appointed headmistress of the Cape Coast Government Girls School. She continued in the post until retirement in 1949, training her teachers after school in preparation for external certificate examination. She was the first in the Gold Coast to introduce a Parent Teacher Association, to improve understanding between parents and teachers. She also introduced evening classes for adult women in Cape Coast, though had to discontinue the initiative after opposition from husbands.

In 1949 she was awarded the MBE. In 1953 she helped Evelyn Amarteifio found the National Federation of Gold Coast Women, and served as its first president.

== Personal life ==
She was married to Edward Atkin Niven Ffoukles-Crabbe and Professor Dorothy Jane Oluman Ffoukles-Crabbe was their daughter.

== Death ==
She died in June 1974, and was buried at the Osu cemetery.
