= ABANTU for Development =

- Formation: 1991; 35 years ago
- Founded at: London, United Kingdom
- Type: INGO
- Purpose: Women's issues
- Headquarters: London, United Kingdom; Nairobi, Kenya; Tanzania
- Region served: Africa
- Affiliations: ECOSOC (special consultative status)

ABANTU for Development is an international women's non-governmental organisation. It seeks to empower African women in the fields of politics and the economy on the local, national, regional and international levels. It pursues these goals by educating through workshops, research, publishing and consultations. ABANTU attracts international attention through its offices in London, where it was founded in 1991 by African women. Its other offices are in Kenya, Tanzania, Ghana, and Nigeria. ABANTU has a special consultative status with the United Nations Economic and Social Council (ECOSOC).

== Organisation ==
An international non-governmental organisation (INGO), ABANTU was founded in 1991 in London by African women, including its future director Wanjiru Kihoro. The name Abantu means "people" in many African languages. Its present-day main offices are in London, United Kingdom; Nairobi, Kenya; and Tanzania. The regional office for West Africa is located in Accra, Ghana (Regional Programme Manager Rose Mensah-Kutin); and there is a branch office in Nigeria. ABANTU is an umbrella organisation for many smaller organisations. It works by formalising pre-existing local and domestic networks of women and turning them into a political force.

ABANTU has a special consultative status with the United Nations Economic and Social Council (ECOSOC). It is also part of Gender Action on Climate Change for Equality and Sustainability. ABANTU has also collaborated with the United Nations Economic Commission for Africa and the Organisation of African Unity.

Although ABANTU maintains links with non-African organisations, its focus is on maintaining indigenous control. Its status in the ECOSOC and central offices in London have contributed to success in attaining donors. In Africa, it is particularly known in the West African region.

== Goals ==
ABANTU pursues to empower African women as decision makers on the local, national, regional and international levels. It seeks to increase women's participation in both politics and the economy, and erase political, legal and cultural barriers to women's equal standing before the law and their economic independence. Mobilizing women to further sustainable development in Africa is also on its agenda. The organisation has identified four areas of key interest: gender and poverty, gender and conflict, gender and governance, and gender and information and communication technologies. Although ABANTU focuses on women, it holds a view that pursuing women's interests is equally beneficial to men.

== Activities ==
ABANTU uses three primary methods to reach its goals: training and capacity building; research, publication and communications; and advocacy, public awareness and networking. ABANTU has more than 500 trainers from its workshops in Africa and the United Kingdom. These trainers conduct gender and policy analysis and host workshops in their countries on themes such as gender stereotypes, social change, climate change and support of HIV-infected workers. ABANTU employs adult learning techniques and recognises that men and women learn differently. In addition to workshops, it organises seminars, forums on public policy and consultations with policy makers and other women's organisations. It has, for instance, produced a manual on taking women into account in budgeting in Africa that was chosen for a trial-run, and participated in the drafting of the Women's Manifesto for Ghana. ABANTU's series of Gender and Poverty Hearings in Eastern and Southern Africa have contributed to transparency of government policies. ABANTU publishes research reports and ABANTU News, a quarterly newsletter on a wide range of topics, such as health practices, sexual assault and women's issues in elections. The organisation also hosts its own radio programme, Gender Forum. ABANTU's research has highlighted the gendered nature of armed conflict, development policy and the effects of climate change.

== See also ==
- List of women's organisations
