= Harold Egbert Allan =

Jamaican politician (1895–1953)

The Right Honourable Sir Harold Allan OBE PC JP
- In office 1935 – 1953 (his death)

Member of Parliament
- Monarchs: Edward VIII; George VI; Elizabeth II
- Succeeded by: Ken Jones
- Constituency: Portland Eastern

Personal details
- Born: Harold Egbert Allan; 15 March 1895; Portland, Colony of Jamaica, British Empire
- Died: 18 February 1953; Kingston, Colony of Jamaica, British Empire
- Political party: Independent
- Spouse: Edris Allan

Sir Harold Egbert Allan OBE PC JP (15 March 1895 – 18 February 1953) was a Jamaican politician, legislator and statesman.

== Early life ==
Allan grew up in Portland Parish. He was educated at Mico College, and after graduating became assistant master at Calabar Elementary School, then headmaster at Titchfield Upper School. In 1919, he founded the Capitol Theatre which was the first place to show motion pictures in the parish.

== Political career ==
Allan was elected a member of the Portland Parochial Board in 1928 and a justice of the peace in 1930. He was then elected to the legislative seat of Portland Eastern in 1935. Following unemployment riots in 1938, he visited the United Kingdom to discuss the financial problems in Jamaica with the British government. The following year, he helped establish the Land Settlement system and Unemployment Relief and Rehabilitation Centre in Kingston's west end. He was a key figure in establishing the Jamaican constitution in 1944.

Though he was politically independent, he worked closely with Jamaican Labour Party (JLP) government leader Sir Alexander Bustamante, and was appointed Minister for Finance and General Purposes in 1945. Two years later, he was appointed representative for Jamaica at the Trade Conference in London.

== Honours and appointments ==
- Allan was named an Officer of the Order of the British Empire in 1943;
- he served as a Privy Councillor from 1942–1944;
- he was dubbed a Knight Bachelor by George VI, becoming the first Afro-Jamaican to receive this honour.

== Death and legacy ==
Allan died on 18 February 1953 in Nuttall Memorial Hospital, Kingston. In 1979, his wife Lady Edris (née Trottman) Allan donated his papers to the Civil Rights leaders collection at the Amistad Research Center in New Orleans, Louisiana. The Center made microfilm copies of his papers, and gave them to the Institute of Jamaica, the Jamaican Archives and the University of the West Indies.
