= Kadijah Amoah =

Ghanaian lawyer and energy executive

- Education: University of Ghana; Saïd Business School, University of Oxford
- Occupations: Lawyer; Business executive
- Employer: Pecan Energies Ghana Limited
- Title: Chief Executive Officer

Kadijah Amoah is a Ghanaian lawyer and energy executive who is the chief executive officer of Pecan Energies Ghana Limited. She previously was chief executive officer of Aker Energy Ghana Limited following her appointment in 2021. Amoah has been described as the first Ghanaian woman to lead an international oil and gas exploration and production company.

== Early life and education ==
Amoah holds bachelor's degrees in political science and sociology and in law from the University of Ghana, together with a postgraduate diploma in legal practice. She later earned a Master of Science in International Business, a postgraduate diploma in strategy and innovation, and an Executive MBA from the Saïd Business School at the University of Oxford.

== Career ==
Amoah began her legal career before joining the international law firm Clifford Chance, where she worked on power, oil and gas financing transactions as part of the banking and capital markets practice.

From 2017 to 2019, she was Head of Investments and Business Development in the Office of the Vice-President of Ghana, where she worked on investment promotion and business reform initiatives. During this period, she also co-led the UK–Ghana Business Council.

=== Aker Energy ===
Amoah joined Aker Energy Ghana Limited as Country Director in February 2020. Her appointment made her the first Ghanaian woman to head the Ghanaian operations of an international oil and gas exploration and production company. She also joined the executive management team of Aker Energy AS, becoming the first black woman on the company's executive management team.

In January 2021, she was promoted to Chief Executive Officer of Aker Energy Ghana Limited. Her appointment was acknowledged by Minority Leader Haruna Iddrisu during International Women's Day commemorations in 2021.

=== Pecan Energies ===
Following the acquisition of Aker Energy Ghana Limited by Africa Finance Corporation in 2023, the company was renamed Pecan Energies Ghana Limited, and Amoah continued as chief executive officer.

During her tenure, the Government of Ghana approved the Plan of Development for the Deepwater Tano Cape Three Points block, allowing the project to proceed to its next phase of development.

At Africa Oil Week in 2025, Amoah called for greater use of African pension funds to support investment in the continent's energy sector.

== Honours and recognition ==
- 2022 – Eisenhower Fellow.
- 2023 – Female Energy Personality of the Year at the Ghana Energy Awards.
- 2026 – Named a Young Global Leader by the World Economic Forum.

== Professional appointments ==
- Member of the Spain–Africa Advisory Council.

== See also ==
- Women in Ghana
