= Dixton Manor =

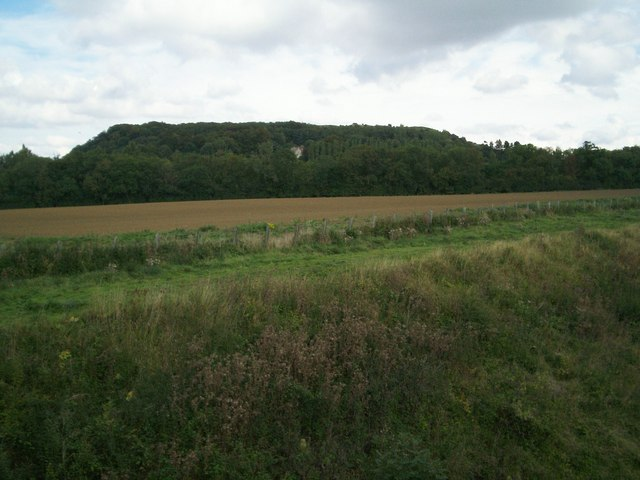
- Part of Dixton Manor is visible between the trees.
- Interactive map of Dixton Manor
- 51°58′22″N 2°01′26″W
- Location: Alderton, Gloucestershire, England

Listed Building – Grade II*
- Designated: 4 July 1960

Dixton Manor is a Grade II*-listed 16th-century manor house in the south of Alderton parish, Gloucestershire, England.

The manor was built for John Higford in 1555. In the nineteenth century, it was acquired by Samuel Gist. In 1962, it was purchased by Charles Hambro, Baron Hambro.

It has been listed Grade II* by English Heritage since 4 July 1960.
