= Rose Mensah-Kutin =

Ghanaian gender advocate and journalist

Dr Rose Mensah-Kutin
- Born: November 22, 1955 (age 70); Brofoyedru, Ghana
- Occupations: Activist, professional journalist

Dr Rose Mensah-Kutin (born 22 November 1955) is a Ghanaian gender advocate and professional journalist. As of October 2016, she is the West Africa Regional director for ABANTU for Development.

== Early life ==
She was born and raised in Brofoyedru, a town in the Adansi South district of the Ashanti region of Ghana, to a cocoa and coffee farmer.

== Education ==
Dr Mensah-Kutin was once a student of Brofoyedru Middle and United Methodist Middle Schools. She completed Accra Girls Secondary School and later went to Aggrey Memorial Zion Secondary School for her sixth-form education. She completed a bachelor's degree in English and History 1978 at University of Ghana and returned to do master's degree in Mass Communication from the same university in the following year. She holds a second master's degree from the Institute of Social Studies, The Hague, and a PhD in Gender and Energy Studies from the University of Birmingham, UK.

== Career ==
Earlier on in her career, she worked as an assistant editor for Daily Graphic in Ghana shortly after she co-founded Network for Women’s Rights in Ghana in 1999. She was one time Social Impact Assessment officer at Ghana's Ministry of Mines and Energy. She sits on the boards of The Netherlands-based International Gender and Energy Network (ENERGIA) and African Women Development Fund in Accra, Ghana. She is currently the West Africa Regional director for ABANTU for Development, an international non-governmental organisation that empowers women by giving leadership training in sustainable development.

== Personal life ==
She is married to Professor Kwame Karikari with four children.
