= Benjamin Quartey-Papafio =

Gold Coast physician and politician

Benjamin Quartey-Papafio MRCS (Lond)
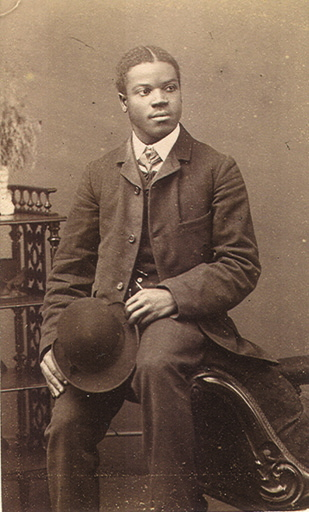
- Quartey-Papafio, c. 1878 – c. 1894
- Born: Benjamin William Quarteyquaye Quartey-Papafio; 25 June 1859; Accra, Gold Coast
- Died: 14 September 1924 (aged 65); Accra, Gold Coast
- Education: CMS Grammar School; Fourah Bay College; Durham University (B.A.); University of Edinburgh (MBChB, MD)
- Occupations: Physician; politician

Benjamin William Quarteyquaye Quartey-Papafio, MRCS (Lond) (25 June 1859 – 14 September 1924) was a physician pioneer and politician on the Gold Coast - the first Ghanaian to obtain the medical degree (M.D) and the first to practise as an orthodox-trained physician.

== Life ==
Benjamin Quartey-Papafio was born into a leading Accra family: his parents were Akwashotse Chief William Quartey-Papafio, also known as Nii Kwatei-Kojo or "Old Papafio", and Momo Omedru, a businesswoman from Gbese (Dutch Accra) and Amanokrom Akuapem.

Quartey-Papafio was educated at the CMS Grammar School and Fourah Bay College in Freetown, Sierra Leone, before travelling to study in Britain. Gaining a B.A. degree from Durham University, he enrolled as a medical student at St Bartholomew's Hospital Medical College in 1882 before shortly relocating to Edinburgh University. He graduated from Edinburgh with the degree M.B. and M.Ch. in 1886 and became a member of the Royal College of Surgeons. In 1896, he earned a postgraduate research medical doctorate (MD) from Edinburgh after completing a dissertation titled, "Malarial haemoglobinuric fever, (so-called) Blackwater Fever of the Gold coast: chiefly from a clinico-pathological standpoint, with illustrative cases."

His brother, Emmanuel William Kwate Quartey-Papafio (1857–1928) was an agriculturist and a trader. Another brother, Arthur Boi Quartey-Papafio (1869–1927) studied at Accra's Wesleyan High School, then to Fourah Bay College before reading law at Christ College, Cambridge and in 1897, he was called to the Bar at Lincoln's Inn, London. He opened his own chambers in Accra and wrote extensively on the history of Accra and customary laws of the Ga people. From 1905 to 1909, he was a member of the Accra Town Council and the co-founding treasurer of the National Congress of British West Africa. He also co-edited the newspaper, the Gold Coast Advocate. Two other members of the Quartey-Papafio family, Clement W. Quartey-Papafio (1882–1938) and Hugh Quartey-Papafio (1890–1959) (children of Emmanuel William Kwate Quartey-Papafio) also became barristers and were active in Accra high society.

He was the first African from the Gold Coast to receive a medical degree and subsequently work in the Gold Coast.

Returning to the Gold Coast, he was a medical officer for the Gold Coast Government Service from 1888 until 1905, but was consistently denied promotion to the rank of Medical Officer. Undeterred, he switched to private practice, setting up a practice on High Street in Accra, with the slogan Domi Abra (a phrase that translated from Twi as "If you love me, come") emblazoned above the door.

Quartey-Papafio had three children by Hannah Maria Ekua Duncan, of a Cape Coast/Elmina family; on 8 October 1896 at St Bartholomew-the-Great Church in Smithfield, London, he married Eliza Sabina Meyer, daughter of Richard Meyer of Accra, and the couple had six children. A member of the Accra Town Council from 1909 to 1912, Quartey-Papafio was a member of the 1911 deputation to London that protested the Forest Bill. He was an unofficial member of the Legislative Council from 1919 to 1924. He was a practising Anglican.

== Family ==
Quartey-Papafio's son and five daughters were educated in Britain: Mercy (Ffoulkes-Crabbe), Ruby (Quartey-Papafio) and Grace (Nelson) became teachers in the Gold Coast. His son, Percy, trained as a doctor but was unable to practise due to failing eyesight caused by cataracts. Dr B. W. Quartey-Papafio, Nene Sir Emmanuel Mate Kole, KBE (Konor of Manya Krobo), Dr F. V. Nanka-Bruce, Hon. Sir Thomas Hutton-Mills, along with Nana Sir Ofori Atta (Omanhene of Akim Abuakwa), Nana Amonoo, F. J. P. Brown of Cape Coast, J. Ephraim Casely-Hayford of Sekondi were founded Achimota College. Dr Ruby was an economist and a Headmistress at Accra Girls High School. In addition to ghost-writing and being of assistance to the late Kwame Nkrumah and his cohorts/co-nationalists actualization of Ghana's independence, she was also appointed as the first Ghanaian headmistress at Cape Coast Government Girls School. After achieving the fellowship of the Royal College of Surgeons, her only child Nana Ffoulkes Crabbe-Johnson followed in her footsteps, becoming the first Ghanaian Professor and Head of Department in Anaesthesiology (Lagos University Teaching Hospital) in a foreign medical institution and President of the West African College of Surgeons.
