= Wanjiru Kihoro =

Kenyan economist and writer

Wanjirū Kìhoro
- Born: Grace Wanjirū Kìhoro; September 9, 1953; Kenya
- Died: October 12, 2006 (aged 53); Nairobi, Kenya
- Burial place: Nyeri, Kenya
- Citizenship: Kenya
- Education: Bachelor's in Economics; MA, PhD in Development Studies
- Alma mater: Columbia University; University of Leeds
- Occupations: Economist; Writer; Feminist; Activist
- Years active: 1982 - 2003
- Organizations: The Africa Centre; All African Conference of Churches; National Christian Council of Kenya; United Church Board for World Ministries
- Known for: Founder of Akina Mama wa Afrika; Committee for the Release of Political Prisoners in Kenya; ABANTU for Development
- Notable work: Kenya News
- Spouse: Wanyiri Kihoro
- Children: Wangui; Pambana; Amandla; Wairimu

Wanjirū Kìhoro (9 September 1953 – 12 October 2006) was an economist, writer and feminist activist from Kenya. She was one of the founders of the pan-African women's organisation Akina Mama wa Afrika (AMwA) and the for the Release of Political Prisoners in Kenya (CRPPK), to protest the incarceration of Kenyans during Daniel arap Moi's regime.

== Education and career ==
Kìhoro graduated in economics from Columbia University, New York. She went on to complete an MA in development studies and a PhD at Leeds University during her working life in the late 1980s.

In 1982, Kìhoro and her husband settled in London on exile from Kenya, at a time when Moi's arrests of dissidents had intensified, particularly of lawyers and academics. This is when she helped found the Committee for the Release of Political Prisoners in Kenya (CRPPK). With other activists, Kihoro produced and wrote for Kenya News, which was then investigated by Moi's government. She began work for The Africa Centre, London in 1984. Other work involved the All African Conference of Churches, the National Christian Council of Kenya and the United Church Board for World Ministries.

In 1985, she co-founded Akina Mama wa Afrika as a community-based organisation for African women. In 1992, she helped found ABANTU for Development to train African women for positions of leadership. ABANTU was set up in Nairobi, Kenya, with subsequent offices set up in Nigeria and Ghana.

She returned to Kenya with her family when the new Kibaki government came to power in 2002.

== Death ==
She died in 2006 after four years spent in a coma after a plane crash. During these four years, Kìhoro's situation was contrasted with that of Terri Schiavo, with Kìhoro's husband Wanyiri Kihoro and the rest of her family unanimous in believing she should continue to be on life support at Nairobi's Kenyatta National Hospital. At the time of her death, she was survived by her husband, and four children: Wangūi, Pambana, Amandla and Wairimū.

On her death, The Guardian commented that there were "few African women as well known as Wanjirū Kìhoro". Wangui wa Goro wrote in Pambazuka News: "[S]he was a leader, activist for democracy, freedom, human rights, equality and justice and always stood on the side of the oppressed, particularly women and the poor. She worked tirelessly and with courage, using her razor-sharp intellect to focus thousands, of the task at hand in creative ways which brought her knowledge and everyday life together in very practical ways."
