= Molly, Lady Huggins =

British activist and philanthropist

- Born: Molly Green; 1907; Singapore, Straits Settlements
- Died: 11 September 1981 (aged 73–74)
- Spouse: Sir John Huggins (1929 – ?)
- Children: 3, including Cherry Hambro

Molly, Lady Huggins, née Green (1907 – 11 September 1981) was a British activist and philanthropist.

== Life ==
Molly Huggins was born Molly Green in Singapore in 1907, the daughter of a colonial resident in Malaya. Partly brought up by maiden aunts in Scotland, she was educated at Roedean School. Early in her career, Huggins worked as a secretary for a doctor in London. She had 'great fun' breaking the General Strike of 1926, and had several relationships before marrying Sir John Huggins, sixteen years her senior, in Kuala Lumpur in 1929. The couple had three daughters, including the fashion journalist Cherry Hambro.

Her husband had colonial postings to Malaya, Singapore, Trinidad and Washington. During her time in Trinidad, when her husband was colonial secretary, Huggins organized Women's Volunteer Services. She also was active in the Red Cross during World War II. In 1943 John Huggins was appointed Governor of Jamaica. While in Jamaica, 'Lady Molly' established the Jamaica Federation of Women. She also played golf and tennis, joining with a friend to win the Jamaican ladies' doubles championship in 1947.

On their return to England in 1950 she became active in Conservative Party politics, standing unsuccessfully as the Unionist Party candidate for West Dunbartonshire in the 1955 general election. Her political fortunes were not helped by the failure of her marriage. She continued party involvement as deputy chairman of the Conservative Commonwealth Council, and Chairman of his West Indies Group. In the 1950s, Huggins also set up the Metropolitan Coloured People's Housing Association – later renamed the Metropolitan Housing Trust – to improve the quality of accommodation for London's Caribbean community. She published a book of memoirs, Too Much to Tell, in 1967.

== Works ==
- Too Much to Tell. London: Heinemann, 1967.
