= Metropolitan Thames Valley =

UK Housing Association

Metropolitan Thames Valley, formed from the merger of Metropolitan Housing Trust and Thames Valley Housing Association in 2018, is a housing association (HA) in the United Kingdom with origins back to the 1950s. The Trust manages nearly 38,000 homes and is based in Southgate, London. Metropolitan is a member of the National Housing Federation and of the G15 group comprising London’s largest housing associations.

Under the leadership of chief executive Mel Barrett, MTV manages around 57,000 homes across London, the East Midlands, Eastern England and South East England. Paula Kahn, who chaired the Metropolitan Housing board from 2013 onwards, became chair of MTV. In 2018 the merged housing association aimed to build 2,000 new homes per year.

== History ==
=== Metropolitan Housing Trust ===
Metropolitan Housing Trust, operating as Metropolitan, has its origins in the 1950s when Lady Molly Huggins established the Metropolitan Coloured People’s Housing Association to provide good quality, affordable housing for immigrants from the Caribbean. In 1963 Metropolitan was formally established as a Housing Association.

=== Thames Valley Housing Association ===
Thames Valley Housing Association
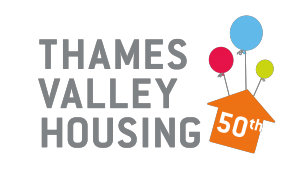
- Founded: February 17, 1966
- Purpose: Social housing
- Location: Twickenham
- Key people: Geeta Nanda CEO
- Employees: over 200
- Website: www.tvha.co.uk

The Thames Valley Housing Association (also Thames Valley housing) was a medium-sized housing association based in Twickenham, South West London, which owned or managed around 15,000 homes at the time of the merger. These included traditional rented housing, shared ownership, and key worker and student accommodations.

Thames Valley was founded in 1966 and began its first building project in 1968.

In 2015 plans were announced for Thames Valley to merge with the Genesis Housing Association to form Genesis Thames Valley. The unified organization was to build around 3,000 homes per year, of which around 1,800 would be affordable housing. However the merger was put on hold in July of that year by Nationwide Building Society, and eventually the plan fell through. Had the merger been completed, the combined organisation would have represented 47,000 homes.

==== Management ====
Thames Valley Housing's executive team consisted of:

- Geeta Nanda - CEO.
- John Baldwin - Director of Housing and Neighbourhood Services
- Jane Long - Interim Corporate Services Director
- Guy Burnett - Group Development Director
- Julian Turner - Finance Director

== Size (turnover) ==
Prior to the merger, MHT had a gross turnover of £266m in 2017, while TVH had a gross turnover of £106m a year. This was an increase of 11% from the previous year, with both sales income and capital expenditure increasing over the period. According to its annual report, MHT had a surplus after tax in 2017 of £80m.

== Fizzy ==
Fizzy Living, founded in February 2012, is the rental arm of MTV. The venture received private capital from the Macquarie Group of Australia.

== Controversies ==
In 2018, Metropolitan lost a legal case at the Court of Appeal against two tenants in the East Midlands whom it had sought to evict after they complained about anti-social behaviour in their area.

In March 2018, the Guardian reported that housing associations including Metropolitan had made millions of pounds from buying land from the Ministry of Defence, applying for planning permission and then reselling the land.

Inside Housing reported that Metropolitan Housing had a gender pay gap almost 6% above the national average in 2016/17.

== Awards ==
- Fizzy - 2013 RESI Newcomer of the Year award
- Thames Valley Housing - 2013 National Housing Award’s Best Small Development award
- Thames Valley Housing - 2015 Love Your Community award
- Thames Valley Housing - 2015 WhatHouse? Best Start Home Scheme award
- Thames Valley Housing - 2016 Top 60: Build to rent development of the year
