= Kate Quartey-Papafio =

Ghanaian industrialist

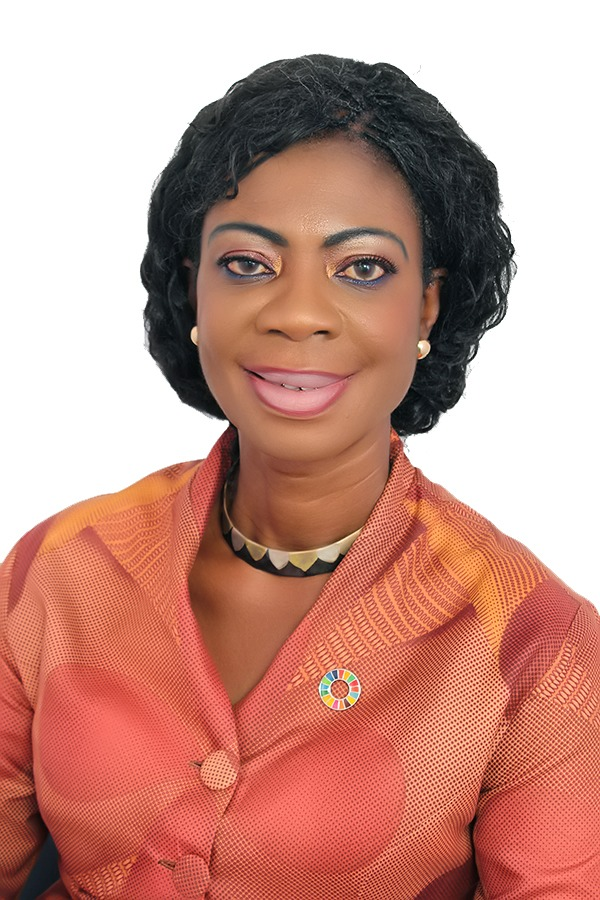
- Born: Kate Quartey-Papafio; Ghana
- Occupations: Founder and Chief Executive Officer
- Organization(s): Reroy Group (Reroy Cables Limited, Reroy Power Limited, Reroy Metals Limited, Reroy Energy Limited)
- Website: Official Website

Kate Quartey-Papafio is a Ghanaian industrialist and the founder and chief executive officer of cable manufacturing company the Reroy Cables Limited and the now Reroy Group of Companies. She is one of the first women in Africa to establish a cable manufacturing business.

== Career ==
Quartey-Papafio started Reroy Cables with her husband in 1992 after they failed to acquire suitable cables for the construction of their house, becoming the first female CEO of a cable manufacturing firm in ECOWAS. In 2014, she was named Marketing Woman of the Year by the Chartered Institute of Marketing Ghana (CIMG). In the same year, during the maiden edition of the Osagyefo Kwame Nkrumah African Genius Award, she won the entrepreneurship category. In December 2023, the President of Ghana Nana Akufo-Addo presented her with the Legacy and GADIA State award for her leadership in business and entrepreneurship spunning over 27 years.

She has been able to transform to the Reroy Group of Companies consisting of Reroy Cables the first company they formed which manufactures power cables and conductors, Reroy Power manufacturers, supplier and installers of power distribution equipments, Reroy Energy construction and operation of power and solar plants and Reroy Metals manufacturers of aluminium wire rods.

She is currently the sector Chairperson of Electricals and Electronics Committee of the Association of Ghana Industries (AGI).

She was featured by the CNN Marketplace Africa for being the "Queen of Cables in Ghana. In 2017, Quartey-Papafio was named in a prosecution related to the collapse of now defunct Capital Bank. After four years of legal proceedings, the Accra High Court, acquitted and discharged her in July 2021, ruling that the prosecution had failed to establish a prima facie case. The court emphasized that she had acted without criminal intent, and she was cleared of all charges.

== Awards and recognition ==
- Marketing Woman of the Year – CIMG (2013).
- Ernst & Young West Africa Entrepreneur of the Year (2013).
- Africa's Most Influential Woman in Business & Government – CEO Communications, South Africa.
- Business Woman of the Year – Ghana Economic Forum
- Manufacturing Company of the Year Reroy Cables Limited – CIMG National Marketing Awards.
- CNN Marketplace Africa — "Queen of Cables in Africa"
- Energy Personality of the Year (2017).
- Legacy and Heads of State Achievers Award (2023)

== Companies ==
- Reroy Cables Limited (Manufacture of Power Cables and Conductors)
- Reroy Power Limited (Manufacture, Supply and Installation of Power Distribution Equipment; Transformers and Substations)
- Reroy Metals Limited (Manufacture of Aluminium Wire Rod)
- Reroy Energy Limited (Construction and Operation of CCGT Power and Solar Plants)

== Philanthropic works ==
She is the co-founder of the Dr J.B. Quartey-Papafio Medical Foundation which refurbished three side wards of the Ward 2 of the Department of Surgery Department of the Korle-Bu Teaching Hospital.
