= Evelyn Amarteifio =

Ghanaian women's organiser

Dr. Evelyn Mansa Amarteifio (1916-1997) was a Ghanaian women's organiser. In 1953 she established the National Federation of Gold Coast Women (NFGCW).

== Early life and education ==
Evelyn Amarteifio was born on May 22, 1916, in Accra. Her parents, two of her sisters, and some of her aunts were involved in social and voluntary work in the 1920s and 1930s. She studied at Accra Girls School and Achimota College. In 1937 she became a teacher at the Achimota Primary School, and continued to pursue voluntary work.

In early 1953 Amarteifio travelled to Britain to study with the YWCA. On her return – together with Annie Jiagge, Thyra Casely-Hayford, Amanua Korsah and others – she established a YWCA in the Gold Coast. She also travelled to the United States, where she learned about the Jamaican Federation of Women. She used this as a model for the National Federation of Gold Coast Women, a non-governmental national women's organization.

In 1960, when it hosted the Conference for Women of Africa and African Descent,

After independence Amarteifio could not protect the federation from Kwame Nkrumah's desire to control women's organizations, and in 1960 the NFGCW was dissolved.

== Death ==
Amarteifio died on July 6, 1997.
