= Jamaica Federation of Women =

The Jamaica Federation of Women (JFW) is a Jamaican women's organization. Established in 1944, it was the first island-wide women's organization.

== History ==
The JFW was founded by Lady Molly Huggins, who had come to Jamaica in 1943 as the wife of the Governor of Jamaica, John Huggins. Other founder-members included Rose Leon and Mary Morris Knibb. The federation drew on a legacy of pro-imperial white-dominated conservative women's associations, active in Jamaica from the late 19th century, and on the Women's Institutes of Great Britain. Its executive committee included representatives of the Women's Liberal Club, the Women's Social Service Association and the Jamaica Women's League.

The JFW neutralized more Afro-centric feminism in Jamaica. It attracted a large membership, including poor rural women: by 1948 there were 30,000 members. After Lady Huggins left in 1950, local leadership took over.

Papers relating to the JFW's history are held at the National Library of Jamaica.

== Current activities ==
The Jamaica Federation of Women celebrated its 70th anniversary in 2014. "Today the JFW still represents a broad-based organization, with a wide network of rural branches, a leadership of elite, largely urban women, and a home-maker orientation".
