= Ghana Economic Forum =

- Status: Active
- Genre: Conference
- Frequency: Annually
- Location: Various
- Inaugurated: 2011; 15 years ago
- Most recent: September 4–5, 2018
- Organizer: Business & Financial Times
- Website: ghanaeconomicforum.com

Ghana Economic Forum (GEF) is a two-day forum focused on discussions pertaining to issues around the Ghanaian economy. The forum which started about 6 years ago (2012) is organised by the Business & Financial Times and was endorsed in 2017 by the government of Ghana as part of Ghana’s 60th Independence celebrations.

== Annual meeting ==
The forum has been organised annually since 2017, and is organised at a different location each year. The themes of the conference also varies annually and are carved to reflect the current economic trends of the country.

Year	Date	Theme
2012	3 May	Integrating people, systems and technologies for sustainable economic development
2013	12 March	The Role of Leadership in Driving National Economic Prosperity
2014		
2015		Ghanaian-owned economy – Setting the Agenda and Achieving It
2016	17 - 18 Aug	The Ghanaian Owned Economy: Setting the Agenda for Achieving it
2017	7 - 8 Aug	Building a Ghanaian-Owned Economy, 60 Years after Independence
2018	4 - 5 Sep	Building a competitive economy for sustainable growth

=== List of notable speakers ===
- Yaw Osafo-Marfo (Senior Minister, Ghana)
- Kwesi Amissah-Arthur (Former Vice President, Ghana)
- Mahamudu Bawumia (Vice President, Ghana)
