= John Huggins (colonial administrator) =

Sir John Huggins

Sir John Huggins GCMG MC (1891–1971) was a British colonial administrator in Penang and subsequently Trinidad. He was Governor of Jamaica from 1943 to 1951.

He married Molly Green and they had three daughters. His second daughter, Cherry, became Lady Hambro.

He was progressively promoted within the Order of St Michael and St George, from Companion (CMG, 8 June 1939), to Knight Commander (KCMG, before 1946), to Knight Grand Cross (GCMG, 9 June 1949).
