= Trade unions in Ghana =

- National organization(s): TUC, GFL
- Regulatory authority: Ministry of Employment and Labour Relations
- Total union membership: 800,000
- Density: 7.5% (all workers); 48% (waged workers)

Global Rights Index
- 3 Regular violations of rights

International Labour Organization
- Ghana is a member of the ILO

Convention ratification
- Freedom of Association: 2 June 1965
- Right to Organise: 2 July 1959

Trade unions in Ghana first emerged in the 1920s and have played an important role in the country's economy and politics ever since.

== Pre-independence ==
The first industrial action in Ghana - at the time still the British colony Gold Coast - was a strike by the country's miners in 1919. This led to a series of successful collective actions by workers. Permanent organizations were formed as well. Unions like the Gold and Silver Smith's Association, the Colony and Ashanti Motor Union, and the Carpenters and Masons Union were all founded in the 1920s. The colonial government reacted by outlawing strikes.

In 1941, the Trade Union Ordinance of 1941 was enacted, legalizing the formation of trade unions in the colony. The British government encouraged the establishment of a national trade union center as it sought to avoid the kind of labor struggles that had accompanied the Industrial Revolution in Europe and North America. On September 8, 1945 the Gold Coast Trades Union Congress (TUC) was founded with an initial membership of 6,030 and fourteen affiliates at the offices of the Railway African Employees Union in Sekondi. It was largely an appendage of the ruling Convention People's Party (CPP).

The struggle for better working conditions was soon coupled with calls for independence. After the Big Six, several pro-independence politicians, were arrested in 1948, the TUC called for a nationwide strike, which led to the release of the politicians, but also weakened the federation.

In 1954, the TUC launched an attempt to re-group and re-organize along industrial lines as well as a campaign to make the public aware of this move. This change was met with opposition by the union of the United Africa Company, partially the result of communist influence.

== First Republic ==
By the time Ghana became independent in 1957 - leading the Gold Coast Trades Union Congress to become the Trades Union Congress of Ghana - there were splinter labor groups in all regions of the country. Many were much more militant than the TUC and violent demonstrations and strikes were no rarity in Ghana. Employers responded by creating yellow unions. In 1958, the Ghanaian government responded as well by passing the Industrial Relations Act of 1958 in order to strengthen the TUC.

It not only gave legal recognition to the TUC - the only national center to receive recognition - for the first time and even provided it with buildings for headquarters for its unions, but also made collective bargaining compulsory. The Industrial Relations Act of 1965, which replaced that of 1958, forced anyone wishing to register a trade union to do so via the TUC, a move many considered to contravene the ILO Convention No. 87. In 1960, a law making union membership compulsory for civil servants followed. At the time the TUC's relations to the CPP were very close, sometimes at the cost of its autonomy, leading to some resentment among the workers.

== NLC, Second Republic, and NRC ==
In 1966, the military overthrow of the CPP government was welcomed by many workers discontent with the TUC's loyalty to the government. The new government's repeal of compulsory TUC membership for civil servants led the TUC to shrink from 700,000 to 300,000 members. The years between 1966 and 1969 saw a large number of unauthorized strikes. Relations between the TUC and the National Liberation Council government were also rocky. In 1967, a government-appointed commission recommended an increase in wages, which was then implemented by the government.

In 1969, Kofi Abrefa Busia came to power replacing the military government. He expressed his support for the "existence of a free and independent labour movement" and promised the TUC he would help it in gaining power. Following heavy inflation, the TUC called on the Busia administration to raise salaries. Although it created a Salary Review Commission, the government did not implement the union's proposal.

The Busia government introduced the development levy, a new tax on all workers. These moves angered the country's workers and the TUC. Heavy criticism of the administration by the unions led it to amend the 1958 Industrial Relations Act in September 1971. The new Industrial Relations Act of 1971 dissolved the TUC and froze all of its assets. The dissolution did not, however, last long. Following a coup led by Ignatius Kutu Acheampong, the National Redemption Council military government repealed the 1971 act and restored the TUC in February 1972.

== PNDC and democratic rule ==
After the Provisional National Defence Council (PNDC) came to power through a coup in 1981, it sought cooperation with the TUC, but failed to receive its full support. In 1982, it issued a decree for the formation of the People's/Workers' Defence Committees (PWDC) parallel to the existing union structures and in order to undermine the unions' power. The same year, several workers calling themselves the Association of Labour Unions (ALU) backed by the government attacked the TUC headquarters and set up Interim Management Committees as heads of both the TUC and the trade unions within it to democratize them. From there on, relations between the government and the TUC were poor.

After the return to democratic rule in Ghana in 1992, conditions for trade unions improved. Although the 1965 Industrial Relations Act requires TUC affiliation for the registration of a union, workers' association (formally not unions) in the public sector were formed. These have some negotiating power with the government, but are not allowed to call out strikes. In 1985, the TUC and several public sector workers' associations founded the National Consultive Forum of Ghana Labour (NFGL). It does negotiate on behalf of its members, but provides a means of communication for the member organizations.

In 1999, the Ghana Federation of Labour (GFL) was established as an umbrella organization for several independent trade unions. In 2003 a tripartite National Labour Commission was created to help resolve disputes. It also assumed responsibility for issuing bargaining certificates for unions seeking to establish collective bargaining agreements.
