= Kodwo Addison =

Ghanaian political activist

- Born: Charles Afful Addison; 5 May 1927; Gold Coast
- Died: 1985 (aged 57–58); Accra, Ghana
- Occupations: Political activist, political operative
- Years active: 1954-1966

Kodwo Addison (1927–1985), sometimes referred to as "Kojo", was a Ghanaian political activist, political operative and trade unionist connected with the rule of Kwame Nkrumah.

== Early life and education ==
Addison was born on 23 May 1927 in Cape Coast Metropolitan Assembly, in central Ghana, the youngest of three children born to Charles Addison and Dorothy Crabbe. He completed his elementary education in 1944 and entered the School of Architecture at the Cape Coast Technical Institute, graduating in 1947 with a diploma in draftsmanship. After graduation, he moved to the nation's capitol, Accra. At the time, the Soviet Union was expanding into Ghana, economically and ideologically, and Addison became indoctrinated. He became a fervent communist; in 1965, he traveled to Moscow for the 150th Anniversary of the founding of the International Workingmen's Association and delivered a speech, in which he stated: "Just as Leninism is Marxism in the period of imperialism, Nkrumaism is Marxism in the era of neo-colonialism. We embrace scientific socialism and fully agree with Marxism-Leninism."

== Career ==
In 1953, he was given a scholarship to study political economy in Hungary which, at the time, was a communist state and satellite state of the Soviet Union. He returned to Ghana in the summer of 1954, sporting a Lenin-style beard. He was immediately made Secretary General of the Ghana Maritime Workers' Union. When that union merged with five others to form the Maritime and Dockworkers' Union in 1956, Addison was ousted. With the help of John Tettegah, Secretary-General of the All-African Trade Union Federation, he was named principal of the Ghana Labour College; by 1960, he was Director of Political and Social Affairs in the Ghana Trades Union Congress. Also in 1960, he was appointed Administrative Secretary of the All-African Peoples' Conference, and worked as a "news consultant" (censor) at Radio Ghana. By now, he was also a member of the Marxist wing of the ruling Convention People's Party (CPP), an Honorary President of the Ghana-USSR Friendship Society, and a trusted aide of Ghana's president, Kwame Nkrumah.

In 1961, Nkrumah appointed Addison Director of the Kwame Nkrumah Ideological Institute. During his tenure, Addison was named a member of the three-man Presidential Commission, which would act for Nkrumah should he be incapacitated (Addison was expelled from the commission in 1965). He became a member of the Central Committee of the CPP concerned with organizational and ideological work, chairman of the CPP Education Committee, member of the Board of Directors of the Ghana Broadcasting Corporation, member of the Board of Directors of Ghana's most widely-read daily newspaper, the Daily Graphic, member of a Committee to Review Pre-University Education, and assistant to the Director of Press and Radio. With each of these positions, Addison consolidated his control over Ghana's information and education systems.

In the 1965 Ghanaian parliamentary election, in which only CPP members were allowed to run, Addison was elected as Member of Parliament for the Ateiku constituency in the Central Region of Ghana. Nkrumah's regime was toppled by military coup on February 24, 1966. The institute immediately collapsed and parliament was dissolved, leaving Addison unemployed.

With his party gone, and his affiliation with the country's leadership finished, Addison appears to have gone underground. He had been accused of sexual assault by at least one woman and had been arrested when the institute closed. In 1972, he publicly supported the military head of state, Ignatius Kutu Acheampong, however he may have been in hiding or in prison—that year, he arranged for his friend, the journalist Kofi Batsa, to act on his behalf and ask the KGB's Resident in Ghana for financial assistance to be sent to his wife.

== Personal life and death ==
Addison married Charlotte Addison on 17 September 1956. His second wife was Ekua Bentil (d. 1991). At the time of the 1979 June 4th uprising, Addison and Bentil were running a store in Agona Swedru. On June 7th, soldiers targeted the couple. Addison was not attacked; instead, they publicly and brutally sexually assaulted Bentil, permanently maiming her. The couple returned to Accra, where Addison is believed to have died in 1985, age 58.
