= Railway Workers' Union =

The Railway Workers' Union is the name of:

- General Railway Workers' Union, former trade union in the United Kingdom
- Indonesian Railways Workers' Union, trade union in Indonesia
- Korean Railway Workers' Union, trade union in South Korea
- National Railway Workers' Union, trade union in Japan
- Railway Workers' Union (Austria), former trade union in Austria
- Railway Workers' Union (Finland), former trade union in Finland
- Railway Workers' Union (Ghana), trade union Ghana
- Railway Workers Union (Iraq), former trade union in Iraq
- Railway Workers' Union (Pakistan), trade union in Pakistan
- Rhodesian Railway Workers' Union, former trade union in Rhodesia
