= Kodwo =

Kodwo is a given name. Notable people with the name include:

- Kodwo Addison (1927–1985), Ghanaian politician and trade unionist
- Kodwo Sam Annan, Ghanaian politician
- Kodwo Eshun (born 1967), British-Ghanaian writer, theorist, and filmmaker
