= Kwaw Ampah =

Ghanaian trade unionist and politician

Member of the Ghana Parliament for Juabeso-Bia
- In office 1965–1966
- Preceded by: New
- Succeeded by: Constituency abolished

Personal details
- Born: Joseph Kwaw Ampah Gold Coast
- Party: Convention People's Party
- Occupation: Trade Unionist

Kwaw Ampah also known by the name Joseph Kwaw Ampah was a Ghanaian trade unionist and politician. He was appointed secretary general (national secretary) of the Trade Union Congress (TUC) by the then Convention People's Party government in June 1964 replacing Magnus George. Prior to his appointment, he was the secretary of the Public Utility Workers' Union. In 1965 he together with other trade unionists including John Tettegah who was then the All-African Trade Union Federation secretary general became members of parliament representing the Convention People's Party. Kwaw Ampah served as the member of parliament for the Juabeso-Bia constituency from 1965 until 1966 when the Nkrumah government was overthrown. He held this office while serving as secretary general of the TUC.

== See also ==
- List of MPs elected in the 1965 Ghanaian parliamentary election
