= Teachers' and Educational Workers' Union =

Ghanaian trade union

The Teachers' and Educational Workers' Union (TEWU) is a trade union representing workers in the education sector in Ghana.

The union was founded in 1962, in response to the departure of most of the teachers in the Ghana Union of Teachers and Union of Teachers and Cultural Services, to form the Ghana National Association of Teachers (GNAT). The GNAT was registered as a voluntary association of all teachers, while those who wished to remain part of a trade union could join the new TEWU, an affiliate of the Ghana Trade Union Congress. It had 40,000 members by 1985, and 60,000 in 2018.
