= Ghana–United States Status of Forces Agreement =

2018 proposal

The Ghana–United States Status of Forces Agreement was a proposal made by the United States Department of Defense to the government of Ghana in 2018. Despite historical cooperation between Ghana and the United States, the proposal was controversial due to concerns (raised primarily by Ghana's National Democratic Congress party) that the agreement would offer undue privileges to the United States, including a particularly controversial section allowing the construction of a United States military base in Ghana. Ghana's President Nana Akufo-Addo, has denied the agreement includes permission to build a military base.

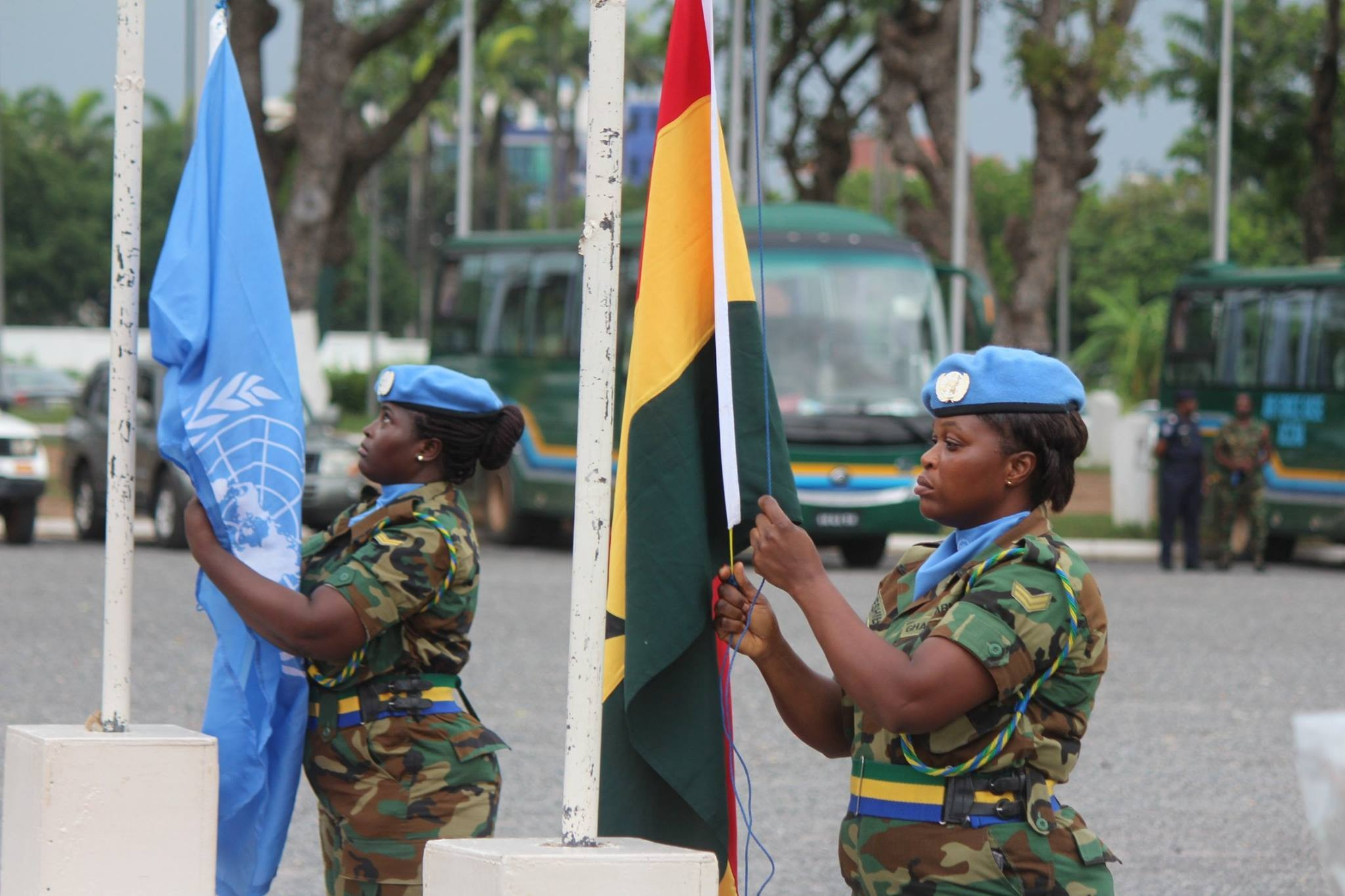
Two female soldiers of the UN peacekeeper contingent of the Ghana Army at the flag hoisting ceremony before the US Embassy in Accra

== Background ==
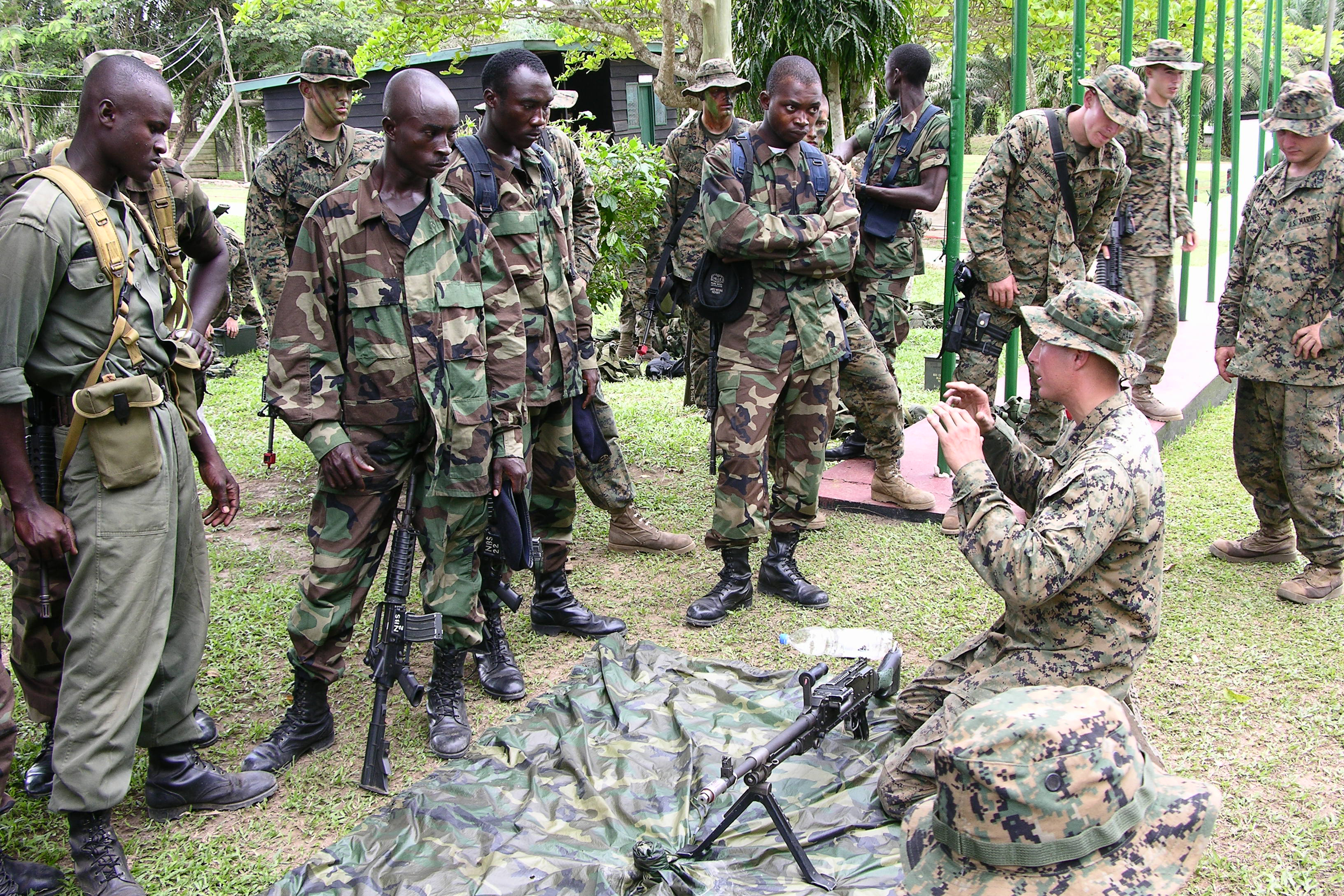
US military and Ghana Army in a Jungle warfare training in Achiase, Ghana

Ghana and the United States of America have had a cordial bilateral relationship since Ghana's independence on 6 March 1957. Ghana has cooperated with the U.S. in a wide variety of fields, including education, aviation, agricultural commodities, telecommunications, defence, economic support, and technical support. It has an extradition treaty with Ghana.

=== Military cooperation ===
In 1961, Ghana was the first country in which the United States deployed Peace Corps personnel, after President John F. Kennedy issued an executive order to establish an agency within the Department of State. Since then, the two countries have engaged in joint military cooperation and exchange programs. A recent example of this occurred when Ghanaian military forces, which had trained in jungle warfare for the past four decades, aided the regionally aligned forces of United States Army Africa in a jungle warfare training exercise in the Achiase Military Base in Ghana.

== Controversy ==
The main opposition party in Ghana, the National Democratic Congress, raised concerns that the deal provided one-sided benefits to the United States. It emerged in March 2018 that the government of Ghana had agreed to a similar Military Agreement in 1998 and again in 2015 under the leadership of the National Democratic Congress (NDC). The NDC denied these claims, and stated that should they be reelected in 2020, they would withdraw from the SOFA agreement.

=== Details of the 2018 agreement ===
The opposition party, the National Democratic Congress, registered their displeasure at some of the terms of the Agreement which give their US counterparts unfettered access to Ghana's resources. Among some of the US Department of Defense requests from the Nana Akuffo-Addo -led New Patriotic Party government, which the opposition party deems contentious and insists be renegotiated are:

1. "Ghana hereby provides unimpeded access to and use of agreed facilities and areas to United States forces, United States contractors, and others as mutually agreed. Such agreed facilities and area: or portions thereof, provided by Ghana shall be designated as either for exclusive use by United States forces or to be jointly used by United States forces and Ghana. Ghana shall also provide access to and use of a runway that meets the requirements of United States forces"
2. "Ghana recognizes that it may be necessary for United States forces to use the radio spectrum. United States forces shall be allowed to operate its own telecommunication systems (as telecommunication is defined in the 1992 Constitution and Convention of the International Telecommunication Union). This shall include the right to utilize such means and services as required to ensure full ability to operate telecommunication systems, and the right to use all necessary radio spectrum for this purpose. Use of the radio spectrum shall be free of cost to United States forces."
3. "Ghana shall accord to military personnel and civilian personnel the privileges, exemptions, and immunities equivalent to those accorded to the administrative and technical staff of a diplomatic mission under the Vienna Convention on Diplomatic Relations of 18 April 1961."
4. "United States forces and United States contractors may undertake construction activities on, and make alterations and improvements to, agreed facilities and areas. United States forces may carry out construction works and other services with military personnel and civilian personnel."
5. "United States forces are hereby authorized to control entry to agreed facilities and areas that having been provided for exclusive use by United States forces, and to coordinate entry with the authorities of Ghana at agreed facilities and areas provided for joint use by United States force and Ghana, for purposes of safety and security."

The most contentious clause is the one that states that "[t]he United States Forces may undertake construction activities, and make alterations and improvements to, agreed facilities and areas." This was largely interpreted by the opposition party and security experts as a request for setting up a military base in the country, which the Government vehemently denied.

=== Parliamentary walkout ===
After easily getting cabinet approval, the agreement was sent to the Parliament of Ghana for ratification. It was brought before the House for consideration and ratification after the joint-committee on Defense and Interior Constitutional, Legal and Parliamentary Affairs of Parliament gave it a green light. The minority leader Haruna Iddrisu expressed his reservations on the floor of Parliament House in an attempt to convince the speaker, Aaron Mike Oquaye, to rescind his decision on laying the document before the House. His request was denied and he and his colleagues walked out to express their disapproval of the Agreement.

=== Popular protest ===
A section of the population and civil societies also registered their displeasure with the Military Agreement. Notable among them is the Ghana First Patriotic Front (GFPF). They organized a peaceful protest in the national capital to declare their dissatisfaction with the Agreement. The Ghana Federation of Labour also appealed to the President to expunge some of the clauses enshrined in the document, which they said are not in the best interests of the country.

== President's response ==
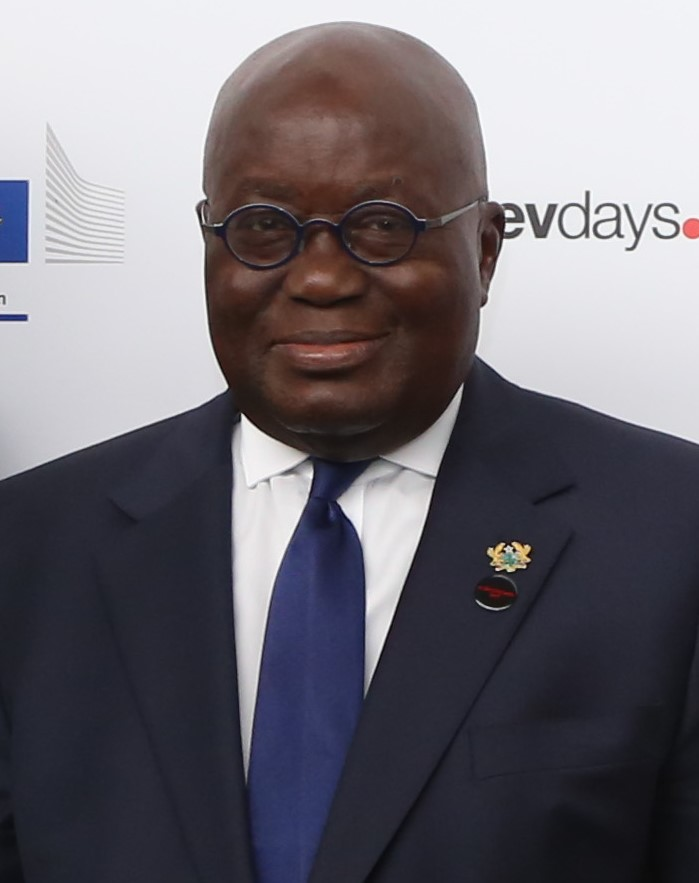
President of Ghana, Nana Akuffo-Addo

In response, President Nana Akufo-Addo stated on national television that the military agreement did not include approval for the construction of a future military base, and further added that his government will not consider any such request.

== Criticism ==
Various Ghanaian intellectuals and politicians have voiced concerns and opposition to the military agreement, including former president Jerry Rawlings, MP Samuel Okudzeto Ablakwa, and Bright Simons. Chief among their concerns is that the agreement will impede Ghanaian self-sovereignty. Some commentators specifically voiced concerns that the United States was seeking to use the agreement to "take control of Ghana's and Africa's natural resources, particularly its oil reserves."

== See also ==
- Ghana Army
- United States Army
- Military
