= Ghana Federation of Labour =

National trade union centre in Ghana

GFL
- Ghana Federation of Labour
- Headquarters: Accra
- Members: 48,300 (2016)
- Key people: Abraham Koomson, secretary general
- Affiliations: ITUC

The Ghana Federation of Labour (GFL) is a national trade union centre in Ghana. The origins of the GFL can be traced to the departure of a group of workers from the TUC-affiliated Industrial and Commercial Workers' Union who then founded the Textile, Garment and Leather Employees Union (TGLEU) in 1993. The TGLEU subsequently attempted to affiliate to the TUC, but was refused. In 1996, changes in labour law in Ghana allowed trade union pluralism and in 1998 the GFL was founded.

== Affiliates ==
The GFL has nine affiliated unions:

- Textile, Garment and Leather Employees’ Union. (TEGLEU)
- Food And Allied Workers’ Union (FAWU)
- General Manufacturing And Metal Workers’ Union (GEMM)
- Union Of Private Security Personnel (UPSP)
- National Union of Teamster And General Workers (NUTEG)
- Finance And Business Services Union (FBSEU)
- Private School Teachers and Educational Workers’ Union of Ghana (PRISTEG)
- Media Of Printing Industry Workers’ Union (MEDIANET)
- ICT and General Services Employees Union
