= National Union of Seamen, Ports and Allied Workers =

Ghanaian trade union

The National Union of Seamen, Ports and Allied Workers (NUSPAW) is a trade union representing seafarers in Ghana.

The union was founded in 1940 as the National Union of Seamen, and affiliated to the Ghana Trades Union Congress. By 1974, it had 7,000 members. In 1980, it absorbed the seafarers' section of the Maritime and Dockworkers' Union (MDU), but failed to grow, having 5,011 members in 1984. The privatisation of most state-owned maritime companies led to a steady decline in membership, and by 2018 it had only 1,500 members. At that time, it was discussing a possible merger with the MDU.
