= Anthony Yaw Baah =

Anthony Yaw Baah (born 27 December 1966) is a Ghanaian trade unionist. Since 2016, he has been the president of the Ghana Trades Union Congress. He is also a board member of the National Development Planning Commission, which is a Ghanaian state agency committed to eradicating poverty and reducing inequalities in deprived areas and rural communities.

He holds a BA Economics with French from the University of Ghana, an MSc. Financial Economics from the BI Norwegian Business School, and a PhD. in economics from the University of Sussex.

Yaw Baah was hired as a researcher for the Ghana TUC in 1993. He was elected without opposition in 2016 after securing the support of 16 of the 17 federated unions.
