= General Agricultural Workers' Union =

Ghanaian trade union

The General Agricultural Workers' Union (GAWU) is a trade union representing workers in the agriculture sector in Ghana.

The union was founded on 5 February 1959, with the merger of the Agricultural Division Workers' Union, the Animal Health Workers’ Union, the Forestry Division Employees' Union and the Produce Inspection Employees' Union. It affiliated to the Ghana Trades Union Congress. Almost all of its early members worked for state-owned businesses, but it gradually evolved to have strong representation in both the public and private sectors. Since 1979, it has also represented smallholders and unwaged rural workers.

In 1986, the union was the first in Ghana to appoint a National Women's Co-ordinator, and it has since appointed women's committees in each region. By 1985, the union had 100,000 members, but this had fallen to 50,000 by 2018.
