= Union of Industry, Commerce and Finance =

Trade union in Ghana

The Union of Industry, Commerce and Finance (UNICOF) is a trade union representing workers in various sectors, in Ghana.

The union was founded in August 2003, as a split from the Industrial and Commercial Workers' Union (ICU). The Ghana Trades Union Congress (TUC) accepted the new union as an affiliate, which led UNICOF to resign from the TUC. On formation, the union had 4,000 members, and by 2011 this had grown to 12,000.

The union was initially led by General Secretary John Esiape, but he was suspended from office in 2016. Since then, it has been led by Chief Executive Officer John Senanu Amegashie.
