= Local Government Workers' Union =

Ghanaian trade union

The Local Government Workers' Union (LGWU) is a trade union representing municipal workers in Ghana.

The union was founded in 1956, and affiliated to the Ghana Trade Union Congress. It absorbed the General Municipal Workers' Union in 1960. By 1977, its membership had grown to 36,000, but it fell due to structural adjustment policies, and by 1985 was down to 13,000. By 2018, its membership was about 10,000, and it was competing for members with the rival Civil and Local Government Staff Association of Ghana.
