= Union of Informal Workers Associations =

Ghanaian trade union

Union of Informal Workers Associations (UNIWA) is Ghana's first national trade union for workers in the informal economy. It was established in 2013 under the name CIWA (Council of Informal Workers Associations) which was later changed to UNIWA in recognition of its status as a trade union. It is affiliated with the Trade Union Congress of Ghana.
The informal sector is a large part of the Ghanaian economy. It contributes around 40.6% to the GDP of Ghana and around 90% of the workforce is employed in the informal sector. The nature of the informal economy entails that workers in the sector are often vulnerable to exploitation. UNIWA was therefore set up as a way of organizing informal workers to protect their rights.

== Aims ==
The aim of UNIWA is to organise informal workers into trade unions in order to promote their common interest and strengthen their bargaining power vis-à-vis the government and employers.
More specifically, the aims of UNIWA include:

- To organize workers in the informal economy into association with the purpose of protecting, sustaining and promoting their common interest
- To organize seminars, workshops and other programs for the education of members of member association
- To assist member associations in negotiating appropriate remuneration, hours of work and other terms of employment of its members
- To assist the Trade Union Congress of Ghana (TUC) and other national Unions to achieve their aims and objectives of protecting workers rights
- To provide legal assistance to members as and when necessary

== Members ==
The organisation consists of a number of affiliated organisations which are as follows:

Founding members:

- Musicians Union of Ghana (MUSIGA)
- Ghana Actors Guild (GAG)
- Ghana Union of physically disabled workers (GUPDW)
- New Makola Market Traders Union
- Greater Accra Tomato Traders Association (GATTA)
- Agbobloshie Chop Bar Keepers Association
- Wacam
- Ghana Youth Porters Association
- Ga East Traders Association

New Associations yet to be admitted into UNIWA:

- Indigenous Caterers Association
- Informal Hawkers and Venders Association, Ghana (IHVAG) Streetnet
- Novotel Market N0.2 Odorna
- Tema Station Market Association
- Greater Accra Market Association
