= Public Services Workers' Union =

Ghanaian trade union

- Abbreviation: PSWU
- Predecessor: Ghana Broadcasting Corporation Union; Customs, Excise and Preventive Service Union; Meteorological Department Union; Produce Inspection Workers' Union
- Founded: June 22, 1959; 66 years ago

The Public Services Workers' Union (PSWU) is a trade union representing public sector workers in Ghana.

The union was founded on 22 June 1959, as the Government Clerical and Technical Employees' Union, with the merger of the Ghana Broadcasting Corporation Union, the Customs, Excise and Preventive Service Union, the Meteorological Department Union and the Produce Inspection Workers' Union. It affiliated to the Ghana Trades Union Congress. It initially had 2,000 members, but grew steadily. It became the PSWU in the early 1960s, when it merged with the Public Utility Workers' Union, and although that union split away again in 1967, the PSWU retained its name.

By 2001, it had 27,084 members, and in 2019 its membership was about 24,000. It also has about 80,000 associate members through the Ghana Government Pensioners' Association.
