= Construction and Building Materials Workers' Union =

Ghanaian trade union

The Construction and Building Materials Workers' Union (CBMWU) is a trade union representing workers in the building and road construction industries in Ghana.

The union was founded in 1954 (71 years ago), and became the National Union of Building Trades Operatives and General Workers in 1956, when its absorbed the Ghana Housing Employees' Union and the Ghana Masons' Union. Its membership initially focused on workers at state-owned companies, such as the State Construction Company, Public Works Department and Ghana Highways Authority. It was later renamed the Construction and Building Workers' Union, and by 1977 was the third-largest affiliate of the Ghana Trades Union Congress, with 68,820 members.

From the late 1970s, government construction jobs were gradually outsourced, and membership has fallen accordingly, standing at 10,000 in 2018. By that time the construction industry in Ghana was dominated by Chinese-owned companies with workers on insecure contracts. These provide the bulk of the union's small membership, for which it competes with the Construction and Allied Workers' Union.
