= Ghana Union of Teachers =

Ghanaian trade union

The Ghana Union of Teachers (GUT) was a trade union representing lower-paid schoolteachers in Ghana.

The union was established in 1956, with the merger of the Gold Coast Teachers' Union and the National Union of Teachers (NUT), under the presidency of Albert Hammond. Originally named the Gold Coast Union of Teachers, it became the "Ghana Union of Teachers" (GUT) in 1957, when Ghana gained independence. It affiliated to the Ghana Trade Union Congress (TUC).

In 1957, some teachers resigned from the GUT, upset by its secular approach, to form the Federation of Gold Coast Union of Teachers (FGCUT). This was encouraged by some members of the Government of Ghana, who disliked general secretary Victor Christian Aggrey Fynn, as he had recently led a successful strike. A new conference was held in 1958, bringing together FGCUT with the former NUT members, and a newly founded association of university and college workers. This formed the Union of Teachers and Educational Institution Workers, a new TUC affiliate, which operated alongside the GUT and largely supplanted it. On formation, it had 18,733 members. The union soon became the Union of Teachers and Cultural Services (UTCS).

Workers who earned more than £680 per year were not eligible for TUC membership, and this substantial minority of teachers received fewer benefits from the unions, many avoiding joining. Other teachers felt that the unions were too closely linked with the Convention People's Party. In 1962, a referendum among teachers indicated that the majority would prefer not to be part of the TUC, and the government permitted them to form the Ghana National Association of Teachers. The GUT and UTCS were dissolved, and replaced by the Teachers' and Educational Workers' Union.
