= William Emmanuel Abraham =

Ghanaian philosopher (born 1934)

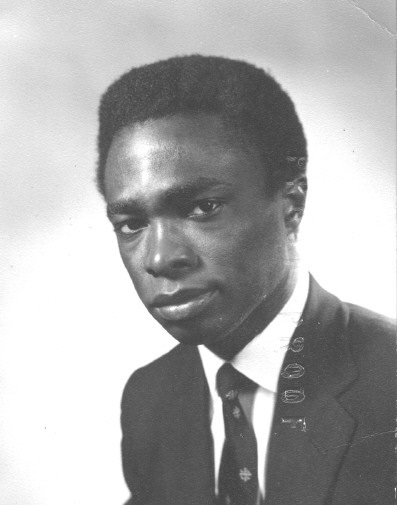
- Born: Kojo Abraham; 28 May 1934 (age 92)
- Education: Adisadel Secondary School; University of Ghana; All Souls College, Oxford
- Occupation: Philosopher

William Emmanuel Abraham, also known as Willie E. Abraham, or his day name, Kojo Abraham (born on Monday, 28 May 1934), is a Nigerian-born Ghanaian retired philosopher.

== Biography ==
Abraham was born in Lagos, Nigeria, to Ghanaian parents, and was raised within the Akan (Fante) cultural milieu before receiving his schooling in Ghana and Great Britain.

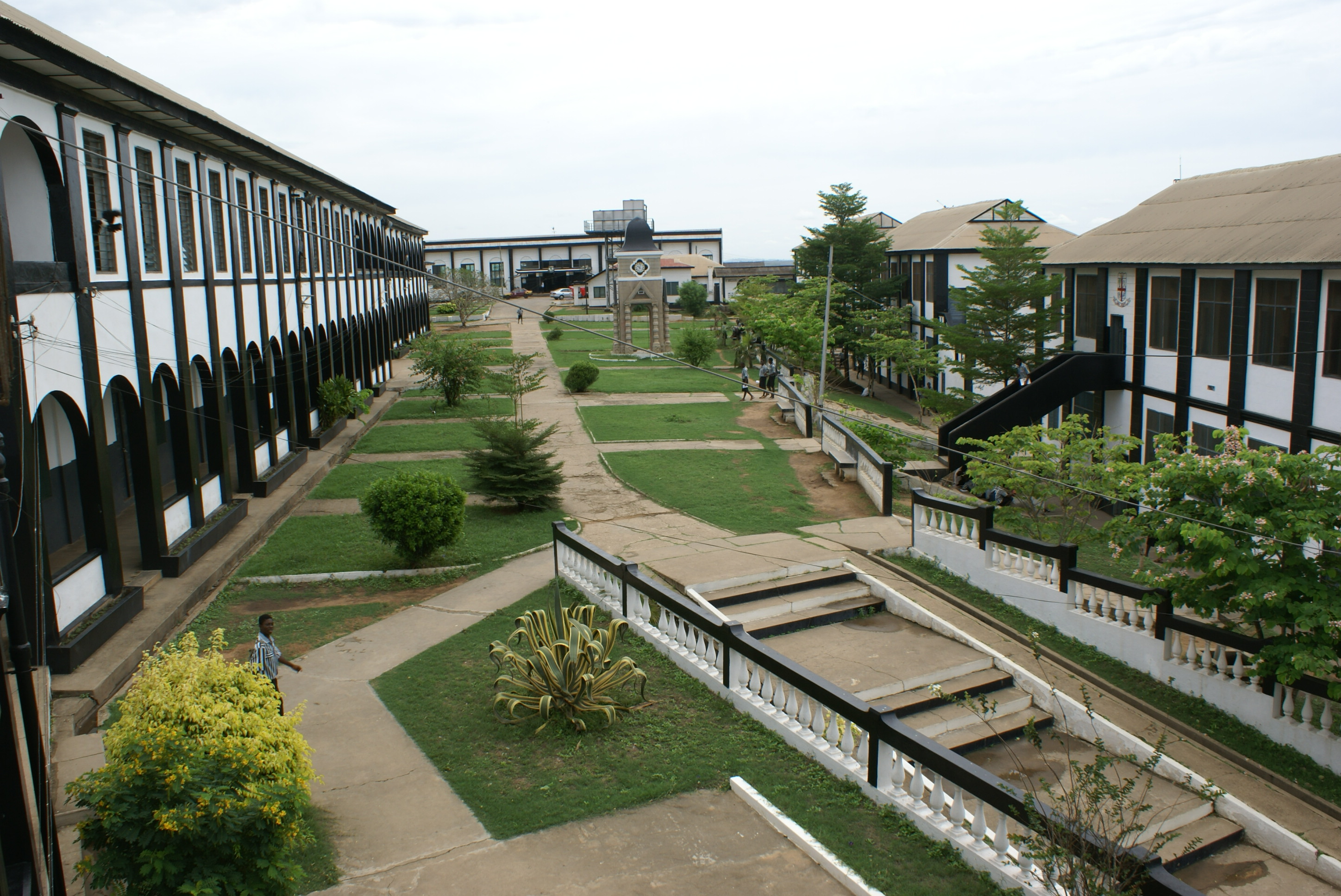
Secondary School Attended by Abraham

Abraham was educated at the Government Boys' School and Adisadel Secondary School in Cape Coast, Ghana. He obtained a BA from the University of Ghana, graduating with first-class honours in philosophy in 1957. Travelling to England to study at Oxford University, he received a B.Phil. and was the first African to be elected a Fellow of All Souls College. In 1960, he was nominated to be a Governor of the School of Oriental and African Studies, London University.

While at All Souls, Abraham recalled facing overt racism from some senior fellows, including one who told him at a formal dinner that he "did not like black people", and a warden who accepted his election only grudgingly. Abraham later reflected that strict rules and procedures within the college could sometimes protect students from the arbitrary effects of such prejudice.

In the early 1960s, at the invitation of President Kwame Nkrumah, Abraham left Oxford to return to Ghana and help build the new nation's universities; he joined the Department of Philosophy at the University of Ghana, became head of the department, and served in what later commentators have described as an informal role as Nkrumah's "court philosopher" in his Pan-Africanist inner circle. Abraham has likened this advisory role to that of Leibniz tutoring the House of Brunswick, noting that Nkrumah would sometimes call him in the middle of the night for advice and consult him "whenever he was in a corner", even though the two men were not personal friends. During this period he published his book The Mind of Africa, a philosophical work arguing for Pan-Africanism and articulating a defence of African unity, and became a prominent public intellectual in Nkrumah's Ghana through his writings and speeches on ideology, political education and the press.

He was elected vice-president of the Ghana Academy of Arts and Sciences in 1963, in that capacity visiting scientific facilities in the Soviet Union on a seven-week tour in the summer of 1963. He became a close associate of Nkrumah, collaborating on Nkrumah's work Consciencism: Philosophy and Ideology for Decolonisation, published in 1964, and replacing Conor Cruise O'Brien as Vice-Chancellor of the University of Ghana in September 1965. He also chaired a commission that reported in 1964 on "alleged irregularities and malpractices in connection with the issue of import licences", and was a non-resident lecturer in African Studies at the Kwame Nkrumah Ideological Institute from 1963 until its closure in 1966.

Some contemporaries and later scholars have questioned the authorship of Consciencism. As Ama Biney states in her doctoral thesis, Kwame Nkrumah: An Intellectual Biography: "There is considerable speculation that Nkrumah was not the writer of this book and rather Prof. William Abraham was instead the author.... The impenetrable style of writing is unlike that of Nkrumah's other more accessible works."' The view that Abraham may have been the book's principal author remains debated in the secondary literature.

Although Abraham remained a committed Nkrumaist and Pan-Africanist, he did not always agree with Nkrumah's political decisions. He has recalled publicly that he and others remonstrated with Nkrumah over his intervention in a trial of political opponents and that he wrote an article arguing that Nkrumah was "not a god", after which, according to Abraham, the party press "didn't know what to do"; the death sentences in that case were ultimately commuted.

Abraham's proximity to Nkrumah also meant that he was directly caught up in the regime's downfall. He was one of the senior figures left in charge in February 1966 when the army and police launched the 1966 coup while Nkrumah was abroad, and he was subsequently arrested and held in "protective custody" by the new military rulers before leaving Ghana for the United States in 1968.

After the February 1966 coup, Abraham left Ghana; he came to the United States in 1968 and eventually settled in California, joining the philosophy faculty at the University of California, Santa Cruz as a full professor in 1973 and later retiring as professor emeritus in 1994. He also held an academic position as Professor of Philosophy at Macalester College in Saint Paul, Minnesota. He has had a life-long scholarly interest in the life and work of the eighteenth-century Ghanaian philosopher Anton Wilhelm Amo and in the metaphysics and logic of the seventeenth- and early eighteenth-century German philosopher Gottfried Wilhelm Leibniz. After living in the United States for more than four decades, he returned to Ghana and appeared in a televised interview on 3News Ghana in December 2019.

== Works ==
=== Books and monographs ===
- He Dwells Among Us: Son of God and Son of Man. Bloomington, IN: WestBow Press, 2021.
- What Did Jesus Do? Some Theological Reflections. Bloomington, IN: WestBow Press, 2017.
- The Mind of Africa. Accra: Sub-Saharan Publishers, 2015.
- The Mind of Africa. Chicago: University of Chicago Press, 1962.

=== Book chapters ===
- "African Philosophers" (with Olúfémi Táíwò, D. A. Masolo, F. Abiola Irele and Claude Sumner). In Robert L. Arrington (ed.), A Companion to the Philosophers. Malden, MA: Blackwell, 2008, pp. 1–38.
- "Anton Wilhelm Amo". In Kwasi Wiredu (ed.), A Companion to African Philosophy. Malden, MA: Blackwell, 2004, pp. 191–199.
- "The Life and Times of Anton Wilhelm Amo, the First African (Black) Philosopher in Europe". In Molefi Kete Asante and Abu Shardow Abarry (eds.), African Intellectual Heritage: A Book of Sources. Philadelphia: Temple University Press, 1996, pp. 424–440.
- "Theory of Human Society". In Molefi Kete Asante and Abu Shardow Abarry (eds.), African Intellectual Heritage: A Book of Sources. Philadelphia: Temple University Press, 1996, pp. 452–461.
- "A Paradigm of African Society". In Safro Kwame (ed.), Readings in African Philosophy: An Akan Collection. Lanham, MD: University Press of America, 1995, pp. 39–65.
- "Crisis in African Cultures". In Kwame Gyekye and Kwasi Wiredu (eds.), Person and Community: Ghanaian Philosophical Studies, I. Cultural Heritage and Contemporary Change, Series II: Africa, vol. 1. Washington, D.C.: The Council for Research in Values and Philosophy, 1992, pp. 13–38. ISBN 1-56518-004-6
- "Sources of African Identity". In Kwame Gyekye and Kwasi Wiredu (eds.), Person and Community: Ghanaian Philosophical Studies, I. Cultural Heritage and Contemporary Change, Series II: Africa, vol. 1. Washington, D.C.: The Council for Research in Values and Philosophy, 1992.
- "Problems in Africa's Self-Definition in the Contemporary World". In Kwame Gyekye and Kwasi Wiredu (eds.), Person and Community: Ghanaian Philosophical Studies, I. Cultural Heritage and Contemporary Change, Series II: Africa, vol. 1. Washington, D.C.: The Council for Research in Values and Philosophy, 1992.

=== Journal articles ===
- "The Origins of Myth and Philosophy". Man and World, vol. 11, nos. 1–2 (1978), pp. 165–185. doi:10.1007/BF01248171.
- "Predication". Studia Leibnitiana, vol. 7, no. 1 (1975), pp. 1–20.
- "Complete Concepts and Leibniz's Distinction between Necessary and Contingent Propositions". Studia Leibnitiana, vol. 1, no. 4 (1969), pp. 263–279.
- "The Life and Times of Anton Wilhelm Amo, the First African (Black) Philosopher in Europe". Transactions of the Historical Society of Ghana, vol. 7 (1964), pp. 60–81.

=== Other academic writings ===
- Review of Hide Ishiguro, Leibniz' Philosophy of Logic and Language. Man and World, vol. 8, no. 3 (1975), p. 347.

=== Public and civic writings ===
- "Kwame Relies on the Masses". The Nkrumaist, vol. 4, no. 1 (January 1966), pp. 11–14.
- Speech at the launching of Kwame Nkrumah's Neo-Colonialism, the Last Stage of Imperialism. The Spark, no. 161 (19 November 1965).
- "The Role of the Press in the Transition to Socialism". In W. M. Sulemann-Sibidow, The African Journalist. Winneba: Kwame Nkrumah Ideological Institute, 1965, pp. 43–51.
- "Political Education is Essential". The Ghanaian Times, 24 October 1964.
- "Ideologies in Contemporary Africa". The Ghanaian Times, 7, 11, 21, 24 December 1963.
