= Timber and Woodworkers' Union =

Ghanaian trade union

The Timber and Woodworkers' Union (TWU) is a trade union representing carpenters, sawmill workers, and cane weavers in Ghana.

The union was established in 1952, and affiliated to the Ghana Trade Union Congress. By 1970, it had 20,850 members, and by 2012 this had grown to 25,000. However, by 2018, its membership was only 8,400 in both the formal and informal sectors.
