= Health Services Workers' Union =

Ghanaian trade union

- Founded: 1965
- Location: Ghana
- Members: 28,000
- Key people: Reynolds Tenkorang, General Secretary; Zakaria Mohammed, National Chair
- Affiliations: GTUC, PSI
- Website: hwww.hswutucghana.org

The Health Services Workers' Union (HSWU) is a trade union representing skilled workers in the health sector in Ghana.

The HSWU is affiliated to the Ghana Trades Union Congress. In addition to workers in the formal heath sector, it also represents traditional birth attendants, and practitioners and retailers of traditional medicine. As of 2018, it had 28,811 members.
