= Ghana National Association of Teachers =

Ghanaian trade union

The Ghana National Association of Teachers (GNAT) is a trade union representing school and college teachers in Ghana. They promote and protect the rights and interests of the child, as well as place the services of the Association at the disposal of individuals, public bodies and other organizations in pursuit of education. The union was founded on 14 July 1962, on the initiative of teachers, many former members of the Ghana Union of Teachers, who did not want to be linked with the Ghana Trade Union Congress (TUC). The Government of Ghana permitted the formation on the condition that it was registered as a voluntary association, not a trade union. On formation, the union had 24,384 members.

The union grew steadily, and by 2012 it had 194,000 members, falling slightly to 178,000 in 2018.

== Function ==
The functions of the Executive include exercising general control over the management and administration of the Association, ensuring implementation of approved policies, programmes and projects, approving recommendations and reports of the National Officers, taking affirmative action to ensure effective participation.
