= Kwame Nkrumah Ideological Institute =

Educational institution in Ghana

- Winneba; Ghana

Information
- Other name: Winneba ideological Institute
- Type: Technical school
- Established: 1961
- Founder: Kwame Nkrumah
- Closed: 1966
- Authority: Ministry of Education (Ghana); Convention People's Party; Bureau of African Affairs
- Principal: Kodwo Addison
- Affiliation: Convention People's Party; Bureau of African Affairs

The Kwame Nkrumah Ideological Institute of Economics and Political Science, also known as the Winneba Ideological Institute, was an educational body in Winneba, 40 miles from Accra, Ghana. It was founded by Kwame Nkrumah, then Ghana's president, to promote socialism and the decolonization of Africa and, as Nkrumah told a meeting of his Bureau of African Affairs in 1960, to be "an institute where selected dedicated members of all nationalist movements of Africa could be rigidly indoctrinated in the realism of African unity". He went on to say that "trainees should be made to realize the Party's ideology is a religion and should be carried out faithfully and fervently." Nkrumah was influenced by his Russian security advisers to use the institute as his selecting ground for future members of the Security Service; at the time, there were approximately 600 Ghanaian students studying in the Soviet Union.

The stated purpose of the institute was: 1) To train Socialist Ghanaians capable of taking into their hands the key posts in all sectors of the apparatus of the state and the economy, and to take an active part in the Socialist People’s Party; (2) To train African freedom fighters in the spirit of the African revolution, Pan-Africanism and Socialism in such a way that when they return to their homelands they will be better armed to take an active part in liberating their countries from imperialism, colonialism and neo-colonialism; (3) To train Africans in the spirit of Pan-Africanism as a method of making progress toward an African union; (4) To train Africans in the spirit of Nkrumahism which is considered the development of Marxism in conditions and circumstances peculiar to Africa; and (5) To train Africans in the spirit of proletarian internationalism.

The institute consisted of the Ideological Education Training Centre and the Positive Action Training Centre. Its courses were designed to equip students with the ability to be active partners in the development of their communities, nation and continent. Workers could attend the institute for a short time to improve their skills, or take one of the two-year courses offered in such things as political science, economics, political institutions, African Studies and leadership.

In 1963, the institute had 210 students, with 77 enrolled in the two-year diploma course taught by eight staff members. By 1965, it had 550 students, including 250 full-time students, and 546 employees, including nine Ghanaian lecturers and 12 Eastern European lecturers who were appointed by the institute or Nkrumah's Convention People's Party (CPP). One former student was Zimbabwean dictator Robert Mugabe

As the only ideological institute on the African continent, the school accepted "freedom fighters" from any liberation movement, although non-Ghanaian students were required to be members of an organization fighting for independence. Most students were from Ghana, with the rest mainly coming from Nigeria, Senegal, and Somalia. In 1962, the institute housed 46 graduates of the Mankrong Camp–one of Nkrumah's secret guerrilla training camps, and taught students how to handle weapons and explosives. Public officers were given the option of attending while receiving full salary. As most of the population of Ghana still had no access to ideological education, 'study groups' were organized throughout the country and, in 1963, the Ministry of Education requested that all secondary schools and higher institutions begin incorporating ideological education into the curriculum.

== Physical plant ==
Nkrumah laid the institute's foundation stone on 18 February 1961. The physical plant initially consisted of six cottages for teachers and a three-story building with classrooms on the first floor and student bedrooms above. A second building was constructed, with offices, cooking and laundry facilities and a large dining hall, plus more bedrooms. In 1963, Nkrumah provided £1,100,000 for an elaborate expansion program which included the construction of a main hall, 30 staff houses, a library, a 40-bed hospital, a swimming pool, a debaters' pit, an £18,000 bell tower to play party solidarity songs on the hour, and a 20-foot granite statue of Nkrumah. By November 1964, a large residence hall had been completed; a second was under construction and a third projected.

== Management and staff ==
The institute's Director was Kodwo Addison, widely known in Ghana as a Communist activist; he was a trade unionist, a member of the CPP Marxist wing and Honorary President of the Ghana-USSR Friendship Society. A. K. Barden, Director of the Bureau of African Affairs, was Deputy Rector and both he and Addison reported to H. H. Cofie-Crabbe, Executive Secretary of the CPP.

Addison said that the institute would "aim at becoming the conscience of Africa. Africans of all regions will be trained at the Institute, including freedom fighters and terrorists; foreign students will get mostly Marxist and African nationalistic training. They also will be taught how to fight their governments from two points of views: constitutionally and revolutionarily". Addison's goal was to have 1,000 students by 1965; he also planned for there to be guerilla warfare training at the school and referred to students as "activists". Addison also worked to obtain university status for the institute, but the Ghana's National Council for Higher Education found that it did not meet the UNESCO definition of a university, or the requirements of the Ghana Education Act, and classified it as a "technical school".

During his tenure as Director, Addison was named a member of the three-man Presidential Commission, which would act for Nkrumah should he be incapacitated (Addison was expelled from the commission in 1965). He became a member of the Central Committee of the CPP concerned with organizational and ideological work, chairman of the CPP Education Committee, member of the Board of Directors of the Ghana Broadcasting Corporation, member of the Board of Directors of Ghana's most widely-read daily newspaper, the Daily Graphic, member of a Committee to Review Pre-University Education, and assistant to the Director of Press and Radio. With each of these positions, Addison consolidated his control over Ghana's information and education systems. In the 1965 Ghanaian parliamentary election, in which only CPP members were allowed to run, Addison was elected as Member of Parliament for the Ateiku region.

Addison also employed, as lecturer, Professor William Emmanuel Abraham, and named him chairman of a committee "to inspect publications in bookshops and libraries of schools, colleges and universities in the country". The Hungarian journalist Tibor Szamuely taught history at the institute. Communist Party of Great Britain member Pat Sloan, who espoused Soviet Democracy, was appointed Lecturer in Socialism. Other lecturers included the American Communist Grace Arnold, who had taught at the Parteihochschule Karl Marx in East Berlin, the Polish statistician J. M. Perczynski, the Russian 'consultant' Boris Petruk, and the Czech translator Pavel Kovaly, who taught Philosophy. The physical education teacher was A.K. Tehoda, who had fled to Ghana after being imprisoned in his native Togo in connection with the assassination of President Sylvanus Olympio. The Guadelopian writer Maryse Condé, who was a lecturer in French, would write in her memoir that the institute was "marred by architectural ugliness, intellectual mediocrity and excessive drinking". Sexual harassment was also a problem; Condé wrote that she had sex with Addison to keep her job and, when she finally refused, was forced to resign. Shortly before the school's closure, Addison remarked that he wanted to relax the admission criteria for women so they could "share fully in the national reconstruction".

== Closure ==
Nkrumah's regime was toppled by military coup on February 24, 1966. The institute immediately collapsed. Addison was arrested and the foreign teachers were sent home within 48 hours. Students packed their bags and left, without protest or resistance. The institute's bank accounts were frozen and the new government, the National Liberation Council paid the school's debts. Most of the staff were relieved, with one stating that "it was constantly humiliating to have to listen to men of little education and less background laying down the law about economics and philosophy."
