= Railway Workers Union (Iraq) =

The Railway Workers Union (Arabic: نقابة السكك الحديدية) was a trade union of railway employees in Iraq. The union was dominated by communists, and was suppressed by the government in 1945.

== Foundation ==
In August 1944, diplomatic relations were established between Iraq and the Soviet Union. The government issued a permit for the railway workers to form a union of their own on September 7, 1944. The founding conference of the union was held in November 1944. Some 10,000 workers took part in the event. Ali Shukr, a Central Committee member of the Iraqi Communist Party, was elected chairman of the Railway Workers Union.

== April 1945 strike ==
Between April 15 and 30, 1945 the railway workers organized a major strike. The strike erupted in Baghdad, but spread to other cities. The Railway Workers Union had demanded a 30 to 40% salary increase, a demand that was rejected by the British-managed Railways Directorate.

The strike was met with heavy-handed repression from the authorities. Seeking to quash the strike, the Interior Ministry and the Railways Directorate threatened to replace Iraqi workers with Indian labourers and cut the water supply to the workers' living quarters in Baghdad. These moves prompted solidarity actions and the spread to the strike to Samawah on April 16, Basra on April 18 and Mosul on April 19. The members of the strike committee were arrested. The Railway Workers Union was banned. However, the strike continued. In the end the Railway Directorate agreed to a 20-30% salary hike.

== Aftermath of the 1945 strike ==
Unrest amongst the railway workers would continue for another 3 years, with more strikes. The 1945 railway workers strike also inspired other groups, such as port and oil workers, to launch strike actions.
