= General Transport, Petroleum and Chemical Workers' Union =

Ghanaian trade union

The General Transport, Petroleum and Chemical Workers' Union (GTPCWU) is a trade union representing workers across various industries in Ghana.

The union was established in 1967 in Accra to represent workers in the formal road transport sector, air transport, and the chemical and petroleum industries. By 1985, membership had grown to 29,185; however, by 2018, this number had decreased to 7,500.
