= Maritime and Dockworkers' Union =

Ghanaian trade union

The Maritime and Dockworkers' Union (MDU) is a trade union representing workers in seaports in Ghana.

The union was founded in 1956, with the merger of six unions:

- Cooks' and Stewards' Union of Western Province
- Eastern Province Cooks' and Stewards' Union
- Elder Dempster Lines Dockworkers' Union
- Elder Dempster Lines Workers' Union
- Ghana Maritime Workers' Union
- National Seamen and Dock Workers' Union

The union affiliated to the Ghana Trades Union Congress, and by 1977, it had 22,250 members. In 1979/80, its section representing sailors split away, joining the National Union of Seamen. In 1988, its leadership was removed from office, arrested, and held in custody for 24 hours.

The union's port workers were originally employed by the Ghana Ports and Harbours Authority. After the privatisation of most of their work, their roles became casualised. The MDU worked with some private companies to form the Ghana Dock Labour Company, to provide its members with regular work. This employed around 4,800 workers in the early 2000s, but increased mechanisation reduced this figure. By 2018, the union's membership stood at 10,000.
