= Industrial and Commercial Workers' Union (Ghana) =

The Industrial and Commercial Workers' Union (ICU) is a general union, the largest union in Ghana.

== History ==
The union was founded on 25 May 1960, with the merger of five unions:

- Catering and Meat Cutters Union
- Commercial and Allied Workers' Union
- General Clerical and Public Boards Employees' Union
- Manufacturing and Industrial Workers' Union
- Printers and Newspapers Workers' Union

It was initially named the Industrial, Commercial, and General National Workers' Union. It affiliated to the Ghana Trades Union Congress (TUC). The largest union in the country, in the 1980s under L. G. K. Ocloo it became known for its opposition to the Provisional National Defence Council, and Ocloo was ultimately forced into exile.

In 1983, some union members split away, to form the Textile, Garment and Leather Employees' Union. A further group left in 2003, founding the Union of Industry, Commerce and Finance (UNICOF). The TUC accepted UNICOF as a new member, leading the ICU to resign from the TUC, in protest. This led to a long-running dispute over its offices in the Hall of Trade Unions in Accra. As of 2020, the union claims to have about 100,000 members.

== General Secretaries ==
1960: Benjamin T. Bartimeus
1964:
1972: Ben Edjah
1983: L. G. K. Ocloo
1991: Napoleon Kpoh
2010: Gilbert Awinongya
2013: Solomon Kotei
