= Railway Workers' Union (Ghana) =

Ghanaian trade union

The Railway Workers' Union (RWU) is a trade union representing workers, other than engine drivers, on the railways in Ghana.

The Railway Association was founded in 1926 in Sekondi, partly inspired by British railway trade unions, but specifically to protest against the refusal to employ technical staff on the same conditions as clerical staff. It launched major strikes in 1931 and 1939. In 1938, it was renamed as the Gold Coast Railway African Workers' Union. The Railway Enginemen's Union split away in 1939, and although it reunited in 1943, it again left in 1949, returning in 1962 but leaving again in 1966.

The union affiliated to the Ghana Trade Union Congress, and took part in strikes in 1950, 1961 and 1971. By 1977, it had 13,587 members. However, a reduction of routes by the Ghana Railway Corporation led to a steady decline in membership, to 4,580 in 2000, and just 1,342 by 2018.
