= John Kofi Barku Tettegah =

Ghanaian trade unionist, diplomat, and politician

John Kofi Barku Tettegah (1930–2009) was a Ghanaian trade unionist, diplomat, and politician. He held many influential positions in Ghana's government especially during the Nkrumah government, where he served as general-secretary of the Gold Coast Trades Union Congress (TUC), as a Convention People's Party (CPP) central committee member, and secretary-general of the All-African Trade Union Federation. He was influential to Kwame Nkrumah's domestic and foreign policy, and remains one of the most influential political organizers in Ghanaian labor history.

== Early life and education ==
John Tettegah was born on 12 September 1930 in Ada, Gold Coast (now in Ghana). Ada is a small town on the southeast coast of Ghana where the Volta river meets the Atlantic ocean. He attended Catholic schools as well as Secretarial College in Accra.

== Nkrumah administration ==
When the TUC reunited in 1953 following its dissolution after the January 1950 general strike, Tettegah was elected full time general-secretary of the TUC in September 1954. During his time as general-secretary of the TUC, Tettegah sought to strengthen the union's relationship to the CPP under Kwame Nkrumah while also ensuring the unions autonomy. Tettegah was a close associate of Tawia Adamafio and the more radical wing of the CPP, so shortly after he was elected general-secretary of the TUC he also became a member of the central committee of the CPP.

=== International engagements ===
During his tenure as general-secretary of the TUC, Tettegah also hoped to make connections with labor movements around the globe. When he was elected secretary-general of the TUC and appointed to the central committee of the CPP, the TUC created a task force to study Ghana's conditions as well as labor movements internationally, with the full backing of CPP influence and funding. Tettegah first traveled to Israel and West Germany in 1956 and was impressed with the highly centralized political framework of Israel's unions, reportedly saying "Israel has given me more in eight days than I could obtain from two years in a British University". Tettegah also chaired the International Confederation of Free Trade Union's (ICFTU) first African Regional Trade Union Conference in 1957, and led the conference to unanimously create a Pan-African worker's organization. By 1958, the All African People's Conference was hosted in Accra, the capital of Ghana, at which the All-African Trade Union Federation was formed. In August 1959 Tettegah delivered a speech at a joint conference of the Ghanaian and Nigerian TUC held in Lagos, Nigeria. His speech was titled Towards African Labour Unity. Tettegah was appointed to the position of roving ambassador of Ghana in July 1960, which signaled a change in Ghana's stance internationally. Tettegah's appointment was considered to be the final consolidation of power by the CPP's left-wing faction, as Ghana's foreign policy became more geared towards closer relations with the Soviet Union, China, and Eastern Europe. Nkrumah apparently relied on this faction of the CPP to mount a “full scale intellectual, educational and organisational attack on all aspects of colonialism, neo-colonialism and imperialism.” Tettegah also played a role in the souring of relations between Ghana and Israel, as left-wing associates of Tettegah like Tawia Adamafio replaced more moderate members of Nkruma's administration, and relations with the communist world became closer. Tettegah's left-wing influence continued to drive the direction of Ghanaian foreign policy until the fall of Kwame Nkrumah's government in 1966.

=== Domestic influence ===
Tettegah drew on his experiences with the labor movement abroad and applied them to the conditions in Ghana. At the TUC's fourteenth annual congress in 1957, Tettegah announced major changes in the structure of the TUC, including consolidating Ghana's sixty four labor unions into just 16, which was modeled after the structure of West Germany's 16 labor unions. Briefly in 1959 he also headed Kwame Nkrumah's Worker's Brigades, a program designed to help Ghana's unemployed youth. Since Tettegah had been active in the Ghanaian independence movement and supported the ruling Convention People's Party (CPP) from very early on, he used his influence to encourage the passage of the 1958 Industrial Relations Act, which made the TUC the sole representative of Ghana's labor movement. Tettegah used this opportunity to consolidate the leadership of the TUC into a centralized structure and curb dissent within the labor movement. Tettegah's work in the TUC was hugely influential in implementing Nkrumah's nationalist project of creating ideological cohesion in Ghana and transforming the Ghanaian mass into a disciplined, modern workforce.

== 1966 coup, exile, and arrest ==
When Kwame Nkrumah's government was overthrown in a violent coup d'état led by military and police forces who established the National Redemption Council in 1966, Tettegah went into voluntary exile, living in Tanzania, Egypt and Guinea. He returned to. Ghana in 1973. Shortly after his return to Ghana, Tettegah was arrested with his fellow diplomat Kojo Botsio, and both were charged with plotting to overthrow the government. While he was originally sentenced to death, his sentence was commuted to life in prison in April 1974. Tettegah was not released until November 1978, after Ghana's 1978 governmental referendum.

== Post-Nkrumah political activity ==
In 1980 Tettegah travelled to Nigeria to delivered the first in the series of Obafemi Awolowo Birthday Lectures. The first took place in Benin City, the second, Ibadan and the third, Lagos.

In 1983, the Provisional National Defense Council (PNDC) government appointed Tettegah ambassador to the Soviet Union and later represented Ghana in East Africa. He also supported Jerry Rawlings in the 1992 Ghanaian presidential election.
