= Public Utilities Workers' Union =

Ghanaian trade union

The Public Utilities Workers' Union (PUWU) is a trade union representing utility workers in Ghana.

The union's origins lie in the Gold Coast Public Utility and Allied Government Industrial Union, which represented junior staff in the Public Works Department, working in the water and electric sectors. In the early 1960s, it merged with the Government Clerical and Technical Employees Union, which renamed itself as the Public Services Workers' Union. However, in 1967, the public utility workers split away to form their own union, PUWU.

The new union affiliated to the Ghana Trades Union Congress, and by 1985, it had 20,000 members, falling to 10,288 in 2018. Most of its members work for the Ghana Water Company, the Electricity Company of Ghana, the State Housing Company, or the Community Water and Sanitation Agency.
