= Ghana Trades Union Congress =

Train union federation in Ghana

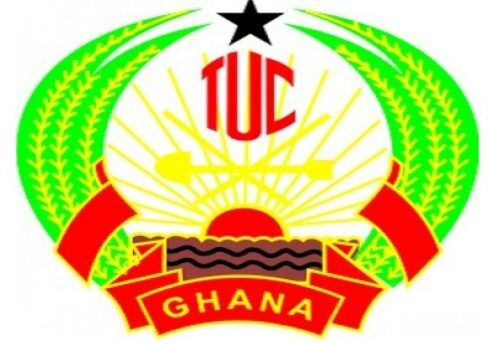
- Founded: 1945; 81 years ago
- Headquarters: Accra, Ghana
- Location: Ghana
- Members: 500,000
- Key people: Anthony Yaw Baah
- Affiliations: ITUC
- Website: ghanatuc.org

The Ghana Trades Union Congress is a national centre that unites various workers' organizations in Ghana. The organization was established in 1945.

== History ==
The GTUC as a central co-ordinating body for 14 union groups in 1945. The unions were registered under the Trade Union Ordinance of 1941. In 1954, the union proposed that the local unions be amalgamated along industrial groupings to make the union strong. The proposal was approved in 1955. The union had 24 member unions in 1958 and was regulated by the Industrial Relations Act 56. The first elections of the GTUC was held in 1966 after Kwame Nkrumah, the first president of Ghana was overthrown. The election was conducted to replace the union leaders who were under detention under the National Liberation Council. In 1971, the GTUC was dissolved as the sole trades union congress after parliament, led by the Busia government, passed Act 383. The Act was repealed by the I.K. Acheampong government in the same year. The union's executives were replaced in a "coup d'etat" in 1983 by an Interim Management Committee at the instance of the Association of Local Unions (ALU) of the Greater Accra Region. The union in 1984 held it national congress to restore it existence and restored its constitutionality.

== Membership ==
The membership of the organization is made up of all workers' group. A local union is formed by any five members at a work place. Various local groups which share common objectives form a national group - a local group. The local union upon formally registering with the TUC is admitted as a member of the group.

== Functions ==
The union's functions include:

- protecting the collective bargaining rights of member unions under it
- advocacy and policy intervention concerning labour market and national issues that concerns its members.

== Affiliates ==
In 2007, the member strength of the union was about 350,000 members, which had grown to 479,270 by 2018. As of that date, the following unions were affiliated:

Union	Abbreviation	Founded	Membership (1985)	Membership (2018)
Cocoa Research Workers' Union	CRWU		N/A	1,000
Communications Workers' Union	CWU	1958	7,000	2,881
Construction and Building Materials Workers' Union	CBMWU	1954	39,553	10,000
Federation of Universities Senior Staff Association of Ghana	FUSSAG	1972		2,262
General Agricultural Workers' Union	GAWU	1959	100,000	50,000
General Construction, Manufacturing and Quarries Workers' Union	GCMQWU		N/A	5,167
General Transport, Petroleum and Chemical Workers' Union	GTPCWU	1967	29,185	7,500
Ghana Mine Workers' Union	GMWU	1944	27,018	20,000
Ghana Private Road Transport Union	GPRTU	1967	56,138	120,000
Health Services Workers' Union	HSWU	1965	30,000	28,811
Local Government Workers' Union	LGWU	1956	35,000	10,000
Maritime and Dockworkers' Union	MDU	1956	31,085	10,000
National Union of Seamen, Ports and Allied Workers	NUSPAW	1940	5,011	1,500
Public Services Workers' Union	PSWU	1959	63,000	24,000
Public Utility Workers' Union	PUWU	1967	20,000	10,288
Railway Enginemen's Union	REU	1951	898	300
Railway Workers' Union	RWU	1926	8,955	1,342
Teachers' and Educational Workers' Union	TEWU	1962	40,000	60,000
Timber and Woodworkers' Union	TWU	1952	18,000	8,400
Union of Industry, Commerce and Finance	UNICOF	2003	N/A	12,000
Union of Informal Workers Associations	UNIWA	2013	N/A	87,000

=== Former affiliates ===
Union	Abbreviation	Left	Reason not affiliated	Membership (1958)
Accra Municipal Workers' Union				2,800
Agriculture Department Employees' Union		1959	Merged into GAWU	5,958
Airways Workers' Union				98
Amalgamated Civil Engineering and Woodworkers' Union	ACEWU			
Bank of British West Africa Employees' Union				850
Barclays' Bank Staff Union				121
Cape Coast Municipal Workers' Union				198
Cocoa Purchasing Company Employees' Union				476
Compagnie Français de l'Afrique Occidentale Employees' Union				1,500
Commercial and Allied Workers' Union		1960	Merged into ICU	3,000
Cooks' and Stewards' Union of Western Province		1956	Merged into MDU	N/A
Co-operative Movement Union				600
Eastern Province Cooks' and Stewards' Union		1956	Merged into MDU	N/A
Elder Dempster Lines Dockworkers' Union		1956	Merged into MDU	N/A
Elder Dempster Lines Workers' Union		1956	Merged into MDU	N/A
G. B. Ollivant Employees' Union				800
General Engineering Construction Employees' Union			Merged into ACEWU	N/A
Ghana Broadcasting Employees' Union		1959	Merged into PSWU	507
Ghana Cocoa Marketing Board Employees' Union				30
Ghana Government Electrical Workers' Union				997
Ghana Government Transport Employees' Union				840
Ghana Housing Employees' Union		1956	Merged into CBMWU	184
Ghana Maritime Workers' Union		1956	Merged into MDU	N/A
Ghana Masons' Union		1956	Merged into CBMWU	46
Ghana Meteorological Employees' Staff Union		1959	Merged into PSWU	200
Ghana Military Civil Employees' Union				200
Ghana Motor Drivers' Union		1967	Merged into GPRTU	6,236
Ghana Post Office African Employees' Union		1958	Merged into CWU	550
Ghana Societe Commerciale Oriental Afrique Employees' Union				900
Ghana Taxi Drivers' Union				200
Ghana Union of Teachers	GUT	1962	Dissolved	2,349
Ghana Water Works African Employees' Union				508
Gold Coast National Union of Teachers	NUT	1956	Merged into GUT	N/A
Gold Coast Teachers' Union	GCTU	1956	Merged into GUT	N/A
Health and General Hospital Workers' Union	HGHWU	1964	Merged into HSWU	N/A
ICT and General Services Workers Employees' Union				N/A
Industrial and Commercial Workers' Union	ICU	2003	Disaffiliated	N/A
Industrial Development Corporation Employees' Union			Merged into ACEWU	N/A
Kumasi Municipal Workers' Union				2,453
National Seamen and Dock Workers' Union		1956	Merged into MDU	N/A
National Union of Domestic, Restaurant, Bar and Hotel Workers				1,105
National Union of Ghana Oil Workers				800
Postal Engineering Workers' Union		1958	Merged into CWU	1,592
Post and Telegraph Aeradio Employees' Union				100
Public Works Department Employees' Union				18,568
Sekondi Takoradi Municipal Workers' Union				600
Survey Department Employees' Union				296
Taylor Woodrow African Employees' Union			Merged into ACEWU	N/A
Teamsters' and Private Transport Workers' Union		1962		N/A
Transport and Telecommunications Workers' Union				N/A
Union of Catering Trades				N/A
Union of Teachers and Educational Institution Workers	UTEIW	1962	Dissolved	N/A
University College of Ghana Employees' Union				500
West African Cocoa Research Institute Workers' Union		1959	Merged into GAWU	567
West African Graphic Employees' Union				300

== International affiliations ==
The federation affiliated to the International Confederation of Free Trade Unions (ICFTU) in the early 1950s, and in 1957, it hosted the founding conference of the ICFTU African Regional Organisation. The country's membership of the Non-Aligned Movement, and the ICFTU's opposition to the TUC spending money on a new Trades Hall building, led the TUC to resign from the ICFTU in 1959. It retained informal links with some ICFTU affiliates, and rejoined the ICFTU in 1966. Today it is affiliated with International Trade Union Confederation, the successor of ICFTU.

The GTUC is affiliated with various international trade union organizations, including the Organisation of Trade Unions of West Africa (OTUWA).

== Leadership ==
=== Secretaries-General ===
1945: Manfred Gaisie
1947: Anthony Woode
1950: Charles Techie-Menson
1952: A. Allotey Moffatt
1953: E. C. Turkson-Ocran
1954: John Kofi Barku Tettegah
1959: Joe-Fio N. Meyer
1960: John Kofi Barku Tettegah
1962: Sylvanus D. Magnus-George (acting)
1964: Kwaw Ampah
1966: Benjamin Bentum
1972: Alhaji Issifu
1982: J. R. Baiden
1982: Interim committee
1983: Augustus Yankey
1993: Christian Appiah-Agyei
2000: Kwasi Adu-Amankwah
2008: Kofi Asamoah
2016: Anthony Yaw Baah

=== Chairs ===
1945: Charles Techie-Menson
1948: J. C. Vandyck
1950: J. N. Sam
1952: Larbi Odam
1953: F. E. Techie-Menson
1956: Joe-Fio N. Meyer
1958: D. K. Foevie
1964: Benjamin Bentum
1966:
E. O. Amoah
1983: E. K. Aboagye
1988: Dennis Vormawor
1992: Alex K. Bonney
2012: Georgina Opoku Amankwah
2016: Richard Kwasi Yeboah
2021: Alex Nyarko-Opoku
